= 260s =

Decade

The 260s decade ran from January 1, 260, to December 31, 269.

== Events ==
=== 260 ===
==== By place ====
====== Roman Empire ======
- Battle of Edessa: With a large army, said to number 70,000 men, Valerian attempts to drive the Persians back from Edessa. The Roman army is surrounded and most of its troops are killed or captured. Valerian is taken prisoner for the remainder of his life.
- King Shapur I captures Valerian.
- King Shapur I sends Valerian to Bishapur and uses the captured Roman army for engineering plans. They construct the Band-e Kaisar ("Bridge of Valerian").
- Gallienus becomes the sole emperor of Rome; during his reign the Pannonian governor Ingenuus revolts on the Danube.
- Gallienus evacuates the fortifications (limes) in the Agri Decumates (Germania Superior), covering the Black Forest area in the face of invading Alamanni.
- Gallienus establishes himself at Mediolanum (modern Milan); he reorganizes the army, supported by elite cavalry, and dispatches troops to the Rhine frontier.
- Postumus, Roman usurper, forms the Gallic Empire and protects the Rhine against an invasion of Germanic tribes.
- Saloninus, son of Gallienus, is proclaimed Augustus by his troops. Postumus besieges Cologne, where Silvanus is praetorian prefect and Roman ruler of Gaul.
- Postumus executes Saloninus and his adviser Silvanus after breaching the walls of Cologne. He is recognized as emperor and establishes his capital at Trier.
- Postumus wins over all the Roman provinces west of the Alps, including Gaul, Britain and Hispania.
- The Roman fort of Wiesbaden (Germany) is captured by the Alamanni.
- The Franks take control over the Scheldt estuary (approximate date).

====== Persia ======
- Persian king Shapur I destroys Caesarea Mazaca in Asia Minor.

====== China ======
- Emperor Cao Mao of Former Wei state attempts to lead a coup against the powerful regent Sima Zhao, but he himself is killed before it comes to a confrontation.
- June 2 – Cao Mao is killed in a coup d'état against Sima Zhao. The 14-year-old Cao Huan becomes ruler of Former Wei, but the Sima clan controls the state.

==== By topic ====
====== Art and Science ======
- Earliest known date of chess (approximate date).

====== Religion ======
- Pope Dionysius convenes a synod at Rome to demand an explanation from bishop Dionysius of Alexandria, who has been charged with separating the members of the Trinity as three distinct deities.
- Paul of Samosata becomes Patriarch of Antioch.

=== 261 ===
==== By place ====
====== Roman Empire ======
- Emperor Gallienus crushes the Alemanni at Milan (approximate date).
- Gallienus repeals the edict of 258, which led to the persecution of the Christians.
- Gallienus usurpers: The rebellion of Macrianus Major, Macrianus Minor, and Quietus against Gallienus comes to an end. They march from Asia to Europe but they are defeated in Thrace by Gallienus' general Aureolus, and both Macrianus Major and Macrianus Minor are killed. Quietus flees to Emesa, where he is killed by Odaenathus of Palmyra.
- Roman–Persian Wars: Balista, Roman usurper, collects ships from Cilician ports and defeats a Persian raiding force near Pompeiopolis.

====== Asia ======
- Michu of Silla ascends to the Korean throne of Silla, becoming the first ruler of the Long Kim line.

=== 262 ===
==== By place ====
====== Roman Empire ======
- The Goths invade Asia Minor and destroy the Temple of Artemis in Ephesus.
- An earthquake strikes Ephesus and Pergamon and another strikes Cyrene.
- The Heruls accompany the Goths, ravaging the coasts of the Black Sea and the Aegean.

=== 263 ===
==== By place ====
====== Roman Empire ======
- King Odenathus of Palmyra declares himself ruler of the area west of the River Euphrates and is declared Dux Orientalis by the Roman emperor Gallienus.

====== Asia ======
- Conquest of Shu by Wei: The Chinese state of Cao Wei conquers Shu Han, one of its two rival states.
- Sima Zhao, regent of the Cao Wei state, receives and accepts the nine bestowments, state chancellorship, and the title Duke of Jin from Cao Huan.

==== By topic ====
====== Art and Science ======
- Chinese mathematician Liu Hui writes a commentary on The Nine Chapters on the Mathematical Art, describing what will later be called Gaussian elimination, computing pi, etc.

=== 264 ===
==== By place ====
====== Asia ======
- March 1–3 – Zhong Hui's Rebellion in China is quelled.
- Sima Zhao, regent of the Chinese state of Cao Wei, styles himself the "King of Jin", the penultimate step before usurpation.
- Sun Hao succeeds Sun Xiu as emperor of the Chinese state of Eastern Wu.

=== 265 ===
==== By place ====
====== Roman Empire ======
- Emperor Gallienus tries twice to crush the usurper Postumus, but on the first occasion Aureolus, commander of the elite cavalry, carelessly lets him escape. The second time, Gallienus sustains an arrow wound and has to break off his siege of a Gallic town where Postumus has holed up. He makes no other serious attempt to overcome his rival, instead devoting his attention to the political and military problems in the Danube and eastern parts of the Roman Empire.
- Postumus makes no move to march on Rome and claim his territory south of Gaul.
- Gallienus gives the order to fortify Milan and Verona.
- Gallienus repels the invasion of the Goths in the Balkans.
- A general of Gallienus' army, Victorinus, defects to Postumus.

====== China ======
- Sima Zhao, who had been the regent and de facto primary authority of the state of Cao Wei for little over 10 years by this point, passes away, leaving his authority to his eldest son, Sima Yan, who will go on to disestablish the state of Cao Wei in February 266, founding the Jin dynasty.

=== 266 ===
==== By place ====
====== Roman Empire ======
- King Odaenathus of Palmyra invades Persia to conquer the capital, Ctesiphon, and twice comes as far as the walls of the Persian capital, but fails to take it. After his victories in the East, he pronounces himself with the title "king of kings".
- A powerful tropical volcanic eruption around this year brings a below-average flood of the Nile next year.

====== Ireland ======
- The rule of High King Cormac mac Airt ends (approximate date).

====== Asia ======
- February 4 – Sima Yan, regent of the Chinese state of Cao Wei, forces the last Cao Wei emperor Cao Huan to abdicate in his favour. The Cao Wei state's existence comes to an end. Sima Yan establishes the Jin Dynasty, and becomes its first emperor on 8 February, and is historically known as "Wu of Jin". He establishes his capital at Luoyang, and gives his male relatives independent military commands throughout his empire.

=== 267 ===
==== By place ====
====== Roman Empire ======
- First Gothic invasion: The Goths, originally from Scandinavia, with the Sarmatians (from modern Iran), invade the Balkans and Greece. They ravage Moesia and Thrace.
- The Heruli invade the Black Sea coast; they unsuccessfully attack Byzantium and Cyzicus. The Roman fleet defeats the Herulian fleet (500 ships) but allows them to escape into the Aegean Sea, where they raid the islands of Lemnos and Skyros.
- The Goths sack several cities of southern Greece including Athens, Corinth, Argos and Sparta. After the Sack of Athens, an Athenian militia force (2,000 men), under the historian Dexippus, pushes the invaders to the north where they are intercepted by the Roman army under emperor Gallienus. He wins an important victory near the Nestos River, on the boundary between Macedonia and Thrace.
- Aureolus, charged with defending Italy, defeats Victorinus (co-emperor of Gaul), is proclaimed emperor by his troops, and begins his march on Rome.

====== Near East ======
- King Septimius Odaenathus of Palmyra makes plans for a campaign in Cappadocia against the Goths. He is assassinated, along with his eldest son, most probably by his nephew due to a previous altercation between him and Odaenathus. His wife Zenobia succeeds him, and rules Vaballathus (the Palmyrene Empire) with her young son.

=== 268 ===
==== By place ====
====== Roman Empire ======
- September – Battle of Naissus: Emperor Gallienus, aided by Aurelian, defeats a Gothic coalition (50,000 warriors) near Naissus (Niš, modern Serbia).
- Gallienus is killed by his senior officers at Mediolanum (Milan) while besieging his rival Aureolus. Aureolus is murdered in turn by the Praetorian guard.
- Marcus Aurelius Claudius, who may have murdered Gallienus, becomes the new emperor of Rome and will reign as Claudius II.
- Claudius II asks the Senate to spare the lives of Gallienus's family and political supporters. Emperor Gallienus is deified and buried in a family tomb on the Appian Way.
- The Alamanni invade Italy north of the Po River.
- The Visigoths first appear as distinct people.
- November – Battle of Lake Benacus: A Roman army (35,000 men) under emperor Claudius II defeats the Germanic tribes of the Alamanni along the banks of Lake Garda.

====== Europe ======
- Victorinus is declared emperor of the Gallic Empire by the legions at Augusta Treverorum (Trier), following the murders of his predecessors. He is recognized by the provinces of Gaul and Britain, but Hispania might have reunited with the Roman Empire.

==== By Topic ====
====== Religion ======
- December 26 – Pope Dionysius dies in Rome after a 9-year reign and is succeeded by Felix I.

=== 269 ===
==== By place ====
====== Roman Empire ======
- Second Gothic invasion: The Goths and other German tribes attack Bosphorean towns on the coast of the Black Sea. Some 2,000 ships and 320,000 men from the Danube enter Roman territory. Emperor Claudius II defeats the invaders and receives the title Gothicus for his triumph. Many of the prisoners will serve in the Roman legions and settle in vacant lands in the Danubian provinces.
- Claudius II travels to Sirmium and prepares a war against the Vandals, who raid Pannonia.
- The Heruli capture Athens and raid the Aegean Islands as far as Crete and Rhodes.
- Marcus Cassianius Latinius Postumus is killed by his own troops, after not allowing them to sack the city of Mogontiacum.

====== Near East ======
- Queen Zenobia conquers Syria, Palestine, Lebanon, parts of Mesopotamia and Anatolia and Egypt, giving her control of Rome's grain supply. The library at Alexandria is partly burned during a raid by Zabdas, general of Zenobia.

==== By topic ====
====== Religion ======
- January 5 – Pope Felix I succeeds Dionysius as the 26th pope of Rome.
- Paul of Samosata is deposed as Patriarch of Antioch (though he is not removed until 272).

== Births ==
260

- Eusebius of Caesarea, Greek bishop and historian (approximate date)

261

- Lu Ji (or Shiheng), Chinese general and politician (d. 303)

265

- Eusebius of Caesarea, Greek historian (approximate date)

266

- Galeria Valeria, Roman empress and wife of Galerius (d. 315)
- Wang Dun (or Chuzhong), Chinese general and warlord (d. 324)
- Zu Ti (or Shizhi), Chinese general and adviser (d. 321)

267

- Pei Wei (or Yimin), Chinese philosopher and politician (d. 300)

269

- Chi Jian (or Daohui), Chinese general (d. 339)
- Murong Hui, Chinese general and politician (d. 333)

== Deaths ==
260

- June 2 – Cao Mao, Chinese emperor of the Cao Wei state (b. 241)
- July 2 – Cao Jie, Chinese empress of the Han Dynasty (b. 197)
- Chen Tai (or Xuanbo), Chinese general and politician
- Regalianus (or Regalian), Roman general and usurper
- Saloninus, Roman emperor and son of Gallienus (b.242)
- Shapur Meshanshah, Sasanian prince and governor
- Sun Liang, Chinese emperor of the Eastern Wu state (b. 243)
- Valerianus I, Roman consul and emperor (approximate date)
- Wang Guan (or Weitai), Chinese official and politician
- Wang Jing (or Yanwei), Chinese official and politician

261

- June 9 – Wang Ji (or Boyu), Chinese general (b. 190)
- Lucius Mussius Aemilianus, Roman usurper
- Macrianus Major, Roman general and usurper
- Macrianus Minor, Roman consul and usurper
- Quietus, Roman consul and usurper
- Valens Thessalonicus, Roman usurper
- Yang Xi (or Wenran), Chinese politician

262

- Ji Kang (or Shuye), Chinese Daoist philosopher and poet (b. 223)
- Marinus of Caesarea, Roman soldier and Christian martyr
- Valerian, Roman consul and emperor (approximate date)

263

- Gao Rou (or Wenhui), Chinese politician (b. 174)
- Lady Li (or Lishi), Chinese noblewoman
- Liu Chen, Chinese prince of the Shu Han state
- Ruan Ji, Chinese poet and musician (b. 210)
- Zhuge Zhan, Chinese general and politician (b. 227)

264

- Zhong Hui, Chinese philosopher
- March 3
  - Jiang Wei (or Boyue), Chinese general and regent (b. 202)
  - Zhang Yi (or Bogong), Chinese general and politician
- September 3 – Sun Xiu (Jing of Wu), Chinese emperor (b. 235)
- Deng Ai (or Shizai), Chinese general and politician (b. 197)
- Guo (or Mingyuan), Chinese empress of the Cao Wei state
- Liao Hua (or Yuanjian), Chinese general and politician
- Liu Xuan, Chinese prince of the Shu Han state (b. 224)
- Puyang Xing (or Ziyuan), Chinese official and chancellor
- Zong Yu (or Deyan), Chinese general and politician

Valerian (emperor) (b.199) 265

- Dionysius the Great, patriarch of Alexandria
- September 6 – Sima Zhao, Chinese general and politician (b. 211)
- Ma Jun, Chinese engineer and inventor of the south-pointing chariot
- Zhu (or Jing), Chinese empress of the Eastern Wu state

266

- Wang Chen (or Chudao), Chinese general and politician
- Wang Fan, Chinese astronomer and mathematician (b. 228)

267

- Septimius Herodianus, co-king of Palmyra (assassinated)
- Septimius Odaenathus, king of Palmyra (assassinated)

268

- December 26 – Dionysius, bishop of Rome
- Aureolus, Roman usurper
- Gallienus, Roman emperor (b. 218)
- Laelianus, Roman usurper
- Marcus Aurelius Marius, Roman emperor (Gaul)
- Postumus, Roman emperor of the Gallic Empire

269

- Jingū, Japanese empress and regent (b. 169)
- Justin the Confessor, Christian priest and martyr
- Liu Yin (or Xiuran), Chinese general and administrator
- Lu Kai (or Jingfeng), Chinese general and politician (b. 198)
- Marcus Aurelius Marius, Gallic general and emperor
- Marcus Cassianius Latinius Postumus, Gallic emperor
- Ulpius Cornelius Laelianus, Gallic emperor and usurper
- Wang Xiang (or Xiuzheng), Chinese politician (b. 185)
- Xin Xianying, Chinese noblewoman and advisor (b. 191)
