= 261 =

261 in various calendars
- Gregorian calendar: 261; CCLXI
- Ab urbe condita: 1014
- Assyrian calendar: 5011
- Balinese saka calendar: 182–183
- Bengali calendar: −333 – −332
- Berber calendar: 1211
- Buddhist calendar: 805
- Burmese calendar: −377
- Byzantine calendar: 5769–5770
- Chinese calendar: 庚辰年 (Metal Dragon); 2958 or 2751 — to — 辛巳年 (Metal Snake); 2959 or 2752
- Coptic calendar: −23 – −22
- Discordian calendar: 1427
- Ethiopian calendar: 253–254
- Hebrew calendar: 4021–4022
- Hindu calendars
- Vikram Samvat: 317–318
- Shaka Samvat: 182–183
- Kali Yuga: 3361–3362
- Holocene calendar: 10261
- Iranian calendar: 361 BP – 360 BP
- Islamic calendar: 372 BH – 371 BH
- Javanese calendar: 140–141
- Julian calendar: 261; CCLXI
- Korean calendar: 2594
- Minguo calendar: 1651 before ROC 民前1651年
- Nanakshahi calendar: −1207
- Seleucid era: 572/573 AG
- Thai solar calendar: 803–804
- Tibetan calendar: ལྕགས་ཕོ་འབྲུག་ལོ་ (male Iron-Dragon); 387 or 6 or −766 — to — ལྕགས་མོ་སྦྲུལ་ལོ་ (female Iron-Snake); 388 or 7 or −765

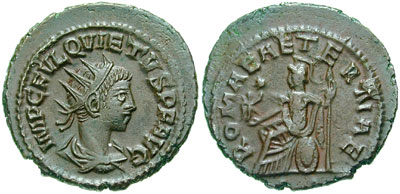
Quietus (r. 260–261)

Year 261 (CCLXI) was a common year starting on Tuesday of the Julian calendar. At the time, it was known as the Year of the Consulship of Gallienus and Taurus (or, less frequently, year 1014 Ab urbe condita). The denomination 261 for this year has been used since the early medieval period, when the Anno Domini calendar era became the prevalent method in Europe for naming years.

== Events ==
=== By place ===
==== Roman Empire ====
- Emperor Gallienus crushes the Alemanni at Milan (approximate date).
- Gallienus repeals the edict of 258, which led to the persecution of the Christians.
- Gallienus usurpers: The rebellion of Macrianus Major, Macrianus Minor, and Quietus against Gallienus comes to an end. They march from Asia to Europe but they are defeated in Thrace by Gallienus' general Aureolus, and both Macrianus Major and Macrianus Minor are killed. Quietus flees to Emesa, where he is killed by Odaenathus of Palmyra.
- Roman–Persian Wars: Balista, Roman usurper, collects ships from Cilician ports and defeats a Persian raiding force near Pompeiopolis.

==== Asia ====
- Michu of Silla ascends to the Korean throne of Silla, becoming the first ruler of the Long Kim line.

== Births ==
- Lu Ji (or Shiheng), Chinese general and politician (d. 303)

== Deaths ==
- June 9 – Wang Ji (or Boyu), Chinese general (b. 190)
- Lucius Mussius Aemilianus, Roman usurper
- Macrianus Major, Roman general and usurper
- Macrianus Minor, Roman consul and usurper
- Quietus, Roman consul and usurper
- Valens Thessalonicus, Roman usurper
- Yang Xi (or Wenran), Chinese politician
