= Valens Thessalonicus =

3rd-century Roman imperial usurper

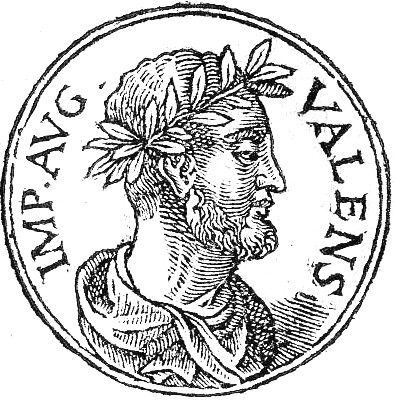
- Imaginary portrait from Promptuarii Iconum Insigniorum (1553)
- Born: 3rd century
- Died: 261
- Other name: Valens cognomento Thessalonicus
- Occupations: Roman governor and usurper
- Known for: Revolt against Emperor Gallienus

Valens Thessalonicus was a Roman usurper active in Achaea during the reign of Emperor Gallienus in the mid-3rd century. He was proclaimed emperor by his troops in 261 CE during the period of political and military turmoil known as the Crisis of the Third Century. Valens's brief revolt occurred while Gallienus faced a series of simultaneous uprisings across the empire following the capture of his father, Emperor Valerian, by the Persian king Shapur I.

Almost all information about Valens comes from later literary sources, which provide fragmentary and uncertain accounts. He appears to have served as governor of Achaea and was targeted by forces loyal to the eastern usurper Macrianus Major, who sought to secure his line of advance westward. When the general Piso was sent to eliminate him, Valens's own troops turned on Piso and killed him. Shortly afterward, Valens himself was murdered by his soldiers for reasons unknown. His brief reign illustrates the instability of imperial power during the 260s, when numerous commanders were elevated by their troops and swiftly overthrown.

== Sources and historiography ==
Valens Thessalonicus is a shadowy figure known mainly through late sources. The Historia Augusta offers the only narrative account, though it is widely regarded by historians as unreliable for this period. Additional fragments appear in Zonaras' Epitome Historiarum and in modern reconstructions such as Christian Körner's study of usurpers under Gallienus on De Imperatoribus Romanis. Valens is mentioned by name only in the Historia Augusta, listed among the so-called Thirty Tyrants as "Valens surnamed Thessalonicus" (Valentis cognomento Thessalonici).

According to Victor Duruy, a Valens "who later briefly became emperor" appears to have lifted the 254 Gothic siege of Thessalonica, as suggested by Ammianus Marcellinus, in whose account he bears the surname "Thessalonicus".

== Background ==
In the early third century, Rome's eastern frontier came under renewed pressure with the rise of the Sasanian Empire. Founded by Ardashir I after the collapse of the Parthian Arsacid dynasty, the Sasanians re-established a powerful Persian state centred in Mesopotamia and Iran. Ardashir's campaigns against Roman strongholds between 237 and 240 were continued by his son, Persian king Shapur I, whose victories soon brought the two empires into open conflict.

In 260 CE Shapur defeated and captured Emperor Valerian at Edessa in Roman Mesopotamia. Valerian's son, Gallienus, who had ruled jointly with him, suddenly found himself sole ruler of a fractured empire. With Gallienus forced to defend the western provinces against Germanic incursions, imperial control in the East collapsed. The loss of Valerian created a political vacuum across the frontier provinces, where armies and governors were left to face invasions and internal unrest on their own. This turmoil facilitated the emergence of military strongmen who sought to preserve order amid the empire's crisis.

The Roman Empire between 260 and 269 CE, showing the Gallic and Palmyrene breakaway states. Valens Thessalonicus revolted in Achaea during this period of fragmentation.

Swiss historian Jacob Burckhardt describes this period as one of "utter confusion" when authority shifted from Rome to the provincial camps of the frontier legions. Face with invasions and internal revolts, local commanders assumed imperial titles as a defensive measure rather than open rebellion.

=== Rebellions under Gallienus ===
Without Valerian in the east, the border populations and their legions felt vulnerable and elected their own emperors to guarantee they would have leaders against foreign threats. After the capture of Valerian, the legions of Pannonia threw off their allegiance to Gallienus and proclaimed Ingenuus, their military commander, emperor. After Gallienus put down this rebellion and returned to Italy to deal with the Alemannic invasion, another Roman general in Pannonia, Regalianus, would attempt to take the throne.

Meanwhile, in Syria, Macrianus Major, one of Valerian's officers in charge of the treasury took advantage of the situation, gained the support of a key military commander, Balista, and claimed the throne for his two sons, Macrianus Minor and Quietus. In 261, after securing control of Egypt, Syria and Asia Minor, Macrianus Major and his son Macrianus Minor decided that they would travel west to Italy to confront and overthrow Gallienus. In their path to Italy, however, were the governors of the various Roman provinces with their military forces. One such governor remaining loyal to Emperor Gallienus was Valens Thessalonicus of the province of Achaea.

== Valens's revolt ==
To remove Valens as an obstacle, Macrianus Major and his son sent Piso to Achaea with orders to kill him. Piso, described in the Historia Augusta as a descendant of the gens Calpurnia and known for his strict virtues, proclaimed himself emperor in Thessaly under the name "Thessalicus," probably a confused echo of Valens's name. His rebellion was quickly ended when Valens's soldiers caught and executed him.

During this same period, Valens was proclaimed emperor by his own troops, perhaps as a defensive measure against the eastern rebels or as a spontaneous act by his army. Soon afterward, those same soldiers turned on him and killed him. The motives for his assassination remain uncertain, Körner notes that mutinies and reversals of allegiance were frequent among provincial armies during Gallienus's reign.

== Aftermath ==
The elimination of Valens and Piso cleared the route for Macrianus Major and Macrianus Minor to advance westward. Their campaign ended in Thrace later in 261, when they were defeated by Aureolus, Gallienus's master of cavalry. According to Zonaras, the Macriani were encircled and surrendered; both were slain after requesting death rather than capture. Quietus, who remained in the East, was soon besieged and killed at Emesa by Odaenathus of Palmyra, a loyal client king of Rome.

== Legacy ==
Valens was later included among the so-called Thirty Tyrants of the Historia Augusta, a group of short-lived imperial claimants said to have arisen under Gallienus. Modern historians, like John Bray, interpret the "Thirty Tyrants" as a rhetorical construct rather than a literal list, reflecting the instability of the mid-third-century empire.
