= Macrianus =

Macrianus is a Roman personal name. People with this name include:

- Macrianus Major, Roman usurper
- Macrianus Minor, son of Macrianus Major
- Macrianus, 4th century CE Alamannic king
