= Lucius Petronius Taurus Volusianus =

Roman consul and praetorian prefect (died c.286)

Vir Consularis Ordinarius Lucius Petronius Taurus Volusianus
- Born: Etruria (?)
- Died: 268 AD (?); Rome?
- Cause of death: Murdered (?)
- Citizenship: Roman
- Occupations: Soldier and Imperial functionary
- Employer: Emperor Gallienus
- Title: Prefect of Vigiles, 259 (?), Praetorian Prefect, 260-6 (?), Consul Ordinarius (with Gallienus), 261, Praefectus Urbi, 267-8
- Predecessor: (As Praefectus Urbi) Aspasius Paternus
- Successor: (As Praefectus Urbi) Flavius Antiochianus
- Children: Lucius Publius Petronius Volusianus (?)

Lucius Petronius Taurus Volusianus (died c.268 AD) was a Roman citizen, apparently of equestrian origins, whose career in the Imperial Service in the mid-Third Century AD carried him from a relatively modest station in life to the highest public offices and senatorial status in a very few years. He may have secured his first appointments before the Licinian Dynasty – (Valerian and his son Gallienus) – acceded to the Empire in 253 AD, but it was in the course of their reign that his upward progress achieved an almost unprecedented momentum and the second factor seems to have been a consequence of the first. The nature of his relationship to the Licinii is uncertain, but it seems likely that a common origin in the Etruscan region of central Italy at least predisposed Gallienus in his favour and he seems to have been that emperor's most trusted servant and adviser during the period of his sole reign - 260(?)-268 AD.

== Contemporary sources ==
Almost all that is known of Volusianus is derived from an epigraphic inscription dedicated to him by the Town Council of the municipium of Arretium (Arezzo, Italy) of which he was a patronus. However, as a Consul and Praefectus Urbi he also appears in the Fasti Romani, i.e., the record of Roman office-holders.

== Origins ==
Volusianus was the son of a Roman citizen also with the praenomen 'Lucius' of the Petronii clan. His Roman voting Tribe was the Sabatinae. Sabatina was a district in Etruria; thus it is likely that the family was of Etruscan origin. Volusianus's patronage of Arezzo in later life does not necessarily mean that he was born there, (Note: The birthplace most confidently asserted is Volaterranus (Volterra, Tuscany).) but it does indicate some strong regional connection. (Note: For Volusianus's Etruscan origins also see)

It is possible that, as an Etruscan of equestrian rank - see below - Volusianus had social connections with powerful senatorial families of Etruscan provenance, two of which achieved Imperial status in the mid-third century AD. This would go some way to explain the extraordinary momentum of his career from the early 250s AD onward. The Treboniani (the family of the Emperor Trebonianus Gallus) and the Licinii (the family of the Emperors Valerian and Gallienus) have both been suggested in this connection. It seems agreed that a connection between these families and the Petronii Volusiani based on a common regional origin is not impossible, but that a blood-relationship is unlikely.

According to the Arretium Inscription, when Volusianus's career began he was already of equestrian rank, but it is not known if he was born into that level of society or achieved it as a result of his career. He probably became a senator in 261 - see below.

== Career ==
The Arretium Inscription lists Volusianus's appointments in reverse chronological order according to the usual Roman practice. In chronological order they are:

1. LAVRENS LAVINAS – This signifies the holding of a minor priesthood. The holders had to be of equestrian status. This indicates that he had the property qualifications required for equestrian status, but was not yet admitted to the Ordo Equester - see Roman equestrian order for a fuller explanation of this distinction;
2. EX V DECVRIIS – Signifies membership on one of the panels of five judges of equestrian status available to decide issues of fact;
3. EQVO PVBLICO – Indicates that he had taken part in the annual parade of the equestrians in Rome and was, therefore, an accredited member of the Ordo and was eligible for official appointments reserved for members of the order;
4. CENTVRIO DEPVTATVS – One of the commanders of the troops detached from the provincial armies for special service about the Emperor. These were formed into a unit known as the Peregrini. When the Emperors were in Rome the Peregrini were quartered at the Castra Peregrina on the Caelian Hill. The centurio deputatus postings ranked high in the centurionate and were highly political and had the rank of primi ordines, the most senior legionary centurions. It seems surprising, therefore, that Volusianus should have been given this job as his first recorded military appointment. It was possible for equestrians to be directly commissioned into the legionary centurionate if an opening could be found in one of the provincial garrisons. However, in the case of the Peregrini a prior posting as a legionary centurion in the provinces was usually a sine qua non. Bray suggests, tentatively, that Volusianus might have had an unrecorded posting as a legionary centurion before he went to the Castra Peregrina, a proposition also mooted by Pflaum This hypothesis could explain the apparent anomaly, but neither authority seems particularly attached to it;
5. PRIMVS PILVS LEGIONIS XXX VLPIAE – Senior ranking centurion of this legion which was normally stationed at Castra Vetera (modern Xanten) in the province of Germania Inferior. Bray suggests that it was during this posting that Volusianus came to the attention of Gallienus when he campaigned against the Franci in Germania Inferior in the early years of his reign;
6. PRAEPOSITVS EQVITVM SINGVLIARORVM AVGG NN - Commander of a troop of the Emperor's mounted bodyguard - i.e., the 'Imperial Horse Guard'. The Equites Singulares usually provided close-protection for the Emperor, but, detachments could be sent away on special missions. Pflaum suggests that this was a reference to such an occasion, although nothing is known of the circumstances. (By the mid-third century the term praepositus indicated a commander appointed for a specific mission or campaign, but was not a substantive rank.). The formulation Augg NN (i.e., Augustorum Nostrorum– 'of Our August Lords') indicates that there were two Emperors when Volusianus held this office. It is generally assumed that the Emperors concerned were Valerian and Gallienus; In other words, this posting occurred at some stage in the period 253-60 AD.
7. LEGIONIS X ET XIII GEMINAE PROVINCIAE PANNONIAE ITIM (most likely a misspelling of item) LEGIONIS DACIAE – Indicates that Volusianus was associated with a detached force. The PLRE suggests he was the praepositus. The detachment included units from Legio X Gemina which is assumed to have had its main base at Vindobona in Pannonia Superior (modern Vienna, Austria) at this time and Legio XIII Gemina. The latter legion was thought to have been based at Apulum in the province of Dacia (modern Alba Julia in Romania), but this item in the inscription suggests that it may also have had detachments serving in Pannonia. (This could explain the formulation provinciae Panonniae ('of the province of Pannonia') as intended to distinguish these elements from the main body of the legion (in Dacia). The detachments legionis Daciae (i.e., 'of the Dacian legion') might refer to additional detachments of Legio V Macedonica, which, like XIII Gemina, is known to have served in Dacia. The use of such ad hoc formations composed of elements of more than one legion and detached from their parent-bodies became increasingly necessary in the troubled middle years of the third century AD; (Note: The enforced transformation of the tactical disposition of the Roman forces in the Balkans in the mid-Third Century AD has been much discussed in scholarly circles in recent years. See, inter alia, Potter (2004).)
8. TRIBVNVS COHORTIS III VIGILUM; XI VRBANAE; III PRAETORIAE – Indicates Volusianus was, successively, a cohort commander in the Vigiles (Roman Watch) (255?), the Cohortes Urbanae (256?), and the Praetorian Guard (257?). The Roman Watch units rarely and the Urban Cohorts never on record served outside Rome and, in the absence of evidence to the contrary, it may be presumed that it was in Rome that Volusianus served these appointments. However, Praetorian Cohorts usually followed the Emperor wherever he was. In the middle to late 250s AD they were, presumably divided between the co-Augusti Valerian and Gallienus. (Note: The Praetorian Prefect, Successianus, was among the officers captured with the Emperor Valerian by the Persians in 260 and he, presumably, had praetorians under his command.) However, this item in the record of Volusianus's cursus seems to indicate that Coh. III was with Gallienus in the West at this time;
9. TRIBVNVS COHORTIS I PRAETORIAE, PROTECTOR AVGG NN – This appointment to the tribunate (command) of the senior praetorian cohort is placed in 259(?). Again the formulation Augg NN indicates that there were two ruling Emperors, so this appointment preceded the capture of Gallienus' father, the Emperor Valerian, by the Persians. The reference indicates that Coh.I was in the west when Volusianus commanded it, but - unlike the case of Cohs. VI and VII - there is no coin-evidence to support this supposition. Protector Augg NN is the first known reference to a newly formed unit of the comitatus of Gallienus, the Protectores Augusti Nostri (i.e. 'Bodyguards of Our August Lord') which was made up of senior officers attached to the Imperial retinue. As the senior Praetorian tribunus, Volusianus would almost certainly have qualified for membership;
10. PRAEFECTVS VIGILVM PERFECTISSIMVS VIR – Volusianus is now Prefect of the Watch (probably 259 AD). Perfectissimus Vir was an honorific denoting membership of the second rank of the equestrian order. It indicates that the equestrian concerned holds a Court appointment;
11. PRAEFECTVUS PRAETORIO EMINENTISSIVS VIR – About 260(?). The Praetorian Prefect usually served ‘in the Imperial Presence’. Eminentissimus Vir (lit., 'Most Eminent Man') was an honorific signifying the highest equestrian rank reserved for the Praetorian Prefect. Given that the text records Volusianus with this title as well as Perfectissimus Vir - see above - it is curious that it never shows him as a Vir Egregius (i.e., 'Chosen Man', the honorific denoting the lowest rank of equestrians in the Imperial service);
12. VIR CONSULARIS ORDINARIUS – Volusianus was consul ordinarius with Gallienus in 261 - i.e., he was one of the two consuls appointed by the regular constitutional process (election by the Senate at the direction of the Emperor) who gave their name to the year according to the Roman practice. (Note: Consules ordinarii were often required to lay down their office well before the year was over to allow the Emperor to replace them with Consules suffecti.) By achieving this office he became a member of the highest rank of the senatorial nobility, the Viri Consulares, which made him eligible for the highest offices in the Imperial System that were reserved for senators who had held the office of consul (i.e., consulares).

== Significance of his consular appointment ==
It is generally assumed that, despite being raised to the consulate, Volusianus nevertheless continued to serve as Praetorian Prefect until his appointment as Praefectus Urbi in 267 - see below. This is possible: the office of consul was by this time largely ceremonial - though hugely prestigious (especially when held together with a reigning emperor as in Volusianus's case) - and still a prerequisite of important provincial governorships - but the workload would not have precluded him from holding other offices.

There seems no doubt that the tenure of the praetorian prefecture, the quintessential office of the Imperial autocracy, together with full membership of the Senate, was regarded as deeply transgressive of social norms as established by the constitutional settlement of Augustus by which the Emperor nominally shared his authority with the Roman Senate. During the High Empire (i.e., prior to the reign of Diocletian) the extent to which individual princes maintained the social subordination of the men they entrusted with the Equestrian Prefectures (Note: As observed earlier, the Praetorian Prefecture was the principal office of what was, in practice, the Imperial autocracy. Others included - roughly in order of importance and prestige - the prefectures of Egypt, the Vigiles, and the Roman Corn-Supply.) to the senatorial holders of the Great Magistracies inherited from the Republic and especially to the consulate, was regarded as a measure of their fidelity to the legacy of the first Emperor. (Note: Marcus Aurelius was once recorded as regretting that the fact that Pertinax had once been consul made him ineligible for such an appointment.) Volusianus was the first Praetorian prefect to hold that office in tandem with the consulate since 203 AD when C. Fulvius Plautianus had exercised it under Septimius Severus - not a happy precedent from the point of view of those who held dear the principles of the Augustan Constitutional settlement.

There is no record of Volusianus's activities as Praetorian Prefect. He is not mentioned in connection with military affairs at this time. It is possible that, despite his glittering career as a soldier, he did not prove a particularly talented general officer. (Note: Certainly, Gallienus seemed to have had greater confidence in Aureolus, his Master of the Horse, to act as his most reliable lieutenant to deal with major military emergencies - at least until Aureolus disgraced himself.) It is authoritatively suggested that, in the second half of the third century, Praetorian Prefects did exercise some sort of supremacy in military matters vice principis (i.e., 'on behalf of the emperor'). However these officers were mainly concerned with administrative and judicial matters in Italy outside Rome. On the other hand, given the poverty of the sources, too much should not be assumed from their silence.

It has been argued that Volusianus's appointment was a sign of Gallienus's mistrust of the Senate at a critical juncture in his reign. The hostility of that body was held to be evidenced by the fact that, so far as is known, Volusianus was not co-opted to any of the high priestly offices that a Consul Ordinarius usually held. This explanation of the appointment cannot be dismissed given the circumstances of the time in which it was made. With Gallienus's prestige at a low ebb and his Divine Mandate to Rule particularly questionable in the wake of the Persian captivity of his father Valerian and the related military uprisings of Postumus and the Macriani (see Macrianus Major and Macrianus Minor), he might well have considered that he needed to neutralize potential enemies in Rome. It is also possible that by raising Volusianus to the Senate while keeping him on as Praetorian prefect, Gallienus was seeking to increase his social standing and thus his ability to act as his effective viceroy in Italy outside Rome - one of the major functions of the praetorian prefecture - and to deal on equal terms with the senatorial officials who were being increasingly appointed as Correctores of the Italian regiones (in effect, making them equivalent to provincial governors of these districts) and Curatores (supervisors of the City-Councils).

However, if Gallienus's chief motive in 261 AD was, indeed, to ensure his control of the Senate in a moment of crisis by putting his trusted favorite at its head, this does not seem to have been a continuing concern. Unlike Severus in the case of Plautianus, he did not see fit to give Volusianus a second term in office. (Note: However, had he lived Gallienus might well have given Volusianus a second term as Consul after the latter had completed his tour of duty as Praefectus Urbi - see below. It seems to have been established practice dating from the time of Hadrian, at the very latest, to give a man a second term as Consul after he had served as City Prefect as a glorious culmination to a senatorial career.)

== Later life ==
In 267 Gallienus appointed Volusianus Praefectus Urbi - in effect his viceroy in the government of Rome. This was a hugely important and prestigious post in the hierarchy of the Imperial service and one still reserved for senior members of the Senate. (Note: After the reforms of Constantine the Great early in the fourth century, the Praetorian Prefect was listed first in the Imperial Service hierarchy, but by then it was an office invariably held by a man of senatorial status. In the time of Gallienus, it was still an equestrian office and, as such, in terms of prestige it is likely that its holder was outranked by the Praefectus Urbi.) Why Gallienus should have chosen to "kick Volusianus upstairs" at that particular time and replace him as Praetorian Prefect with Aurelius Heraclianus can only be conjectured. (So far as is known, Heraclianus's experience was wholly in the military field and he had no exposure to civilian administration, which constituted a major part of the remit of the Praetorian Prefecture). As with Volusianus's elevation to the consulate in 261 AD, it is suggested that his appointment as City Prefect in 267 AD is to be explained by Gallienus's mistrust of the Senate and his desire to have a trusted supporter in place to keep an eye on it. It is possible that the Emperor took the decision when he was preparing to leave Rome for the Balkans where a major barbarian incursion (viz., the Heruli invasion) threatened, so it would have been very important to insure against a possible distraction back in Rome. Whatever the merit of this suggestion, the savagery shown by the Senate against Gallienus's family and supporters (probably including Volusianus) after his murder in 268 is strongly indicative of a legacy of unresolved issues between a powerful faction of the order and the emperor that could well have built up over a number of years.

As Praefectus Urbi it is generally assumed that Volusianus remained in Rome when Gallienus went to the Balkans to deal with the barbarian incursions of 267–68. There is no record of him taking part in that campaign nor is he mentioned by any ancient source in connection with the conspiracy that led to Gallienus's assassination by his leading military officers.

== Heir ==
Volusianus may have been the father of Lucius Publius Petronius Volusianus. This man is little known, but he seems to have had a distinguished career in a wholly civilian capacity. (As a senator he would have been precluded from following his father into the army). He seems to have followed the senatorial cursus honorum, finally achieving the consulship. It is not known whether he ever governed a province.

== Death ==
As indicated above, it is normally assumed that Volusianus was, as a leading minister of Gallienus, killed in the Senate's purge that followed the murder of the emperor in 268. However, some at least of his family seem to have escaped or had been spared - see preceding section.

== Conclusion ==
By any standards Volusianus's was a remarkable career. There is no way of knowing how he performed in his professional roles as a fighting soldier, a general or as an administrator and judge - which are likely to have been his main pre-occupations as Praetorian Prefect. Whatever his merits, the favour of Gallienus - possibly based on some family and/or social connection arising from a common Etruscan origin - seems to have been crucial at all stages. However, given the general quality of the men Gallienus appointed to high office, it seems unlikely that the Emperor would have advanced Volusianus to such heights on the mere basis of a shared origin had the man no other quality to recommend him.

== Citations ==
Political offices
Preceded by Publius Cornelius Saecularis, Gaius Iunius Donatus, Postumus, Honoratianus	Consul of the Roman Empire; 261 with Gallienus, Macrianus Minor, Quietus, Postumus	Succeeded by Gallienus, Nummius Faustianus
