= Aurelius Heraclianus =

Roman general and Praetorian Prefect (died 268)

Marcus(?) Aurelius Heraclianus (died 268) was a Roman soldier who rose to the rank of Praetorian Prefect in the latter part of the reign of the Emperor Gallienus. He was a member of the cabal of senior commanders of the Imperial field army that plotted and achieved the assassination of the Emperor Gallienus. His subsequent fate is uncertain. The only ancient reference has him committing suicide, but the circumstances are unclear.

== Biography ==
=== Origins ===
Heraclianus's praenomen is nowhere cited in the sources. It was not uncommon by the mid-third century for boys not to be given one. His nomen (i.e. 'Aurelius') was that commonly adopted by families admitted to Roman citizenship by Caracalla under the provisions of that Emperor's law known as the Constitutio Antoniniana. This came into force in 213 AD - i.e. probably the time around which Heraclianus was born.

His place of birth was most likely Thracia in the eastern Balkans. This supposition is suggested by an inscription dedicated to Heraclianus by a fellow-soldier, Traianus Mucianus (possibly a cliens of Heraclianus's family) that was discovered at the site of Mucianus's own hometown of Augusta Traiana in that province - now Stara Zagora in Bulgaria. A second memorial found in Stara Zagora, also by Traianus Mucianus, dedicated to Heraclianus's brother, Marcus Aurelius Apollinarius, who was an equestrian governor of Thrace, reinforces the notion that Heraclianus had strong family connections in that region and was most likely a citizen of Augusta Traiana.

Heraclianus's later association with Claudius Gothicus and Aurelian in the assassination of Gallienus - see below - also suggests that he had connections with the Illyrian clans that dominated the officer cadres of the Balkan garrisons in the 3rd century AD.

=== Career ===
Heraclianus rose to prominence during the troubled reign of the Emperor Gallienus becoming Praetorian Prefect – an office of state that combined the command of the Emperor's Praetorian Guard and principal ministry. Heraclianus probably became Praetorian Prefect in 267 following the appointment of Lucius Petronius Taurus Volusianus, the former Praetorian Prefect, as Urban Prefect - i.e. Imperial Governor of Rome - in that year.

Heraclianus was thus likely to have been a highly competent soldier who was either born into the Illyrian military élite or earned a place in their ranks by his behaviour in Gallienus's many wars against barbarian invaders and would-be usurpers.

The Vita Gallieni also asserts that he was the leader (Dux) of a force sent by Gallienus to the East to reassert imperial authority in the region after the death (assassination?) of Odenathus of Palmyra in 267, but was defeated and his army destroyed - presumably by Zenobia. This is the only ancient reference to such an attempt being made in Gallienus's reign and the usual caveat regarding the reliability of the Historia Augusta as a historical record must apply.

Alföldi suggests that Gallienus may have attempted to assert his authority in Asia if not in Syria and Mesopotamia after the death of Odenathus (vis-a-vis Palmyra not Persia), but the effort was negated by the barbarian invasions of the eastern Balkans of the final year of his reign. However, Alföldi does not believe that Rome and Palmyra actually engaged in hostilities as the Historia Augusta suggests. Bray is inclined to dismiss any notion of an expedition in 267–8.

This is also the conclusion of David Potter. However, Prof. Potter does make the interesting suggestion that Heraclianus might have made an expedition to the East to reassert Roman authority in the Asian provinces not in 267 - when he was almost certainly engaged in the Gothic war - but at the behest of Gallienus's murderer and successor, the Emperor Claudius Gothicus, in 270. This effort might either have been undertaken in response to aggression of Zenobia of Palmyra in Arabia and Egypt in that year or have been the cause of that aggression.

=== Downfall ===
Whether or not he was sent to the East in 267, it is likely that Heraclianus returned to Europe in time to take part in Gallienus's campaign against the Goths and Heruls in the Balkans in 267–8. The ancient sources are generally agreed that he was with Gallienus when the Emperor chose to abandon operations against these invaders and hurry to Italy when Aureolus launched his rebellion on behalf of the 'Gallic Emperor', Postumus, in Mediolanium and he was also a member of the triumvirate of senior officers who brought about Gallienus's assassination.

The cause(s) of the murderous displeasure of Heraclianus and his colleagues with Gallienus are unknowable. For a discussion of their possible issues with their Emperor see Bray. Whatever Heraclianus's motives, he does not seem to have benefited from his treason. His death by suicide may have followed soon afterwards. If Potter's thesis - see above - is correct, and he did live on to serve under Claudius II, a spectacular failure in Asia might explain why he chose to take his own life. However, it is unlikely that the circumstances of his death will ever be revealed.

== Sources ==
Heraclianus appears in the Historia Augusta (Vita Gallieni), Zonaras and Zosimus, but it is impossible to develop any sustained narrative of his life from the ancient sources.

The references are usefully listed by L. L. Howe in his book on the 3rd century Praetorian Prefect:

- Howe, Laurence Lee (1942). The Pretorian Prefect from Commodus to Diocletian (AD 180-305). Chicago, Illinois: University of Chicago Press Press.

The best recent summary of the available information on Heraclianus is to be found in John Bray's biography of Gallienus:

- Bray, John (1997). Gallienus - A study in Reformist and Sexual Politics. Adelaide: Wakefield Press.

See also:

- David S. Potter, The Roman Empire at Bay, Routledge, London & New York, 2004 and The Transformation of the Empire: 236-337 CE, Part II,8 p 164 of A Companion to the Roman Empire. Ed.D. S. Potter, Blackwell Publishing Ltd. 2006.
