= Quietus =

Usurper of the Roman Empire (died 261)

- Usurper of the Roman Empire
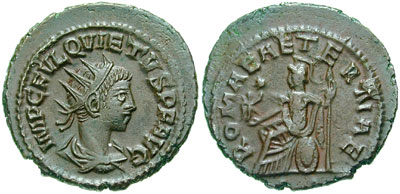
- Quietus on a coin celebrating Eternal Rome. (Note: The coinage of Quietus and of his brother and co-emperor Macrianus Minor celebrated the army, the confidence in victory, and the foreseen arrival of happy times. All of these themes were very important in a time of emergency, when the Roman Empire had lost its Emperor in battle against the Sassanid Empire.)
- Reign: 260-261 (with Macrianus Minor)
- Predecessor: Gallienus
- Successor: Gallienus
- Died: 261; Emesa, Syria
Names
- Titus Fulvius Junius Quietus
Regnal name
- Imperator Caesar Titus Fulvius Junius Quietus Augustus
- Father: Macrianus Major
- Mother: ? (of senatorial descent)

Titus Fulvius Junius Quietus (died 261) was a Roman usurper against Roman Emperor Gallienus.

== History ==
Quietus was the son of Fulvius Macrianus and a noblewoman, possibly named Junia. According to Historia Augusta, he was a military tribune under Valerian, but this information is challenged by historians.

He gained the imperial office with his brother Macrianus Minor, after the capture of Emperor Valerian in the Sassanid campaign of 260. With the lawful heir, Gallienus, being far away in the West, the soldiers elected the two emperors. The support of his father, controller of the imperial treasure, and the influence of Balista, Praetorian prefect of the late Emperor Valerian, proved instrumental in his promotion.

Quietus and Macrianus, elected consuls, had to face the Emperor Gallienus, at the time in the West. Quietus and Balista stayed in the eastern provinces, while his brother and father marched their army to Europe to seize control of the Roman Empire. After the defeat and deaths of his brother and father in Thrace in 261, Quietus lost the control of the provinces in favour of Septimus Odaenathus of Palmyra, a loyal client king of the Romans who had helped push the Persians out of the eastern provinces and recovered Roman Mesopotamia in 260. Forced to flee to the city of Emesa, he was besieged there by Odaenathus, during the course of which he was killed by its inhabitants, possibly instigated by Balista.

== Cultural depictions ==
Quietus appears in Harry Sidebottom's historical fiction novel series as one of the series' antagonists.

== Sources ==
- Körner, Christian (1999-12-06). "Usurpers in the east: The Macriani and Ballista", s.v. "Usurpers under Gallienus". De Imperatoribus Romanis. Archived from the original on 2016-03-03.
- Jones, A.H.M., Martindale, J.R. The Prosopography of the Later Roman Empire, Vol. I: AD260-395, Cambridge University Press, 1971

Political offices
Preceded by Publius Cornelius Saecularis, Gaius Junius Donatus, Postumus, Honoratianus	Consul of the Roman Empire; 261 with Macrianus Minor, Postumus, Gallienus, Lucius Petronius Taurus Volusianus	Succeeded by Gallienus, Nummius Faustianus
