= 197 =

197 may refer to:

- 197 (number)
- AD 197
- 197 BC
- 197 (New Jersey bus)
- UFC 197
- 197 Arete
- Jordan 197
- Arado Ar 197
- Lectionary 197
- Radical 197
- Kosmos 197
- Minuscule 197
- NGC 197

== See also ==
- 197th (disambiguation)
