= John Platts (Unitarian) =

John Platts (1775–1837) was an English Unitarian minister and author, a compiler of reference works.

== Life ==
He was born in Boston, Lincolnshire. For seven or eight years he officiated as a Calvinist minister there; but later he became a Unitarian, and acted as a Unitarian minister at Boston from 1805 to 1817. In 1817 he moved to Doncaster.

Platts supplemented his ministerial income by teaching and compiling educational works. He was also a Liberal activist, and humorous speaker. He died at Doncaster, after a long illness, on 19 June 1837. His widow died in 1851, leaving five daughters.

== Works ==
In 1825 Platts published five volumes of A New Universal Biography, containing lives of eminent persons in all ages and countries, arranged in chronological order, with alphabetical index. This work, founded mainly on previous works by John Aikin and Alexander Chalmers, extended only to the end of the sixteenth century; the rest remained in manuscript form. In 1827 appeared, Platts's New Self-interpreting Testament, containing many thousands of various Readings and Parallel Passages collected from the most approved Translators and Biblical Critics. In the preface the author claims to have combined the merits of Francis Fox and Clement Cruttwell. Another edition, in 4 vols. appeared in 1830.

Platts also published:

- ‘Reflections on Materialism, Immaterialism, the Sleep of the Soul … and the Resurrection of the Body; being an Attempt to prove that the Resurrection commences at Death,’ Boston, 1813.
- ‘Letter to a Young Man, on his renouncing the Christian Religion and becoming a Deist,’ 1820.
- ‘The Literary and Scientific Class-book,’ &c., 1821; a selection was published by L. W. Leonard in 1826.
- ‘Elements of Ecclesiastical History’ [1821?]
- ‘The Book of Curiosities; … with an Appendix of entertaining and amusing Experiments and Recreations’, 1822; a seventh American edition appeared at Philadelphia in 1856.
- ‘The Female Mentor, or Ladies' Class-book; being a new Selection of 365 Reading Lessons,’ &c., Derby, 1823.
- ‘A Dictionary of English Synonymes’ (for the use of schools), 1825.
- ‘The Manners and Customs of all Nations’ (engravings), 1827.
