= Gaius Junius Donatus =

Mid-3rd century Roman official and consul

Gaius Junius Donatus (fl. mid-third century) was a Roman politician, who was appointed consul twice, the second time in AD 260, during the Crisis of the Third Century.

== Biography ==
A member of a noble family and perhaps of North African descent, Donatus was appointed as Consul suffectus sometime prior to AD 257. In that year, he was made Urban Prefect of Rome, and is noted as “our friend” in correspondence from the emperors Valerian and Gallienus. During his time as Urban Prefect, he was involved in the persecution of Christians in the city.

In AD 260, Donatus was appointed consul posterior alongside Publius Cornelius Saecularis. He held office during the tumultuous period which saw the capture of the emperor Valerian in the east and the rebellion of Postumus in Gaul.

== Sources ==
- Christol, Michel, Essai sur l'évolution des carrières sénatoriales dans la seconde moitié du IIIe siècle ap. J.C. (1986)
- Martindale, John R.; Jones, A. H. M.; Morris, John, eds. (1971). The Prosopography of the Later Roman Empire: Volume I, AD 260–395. Cambridge: Cambridge University Press. ISBN 0-521-07233-6.

Political offices
Preceded by Uncertain	Consul suffectus of the Roman Empire before 257 with uncertain	Succeeded by Uncertain
Preceded by Aemilianus; Pomponius Bassus	Consul of the Roman Empire; 260 with Publius Cornelius Saecularis II	Succeeded by Publius Licinius Gallienus Augustus IV; Lucius Petronius Taurus Volusianus
