= Macrianus Minor =

Usurper of throne of Roman Empire (died 261)

- Usurper of the Roman Empire
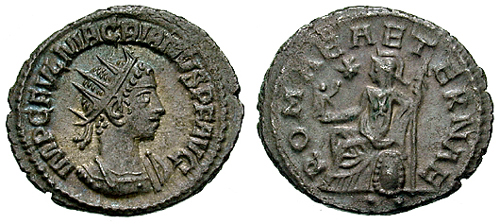
- Macrianus on a coin celebrating Eternal Rome.
- Reign: 260-261 (with Quietus)
- Predecessor: Gallienus
- Successor: Gallienus
- Died: 261; Illyricum
Names
- Titus Fulvius Junius Macrianus
Regnal name
- Imperator Caesar Titus Fulvius Iunius Macrianus Augustus
- Father: Macrianus Major
- Mother: Junia (possibly)

Titus Fulvius Junius Macrianus (died 261), also known as Macrianus Minor, was a Roman usurper. He was the son of Fulvius Macrianus, also known as Macrianus Major.

== Career ==
Although his father was from an equestrian family, Macrianus Minor's mother was of noble birth and of senatorial descent and her name, possibly, was Junia. According to the often unreliable Historia Augusta, he had served as military tribune under Valerian.

Macrianus, his father and his brother Quietus, were in Mesopotamia in 260, for the Sassanid campaign of Emperor Valerian, when the Roman army was defeated, and the emperor was captured. With help from his father, who kept the imperial treasure, and by the influence of Balista, Valerian's praefect, Macrianus gained the imperial office together with his brother Quietus, through the election by the army, in contrast with the lawful Emperor Gallienus, son and co-emperor with Valerian, who was far in the West. The two emperors and brothers were recognized in the eastern part of the Empire, having a stronghold in Egypt, the grain supplying province for the city of Rome.

After having temporarily secured the Persian frontier, Macrianus Major and Macrianus Minor moved to the West to attack and eliminate their rival Gallienus. They were however defeated in autumn 261 by Aureolus, and later killed by their own soldiers at the father's request.

== Cultural depictions ==
Macrianus appears in Harry Sidebottom's historical fiction novel series as one of the series' antagonists..

== See also ==
- Gallienus usurpers

== Sources ==
Media related to Macrianus Minor at Wikimedia Commons

- Körner, Christian, "Usurpers in the east: The Macriani and Ballista", s.v. "Usurpers under Gallienus", De Imperatoribus Romanis
- Jones, A.H.M., Martindale, J.R. The Prosopography of the Later Roman Empire, Vol. I: AD260-395, Cambridge University Press, 1971

Political offices
Preceded by Publius Cornelius Saecularis , Gaius Junius Donatus, Postumus, Honoratianus	Consul of the Roman Empire; 261 with Quietus , Postumus, Gallienus, Lucius Petronius Taurus Volusianus	Succeeded by Gallienus , Nummius Faustianus
