= Publius Cornelius Saecularis =

3rd century Roman senator and consul

Publius Cornelius Saecularis (fl. mid-third century) was a Roman politician who was appointed consul twice, first in around AD 240 and later in AD 260, during the Crisis of the Third Century.

== Biography ==
Saecularis was a Roman senator who was appointed Consul suffectus around AD 240. He was later appointed the Proconsular governor of Africa around AD 254, during which time an inscription was erected in his honor at the city of Leptis Magna.

From AD 258 – 260 he served as Praefectus urbi of Rome. During his term as Urban Prefect, he was in left charge of Rome at a time when both emperors were absent; Valerian in the east, and Gallienus along the Danube frontier. It is therefore believed that Saecularis was related to the empress Cornelia Salonina. During this period, Saecularis was also involved in the persecution of Christians in the city. In one example, he is said to have ordered Saint Lawrence to hand over all of the Church's wealth in Rome, and Lawrence's defiance is said to have led to his martyrdom.

In AD 260, Saecularis was appointed consul prior alongside Gaius Iunius Donatus. He held office during the tumultuous period which saw the capture of the emperor Valerian in the east and the rebellion of Postumus in Gaul.

He was probably the last member of the old republican gens Cornelia to receive a consulship.

== Sources ==
- Christol, Michel, Essai sur l'évolution des carrières sénatoriales dans la seconde moitié du IIIe siècle ap. J.C. (1986)
- Martindale, John R.; Jones, A. H. M.; Morris, John, eds. (1971). The Prosopography of the Later Roman Empire: Volume I, AD 260–395. Cambridge: Cambridge University Press. ISBN 0-521-07233-6.

Political offices
Preceded by Uncertain	Consul suffectus of the Roman Empire around 240 with uncertain	Succeeded by Uncertain
Preceded by Aemilianus; Pomponius Bassus	Consul of the Roman Empire; 260 with Gaius Iunius Donatus II	Succeeded by Publius Licinius Gallienus Augustus IV; Lucius Petronius Taurus Volusianus
