= Odaenathus =

King of Palmyra from 260 to 267

Odaenathus 𐡠𐡣𐡩𐡮𐡶 أذينة
- King of Palmyra; King of Kings of the East (Western Aramaic: Mlk Mlk dy Mdnh)
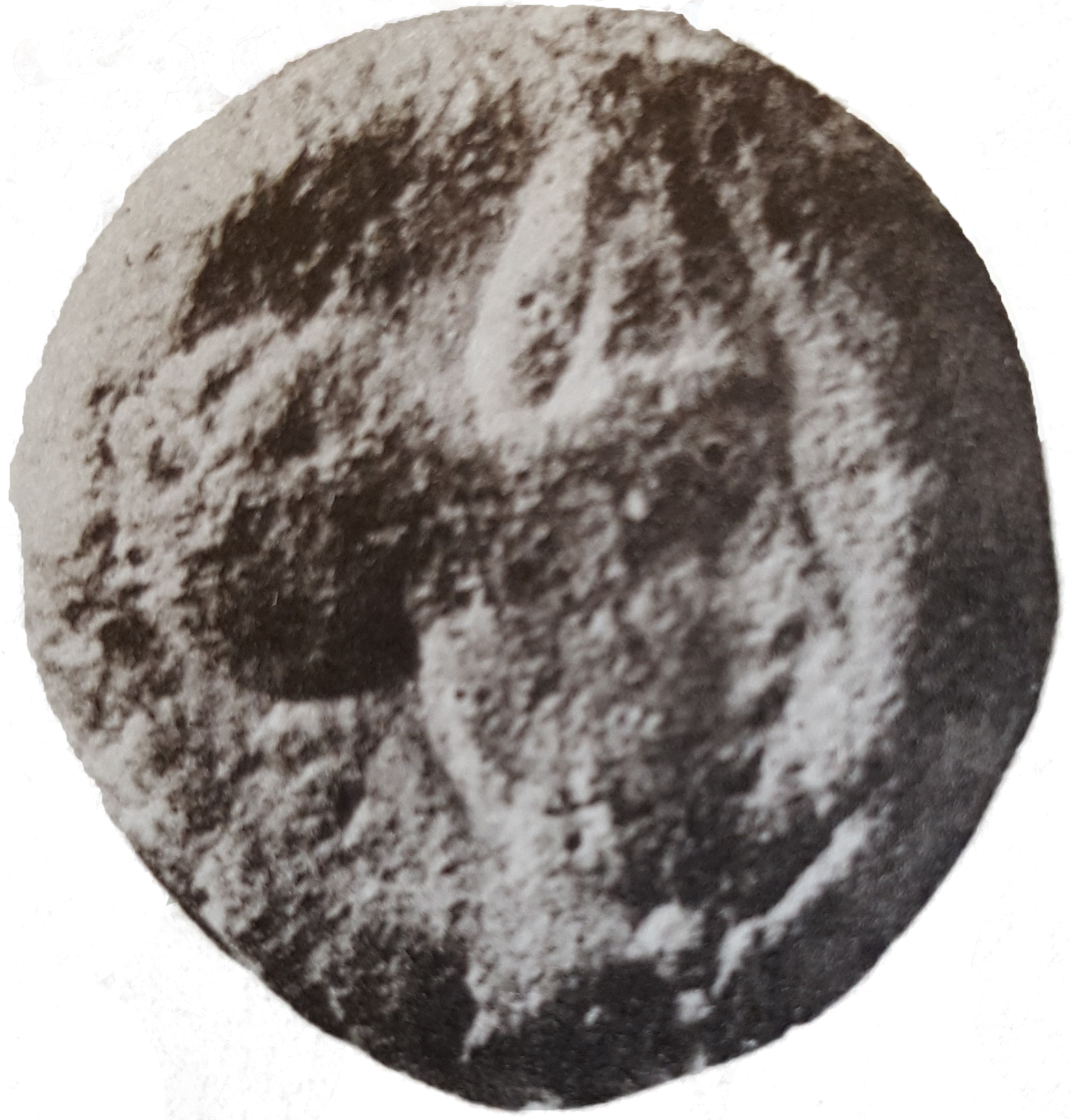
- A clay tessera bearing a possible depiction of Odaenathus wearing a tiara

King of Kings of the East
- Reign: 263–267
- Predecessor: Title created
- Successor: Vaballathus
- Co-ruler: Hairan I

King of Palmyra
- Reign: 260–267
- Predecessor: Himself as Ras of Palmyra
- Successor: Vaballathus

Ras (lord) of Palmyra
- Reign: 240s–260
- Predecessor: Office established
- Successor: Himself as King of Palmyra
- Born: c. 220; Palmyra, Roman Syria
- Died: 267 (aged 46–47); Heraclea Pontica (modern-day Karadeniz Ereğli, Turkey), or Emesa (modern-day Homs, Syria)
- Spouse: Zenobia
- Issue: Hairan I (Herodianus); Vaballathus; Hairan II
Names
- Septimius Odainat
- House: House of Odaenathus
- Father: Hairan

Septimius Odaenathus (Palmyrene Aramaic: 𐡠𐡣𐡩𐡮𐡶, romanized: ʾŌdaynaṯ; Arabic: أذينة, romanized: Uḏayna; c. 220 – 267) was the founding king (malik) of the Palmyrene Kingdom who ruled from Palmyra, Syria. He elevated the status of his kingdom from a regional center subordinate to Rome into a formidable state in South-West Asia. Odaenathus was born into an aristocratic Palmyrene family that had received Roman citizenship in the 190s under the Severan Dynasty. He was the son of Hairan, the descendant of Nasor. The circumstances surrounding his rise are ambiguous; he became the lord (ras) of the city, a position created for him, as early as the 240s and by 258, he was styled a consularis, indicating a high status in the Roman Empire.

The defeat and captivity of Emperor Valerian at the hands of the Sasanian emperor Shapur I in 260 left the eastern Roman provinces largely at the mercy of the Persians. Odaenathus remained on the side of Rome; assuming the title of king, he led the Palmyrene army, attacking the Persians before they could cross the Euphrates to the eastern bank, inflicting a considerable defeat. He took the side of Emperor Gallienus, the son and successor of Valerian, who was facing the attempted usurpation of Fulvius Macrianus. The rebel declared his sons emperors, leaving one in Syria and taking the other with him to Europe. Odaenathus attacked the remaining usurper and quelled the rebellion. He was rewarded with many exceptional titles by the Emperor, who formalized his self-established position in the East. In reality, the Emperor may have done little but accept the declared nominal loyalty of Odaenathus.

In a series of rapid and successful campaigns starting in 262, Odaenathus crossed the Euphrates and recovered Carrhae and Nisibis. He then took the offensive into the heartland of Persia, and arrived at the walls of its capital, Ctesiphon. The city withstood the short siege but Odaenathus reclaimed the entirety of the Roman lands occupied by the Persians since the Battle of Edessa. Odaenathus celebrated his victories and declared himself "King of Kings", crowning his son Herodianus as co-king. By 263, Odaenathus was in effective control of the Levant, Roman Mesopotamia and Anatolia's eastern region.

Odaenathus observed all due formalities towards the Emperor, but in practice ruled as an independent monarch. In 266, he launched a second invasion of Persia but had to abandon the campaign and head north to Bithynia to repel the attacks of Germanic raiders besieging the city of Heraclea Pontica. He was assassinated in 267 during or immediately after the Anatolian campaign, together with Herodianus. The identities of the perpetrator or the instigator are unknown and many stories, accusations and speculations exist in ancient sources. He was succeeded by his son Vaballathus under the regency of his widow Zenobia, who used the power established by Odaenathus to forge the Palmyrene Empire in 270.

== Name, family and appearance ==
"Odaenathus" is the Latin transliteration of the king's name; (Note: The Greek transliterations (Ancient Greek: Ὀδαίναθος Odaínathos or Ὠδέναθος Ōdénathos), and the Latin ones (Latin: Odaenathus, Odenathus, Odinatus or Ordinatus), are more or less corrupted transliterations of the Palmyrene and the Arabic respectively.) he was born Septimius Odainat in c. 220. (Note: The 220 date was proposed by the archaeologist Michael Gawlikowski, head of the Polish archaeological expedition in Palmyra; the archaeologist Ernest Will, however, maintained that the king was born c. 200.) His name is written in transliterated Palmyrene as Sptmyws ʾDynt. "Sptmyws" (Septimius), which means "born in September", was Odaenathus' family gentilicium (Roman surname), adopted as an expression of loyalty to the Roman Severan dynasty and the emperor Septimius Severus who had granted the family Roman citizenship in the late second century. ʾDynt (Odainat) is the Palmyrene diminutive for ear, related to Uḏaina in Arabic and 'Ôden in Aramaic. Odaenathus' genealogy is known from a stone block in Palmyra with a sepulchral inscription that mentions the building of a tomb and records the genealogy of the builder: Odaenathus, son of Hairan, son of Wahb Allat, son of Nasor. In rabbinic sources, Odaenathus is named "Papa ben Nasor" (Papa son of Nasor); (Note: According to the authors of the Genesis Rabbah (76,6), a verse from the Book of Daniel (7.8) refers to a certain ben Nasor, who was identified as Odaenthus by several modern historians and Talmudic scholars, including Heinrich Graetz, Marcus Jastrow and Saul Lieberman. The rabbi Solomon Funk considered ben Nasor a relative of Odaenathus, while the historian Jacob Neusner considered it possible that ben Nasor was either Odaenathus or a family member of his. According to the historian Lukas de Blois, Odaenathus is the strongest candidate; in Ketuboth (51B), ben Nasor is mentioned as king, and the only known king with the name "Nasor" mentioned in his genealogy is Odaenathus.) the meaning of the name "Papa" and how Odaenathus earned it is unclear. (Note: According to the historian Louis Feldman, Papa is likely a Latin translation of the Semitic Abba (father). Papa was a proper name used in Hatra, and several Jewish Amoraim bore the names "Pappa" (Ppʿ) or "Pappus" (Ppws), from the root ppy or pph, which means "talk in a proud manner"; according to the historian Udo Hartmann, it is possible that the rabbis named Odaenathus Papa for his arrogance. It is also possible that since Odaenathus' grandfather was a son of Nasor, Papa is a Greek loanward related to πάππος (páppos), meaning grandfather.)

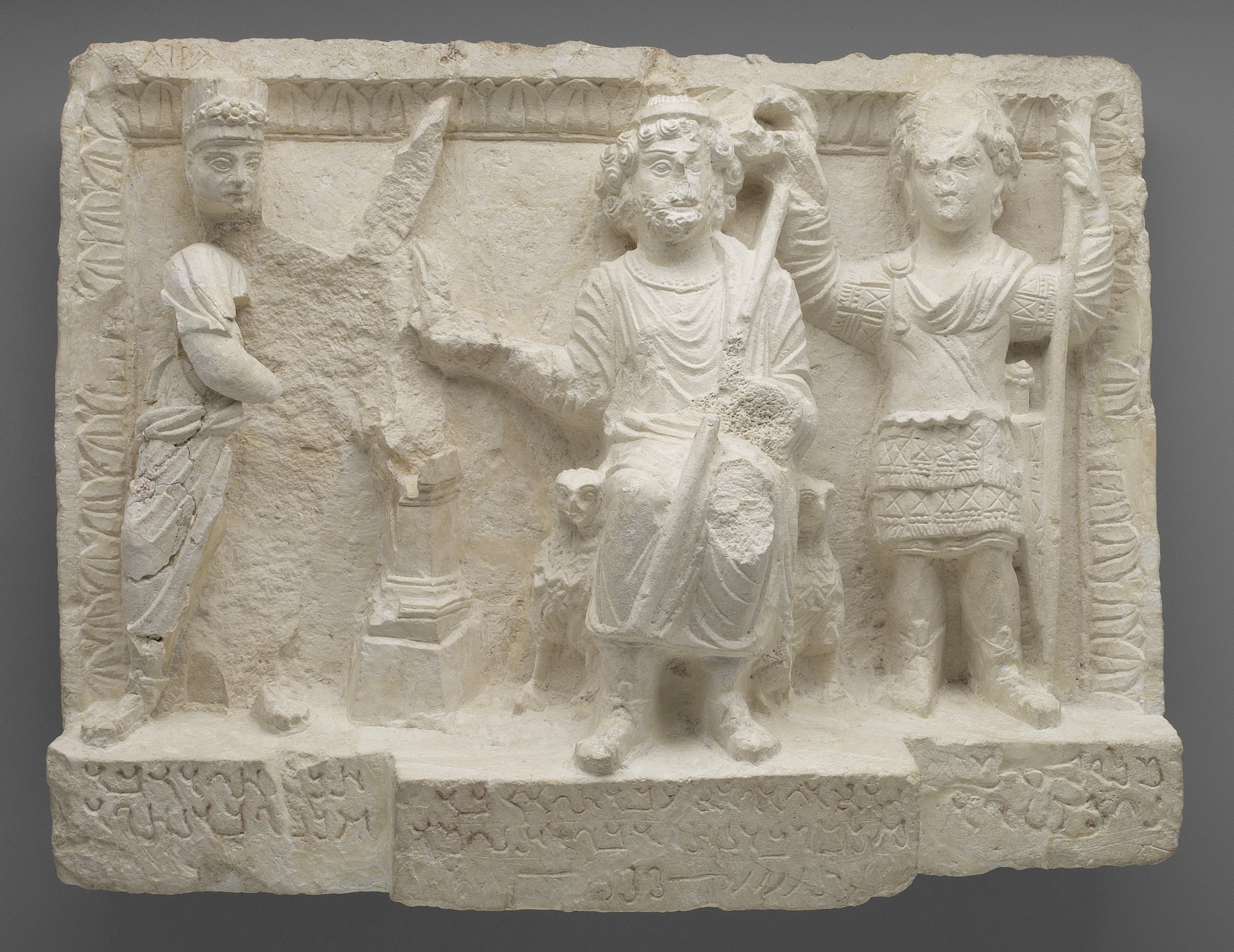
Relief from the Temple of the Gadde at Dura-Europos depicting the god "Gad" of Dura (center), King Seleucus I Nicator (right) and Hairan son of Maliko son of Nasor, a possible relative of Odaenathus (left).

The king appears to be of mixed Arab and Aramean descent: his name, the name of his father, Hairan, and that of his grandfather, Wahb-Allat, are Arabic; while Nasor, his great-grandfather, has an Aramaic name. Nasor might not have been the great-grandfather of Odaenathus, but a more distant ancestor; the archaeologist Frank Edward Brown considered Nasor to be Odaenathus' great-great or great-great-great grandfather. This has led some scholars, such as Lisbeth Soss Fried and Javier Teixidor, to consider the origin of the family to be Aramean. In practice, the citizenry of Palmyra was the result of Arab and Aramaean tribes merging into a unity with a corresponding consciousness; they thought and acted as Palmyrenes.

The fifth-century historian Zosimus asserted that Odaenathus descended from "illustrious forebears", (Note: Odaenathus is mentioned as the "lowest of the kings" in the Book of Elijah, which is a collection of texts dating to different periods, such as pieces from 1 Kings, an apocalyptic depiction of the Sassanid fights against Rome, and an Abrahamic apocalypse depicting Israel's exaltation and the pagan world's humiliation. The sixth-century Byzantine historian Agathias mentioned Odaenathus as a man of low birth. The statement of Zosimus contradicts those low birth accounts. In the view of the historian Averil Cameron, the phrase used by Agathias, ἀφανὴς μὲν τὰ πρῶτα (aphanḗs men ta prṓta), is an antithesis to μεγίστην ἀράμενος δόξαν (megístēn arámenos dóxan), and Agathias used the same phrase to describe the first Sasanian king Ardashir I, who traced his descent to the Avestan and Achaemenid kings.) but the position of the family in Palmyra is debated; it was probably part of the wealthy mercantile class. Alternatively, the family may have belonged to the tribal leadership that amassed a fortune as landowners and patrons of the Palmyrene caravans. (Note: Palmyrene caravan patrons owned the land on which the caravan animals were raised, providing animals and guards for the merchants who led the caravans.) The historians Franz Altheim and Ruth Stiehl suggested that Odaenathus was part of a new elite of Bedouins driven from their home east of the Euphrates by the aggressive Sassanian dynasty after 220. However, it is certain that Odaenathus came from a family that had belonged to the upper class of the city for several generations; in Dura-Europos, a relief dated to 159/158 (470 of the Seleucid era, SE) was commissioned by Hairan son of Maliko son of Nasor. (Note: Each Seleucid year started in the late autumn of a Gregorian year; thus, a Seleucid year overlaps two Gregorian ones.) This Hairan might have been the head of the Palmyrene trade colony in Dura-Europos and probably belonged to the same family as Odaenathus. According to Brown, it is plausible, based on the occurrence of the name Nasor in both Dura-Europos and Palmyra (where it was a rare name), that Odaenathus and Hairan son of Maliko belonged to the same family.

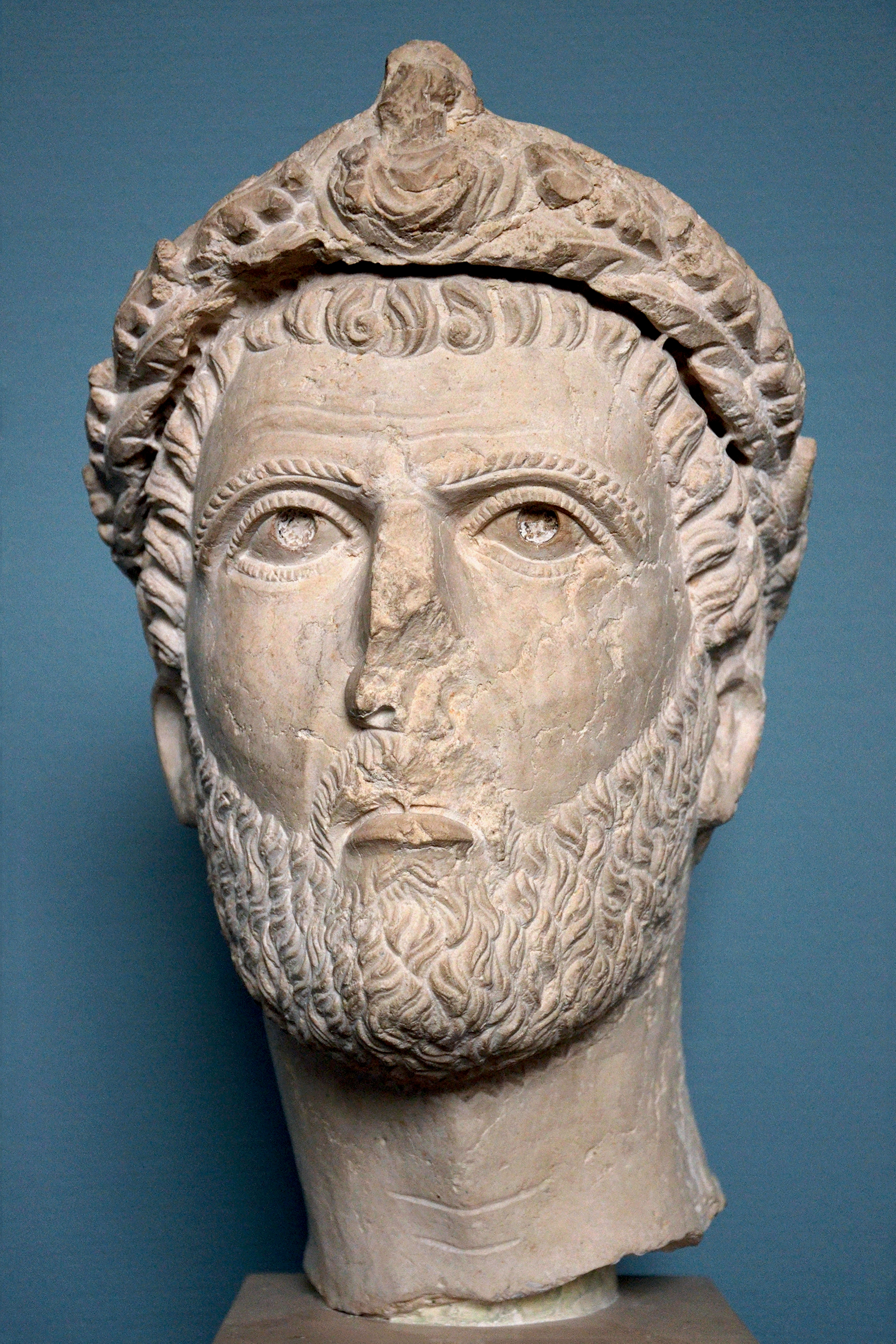
Odaenathus' alleged portrait from the Ny Carlsberg Glyptotek museum

No definite images of Odaenathus have been discovered, hence, there is no information about his appearance; all sculptures identified as Odaenathus lack any inscriptions to confirm whom they represent. Two sculpted heads from Palmyra, one preserved in the Ny Carlsberg Glyptotek museum and the other in the Archaeological Museum in Istanbul, were identified by the archaeologist Harald Ingholt as representing Odaenathus based on their monumentality and regal style. The academic consensus does not support Ingholt's view, and the heads he ascribed to the king can be dated to the end of the second century. More likely, two marble heads, one depicting a man wearing a royal tiara, the crown of Palmyra, and the other depicting a man in a royal Hellenistic diadem, are depictions of the king. In addition, a Palmyrene clay tessera, depicting a bearded man wearing a diadem, could be a portrait of the king.

=== Odaenathus I ===
Traditional scholarship, based on the sepulchral inscription from Odaenathus' tomb, believed the builder to be an ancestor of the king and he was given the designation "Odaenathus I". (Note: This assumption was facilitated by a passage in the work of Anonymus post Dionem, usually associated with the sixth-century historians Eustathius of Epiphania or Peter the Patrician, which speaks about a younger Odaenathus asking the Roman emperor to punish his official Rufinus for the latter's role in assassinating an elder Odaenathus. For information see Assassination of Odaenathus: Roman conspiracy.) The name of King Odaenathus' father is Hairan as attested in many inscriptions. In an inscription dated to 251, the name of the ras ("lord") of Palmyra, Hairan, son of Odaenathus, is written, and he was thought to be the son of Odaenathus I. Prior to the 1980s, the earliest known inscription attesting King Odaenathus was dated to 257, leading traditional scholarship to believe that Hairan, ras of Palmyra, was the father of the king and that Odaenathus I was his grandfather. (Note: The archaeologist William Waddington considered King Odaenathus the son of ras Hairan while the historian Theodor Mommsen considered the latter an older brother of the king.) However, an inscription published in 1985 by the archaeologist Michael Gawlikowski and dated to 252 mentions King Odaenathus as a ras and records the same genealogy found in the sepulchral inscription, confirming the name of King Odaenathus' grandfather as Wahb Allat; thus, he cannot be a son of Hairan son of Odaenathus (I). Therefore, it is certain that King Odaenathus was the builder of the tomb, ruling out the existence of "Odaenathus I". (Note: Although the conclusions of Gawlikowski became the academic consensus, the archaeologist Jean-Charles Balty argued that Odaenathus who built the tomb was not the same as King Odaenathus, stating that a new inscription can alter everything formerly known about the family.) The ras Hairan mentioned in the 251 inscription is identical with Odaenathus' elder son and co-ruler, Prince Hairan I.

== Rise ==
Palmyra was an autonomous city within the Roman Empire, subordinate to Rome and part of the province of Syria Phoenice. Odaenathus descended from an aristocratic family, albeit not a royal one as the city was ruled by a council and had no tradition of hereditary monarchy. For most of its existence, the Palmyrene army was decentralized under the command of several generals, but the rise of the Sassanian Empire in 224, and its incursions, which affected Palmyrene trade, combined with the weakness of the Roman Empire, probably prompted the Palmyrene council to elect a lord for the city in order for him to lead a strengthened army:

=== Ras of Palmyra ===
The Roman emperor, Gordian III, died in 244 during a campaign against Persia and this might have been the event which led to the election of a lord for Palmyra to defend it: Odaenathus, whose elevation, according to the historian Udo Hartmann, can be explained by Odaenathus probably being a successful military or caravan commander, and his descent from one of the most influential families in the city. Odaenathus' title as lord was ras in Palmyrene and exarchos in Greek as revealed by bilingual inscriptions from Palmyra. (Note: The dated inscriptions mentioning the title are from October 251 and April 252: the 251 inscription refers to Odaenathus' eldest son Hairan I as ras, while the 252 inscription refers to Odaenathus. Although the first known inscription attesting Odaenathus' title dates to 252, it is confirmed that he rose to the position at least one year earlier, based on Hairan I's attestation as ras in 251, and it is probable that he took the title in the aftermath of Gordian III's death.) The ras title enabled the bearer to effectively deal with the Sassanid threat, in that it probably vested in him supreme civil and military authority; (Note: Whether the ras title indicates a military or a priestly position is not known, but the military role is the more likely.) an undated inscription refers to Odaenathus as a ras and records the gift of a throne to him by a Palmyrene citizen named "Ogeilu son of Maqqai Haddudan Hadda", which confirms the supreme character of Odaenathus' title. The office was created for Odaenathus, and was not a usual title in the Roman Empire, and not a part of Palmyrene government traditions.

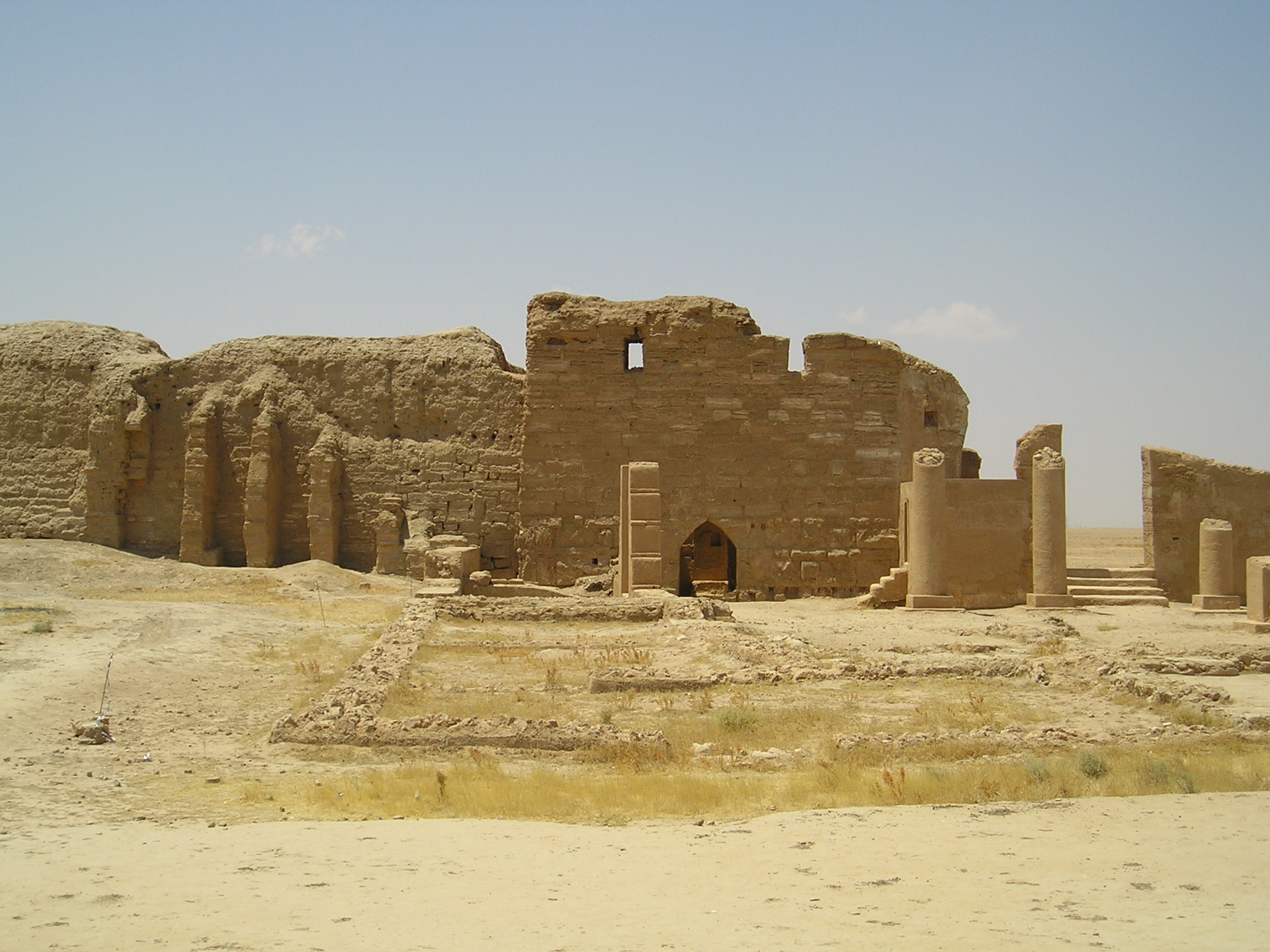
The temple of Bel, belonging to the Palmyrene colony in Dura-Europos; destroyed by the Sassanians in 256. (Note: There are two temples of Bel in Dura-Europos; the first was established by the Palmyrenes in the early first century outside the city wall in the necropolis and the second (depicted in this picture, also named "the temple of the Palmyrene gods") was administered by Palmyrenes only in the third century.)

Hairan I was apparently elevated to co-lordship by his father, as an inscription from 251 testifies. As early as the 240s, Odaenathus bolstered the Palmyrene army, recruiting desert nomads and increasing the number of the Palmyrene heavy cavalry (clibanarii). In 252, the Persian emperor, Shapur I, started a full-scale invasion of the Roman provinces in the east. During the second campaign of the invasion, Shapur I conquered Antioch on the Orontes, the traditional capital of Syria, and headed south, where his advance was checked in 253 by a noble from Emesa, Uranius Antoninus. The events of 253 were mentioned in the works of the sixth-century historian John Malalas who also mentioned a leader by the name "Enathus" inflicting a defeat upon the retreating Shapur I near the Euphrates. "Enathus" is probably identical with Odaenathus, and while Malalas' account indicates that Odaenathus defeated the Persians in 253, there is no proof that the Palmyrene leader engaged Shapur I before 260 and Malalas' account seems to be confusing Odaenathus' future actions during 260 with the events of 253.

Shapur I destroyed the Palmyrene trade colonies along the Euphrates, including the colonies at Anah in 253 and at Dura-Europos in 256. The sixth-century historian Peter the Patrician wrote that Odaenathus approached Shapur I to negotiate Palmyrene interests but was rebuffed and the gifts sent to the Persians were thrown into the river. The date for the attempted negotiations is debated: some scholars, including John F. Drinkwater, set the event in 253; while others, such as Alaric Watson, set it in 256, following the destruction of Dura-Europos.

=== Governor of Syria Phoenice ===
Several inscriptions dating to the end of 257 or early 258 show Odaenathus bearing the Greek title ὁ λαμπρότατος ὑπατικός (ho lamprótatos hupatikós; Latin: clarissimus consularis). This title was usually bestowed on Roman senators who held the consulship. The title was also mentioned in Odaenathus' undated tomb inscription and Hairan I was mentioned with the same title in the 251 inscription. Scholarly opinions vary on the exact date of Odaenathus' elevation to this position. Gawlikowski and the linguist Jean Starcky maintained that the senatorial rank predates the ras elevation. Hartmann concluded that Odaenathus first became a ras in the 240s, then a senator in 250. Another possibility is that the senatorial rank and lordship occurred simultaneously; Odaenathus was chosen as a ras following Gordian's death, then, after Emperor Philip the Arab concluded a peace treaty with the Persians, the Emperor ratified Odaenathus' lordship and admitted him to the senate to guarantee Palmyra's continued subordination.

The clarissimus consularis title could be a mere honorific or a sign that Odaenathus was appointed as the legatus of Phoenice. However, the title (ὁ λαμπρότατος ὑπατικός) was sometimes used in Syria to denote the provincial governor and the archaeologist William Waddington proposed that Odaenathus was indeed the governor of Phoenice. (Note: The educator Hermann Schiller rejected that Odaenathus was a governor of Phoenice; the title (ὁ λαμπρότατος ὑπατικός) was also attested in Palmyra for different notables and it could have been an honorary title of high degree.) Five of the inscriptions mentioning Odaenathus as consul are dated to 569 SE (258) during which no governor for Phoenice is attested, which might indicate that this was Odaenathus' year of governorship. In Phoenice's capital city Tyre, the lines "To Septimius Odaenathus, the most illustrious. The Septimian colony of Tyre" were found inscribed on a marble base; the inscription is not dated and if it was made after 257 then it indicates that Odaenathus was appointed as the governor of the province. These speculations cannot be proven, but as a governor Odaenathus would have been the highest authority in the province, above legionary commanders and provincial officials; this would make him commander of the Roman forces in the province. Whatever the case may be, starting from 258 Odaenathus strengthened his position and extended his political influence in the region. By 260, Odaenathus held the rank, credibility and power to pacify the Roman East following the Battle of Edessa.

== Reign ==
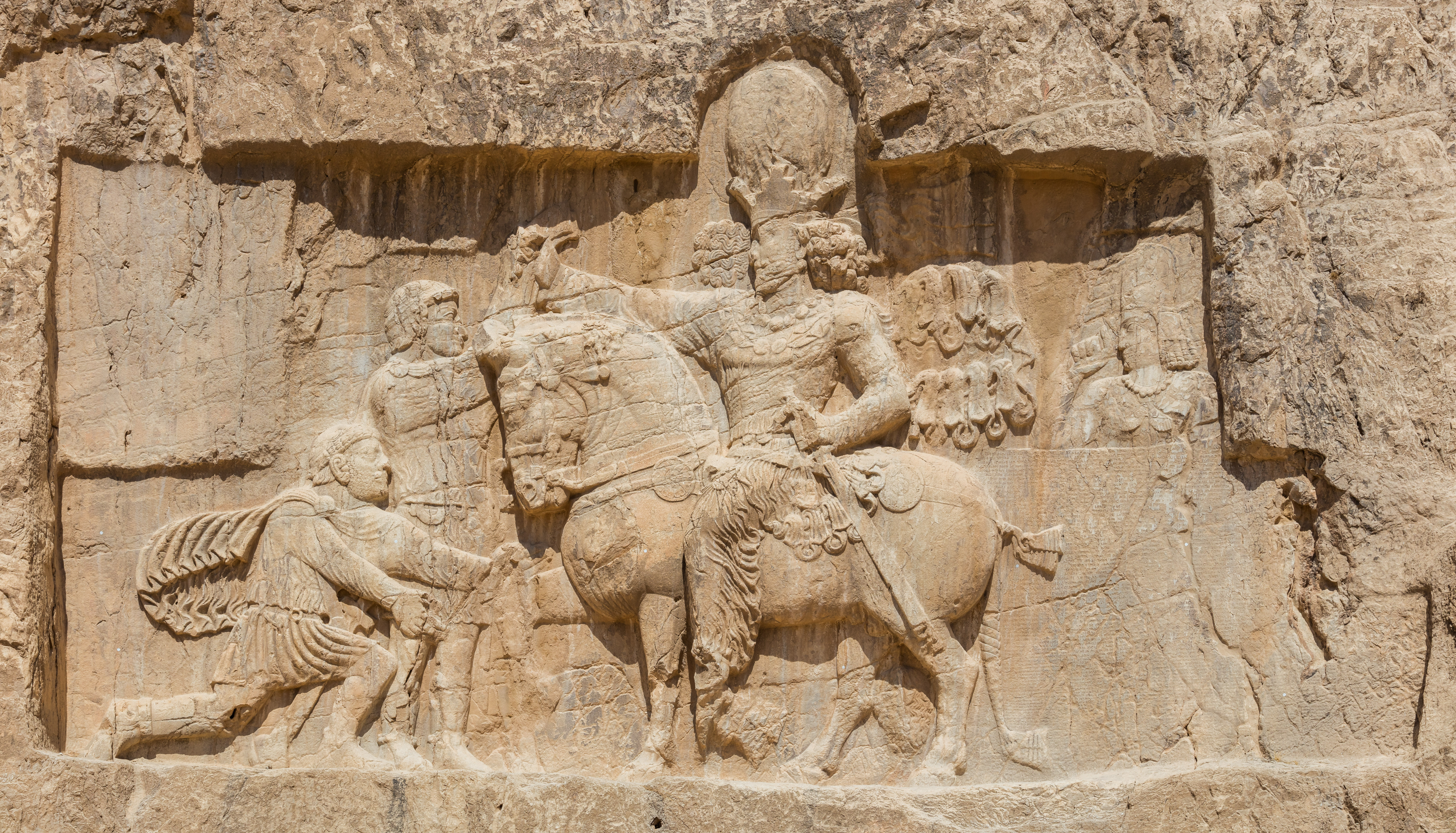
Bas relief depicting the triumph of Shapur I over Valerian

Faced with Shapur I's third campaign, the Roman emperor Valerian marched against the Persian monarch but was defeated near Edessa in late spring 260 and taken prisoner. The Persian emperor then ravaged Cappadocia and Cilicia, and claimed to have captured Antioch on the Orontes. (Note: There is no proof that Shapur I entered the central areas of northern Syria; he seems to have moved directly west into Cilicia.) Taking advantage of the situation, Fulvius Macrianus, the commander of the imperial treasury, declared his sons Quietus and Macrianus Minor as joint emperors in August 260, in opposition to Valerian's son Gallienus. (Note: At first Fulvius Macrianus showed loyalty to Gallienus.) Fulvius Macrianus took Antioch on the Orontes as his center and organized the resistance against Shapur I; he dispatched Balista, his praetorian prefect, to Anatolia. Shapur I was defeated in the region of Sebaste at Pompeiopolis, prompting the Persians to evacuate Cilicia while Balista returned to Antioch on the Orontes. Balista's victory was only partial: Shapur I withdrew east of Cilicia, which Persian units continued to occupy. A Persian force took advantage of Balista's return to Syria and headed further west into Anatolia. According to the Augustan History, Odaenathus was declared king of Palmyra as soon as the news of the Roman defeat at Edessa reached the city. It is not known if Odaenathus contacted Fulvius Macrianus and there is no evidence that he took orders from him.

=== Persian war of 260 and pacifying Syria ===
Odaenathus assembled the Palmyrene army and Syrian peasants, then marched north to meet the Persian emperor, who was returning to Persia. (Note: Zosimus wrote that Odaenathus' army, with which he fought Shapur I in 260, included his own Palmyrene troops and remnants of Valerian's Roman legions. No evidence exists for Roman units in his ranks, but it is possible, considering that he was fighting in the vicinity of Roman legionary bases. Troops based there might have been loyal to Gallienus and thus have chosen to join Odaenathus. Whether Roman soldiers fought under Odaenathus or not is a matter of speculation. The peasant element in the army was mentioned in the writings of later historians, such as the fourth century writers Festus and Orosius; the latter called the army of Odaenathus manus agrestis syrorum, leading the historian Edward Gibbon to portray Odaenathus' troops as a "scratch army of peasants". The historian Richard Stoneman rejected Gibbon's conclusion, arguing that the success of the Palmyrenes against Shapur I and the victories achieved by Zenobia following her husband's death, which brought Syria, Egypt and Anatolia under Palmyrene authority, can hardly be ascribed to an ill-equipped, untrained peasant army. It is more logical to interpret agrestis as denoting troops from outside the urban centres, and thus, it can be concluded that Odaenathus levied his cavalrymen from the regions surrounding Palmyra where horses were normally bred and kept.) The Palmyrene monarch fell upon the retreating Persian army between Samosata and Zeugma, west of the Euphrates, in late summer 260. (Note: The account of Odaenathus attacking the retreating Persians is according to the eighth century historian Syncellus.) He defeated the Persians, expelling Shapur I from the province of Syria. In early 261, Fulvius Macrianus headed to Europe accompanied by Macrianus Minor, leaving Quietus and Balista in Emesa. Odaenathus' whereabouts during this episode are not clear; he could have distributed the army in garrisons along the frontier or might have brought it back to his capital. The Palmyrene monarch seems to have waited until the situation clarified, declaring loyalty to neither Fulvius Macrianus nor Gallienus. In the spring of 261, Fulvius Macrianus arrived in the Balkans but was defeated and killed along with Macrianus Minor; Odaenathus, when it became clear that Gallienus would eventually win, sided with the Emperor and marched on Emesa, where Quietus and Balista were staying. The Emesans killed Quietus as Odaenathus approached the city, while Balista was captured and executed by the King in autumn 261.

==== Ruler of the East ====
The elimination of the usurpers left Odaenathus as the most powerful leader in the Roman East. He was granted many titles by the Emperor but those honors are debated among scholars:

- Dux Romanorum (commander of the Romans) was probably given to Odaenathus to recognize his position as the commander in chief of the forces in the east against the Persians; it was inherited by Odaenathus' son and successor Vaballathus.

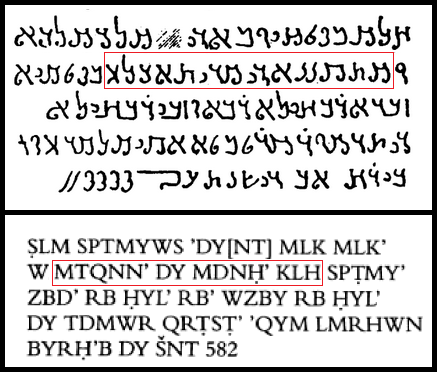
Drawing of the posthumous dedication to Odaenathus attesting him as Corrector (upper section). Palmyrene letters transcribed into Latin (lower section)

- Corrector totius orientis (righter of the entire East): it is generally accepted by modern scholars that he bore this title. A corrector had overall command of Roman armies and authority over provincial governors in his designated region. There are no known attestations of the title during Odaenathus' lifetime. Evidence for the King bearing the title consists of two inscriptions in Palmyrene: one posthumous dedication describing him as MTQNNʿ of the East (derived from the Semitic root TQN, meaning to set in order); (Note: The root TQN exists in several languages: Aramaic (meaning "to prepare", "to fix", "set in order"), Akkadian (where the word taqan means "be settled", "in order"), Arabic (meaning "improve", "fix", "set in order").) and the other describing his heir Vaballathus with the same title, albeit using the word PNRTTʿ instead of MTQNNʿ.

However, the sort of authority accorded by this position is widely debated. The problem arises from the word MTQNNʿ; its exact meaning is unclear. The word is translated into Latin as corrector, but "restitutor" is another possible translation; the latter title was an honorary one meant to praise the bearer for driving enemies out of Roman territories. However, the inscription of Vaballathus is clearer, as the word PNRTTʿ is not a Palmyrene word but a direct Palmyrene transliteration of the Greek term Epanorthotes, which is usually an equivalent to a corrector.

According to the historian David Potter, Vaballathus inherited his father's exact titles. Hartmann points out that there have been cases where a Greek word was translated directly to Palmyrene and a Palmyrene equivalent was also used to mean the same thing. The dedication to Odaenathus would be the use of a Palmyrene equivalent, while the inscription of Vaballathus would be the direct translation. It cannot be certain that Odaenathus was a corrector.

- Imperator totius orientis (commander-in-chief of the entire East): only the Augustan History claims that Odaenathus was given this title; the same source also claims that he was made an Augustus, or co-emperor, following his defeat of the Persians. Both claims are dismissed by scholars. Odaenathus seems to have been acclaimed as imperator by his troops, which was a salutation usually reserved for the Roman emperor; this acclamation might explain the erroneous reports of the Augustan History.

Regardless of his titles, Odaenathus controlled the Roman East with the approval of Gallienus, who could do little but formalize Odaenathus' self-achieved status and settle for his formal loyalty. (Note: The Roman East traditionally included all the Roman lands in Asia east and south of the Bosphorus.) Odaenathus' authority extended from the Pontic coast in the north to Palestine in the south. This area included the Roman provinces of Syria, Phoenice, Palaestina, Arabia, Anatolia's eastern regions and, following the campaign of 262, Osroene and Mesopotamia.

==== First Persian campaign 262 ====
Perhaps driven by a desire to take revenge for the destruction of Palmyrene trade centers and to discourage Shapur I from initiating future attacks, Odaenathus launched an offensive against the Persians. The suppression of Fulvius Macrianus' rebellion probably prompted Gallienus to entrust the Palmyrene monarch with the war in Persia and Roman soldiers were in the ranks of Odaenathus' army for this campaign. In the spring of 262, the King marched north into the occupied Roman province of Mesopotamia, driving out the Persian garrisons and recapturing Edessa and Carrhae. The first onslaught was aimed at Nisibis, which Odaenathus regained but sacked, since the inhabitants had been sympathetic towards the Persian occupation. A little later he destroyed the Jewish city of Nehardea, 45 kilometres (28 mi) west of the Persian capital Ctesiphon, (Note: The tenth century geonim Sherira Gaon, in his work "Iggeret Rav Sherira Gaon", stated that Papa ben Nasor destroyed the city in 570 SE, corresponding to 259. de Blois proposed that Odaenathus' destruction of Nehardea in 259 was in support of Valerian. However, Neusner suggested that the correct date is 262 or 263, and considered the date given by Sherira Gaon impossible since the destruction of the city would have required a large army, and the only large force invading the region in that period was headed by Odaenathus during his first campaign. Feldman noted that Palmyra counted on the maneuverability of its soldiers not on the size of its armies, thus doubting the conclusions of Neusner.) as he considered the Jews of Mesopotamia to be loyal to Shapur I. By late 262 or early 263, Odaenathus stood outside the walls of the Persian capital.

The exact route taken by Odaenathus from Palmyra to Ctesiphon remains uncertain; it was probably similar to the route Emperor Julian took in 363 during his campaign against Persia. If he did use this route, Odaenathus would have crossed the Euphrates at Zeugma then moved east to Edessa followed by Carrhae then Nisibis. Here, he would have descended south along the Khabur River to the Euphrates valley and then marched along the river's left bank to Nehardea. He then penetrated the Sassanian province of Asōristān and marched along the royal canal Naarmalcha towards the Tigris, where the Persian capital stood.

Once at Ctesiphon, Odaenathus immediately began a siege of the well-fortified winter residence of the Persian kings; severe damage was inflicted upon the surrounding areas during several battles with Persian troops. The city held out and the logistical problems of fighting in enemy territory probably prompted the Palmyrenes to lift the siege. Odaenathus headed north along the Euphrates carrying with him numerous prisoners and much booty. The invasion resulted in the full restoration of the Roman lands which had been occupied by Shapur I since the beginning of his invasions in 252: Osroene and Mesopotamia. (Note: Contrary to the account of the Augustan History, there is no proof that Odaenathus occupied Armenia.) However, Dura-Europus and other Palmyrene posts south of Circesium, such as Anah, were not rebuilt. Odaenathus sent the captives to Rome, and by the end of 263 Gallienus assumed the title Persicus maximus ("the great victor in Persia") and held a triumph in Rome.

=== King of Kings of the East ===
In 263, after his return, Odaenathus assumed the title of King of Kings of the East (Mlk Mlk dy Mdnh), (Note: Odaenathus' title as it appears in Palmyrene inscriptions was "King of Kings and Corrector of the East".) and crowned his son Herodianus (Hairan I) as co-King of Kings. A statue was erected and dedicated for Herodianus to celebrate his coronation by Septimius Worod, the duumviri (magistrate) of Palmyra, and Julius Aurelius, the Queen's procurator (treasurer). The dedication, in Greek, is undated, but Septimius Worod was a duumviri between 263 and 264. Hence, the coronation took place c. 263. (Note: Gawlikowski proposed that the statue was erected and the coronation took place following the victory in 260. Gawlikowski also suggested that Odaenathus adopted the title "King of Kings" before his first Persian campaign in preparation for the war and the replacement of the Sassanid dynasty, a goal that was not achieved.) Contemporary evidence for Odaenathus bearing the title of King of Kings is lacking; all firmly dated inscriptions attesting Odaenathus with the title were commissioned after his death, including one that is dated to 271. However, Herodianus died with his father, and since he is directly attested as "King of Kings" during his father's lifetime, it is unimaginable that Odaenathus was simply a king while his son was the King of Kings. An undated inscription, written in Greek and difficult to decipher, found on a stone reused in the Palmyrene Camp of Diocletian, addresses Odaenathus as King of Kings (Rex regum) and was probably set during his reign.

According to the dedication, Herodianus was crowned near the Orontes, which indicates a ceremony taking place in Antioch on the Orontes, the metropolis of Syria. (Note: The archaeologist Daniel Schlumberger suggested Emesa (present-day Homs) as the location of the coronation, but the ancient city was located about a mile away from the river. Hence, the academic consensus prefers Antioch on the Orontes; a lead token bearing Herodianus image, probably struck to celebrate the coronation, was found in the city.) The title was a symbol of legitimacy in the East, dating back to the Assyrians, then the Achaemenids, who used it to symbolize their supremacy over all other rulers; it was later adopted by the Parthian monarchs to legitimize their conquests. The first Sassanian monarch, Ardashir I, adopted the title following his victory over the Parthians. Odaenathus' son was crowned with a diadem and a tiara; the choice of Antioch on the Orontes was probably meant to demonstrate that the Palmyrene monarchs were now the successors of the Seleucid and Iranian rulers who had controlled Syria and Mesopotamia in the past.

==== Relation with Rome ====
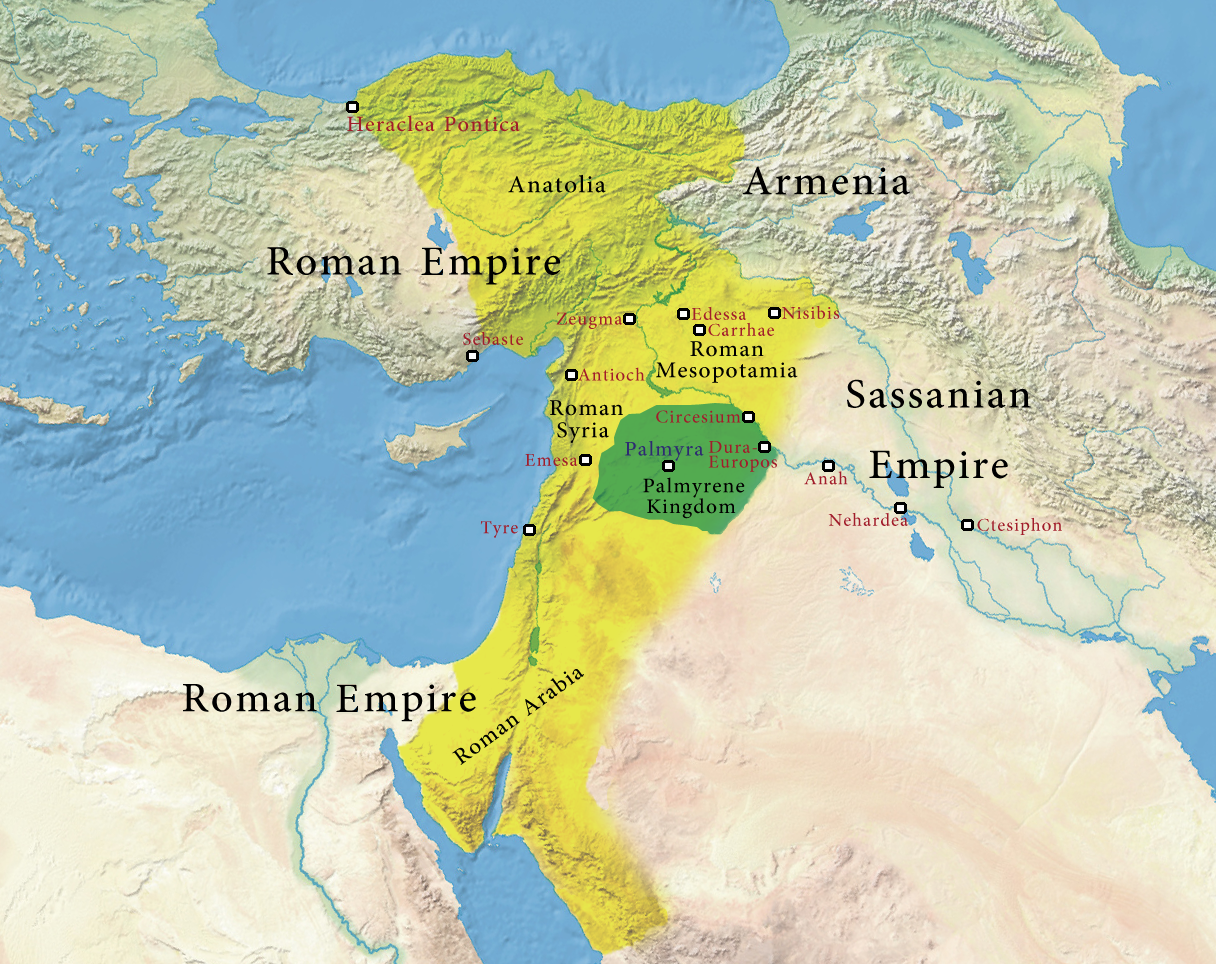
Roman regions under the authority of Odaenathus (yellow) and the Palmyrene kingdom (green)

In analyzing the rise of Odaenathus and his complicated relationship with Rome, the historian Gary K. Young concluded that "to search for any kind of regularity or normality in such a situation is clearly pointless". In practice, Palmyra became an allied kingdom of Rome, but legally, it remained part of the empire. The "King of Kings" title was probably not aimed at the position of the Roman emperor but at Shapur I; Odaenathus was declaring that he, not the Persian monarch, was the legitimate King of Kings of the East. Odaenathus' intentions are questioned by some historians, such as Drinkwater, who attributed the attempted negotiations with Shapur I to Odaenathus' quest for power. However, in contrast to the norm of this period when powerful generals frequently proclaimed themselves emperors, Odaenathus chose not to attempt to usurp Gallienus' throne.

The relationship between Odaenathus and the Emperor should be understood from two different perspectives: Roman and Syrian. In Rome, broad power delegation by the Emperor to an individual from outside the imperial family was not considered a problem; such authority had been granted several times since the days of Augustus in the first century. The Syrian perspective was different: according to Potter, the dedication celebrating Herodianus' coronation on the Orontes should be interpreted to mean a "Palmyrene claim to kingship in Syria" and control over it during the reign of Odaenathus. What the central government thought of such claims is unclear, but it is doubtful that Gallienus recognized the situation as the Palmyrenes understood it. In the Roman Empire's hierarchical system, a vassal king using the title of King of Kings did not indicate that he was a peer of the Emperor or that the ties of vassalage were cut. Such different understandings eventually led to the conflict between Rome and Palmyra during the reign of Zenobia, who considered her husband's Roman offices hereditary and an expression of independent authority. (Note: As queen consort, Zenobia remained in the background and was not mentioned in the historical record.)

The King had effective control over the Roman East where his military authority was absolute. Odaenathus respected Gallienus' authority to appoint provincial governors, but dealt swiftly with opposition: the Anonymus post Dionem, usually associated with the sixth-century historian Eustathius of Epiphania or Peter the Patrician, mentions the story of Kyrinus, or Quirinus, a Roman official, who showed dissatisfaction with Odaenathus' authority over the Persian frontier, and was immediately executed by the King. (Note: No information on the identity of Kyrinus exists; it is possible that he is the same person as Aurelius Quirinius, who is recorded as head of the financial administration of Egypt in 262.) In general, Odaenathus' actions were connected to his and Palmyra's interests only. His support of Gallienus and his Roman titles did not hide the Palmyrene base of his power and the local origin of his armies, as with his decision not to wait for the Emperor to help in 260. Odaenathus' status seems to have been, as Watson puts it, "something between powerful subject, independent vassal king and rival emperor".

==== Administration and royal image ====
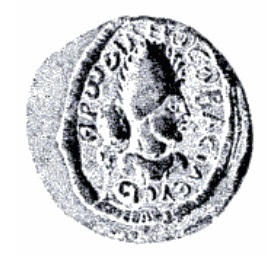
Herodianus wearing the Palmyrene crown

Odaenathus behaved as a sovereign monarch; outside his kingdom of Palmyra, he had overall administrative and military authority over the provincial governors of the Roman eastern provinces. Inside Palmyra, no Roman provincial official had any authority; the King filled the government with Palmyrenes. In parallel to the Iranian practice of making the government a family enterprise, Odaenathus bestowed his own gentilicium (Septimius) upon his leading generals and officials such as Zabdas, Zabbai and Worod. (Note: This gentilicium was exclusive to the family of Odaenathus prior to the 260s.) Most Palmyrene constitutional institutions continued to function normally during Odaenathus' reign; he maintained many civic establishments, but the last magistrates were elected in 264, and the Palmyrene council was not attested after that year. After this year, a governor, Septimius Worod, was appointed by the King for the city of Palmyra, who also functioned as a viceroy when Odaenathus was on campaign.

A lead token depicting Herodianus shows him wearing a tiara crown shaped like that of the Parthian monarchs, so it must have been Odaenathus' crown; this combination of imagery, together with the "King of Kings" title, indicates that Odaenathus considered himself the rival of the Sassanians and the protector of the region against them. Many intellectuals relocated to Palmyra and enjoyed the King's patronage; most prominently Cassius Longinus, who probably arrived in the 260s. It is possible that Odaenathus influenced local writers to promote his rule; a prophecy in the thirteenth Sibylline Oracle, written after the events it "prophesied", reads: "Then shall come one who was sent by the sun [i.e., Odaenathus], a mighty and fearful lion, breathing much flame. Then he with much shameless daring will destroy ... the greatest beast – venomous, fearful and emitting a great deal of hisses [i.e., Shapur I]". The authority of Odaenathus did not appease all factions in Syria and the glorification of the King in the oracle could be a politically sponsored propaganda aimed at expanding Odaenathus' support. (Note: The Thirteenth Sibylline Oracle was compiled by several writers who were probably Syrians and attempted to promote Syrian rulers by portraying them as the saviours of Rome from Persia. The initial text was completed during the time of Uranius and revised during the reign of Odaenathus with 19 lines added comprising the prophecy of Odaenathus' victories.) Another writer in the Palmyrene court, Nicostratus of Trebizond, probably accompanied the King on his campaigns and wrote a history of the period, starting with Philip the Arab and ending shortly before Odaenathus' death. According to Potter, Nicostratus' account was meant to glorify Odaenathus and demonstrate his superiority over the Roman Emperor.

===== Coinage =====
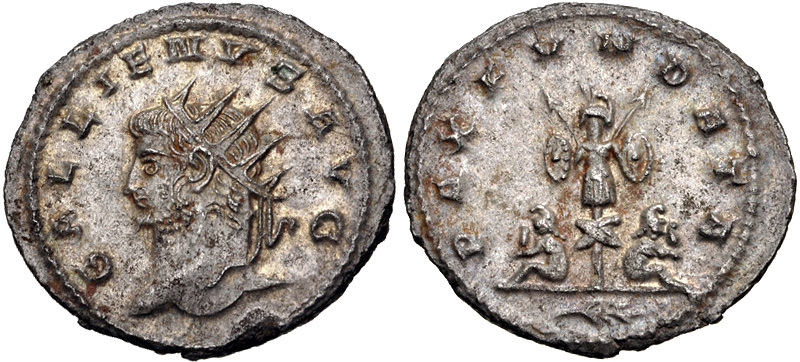
Antiochene coin of Gallienus c. 264–265, depicting captives on its reverse. It was possibly minted to celebrate Odaenathus' victories in Persia

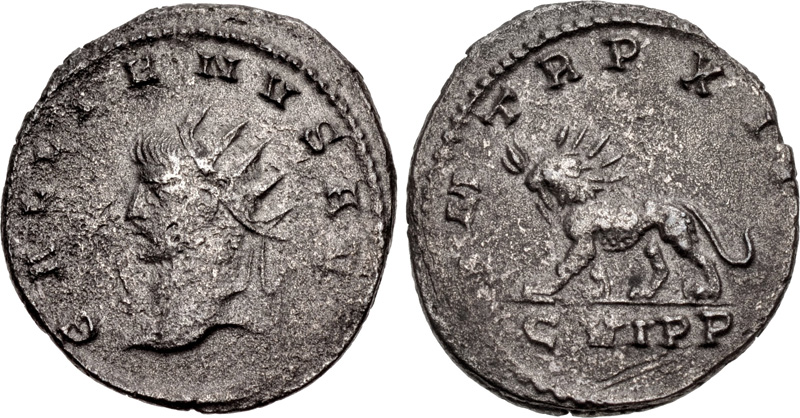
Antiochene coin of Gallienus 264–265, depicting a radiate lion on its reverse. The animal is probably a reference to Odaenathus who is described as a lion in the Thirteenth Sibylline Oracle

Odaenathus minted coinage only in the name of Gallienus, and produced no coins bearing his own image. The engraver Hubertus Goltzius forged coins of Odaenathus in the sixteenth century; according to the eighteenth-century numismatist Joseph Hilarius Eckhel "The coins of Odenathus are known only to Goltzius; and if anyone will put faith in their existence, let him go to the fountain head (i.e. Goltzius)". According to the Augustan History, Gallienus minted a coin in honour of Odaenathus where he was depicted taking the Persians captive; a coin of Gallienus minted in Antioch and dated to c. 264–265 depicts two seated captives on its reverse and was associated with the victories of Odaenathus by the historian Michael Geiger. Other coins of Gallienus depict lions on their reverses; the animal was portrayed in several fashions: bare headed with a bull's head between its paws; radiate head; radiate head with a bull's head between its paws; or an eagle standing on its back. The historian Erika Manders considered it possible that those coins were issued for Odaenathus, as the depiction of a lion is reminiscent of the thirteenth Sibylline Oracle's description of Odaenathus as a "mighty and fearful lion, breathing much flame". (Note: The historian David Woods rejected the different interpretations of the radiate lion, considering it a sign of the Emperor's brevity; a motif that can be traced back to Alexander the Great of Macedon's birth legends.)

==== Second Persian campaign 266 and war in Anatolia ====
The primary sources are silent regarding events following the first Persian campaign, but this is an indication of the peace that prevailed and that the Persians had ceased being a threat to the Roman East. The evidence for the second campaign is meager; Zosimus is the only one to mention it specifically. A passage in the thirteenth Sibylline Oracle is interpreted by Hartmann as an indication of a second offensive. With the rise of the Sassanid dynasty, Palmyrene trade caravans to the East diminished with only three recorded after 224. The last caravan returned to Palmyra in 266, and this was probably facilitated by the campaign, which probably took place in 266. The King marched directly to Ctesiphon, but he had to break off the siege and march north to face an influx of Germanic raiders attacking Anatolia.

The Romans used the designation "Scythian" to denote many tribes, regardless of their ethnic origin, and sometimes the term would be interchangeable with Goths. The tribes attacking Anatolia were probably the Heruli who built ships to cross the Black Sea in 267 and ravaged the coasts of Bithynia and Pontus, besieging Heraclea Pontica. According to the eighth-century historian George Syncellus, Odaenathus arrived at Anatolia with Herodianus and headed to Heraclea but the riders were already gone, having loaded their ships with booty. Many perished, perhaps in a sea battle with Odaenathus' forces, or possibly they were shipwrecked.

== Assassination ==
Odaenathus was assassinated, together with Herodianus, in late 267. The date is debated and some scholars propose 266 or 268, but Vaballathus dated the first year of his reign between August 267 and August 268, making late 267 the most probable date. The assassination took place in either Anatolia or Syria. There is no consensus on the manner, perpetrator or the motive behind the act.

- According to Syncellus, Odaenathus was assassinated near Heraclea Pontica by an assassin also named Odaenathus who was killed by the King's bodyguard.
- Zosimus states that Odaenathus was killed by conspirators near Emesa at a friend's birthday party without naming the killer. The twelfth-century historian Zonaras attributed the crime to a nephew of Odaenathus but did not give a name. The Anonymus post Dionem also does not name the assassin.
- The Augustan History claims that a cousin of the King named Maeonius killed him.

=== Theories of instigators and motives ===
- Roman conspiracy: the seventh-century historian John of Antioch accused Gallienus of being behind the assassination. A passage in the work of the Anonymus post Dionem speaks of a certain "Rufinus" who orchestrated the assassination on his own initiative, then explained his actions to the Emperor who condoned them. This account has Rufinus ordering the murder of an older Odaenathus out of fear that he would rebel, and has the younger Odaenathus complaining to the Emperor. (Note: This story contributed to the now-discounted assumption that Odaenathus I existed.) Since the older Odaenathus (Odaenathus I) has proven to be a fictional character, the story is ignored by most scholars. However, the younger Odaenathus could be an oblique reference to Vaballathus and Rufinus could be identified with Cocceius Rufinus, the Roman governor of Arabia in 261–262. The evidence for such a Roman conspiracy is weak.

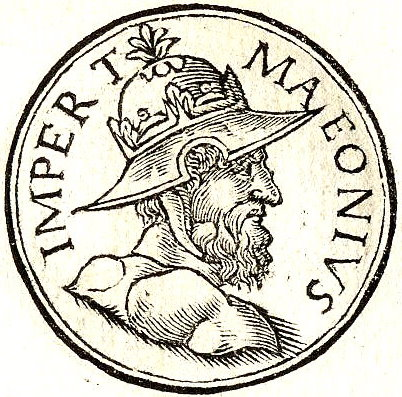
Maeonius as depicted in the Promptuarii Iconum Insigniorum

- Family feud: according to Zonaras, Odaenathus' nephew misbehaved during a lion hunt. He made the first attack and killed the animal to the dismay of the King. Odaenathus warned his nephew, who ignored the warning and repeated the act twice more, causing the King to deprive him of his horse, a great insult in the East. The nephew threatened Odaenathus and was put in chains as a result. Herodianus asked his father to forgive his cousin and his request was granted. However, as the King was drinking, the nephew approached him with a sword and killed him along with Herodianus. The bodyguard immediately executed the nephew.
- Zenobia: the wife of Odaenathus was accused by the Augustan History of having formerly conspired with Maeonius, as Herodianus was her stepson and she could not accept that he was the heir to her husband instead of her own children. However, there is no suggestion in the Augustan History that Zenobia was directly involved in her husband's murder; the act is attributed to Maeonius' degeneracy and jealousy. Those accounts by the Augustan History can be dismissed as fiction. The hints in modern scholarship that Zenobia had a hand in the assassination out of her desire to rule the empire and her dismay at her husband's pro-Roman policy can be dismissed as there was no reversal of that policy during the first years following Odaenathus' death.
- Persian agents: the possibility of a Persian involvement exists, but the outcome of the assassination would not have served Shapur I unless a pro-Persian monarch was established on the Palmyrene throne.
- Palmyrene traitors: another possibility would be Palmyrenes dissatisfied with Odaenathus' reign and the changes of their city's governmental system.

The historian Nathanael Andrade, noting that since the Augustan History, Zosimus, Zonaras, and Syncellus all refer to a family feud or a domestic conspiracy in their writings, they must have been recounting an early tradition regarding the assassination. Also, the story of Rufinus is a clue to tensions between Odaenathus and the Roman court. The mint of Antioch on the Orontes ceased the production of Gallienus' coins in early 268, and while this could be related to fiscal troubles, it could also have been ordered by Zenobia in retaliation for the murder of her husband. Andrade proposed that the assassination was the result of a coup conducted by Palmyrene notables in collaboration with the imperial court whose officials were dissatisfied with Odaenathus' autonomy. On the other hand, Hartmann concluded that it is more probable that Odaenathus was killed in Pontus.

== Marriages and descendants ==
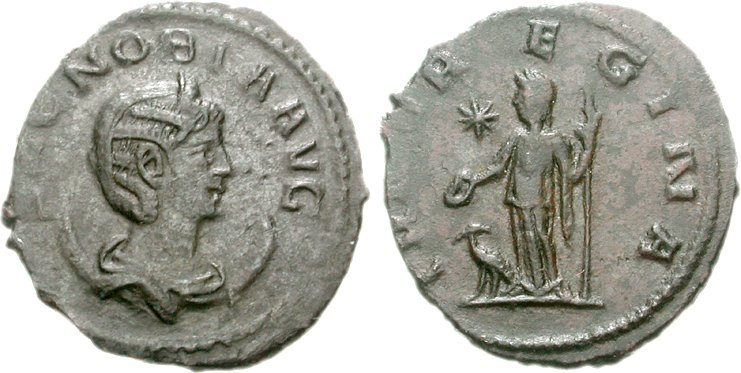
Zenobia, Odaenathus' second wife

Odaenathus was married twice. Nothing is known about his first wife's name or fate. Zenobia was the King's second wife, whom he married in the late 250s when she was 17 or 18.

How many children Odaenathus had with his first wife is unknown and only one is attested:

- Hairan I – Herodianus: the name Hairan appears on a 251 inscription from Palmyra describing him as ras, implying that he was already an adult by then. In the Augustan History, Odaenathus' eldest son is named Herod; the dedication at Palmyra from 263 which celebrates Hairan I's coronation mentions him with the name Herodianus. It is possible that the Hairan of the 251 inscription is not the same as the Herodianus of the dedication from 263, but this is contested by Hartmann, who concludes that the reason for the difference in the spelling is the language used in the inscription (Herodianus being the Greek version), meaning that Odaenathus' eldest son and co-king was Hairan Herodianus. Hartmann's view is in line with the academic consensus.

The children of Odaenathus and Zenobia were:

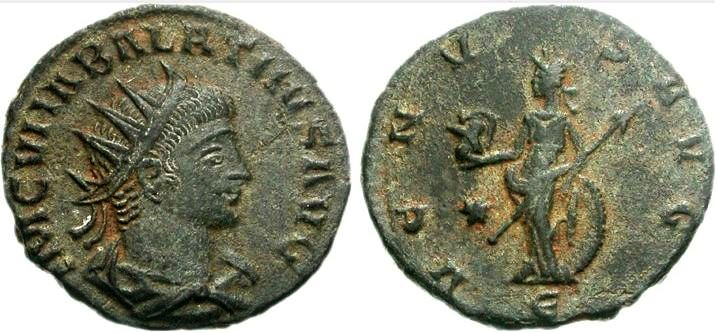
Vaballathus, Odaenathus' son and successor

- Vaballathus: he is attested on several coins, inscriptions, and in the ancient literature.
- Hairan II: his image appears on a seal impression along with his older brother Vaballathus; his identity is much debated. Potter suggested that he is the same as Herodianus, who was crowned in 263, and that the Hairan I mentioned in 251 died before the birth of Hairan II. Andrade suggested the opposite, maintaining that Hairan I, Herodianus and Hairan II are the same.
- Herennianus and Timolaus: the two were mentioned in the Augustan History and are not attested in any other source; Herennianus might be a conflation of Hairan and Herodianus while Timolaus is most probably a fabrication, although the historian Dietmar Kienast suggests that he might be Vaballathus.

Possible descendants of Odaenathus living in later centuries are reported: Lucia Septimia Patabiniana Balbilla Tyria Nepotilla Odaenathiana is known through a dedication dating to the late third or early fourth century inscribed on a tombstone erected by a wet nurse to her "sweetest and most loving mistress". (Note: It is debated whether the inscription should be understood as an evidence for descendants of Odaenathus in Rome.) The tombstone was found in Rome at the San Callisto in Trastevere. Another possible relative is Eusebius who is mentioned by the fourth century rhetorician Libanius in 391 as a son of one Odaenathus, who was in turn a descendant of the King; the father of Eusebius is mentioned as fighting against the Persians (most probably in the ranks of Emperor Julian's army). In 393, Libanius mentioned that Eusebius promised him a speech written by Longinus for the King. In the fifth century, the philosopher "Syrian Odaenathus" lived in Athens and was a student of Plutarch of Athens; he might have been a distant descendant of the King.

== Burial and succession ==
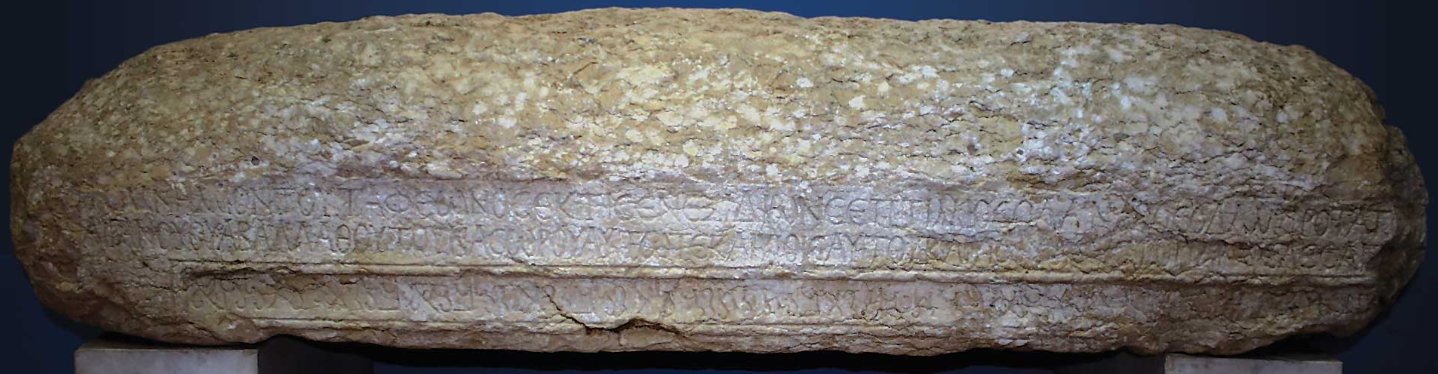
The stone block from Odaenathus' early tomb

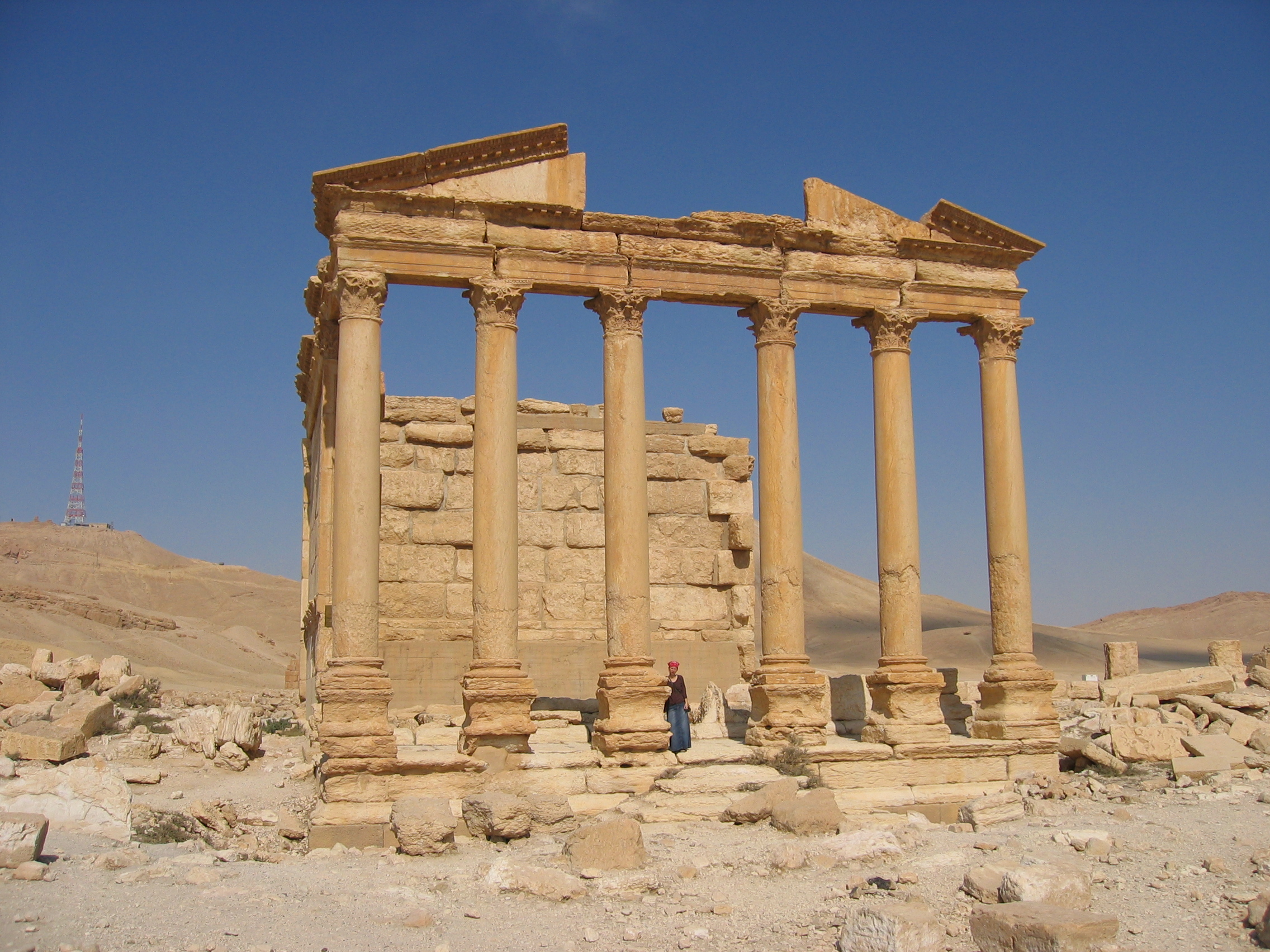
The Funerary Temple no. 86 (The House Tomb)

Mummification was practiced in Palmyra alongside inhumation and it is a possibility that Zenobia had her husband mummified. The stone block bearing Odaenathus' sepulchral inscription was in the Temple of Bel in the nineteenth century, and it was originally the architrave of the tomb. It had been moved to the temple at some point and so the location of the tomb to which the block belonged is not known. The tomb was probably built early in Odaenathus' career and before his marriage to Zenobia and it is plausible that another, more elaborate, tomb was built after Odaenathus became King of Kings.

Roman law forbade the burial of individuals within a city. This rule was strictly observed in the west, but it was applied more leniently in the eastern parts of the empire. A burial within a city was one of the highest honors an individual other than the Emperor and his family could receive in the Roman Empire. A notable person may be buried in this manner for different reasons, such as his leadership or monetary donations. It meant that the deceased was not sent beyond the walls for fear of miasma (pollution), and that he would be part of the city's future civic life. (Note: Generally, the initiative of granting an individual an intramural burial came from the demos and had to be confirmed through acclamatio; due to this requirement, the honor was a rarity.) At the western end of the Great Colonnade at Palmyra, a shrine designated "Funerary Temple no. 86" (also known as the House Tomb) is located. Inside its chamber, steps lead down to a vault crypt which is now lost. This mausoleum might have belonged to the royal family, being the only tomb inside the city's walls. Odaenathus' royal power in itself was sufficient to earn him a burial within the city walls.

The Augustan History claims that Maeonius was proclaimed emperor for a brief period before being killed by soldiers. However, no inscriptions or other evidence exist for Maeonius' reign, the very existence of which is doubtful. The disappearance of Septimius Worod in 267 could be related to the internal coup; he could have been executed by Zenobia if he was involved; or killed by the conspirators if he was loyal to the King. Odaenathus was succeeded by his son, the ten-year-old Vaballathus, under the regency of Zenobia; Hairan II probably died soon after his father, as only Vaballathus succeeded to the throne.

== Legacy and reception ==
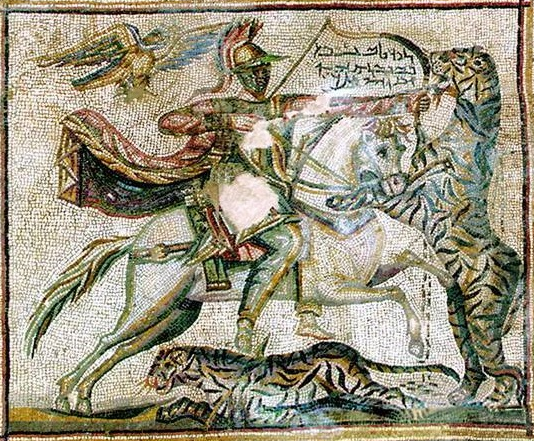
The mosaic possibly depicting Odaenathus fighting the Persians who are depicted as tigers.

Odaenathus was the founder of the Palmyrene royal dynasty. He left Palmyra the premier power in the East, and his actions laid the foundation of Palmyrene strength which culminated in the establishment of the Palmyrene Empire in 270. Hero cults were not common in Palmyra, but the unprecedented position and achievements of Odaenathus might have given rise to such a practice: a mosaic excavated in Palmyra depicts the Greek myth of Bellerophon defeating the Chimera on the back of Pegasus in one panel, and a man in Palmyrene military outfit riding a horse and shooting at two tigers, with an eagle flying above in the other. According to Gianluca Serra, the conservation zoologist based in Palmyra at the time of the panel's discovery, the tigers are Panthera tigris virgata, once common in the region of Hyrcania in Iran. Gawlikowski proposed that Odaenathus is heroized as Bellerophon, and that the archer is also a depiction of Odaenathus fighting the Persians depicted as tigers. This is supported by the title of mrn (lord) which appear on the archer panel, an honor carried only by Odaenathus and Hairan I. The mosaic with its two panels indicates that Odaenathus was probably treated as a divine figure, and may have been worshipped in Palmyra.

Odaenathus' memory as an able king, and loyal Roman, was used by the emperors Claudius II and Aurelian to tarnish Zenobia's reputation by portraying themselves as Odaenathus' avengers against his wife, the usurper who gained the throne through plotting. The King was praised by Libanius, and the fourth-century writer of the Augustan History, while placing Odaenathus among the Thirty Tyrants (probably because he assumed the title of king, in the view of the eighteenth-century historian Edward Gibbon), speaks highly of his role in the Persian War and credits him with saving the empire: "Had not Odaenathus, prince of the Palmyrenes, seized the imperial power after the capture of Valerian when the strength of the Roman state was exhausted, all would have been lost in the East". On the other hand, Odaenathus is viewed negatively in Rabbinic sources. His sack of Nehardea mortified the Jews, and he was cursed by both the Babylonian Jews and the Jews of Palestine. In the Christian version of the Apocalypse of Elijah, probably written in Egypt following the capture of Valerian, Odaenathus is called the king who will rise from the "city of the sun" and will eventually be killed by the Persians; this prophecy is a response to Odaenathus' persecution of the Jews and his destruction of Nahardea. The Jewish Apocalypse of Elijah identifies Odaenathus as the Antichrist. (Note: The Apocalypse of Elijah is an apocryphal work that exists in two versions, one is Jewish and written in Hebrew, and the other is Christian and written in Coptic. The Christian version seems to be based on a Jewish prophecy written in Egypt in the time of the turmoil after Valerian's capture; the Jews were probably expecting the Persians to win and allow them to return to Jerusalem by eliminating Odaenathus, whom they considered an enemy. According to the prophecy: "In those days, a king will arise in the city which is called "the city of the sun," and the whole land will be disturbed. [He will] flee to Memphis (with the Persians). In the sixth year, the Persian kings will plot an ambush in Memphis. They will kill the Assyrian king." The Coptologist Oscar Lemm considered that by the Persian and Assyrian kings, the prophecy meant the sixth-century BC kings Cyrus the Great of Persia and the Chaldean Nebuchadnezzar II of Babylonia. Lemm also considered the killing of the Assyrian king in Memphis an allusion to the defeat of the Babylonians by Persia. The theologian Wilhelm Bousset considered the prophecy to be pointless if it actually meant that the Persians and Assyrian kings warred in Egypt since such a conflict never happened. Noting the confusion between Syria and Assyria in many Roman sources, including the Sibylline prophecies, Bousset identified the Assyrian king with Odaenathus; Palmyra was known as the city of the sun in many apocalyptic traditions.)

=== Modern skepticism ===
Odaenathus, the mention of whose name alone caused the hearts of the Persians to falter. Everywhere victorious, he liberated the cities and the territories belonging to each of them and made the enemies place their salvation in their prayers rather than in the force of arms.

— Libanius, on the exploits of Odaenathus.

The successes of Odaenathus are treated skeptically by a number of modern scholars. According to the Augustan History, Odaenathus "captured the king's treasures and he captured, too, what the Parthian monarchs hold dearer than treasures, namely his concubines. For this reason Shapur [I] was now in greater dread of the Roman generals, and out of fear of Ballista and Odaenathus he withdrew more speedily to his kingdom." Skeptical scholars, such as Martin Sprengling, considered such accounts of ancient Roman historians "poor, scanty and confused". However, the coronation dedication of Herodianus' statue, which stood on the Monumental Arch of Palmyra, records his defeat of the Persians, for which he was crowned, thus providing Palmyrene evidence that explicitly mentions the war against Persia; the victory attested is probably related to the first Persian campaign and not the battle of 260.

The historian Andreas Alföldi concluded that Odaenathus started his wars with Persia by attacking the retreating Persian army at Edessa in 260. Such an attack is rejected by skeptical scholars; Sprengling noted that no evidence exists for such an engagement. The Iranologist Walter Bruno Henning considered the accounts of Odaenathus' attack in 260 greatly exaggerated. Shapur I mentions that he made the Roman prisoners build him the Band-e Kaisar near Susiana, and built a city for those prisoners, which evolved into the current Gundeshapur; Henning cited those arguments as evidence for Shapur I's success in bringing his army and prisoners back home and Roman exaggeration regarding Odaenathus' successes. Sprengling suggested that Shapur I did not have enough troops to garrison the Roman cities he occupied, and he was old and focused on religion and building; hence, Odaenathus merely retook abandoned cities and marched on Ctesiphon to heal Rome's pride, while being careful not to disturb the Persians and their emperor. Other scholars, such as Jacob Neusner, noted that while the accounts of the 260 engagement might be an exaggeration, Odaenathus did become a real threat to Persia when he regained the cities formerly taken by Shapur I and besieged Ctesiphon. The historian Louis Feldman rejected Henning's proposals; and the historian Trevor Bryce concluded that whatever the nature of Odaenathus' campaigns, they led to the restoration of all Roman territories occupied by Shapur I – Rome was free of Persian threats for several years after Odaenathus' wars.

== Notes ==
Odaenathus House of Odaenathus Born: 220 Died: 267
Regnal titles
Preceded by New title	Ras of Palmyra; 240s–260 with Hairan I (Herodianus) (?–260)	Title obsolete Became king
Preceded by New title	King of Palmyra; 260–267	Succeeded by Vaballathus
Preceded by New title	King of Kings of the East; 263–267 with Herodianus as junior King of Kings (263–267)	Succeeded by Vaballathus
