= Balista =

Roman praetorian prefect and usurper (died c.261)

Balista or Ballista (died c. 261), also known in the sources with the name of "Callistus", was one of the Thirty Tyrants of the controversial Historia Augusta, and supported the rebellion of the Macriani against Emperor Gallienus.

== History ==
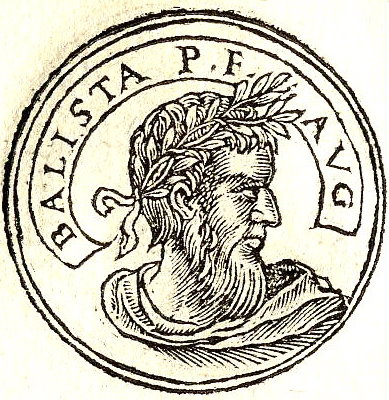
Balista from Promptuarii Iconum Insigniorum

Balista was the praetorian prefect under Valerian. After the Sasanian Empire defeated and captured that emperor in the Battle of Edessa, Balista, along with Macrianus, harassed the Sasanian army, even capturing Shapur’s treasure and harem. Joined, in some accounts, by Odaenathus, the Lord of Palmyra, they routed the Sasanian army that was returning from the ravaging of Cilicia. Then Macrianus proclaimed his sons, Macrianus Minor and Quietus, as emperors.

He stayed with Quietus in the East, while Macrianus and his elder son moved with the army against the West. In the Balkans, both Macriani were routed by the commander of Roman cavalry, Aureolus, a general loyal to Gallienus, and killed. Then, according to some accounts, Gallienus invited Odaenathus to turn against his former allies, Ballista and Quietus. Neither the time nor manner of Balista's death can be ascertained with certainty, but it is believed to have happened about November 261, and to have been contrived by Odaenathus. Another suggestion is that they were killed by their own men at Emesa.

== In popular culture ==
Balista, under the name Marcus Clodius Ballista is the hero of the Warrior of Rome Series by Harry Sidebottom.

== Sources ==
- Bray, John (1997). Gallienus : A Study in Reformist and Sexual Politics. Kent Town: Wakefield Press. ISBN 1-86254-337-2
- Körner, Christian, "Usurpers in the east: The Macriani and Ballista", s.v. "Usurpers under Gallienus", De Imperatoribus Romanis
- Potter, David S. (2004). The Roman Empire at Bay AD 180–395. Routledge. ISBN 0-415-10058-5
- Watson, Alaric (2003). Aurelian and the Third Century. Routledge.
