= Aureolus =

Usurper of the Roman Empire (died 268)

- Usurper of the Roman Empire
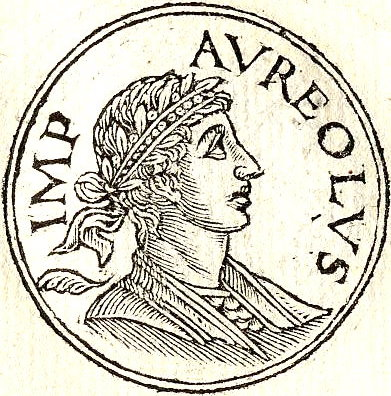
- Aureolus from Promptuarii Iconum Insigniorum
- Reign: 268 (against Gallienus)
- Born: 220–230(?); Dacia
- Died: 268; Mediolanum, Italy

Aureolus (c.225 – 268) was a Roman military commander during the reign of Emperor Gallienus before he attempted to usurp the Roman Empire. After turning against Gallienus, Aureolus was killed during the political turmoil that surrounded the Emperor's assassination in a conspiracy orchestrated by his senior officers. Aureolus is known as one of the Thirty Tyrants and is referenced in ancient sources including the Historia Augusta, Zonaras' epitome and Zosimus' Historia Nova.

== Biography ==
=== Early life ===
Aureolus was born in the Roman province of Dacia, north of the Danube, and prior to his military career served as a herdsman as well as Master of the Imperial Horses ('Phronistes'). His nomen is often reported as Acilius, while his praenomen is thought to be either Marcus or Manius, both of which were common praenomina within the Acilia gens. Although some historians such as John Platts, William A'Beckett and Angelo Paredi have thought the 'M' to stand for a second nomen Manlius.

It is unclear whether Aurelous came to the attention of the Emperor Gallienus after enlisting in the army, or during his service as a groom. Gallienus was known to promote talent from outside the establishment, and Aureolus was one of the New Men who replaced senators in positions of high command in the army in the course of his reign.

=== Career ===
As a former Imperial Horsemaster, Aureolus developed a self-contained cavalry force to increase the effectiveness of the comitatus as a highly mobile field army under the Emperor's direct control. Aureolus was the first commander of this force under the Emperor, and was based at Mediolanum (Milan).

Aureolus' cavalry was principally responsible for the defeat of the usurper Ingenuus at the Battle of Mursa (Osijek) in 258. In 261, he commanded the force which defeated the army of the usurpers Macrianus Major and Macrianus Minor in battle somewhere in the central Balkans. The army of the Macriani, which first supported usurper Ingenuus and then Regalianus, included inmates from garrisons in Danubian provinces and was estimated to be at least 30,000 strong.

The success of Aureolus in suppressing the Macriani is thought by some historians to have undermined the achievements of Gallienus. Other historians suggest that at this time Gallienus was attempting to crush the Gallic usurper Postumus, who murdered Gallienus's son Caesar Saloninus, and clear the Juthungi out of the Alpine province of Raetia where they posed a direct threat to Italy and Rome.

=== Rebellion ===
After the Macriani were defeated and the Danubian garrison forces who had supported them were pacified, Aureolus and the Emperor united to defeat Postumus and his Gallic Empire. It may have been as a result of this campaign that the province of Raetia was recovered from the Gallic Empire and Postumus's inscription on the Augsburg Altar was erased. However, Postumus managed to evade complete defeat, which some historians blame on the alleged 'carelessness' of Aureolus. Other historians have suggested that Aureolus deliberately allowed the Gallic usurper to evade destruction to see Gallienus displaced as Emperor.

Zosimus reported that Aureolus and two other officers conspired against Gallienus, but that all of them were punished and submitted, except Aureolus, who retained his anger against the emperor. The reasons for this are unknown, though it is speculated that as a Dacian Aureolus resented Gallienus for using the Dacian garrison to reinforce his field army for the defence of Italy, compounding the problems of barbarian incursions into Dacia. Despite his failure to destroy Postumus in Gaul, Aureolus was given sole responsibility for the campaign against the Macriani. However, when the Goths and Heruls invaded the Danubian provinces with an enormous force in 268, Aureolus was not even a senior officer of the Imperial comitatus that accompanied the Emperor against the marauders. He was instead made commander of the Raetian garrison while his cavalry went east with the Emperor under the command of Claudius (later the Emperor Claudius Gothicus) or Aurelian, who also became Emperor in due course.

Losing command of the elite cavalry is thought to have been a humiliating demotion for Aureolus, who deserted his Alpine command and invaded Italy and took his old base at Mediolanum. This treason caused Gallienus to break off his campaign against the Goths in the Balkans at a most critical moment to return to Italy to deal with Aureolus. Historians believe the longer-term consequences of Aureolus' rebellion opened Raetia to further invasion by the Alamanni who then went on to raid Italy itself in the early months of the reign of Claudius Gothicus. It may have been at this time that the Agri Decumates, the Roman lands north-east of the upper Rhine, were lost to the Empire.

From Mediolanum, Aureolus invited Postumus to challenge Gallienus for the Empire with his support. Using the Imperial mint in Mediolanum, Aureolus had coins struck bearing Postumus's image as Emperor with appeals to the faith of his former comrades of the cavalry on the reverse. Postumus ignored his invitation and Aureolus, unsupported by the Gallic usurper, was defeated by Gallienus in a battle on the river Adda east of Milan at a place known for centuries as Pontirolo (from Latin Pons Aureoli i.e. 'The Bridge of Aureolus'). He was then besieged in Mediolanum by Gallienus' military comitatus, including the cavalry which Aureolus had created.

=== Death ===
Following the conspiracy by the Praetorian Prefect, together with Aurelius Heraclianus, Claudius and Aurelian which saw Gallienus murdered, Aureolus as one of the Thirty Tyrants is thought to have attempted to take power himself.

Aureolus surrendered to Claudius Gothicus, who succeeded Gallienus as Emperor. Before Claudius could decide his sentence, Aureolus was murdered by Claudius' Praetorian Guard as revenge for his rebellion against Gallienus.
