= Macrianus Major =

Usurper of the Roman Empire (died 261)

Macrianus
- Usurper of the Roman Empire
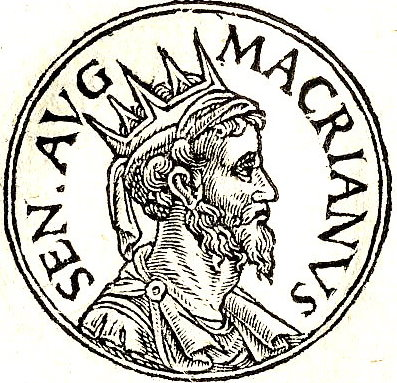
- Macrianus Major from Promptuarii Iconum Insigniorum
- Reign: 259 or 260 to 261
- Predecessor: Gallienus
- Successor: Macrianus Minor, Quietus
- Died: 261; Thrace
- Wife: unknown
- Issue: Macrianus Minor, Quietus
Names
- Fulvius Macrianus

Fulvius Macrianus (d. 261), also called Macrianus Major, was a Roman usurper. He was one of Valerian's fiscal officers. More precisely, sources refer to him as being in charge of the whole state accounts (A rationibus) or, in the language of a later age, as Count of the Treasury (Comes Sacrarum Largitionum) and the person in charge of markets and provisions. It seems almost certain that he was an Equestrian. The Historia Augusta claims that he was the foremost of Valerian's military commanders, but that is most likely a gross exaggeration, if not entirely fictitious. He followed Valerian during his ultimately catastrophic campaign against the Persians in 259 or 260; however, he remained at Samosata during the fatal battle of Edessa and his role in the events before and after the battle is questionable. After Valerian's capture by Sassanid Emperor Shapur I, Valerian's son Gallienus became sole emperor, but was occupied with his own problems in the West. Macrianus grabbed the opportunity. With the support of Balista, one of Valerian's military commanders, and with the influence that possession of the treasury of Valerian brought, Macrianus managed to have his two sons Macrianus Minor and Quietus elevated to the throne. He himself was not able to assume the purple because he was deformed in one of his legs.

Quietus and Balista stayed in the East to secure their rule. Macrianus Major and Minor marched the eastern army from Asia to Europe, but were defeated in Thrace in 261 by Aureolus. Macrianus and his son were killed in the battle. According to Joannes Zonaras, their army was encircled by Aureolus and surrendered, except for the Pannonian legions. Macrianus asked to be killed with his son to avoid delivery to Aureolus. Quietus was later murdered by Odaenathus of Palmyra.
