= Muddy hoard =

Roman coin hoard from 274 found in England in 2018

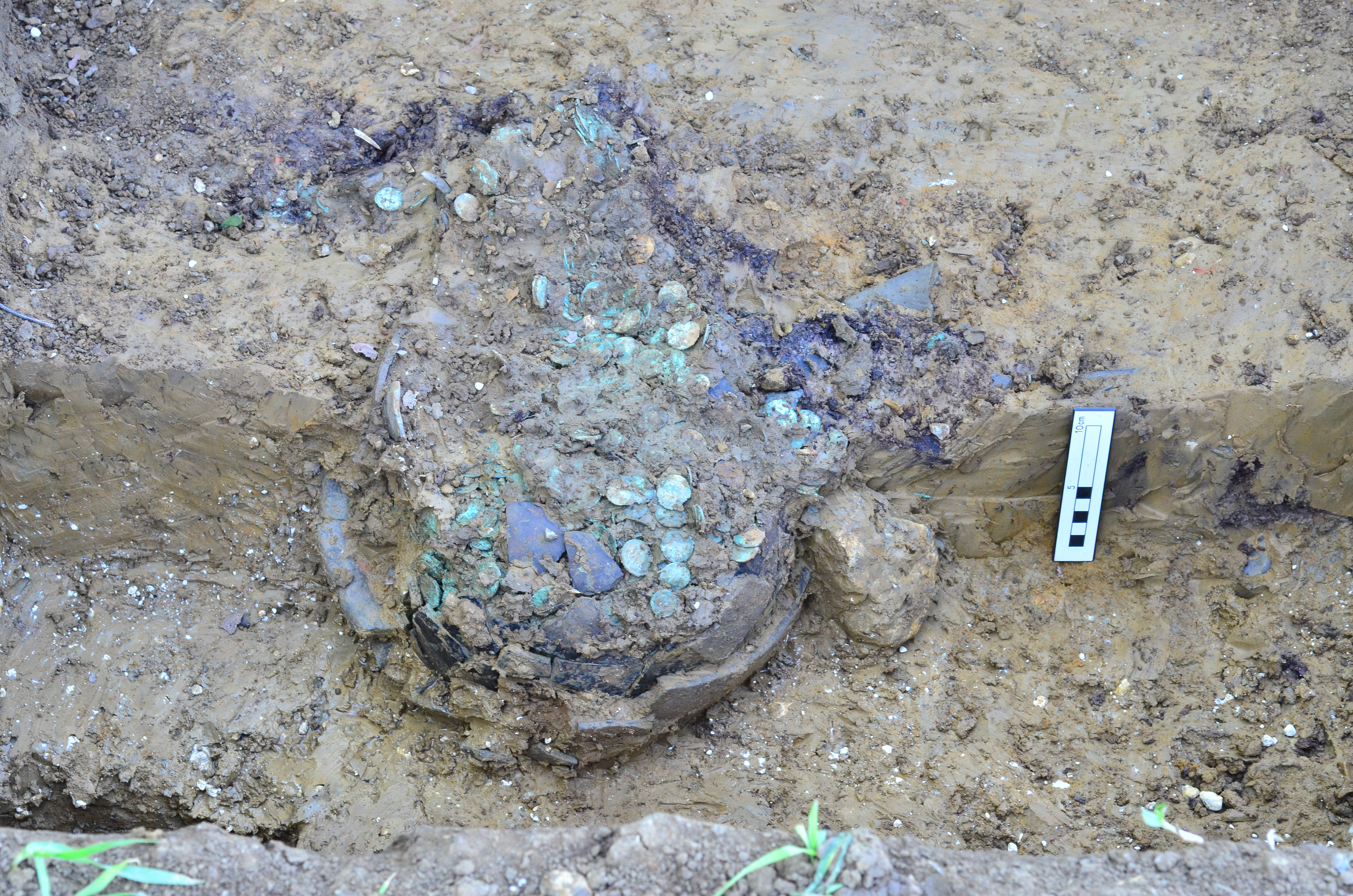
- The Hoard in Situ, 2018
- Material: Roman Coins, Roman Pottery
- Size: Pottery shards, 9724 Roman Coins
- Created: 274
- Discovered: Monday 30th April 2018 - Tuesday 15th May 2018; Huntingdon, Cambridgeshire, England
- Place: British Museum; Norris Museum, St. Ives
- Classification: Treasure
- Identification: CAM-A0ECFB
- Culture: Romano-British

The Muddy Hoard is a Roman British coin hoard found in Huntingdon, Cambridgeshire, dating to approximately the year 274, during the joint reign of Tetricus I, and his son, Tetricus II of the Gallic Empire, a breakaway state of the Roman Empire during the reign of Aurelian.

It is considered by far the largest coin hoard in Cambridgeshire County, England.

Declared "Treasure" under the Coroner's Inquest on November 11, 2021, it is exhibited at the Norris Museum in St Ives, Cambridgeshire from September 16, 2023, temporarily for six months, until the museum acquires enough funding for its permanent acquisition.

== Discovery ==
On April 30, 2018, a metal detectorist in the town of Huntingdon, was searching on private land under the permission of the landowner, where he unearthed a copper-alloy coin. After a few more coins emerged from the ground, the detectorist covered up the find to report it under the Portable Antiquities Scheme, whereupon the find liaison officer of Cambridgeshire, Helen Fowler, and Dr. Andrew Brown of the British Museum conducted a two-day excavation of the hoard.

Under the PAS, it is designated CAM-A0ECFB under Treasure Tracking Number 2018T317.

== Description ==
The hoard is considered partially disturbed, and was initially discovered scattered out.

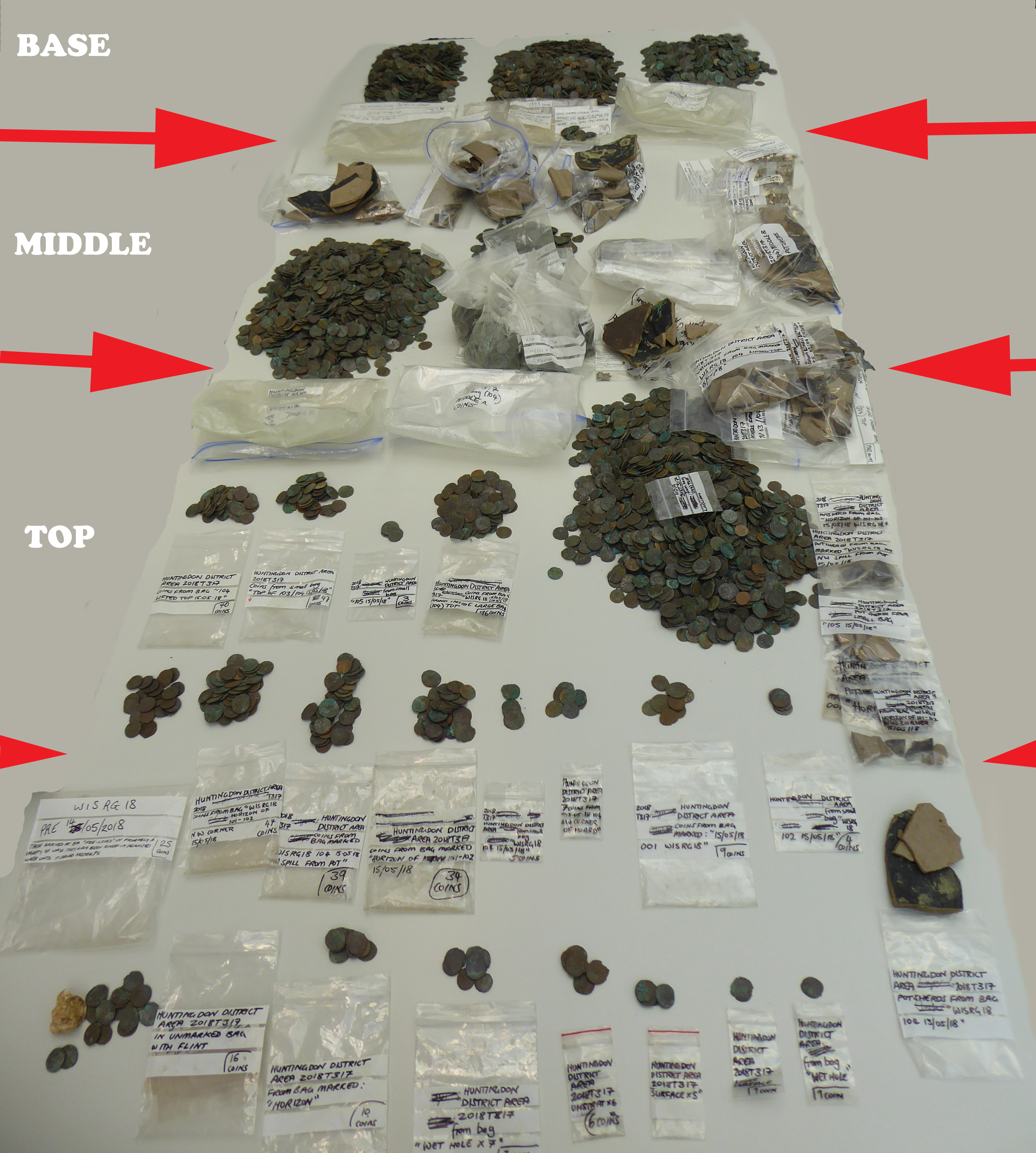
The hoard sorted by it contents at the British Museum in August 2019.

It is composed of two ceramic vessels, one inside another, nestled like matryoshka dolls. The outer vessel was a coarse, grey ware vessel, the inner pot made of dark gray, finer clay. It was determined that with the weight of the coins that the inner pot cracked, requiring the addition of the outer pot to contain rest of the stash. The hoard itself was otherwise mostly intact, with no indicating archaeological features surrounding the land.

After separation of the coins at the British Museum, it was determined to be made of 9724 Roman coins, a mixture of Antoninianii, Barbarous radiates, and 3 denarii, including an unrecorded denarius variant of Tetricus I.

The hoard has a high proportion of radiates, which were made during the short supply of official coinage and turbulence of the Gallic Empire, a result of the Crisis of the Third Century. By the time the hoard was buried, Tetricus I surrendered to Aurelian, who then reunited the Roman Empire.

The hoard contains the coinage portraiture of 14 Emperors and 1 Empress.

Table of Coins
Portrait	Date	Number of Coins	Empire
Volusianus	251-3	1	Central
Valerian (emperor)	253-60	8	Central
Valerian/Gallienus (joint reign)	253-60	4	Central
Salonina (joint)	253-60	18	Central
Saloninus	258-60	1	Central
Divus Valerian II		3	Central
Gallienus	260-8	859 + 2 denarii	Central
Salonina	260-8	76	Central
Claudius II	268-70	766	Central
Divus Claudius II		132	Central
Quintillus	270	72	Central
Aurelian	270-5	8 (pre-reform)	Central
Unknown		6	Central
Postumus	260-9	107	Gallic
Laelian	269	5	Gallic
Marcus Aurelius Marius	269	17	Gallic
Victorinus	269-71	1817	Gallic
Divus Victorinus		4	Gallic
Tetricus I	271-4	2981 + 1 denarius	Gallic
Tetricus II	271-4	1281	Gallic
Irregular Radiates		998	
Unknown Emperors (Fragments)		6	
