= Crisis of the Third Century =

Roman government crisis (235–285)

- The divided Empire in 271 AD Gallic Empire Roman Empire Palmyrene Empire
Date	235–285 AD (50 years) (Note: Most scholars mark the end of the crisis with the accession of Diocletian (20 November 284), who was proclaimed emperor following the death of Numerian, although the empire was not fully reunified until Carinus' defeat in July 285.)
Location	Roman Empire
Result	Roman victory; Emperor Aurelian conquers both the Palmyrene and Gallic Empires; Emperor Diocletian puts an end to the civil war; Start of the Diocletianic Persecution; Beginning of the Tetrarchy
Territorial changes	Temporary loss of the Palmyrene and Gallic Empires, which were later reunified into the Roman Empire; Loss of parts of the Agri Decumates; Dacia abandoned

Belligerents
Roman Empire (Note: Adriatic-Ionian-centered)	Roman breakaways: Gallic Empire; Palmyrene Empire	Germanic tribes: Alemanni; Carpians; Franks; Goths; Vandals; Sasanian Empire

Commanders and leaders
Gallienus X; Claudius II #; Aurelian X; Diocletian	Postumus X; Marius X; Victorinus X; Tetricus I (surrendered); Odaenathus X; Vaballathus (surrendered); Zenobia (surrendered); Antiochus (surrendered)	Cniva † Shapur I

The Crisis of the Third Century, also known as the Military Anarchy or the Imperial Crisis, was a period in Roman history during which the Roman Empire nearly collapsed under the combined pressure of repeated foreign invasions, civil wars and economic disintegration. At the height of the crisis, the Roman state split into three distinct and competing polities. The period is usually dated between the death of Severus Alexander (235) and accession of Diocletian (284). The crisis resulted in such profound changes that it marks the transition between the historical periods of classical antiquity and late antiquity.

The crisis began in 235 with the assassination of Emperor Severus Alexander by his own troops. During the following years, the empire saw barbarian invasions and migrations into Roman territory, civil wars, peasant rebellions and political instability, with multiple usurpers competing for power. This led to the debasement of currency and a breakdown in both trade networks and economic productivity, with the Plague of Cyprian contributing to the disorder. Roman armies became more reliant over time on the growing influence of the barbarian mercenaries known as foederati. Roman commanders in the field, although nominally loyal to the state, became increasingly independent of Rome's central authority.

During the crisis, there were at least 26 claimants to the title of emperor, mostly prominent Roman generals, who assumed imperial power over all or part of the empire. The same number of men became accepted by the Roman Senate as emperor during this period and so became legitimate emperors. By 268, the empire had split into three competing states: the Gallic Empire (including the Roman provinces of Gaul, Britannia and, briefly, Hispania); the Palmyrene Empire (including the eastern provinces of Syria Palaestina and Aegyptus); and, between them, the Italian-centered Roman Empire proper.

The reign of Aurelian (270–275) marked a turning point in the crisis period. Aurelian successfully reunited the empire by defeating the two breakaway states, and carried out a series of monetary reforms which helped restore some measure of stability to the Roman economy. The crisis is said to have ended with Diocletian's final victory against Carinus in 285 and his restructuring of the Roman imperial government, economy and military.

== History ==
Following the death of Emperor Marcus Aurelius in 180, the long period of stability and prosperity in the Empire came to an end. Commodus, Marcus Aurelius's son and successor, had little interest in ruling and his reign was notably corrupt, ending with his assassination in 193. What followed was the Year of the Five Emperors, resulting in a power struggle that led Septimius Severus and Clodius Albinus to seize power as co-emperors. This was challenged by Pescennius Niger, leading to a civil war that saw Niger defeated, before Severus turned on and defeated Albinus in 197, after which Severus proclaimed himself sole emperor.

In order to maintain the loyalty of the armies, Severus raised the pay of legionaries, and gave substantial donatives to the troops. This policy was maintained by his successors in the Severan dynasty. Over time the army required larger and larger bribes to remain loyal. The large and ongoing increase in military expenditure caused problems for all of his successors. One of the outcomes of this was the growing influence of the office of Praetorian prefect; initially held by the leader of the Praetorian Guard, under the Severans the position grew to assume greater administrative and advisory duties. Emperor Severus Alexander made the post of prefect open to Senators during his reign, further expanding its influence.

Instead of warring in foreign lands, the Roman Empire was increasingly put on the defensive by marauding enemies and civil wars. This cut off the essential source of income gained from plundering enemy countries, while opening up the Roman countryside to economic devastation from looters both foreign and domestic. Frequent civil wars contributed to depletion of the army's manpower, and drafting replacement soldiers strained the labour force further. Fighting on multiple fronts, increasing size and pay of the army, increasing cost of transport, populist "bread and circuses" political campaigns, inefficient and corrupt tax collection, unorganised budgeting, and paying off foreign nations for peace all contributed to the financial crisis. The emperors responded by confiscating assets and supplies to combat the deficit.

The situation of the Roman Empire became dire in 235. Many Roman legions had been defeated during a previous campaign against Germanic peoples raiding across the borders, while the emperor Severus Alexander had been focused primarily on the dangers from the Sasanian Empire. Leading his troops personally, the emperor resorted to diplomacy and accepting tribute to pacify the Germanic chieftains quickly, rather than military conquest. According to Herodian, this cost Severus Alexander the respect of his troops, who may have felt that more severe punishment was required for the tribes that had intruded on Rome's territory. The troops assassinated Severus Alexander and proclaimed the new emperor to be Maximinus Thrax, commander of one of the legions present.

Maximinus was the first of the barracks emperors – rulers who were elevated by the troops without having any political experience, a supporting faction, distinguished ancestors, or a hereditary claim to the imperial throne. As their rule rested on military might and generalship, they operated as warlords reliant on the army to maintain power. Maximinus continued the campaigns in Germania but struggled to exert his authority over the whole empire. The Senate was displeased at having to accept a peasant as Emperor. This precipitated the chaotic Year of the Six Emperors during which all of the original claimants were killed: in 238 a revolt broke out in Africa led by Gordian I and Gordian II, which was soon supported by the Roman Senate, but this was quickly defeated with Gordian II killed and Gordian I committing suicide. The Senate, fearing the wrath of Maximinus, raised two of their own as co-Emperors, Pupienus and Balbinus, with Gordian I's grandson Gordian III as Caesar. Maximinus marched on Rome but was assassinated by his own troops, and subsequently Pupienus and Balbinus were murdered by the Praetorian Guard.

In the following years, numerous Roman generals fought each other for control of the empire and neglected their duties of defending it from invasion. There were frequent raids across the Rhine and Danube frontier by foreign tribes, including the Carpians, Goths, Vandals, and Alamanni, and attacks from the Sasanian Empire in the east. Climate changes and a sea level rise disrupted the agriculture of what is now the Low Countries, forcing tribes residing in the region to migrate into Roman lands. Further disruption arose in 251, when the Plague of Cyprian (possibly smallpox) broke out. This plague caused large-scale death, severely weakening the empire. The situation was worsened in 260 when the emperor Valerian was captured in battle by the Sasanians (he later died in captivity).

Throughout the period, numerous usurpers claimed the imperial throne. In the absence of a strong central authority, the empire broke into three competing states. The Roman provinces of Gaul, Britain, and Hispania broke off to form the Gallic Empire in 260. The eastern provinces of Syria, Palestine, and Aegyptus also became independent as the Palmyrene Empire in 267. The remaining provinces, centered on Italy, stayed under a single ruler but now faced threats on every side.

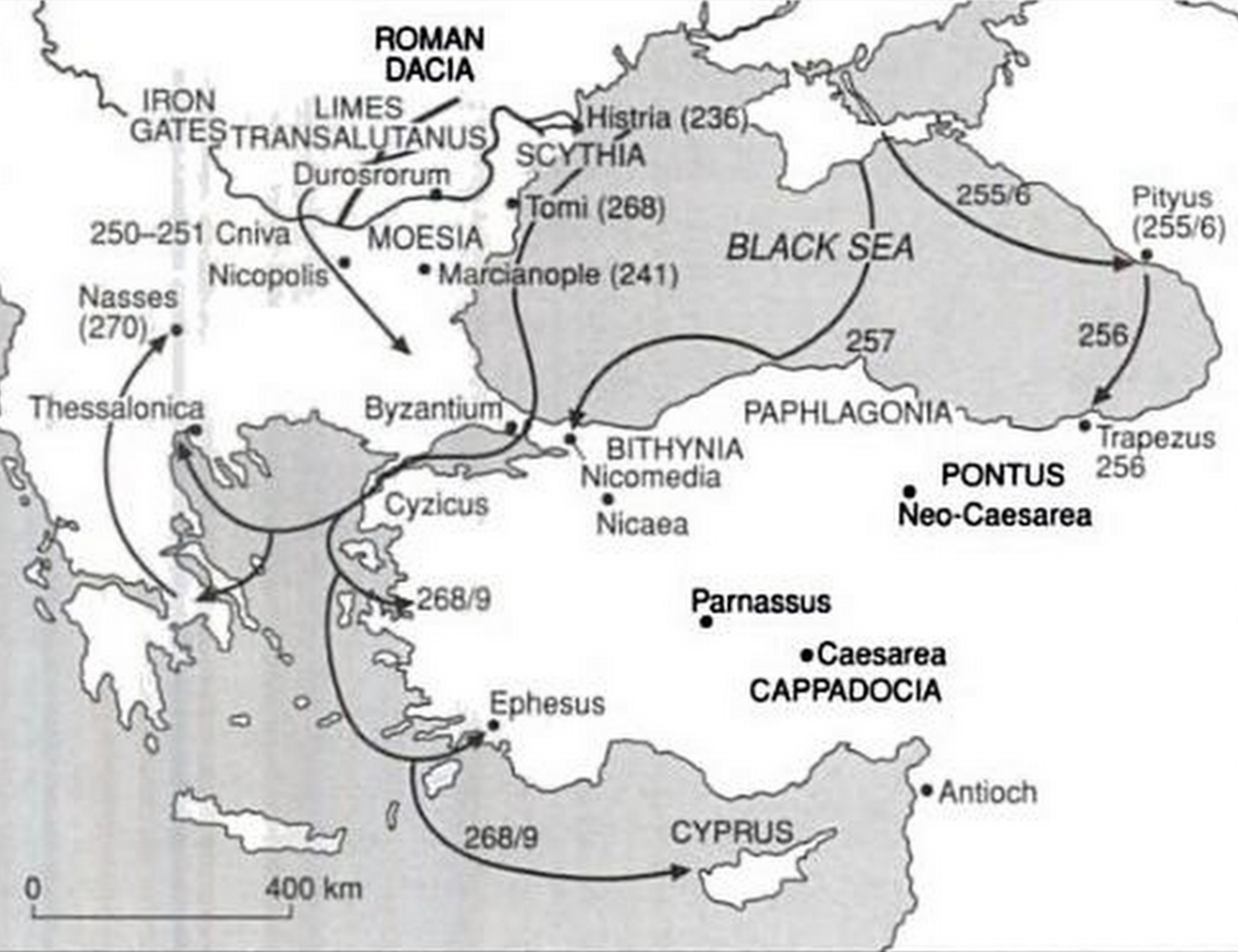
Gothic raids in the 3rd century

An invasion of Macedonia and Greece by Goths, who had been displaced from their lands on the Black Sea, was defeated by emperor Claudius II Gothicus at the Battle of Naissus in 268 or 269. Historians see this victory as the turning point of the crisis. In its aftermath, a series of tough, energetic barracks emperors were able to reassert central authority. Further victories by Claudius Gothicus drove back the Alamanni and recovered Hispania from the Gallic Empire. He died of the plague in 270 and was succeeded by Aurelian, who had commanded the cavalry at Naissus. Aurelian reigned (270–275) through the worst of the crisis, gradually restoring the empire. He defeated the Vandals, Goths, Palmyrene Empire, and finally the remainder of the Gallic Empire. By late 274, the Roman Empire had been reunited into a single entity. However, Aurelian was assassinated in 275, sparking a further series of competing emperors with short reigns. The situation did not stabilize until Diocletian, himself a barracks emperor, reunified the empire in 285.

More than a century would pass before Rome again lost military ascendancy over its external enemies. However, dozens of formerly thriving cities, especially in the Western Empire, had been ruined. Their populations dead or dispersed, these cities could not be rebuilt, due to the economic breakdown caused by constant warfare. The economy was also crippled by the breakdown in trading networks and the debasement of the currency. Major cities and towns, including Rome itself, had not needed fortifications for many centuries, but now surrounded themselves with thick walls.

Fundamental problems with the empire still remained. The right of imperial succession had never been clearly defined, which was a factor in the continuous civil wars as competing factions in the military, Senate, and other parties put forward their favored candidate for emperor. The sheer size of the empire, which had been an issue since the late Roman Republic three centuries earlier, continued to make it difficult for a single ruler to effectively counter multiple threats at the same time. These continuing problems were addressed by the radical reforms of Diocletian, who broke the cycle of usurpation. He began by sharing his rule with a colleague, then formally established the Tetrarchy of four co-emperors in 293. However the trend of civil war would continue after the abdication of Diocletian in the Civil wars of the Tetrarchy (306–324) until the rise of Constantine the Great as sole Emperor. The first Roman emperor Augustus, who had established the Pax Augusta ('Peace of Augustus') in the 1st century BC, had used the title princeps ('leading citizen'). Historians call this first phase of Roman imperial rule the Principate, as Augustus created a system of imperial government that maintained Republican norms and consent given by the Roman Senate. The Principate period ended with the Crisis of the Third Century and the reign of Diocletian, who discontinued the use of the princeps title; from his reign onward emperors used the title domini ('lords').

The crisis resulted in such profound changes in the empire's institutions, society, economic life, and religion that it is increasingly seen by most historians as defining the transition between the historical periods of classical antiquity and late antiquity. The empire survived until 476 in the West and until 1453 in the East.

== Causes ==
=== Problem of succession and civil war ===
From the beginning of the Principate there were no clear rules for the imperial succession, largely because the empire maintained the facade of a republic.

During the early Principate, the process for becoming an emperor relied on a combination of proclamation by the Senate, popular approval, and acceptance by the army, in particular the Praetorian Guard. A family connection to a previous emperor was beneficial, but it did not determine the issue in the way a formal system of hereditary succession would. From the Julio-Claudian dynasty onwards there was sometimes tension between the Senate's preferred choice and the army. As the Senatorial class declined in political influence and more generals were recruited from the provinces, this tension increased.

Whenever the succession appeared uncertain, there was an incentive for any general with support of a sizable army to attempt to seize power, sparking civil war. The most recent example of this prior to the Crisis was the Year of the Five Emperors which resulted in the victory of Septimius Severus. After the overthrow of the Severan dynasty, for the rest of the 3rd century, Rome was ruled by a series of generals, coming into power through frequent civil wars which devastated the empire.

=== Natural disasters ===
The first and most immediately disastrous of the natural disasters that the Roman Empire faced during the Third Century was the plague. The 2nd-century Antonine Plague that preceded the Crisis of the Third Century sapped manpower from Roman armies and proved disastrous for the Roman economy. From 249 to 262, the Plague of Cyprian devastated the Roman Empire to such a degree that some cities, such as the city of Alexandria, experienced a 62% decline in population. These plagues greatly hindered the Roman Empire's ability to ward off barbarian invasions but also factored into problems such as famine, with many farms becoming abandoned and unproductive.

A second and longer-term natural disaster that took place during the third century was the increased variability of weather. Drier summers meant less agricultural productivity and more extreme weather events led to agricultural instability. This could also have contributed to the increased barbarian pressure on Roman borders, as they too would have experienced the detrimental effects of climate change and sought to push inward to more productive areas of the Mediterranean region.

=== Foreign invasions ===
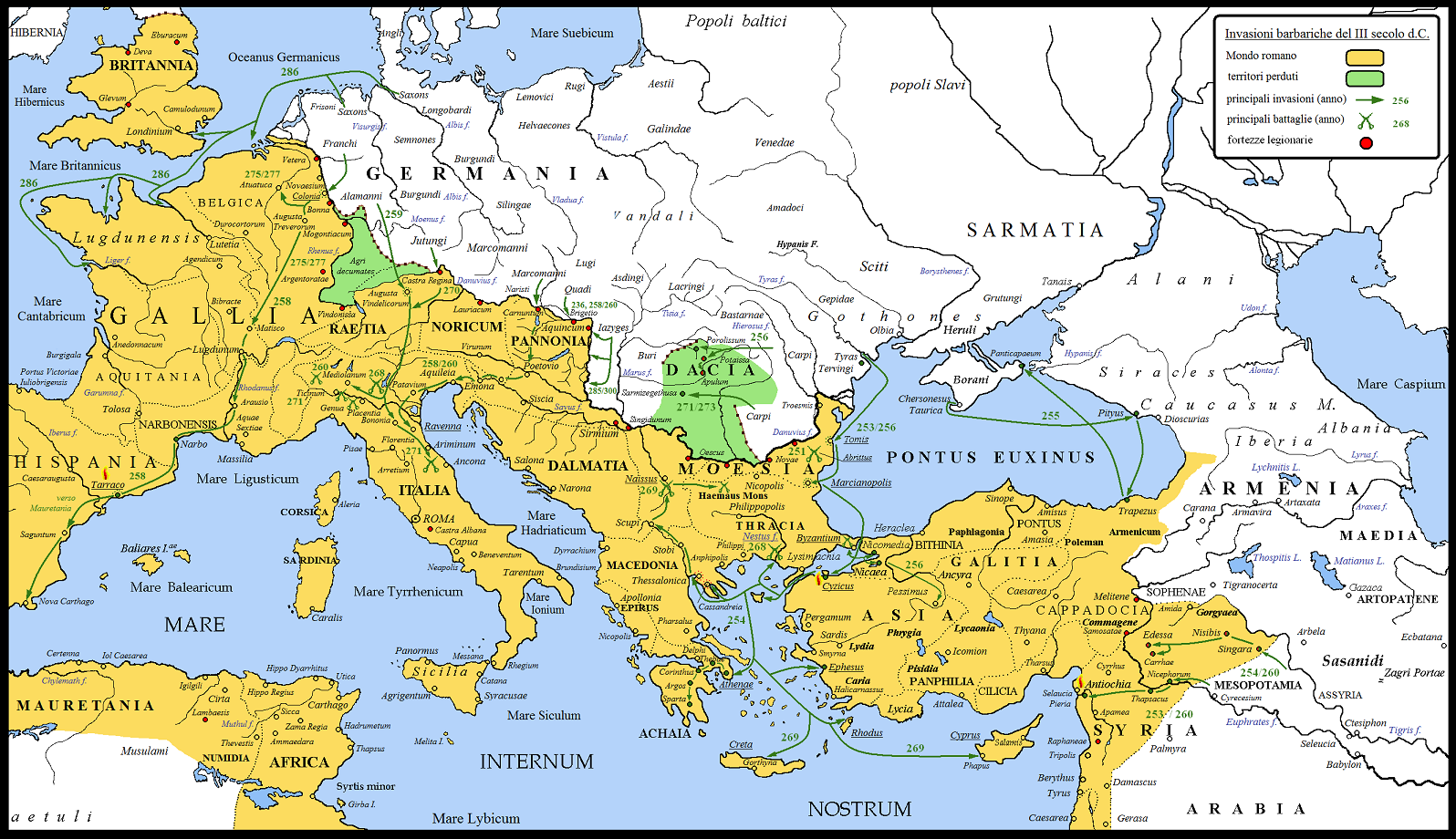
Barbarian invasions against the Roman Empire in the 3rd century

Barbarian invasions came in the wake of civil war, plague, and famine. Distress caused in part by the changing climate led various barbarian tribes to push into Roman territory. Other tribes coalesced into more formidable entities (notably the Alamanni and Franks), or were pushed out of their former territories by more dangerous peoples such as the Sarmatians (the Huns did not appear west of the Volga for another century). Eventually, the frontiers were stabilized by the Illyrian Emperors. However, barbarian migrations into the empire continued in greater and greater numbers. Though these migrants were initially closely monitored and assimilated, later tribes eventually entered the Roman Empire en masse with their weapons, giving only token recognition of Roman authority.

The defensive battles that Rome had to endure on the Danube since the 230s, however, paled in comparison to the threat the empire faced in the East. There, Sassanid Persia represented a far greater danger to Rome than the isolated attacks of Germanic tribes. The Sassanids had in 224 and 226 overthrown the Parthian Arsacids, and the Persian King Ardashir I, who also wanted to prove his legitimacy through military successes, had already penetrated into Roman territory at the time of Severus Alexander, probably taking the strategically important cities of Nisibis and Carrhae in 235/236.

== Economic impact ==
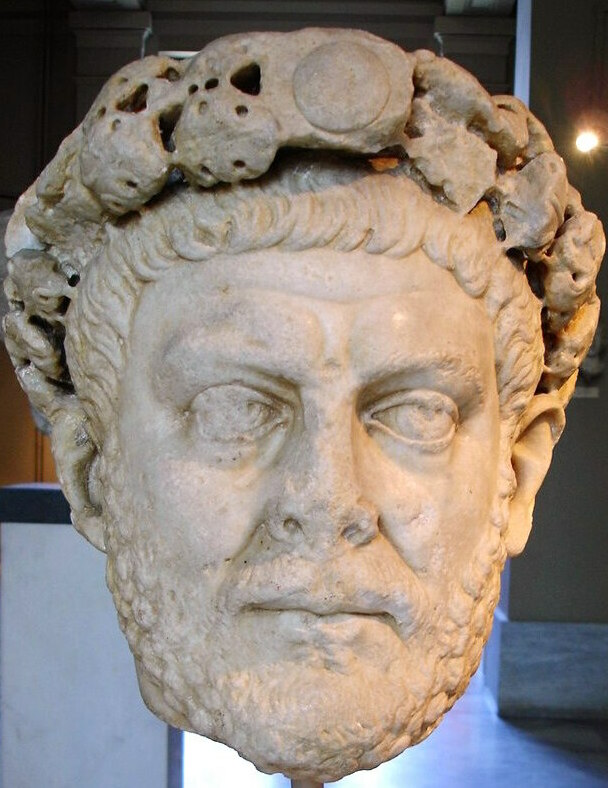
Emperor Diocletian. With his rise to power in 284, the Crisis of the Third Century ended and gave rise to the Tetrarchy

Internally, the empire faced hyperinflation caused by years of coinage devaluation. This had started earlier under the Severan emperors, who kept increasing the army's pay. As inflation worsened, grain prices rose by 200,000% in half a century.

One of the most profound and lasting effects of the crisis was the disruption of Rome's extensive internal trade network. Ever since the Pax Romana, starting with Augustus, the empire's economy had depended in large part on trade between Mediterranean ports and across the extensive road systems to the Empire's interior. Merchants could travel from one end of the empire to the other in relative safety within a few weeks, moving agricultural goods produced in the provinces to the cities, and manufactured goods produced by the great cities of the East to the more rural provinces.

Large estates produced cash crops for export and used the resulting revenues to import food and urban manufactured goods. This resulted in a great deal of economic interdependence among the empire's inhabitants. The historian Henry St. Lawrence Beaufort Moss describes the situation as it stood before the crisis:

Along these roads passed an ever-increasing traffic, not only of troops and officials but of traders, merchandise and even tourists. An interchange of goods between the various provinces rapidly developed, which soon reached a scale unprecedented in the previous history and not repeated until a few centuries ago. Metals mined in the uplands of Western Europe, hides, fleeces, and livestock from the pastoral districts of Britain, Spain, and the shores of the Black Sea, wine and oil from Provence and Aquitaine, timber, pitch and wax from South Russia and northern Anatolia, dried fruits from Syria, marble from the Aegean coasts, and – most important of all – grain from the wheat-growing districts of North Africa, Egypt, and the Danube Valley for the needs of the great cities; all these commodities, under the influence of a highly organized system of transport and marketing, moved freely from one corner of the Empire to the other.

With the onset of the Crisis of the Third Century, however, this vast internal trade network broke down. The widespread civil unrest made it no longer safe for merchants to travel as they once had, and the financial crisis that struck made exchange very difficult with the debased currency. This produced profound changes that, in many ways, foreshadowed the very decentralized economic character of the coming Middle Ages. Large landowners, no longer able to successfully export their crops over long distances, began producing food for subsistence and local barter. Rather than import manufactured goods from the empire's great urban areas, they began to manufacture many goods locally, often on their own estates, thus beginning the self-sufficient "house economy" that would become commonplace in later centuries, reaching its final form in the manorialism of the Middle Ages. The common, free people of the Roman cities, meanwhile, began to move out into the countryside in search of food and better protection.

Made desperate by economic necessity, many of these former city dwellers, as well as many small farmers, were forced to give up hard-earned basic civil rights in order to receive protection from large land-holders. In doing so, they became a half-free class of Roman citizen known as coloni. They were tied to the land, and in later Imperial law, their status was made hereditary. This provided an early model for serfdom, the origins of medieval feudal society and of the medieval peasantry. The decline in commerce between the imperial provinces put them on a path toward increased self-sufficiency. Large landowners, who had become more self-sufficient, became less mindful of Rome's central authority, particularly in the Western Empire, and were downright hostile toward its tax collectors. The measure of wealth at this time began to have less to do with wielding urban civil authority and more to do with controlling large agricultural estates in rural regions since this guaranteed access to the only economic resource of real value – agricultural land and the crops it produced. The common people of the empire lost economic and political status to the land-holding nobility, and the commercial middle classes waned along with their trade-derived livelihoods. The Crisis of the Third Century thus marked the beginning of a long gradual process that would transform the ancient world of classical antiquity into the medieval one of the Early Middle Ages.

However, although the burdens on the population increased, especially the lower strata of the population, this cannot be generalized to the whole empire, especially since living conditions were not uniform. Although the structural integrity of the economy suffered from the military conflicts of that time and the inflationary episode of the 270s, it did not collapse, especially because of the complex regional differences. Recent research has shown that there were regions that prospered even further, such as Egypt, Africa and Hispania. But even for Asia Minor, which was directly affected by attacks, no general decline can be observed. While commerce and the overall economy flourished in several regions, with several provinces not affected by hostilities, other provinces experienced some serious problems, as evidenced by personal hoards in the northwestern provinces of the empire. However, there can be no talk of a general economic crisis throughout the whole of the Empire.

Even the Roman cities began to change in character. The large cities of classical antiquity slowly gave way to the smaller, walled cities that became common in the Middle Ages. These changes were not restricted to the third century, but took place slowly over a long period, and were punctuated with many temporary reversals. In spite of extensive reforms by later emperors, however, the Roman trade network was never able to fully recover to what it had been during the Pax Romana (27 BC – AD 180). This economic decline was far more noticeable and important in the western part of the empire, which was also invaded by barbarian tribes several times during the century. Hence, the balance of power clearly shifted eastward during this period, as evidenced by the choice of Diocletian to rule from Nicomedia in Asia Minor, putting his second in command, Maximian, in Milan. This would have a considerable impact on the later development of the empire with a richer, more stable eastern empire surviving the end of Roman rule in the west.

While imperial revenues fell, imperial expenses rose sharply. More soldiers, greater proportions of cavalry, and the ruinous expense of walling in cities all added to the toll. Goods and services previously paid for by the government were now demanded in addition to monetary taxes. The empire suffered from a crippling labour shortage. The steady exodus of both rich and poor from the cities and now-unprofitable professions forced Diocletian to use compulsion; conscription was made universal, most trades were made hereditary, and workers could not legally leave their jobs or travel elsewhere to seek better-paying ones. This included the unwanted middle-class civil service positions and under Constantine, the military. Constantine also tried to provide social programs for the poor to reduce the labour shortage.

== Emperors ==
The rulers of the Crisis of the Third Century are also known as the barracks emperors. Beginning with Maximinus, over 50 different people claimed the title of augustus ("emperor") (Note: The term "Emperor", as understood in modern times, did not exist in Ancient Rome. Augustus was the de facto main title of the ruler, but it was rarely used when referring to the office. The common Latin term was imperator, originally a military honorific roughly equivalent to "commander". Octavian, the first emperor, ruled while maintaining the facade of a Republican state. He did not create a new office for himself, instead adopting the pre-existing honorific of princeps senatus, the foremost senator. In fact, the final transition into a monarchy was only concreted after his death.), but only about half of them managed to become "legitimate" through their recognition by the Roman Senate. Many of these "soldier-emperors" attempted to create stability by appointing their descendants as heirs or co-rulers, resulting in several brief dynasties. With the exception of Claudius Gothicus, every single "legitimate" emperor died in a violent manner, often killed by their own troops. Emperors who did not achieved wide recognition are called usurpers (tyrannus in Latin).

Usurpation, that is, the unauthorized assumption of the imperial title, was relatively common during all of Roman imperial history. Given that real power was ultimately based on brute force and control of the army, it became common to see one or several Roman generals try to take power by force, just as Julius Caesar did in his time. This was solidified early on with the accession of Claudius, the fourth emperor, who was raised to the throne by the Praetorian Guard after the murder of Caligula. The role of the army increased in the following century, leading the way to the military anarchy.

All the emperors of this period based their power on the military and on the soldiers of the field armies. Thus, the centre of decision-making shifted away from Rome and to wherever the emperor was with his armies. Rome lost its role as the political center of the empire, although it remained ideologically important. (Note: This later led to the transfer of the capital to the four cities Milan, Trier, Nicomedia, and Sirmium, and then to Constantinople.) In order to legitimize and secure their rule, the emperors of the third century put military successes above all else. The Senate ceased to be the main governing organ and instead members of the equestrian class who filled the army became increasingly prominent.

The chronology follows Kienast 2017 and Peachin 1990 (see also Burgess 2014), with biographical information from Vagi 2000 and Adkins 2019.

=== Roman Empire (235–285) ===
(#) – Usurpers / claimants
(§) – Junior co-emperors
(§) – Heir-apparents

Bust	Coin	Name	Approximate reign	Notes
==== Maximinian dynasty (235–238) ====
		Maximinus I "Thrax"; Gaius Julius Verus Maximinus (Note: Maximinus was not a member of the Julia gens, as his name may indicate. Countless new citizens adopted the names of their patrons during the early Empire, resulting in several "new Romans" bearing names such as Julius, Flavius, Septimius, etc. The Gordians, for instance, had the names "Marcus Antonius" after the triumvir and ally of Julius Caesar.)	March 235 – June 238 (Note: Maximinus' official dies imperii was almost certainly 23 March. He was co-opted into the sodales Antoniniani (the cult of Antoninus Pius) on 25 March, in Rome. However, it is impossible to know exactly how much time it would have taken for news of his proclamation to travel from Mainz to Rome. According to contemporary papyri: Maximinus was still recognized in Egypt by 7 April 238; the two Gordians are first mentioned in 13 June, Pupienus and Balbinus appear in documents dated to 21 July and 8 September, while Gordian III first appears in 21 September. News often took 1 month to travel from Rome to Egypt. It is impossible to determine exact dates on these events; any dates given by modern scholars are just conjectural.) (3 years and 3 months)	Born c. 173 in Thracia, hence his nickname. Proclaimed emperor by his troops during a mutiny against Alexander in Mogontiacum, Germania Superior. A man of humble origins, the first commoner to become emperor, he was hated by the Senate because he never visited Rome. His heavy taxation policy made him unpopular, and the Senate declared him a public enemy. He was killed at the age of 65 in Northern Italy by the Legio II Parthica after the Siege of Aquileia against followers of Pupienus and Balbinus.
		Magnus; Gaius Petronius Magnus	late 235 (in Germania)	A patrician ex-consul; said to have been hailed emperor after Alexander's murder. Herodian suggests that he was actually incriminated.
		Titus Quartinus	late 235 / early 236 (Note: He reigned six months according to the Historia Augusta, but this must be an exaggeration. Herodian's narrative suggest he was killed rather quickly.) (in Mesopotamia)	Ex-consul; reluctantly hailed by troops loyal to Alexander. He was later killed by the same man who proclaimed him emperor.
(possible)		Maximus; Gaius Julius Verus Maximus	January/May 236 – June 238 (caesar under Maximinus I)	Son of Maximinus and Caecilia Paulina, born c. 215; incorrectly called "Maximinus" by some sources. Lost his mother sometime before 235; Maximinus honored her with the titles of augusta and diva. Named caesar (heir) by his father at the age of 20; killed alongside him in the battlefield.
==== Gordian dynasty (238) ====
(Note: The bust in the Capitoline Museums labelled as Gordian I has no real historical basis.)		Gordian I Marcus Antonius Gordianus Sempronianus Romanus "Africanus"	c. April – May 238 (22 days, in Africa)	Father and son, proclaimed joint emperors during a revolt against Maximinus; recognized as legitimate emperor shortly after by the Roman Senate. The nearly 80-years-old Gordian I, one of the richest Romans at the time and the oldest emperor at accession, was a former consul and was given governorship over the African province shortly before the revolt. The 46-years-old Gordian II, the shortest reigning Roman emperor, was killed in Carthage fighting a pro-Maximinus army led by Capelianus; his father committed suicide right after.
		Gordian II; Marcus Antonius Gordianus Sempronianus Romanus "Africanus"	c. April – May 238 (22 days, in Africa)	
==== Non-dynastic (238) ====
		Pupienus; Marcus Clodius Pupienus Maximus	c. May – August 238 (99 days)	Senior senators and former consuls (Pupienus was 74, Balbinus 60), elected joint emperors by the Senate after the death of the Gordians and in opposition to Maximinus, who was on his way to Italy. Made regents of the caesar Gordian III, who was given the title by popular demand. Pupienus organized military affairs, while Balbinus saw administrative matters. They soon developed a destructive rivalry, and were assassinated by the displeased Praetorian Guard only one month after Maximinus' death.
		Balbinus; Decimus Caelius Calvinus Balbinus	c. May – August 238 (99 days)	Senior senators and former consuls (Pupienus was 74, Balbinus 60), elected joint emperors by the Senate after the death of the Gordians and in opposition to Maximinus, who was on his way to Italy. Made regents of the caesar Gordian III, who was given the title by popular demand. Pupienus organized military affairs, while Balbinus saw administrative matters. They soon developed a destructive rivalry, and were assassinated by the displeased Praetorian Guard only one month after Maximinus' death.
==== Gordian dynasty (238–244) ====
		Gordian III; Marcus Antonius Gordianus "Pius"	c. August 238 – February 244 (5 years and 6 months)	Grandson of Gordian I, born in Rome on 20 January 222. Made caesar by the Senate in May 238, succeeded as augustus at age 13, the youngest sole emperor. Reigned under the regency of the Senate and, from 241, of the praetorian prefect Timesitheus, whose daughter Tranquillina he married. Died following the Battle of Misiche against the Persians, aged 19 (some Roman sources claim he was killed by Philip).
		Sabinian; Marcus Asinius Sabinianus	240 (in Africa)	Ex-consul and proconsul of Africa; killed by the governor of Mauretania.
==== Philippian dynasty (244–249) ====
		Philip I "the Arab"; Marcus Julius Philippus	February 244 – September 249 (5 years and 7 months)	Born c. 204 in Roman Arabia, made praetorian prefect of Gordian III after the sudden death of Timesitheus in 243. Proclaimed emperor after the Battle of Misiche, after which he made peace with the Sassanids in shameful terms. Suffered several revolt at the end of his reign, finally being killed at the Battle of Verona against Decius, aged 45. During his rule Rome celebrated its 1000th anniversary. Some later sources claim he was the first Christian emperor, but this is most unlikely.
(possible)		Philip II "the Younger"; Marcus Julius Severus Philippus	c. July 247 – September 249 (co-augustus under Philip I)	Son of Philip I and Marcia Otacilia Severa, born c. 237. Proclaimed caesar in 244 and later co-augustus in 247, at the age of 10. Killed as soon as news of his father's death reached Rome (although some say he was killed alongside him).
		Pacatian; Tiberius Claudius Marinus Pacatianus	c. 248 / 249 (Danube)	Commander in Moesia or Pannonia and a former consul; defeated by Decius and killed by his own soldiers shortly after. His rule came on (or shortly after) Rome's 1000th anniversary.
		Jotapian; Marcus Fulvius Ru(fus) Jotapianus	c. 249 (Levant)	A member of Near East nobility, perhaps related to the ancient kings of Commagene, claimed descent from Alexander the Great. Revolted for several months in Syria and Cappadocia in response to the heavy taxation policies of Priscus, Philip's brother and governor of the East. Like many, Jotapian was eventually killed by his own soldiers.
		Silbannacus; Mar(cius?) Silbannacus	c. 249 (?) (Gaul?)	Only known for two coins, possibly a usurper in Gaul (or perhaps Rome). According to one view, he may be related to Marcia Otacilia Severa, Philip's wife.
		Sponsianus	c. 249 (??) (Balkans?)	Existence disputed, only known for a few coins found in Transylvania that reuse old Republican denarii.
==== Decian dynasty (249–251) ====
		Decius; Gaius Messius Quintus Traianus Decius	c. September 249 – June 251 (1 year and 9 months)	Born as C. Messius Q. Decius Valerinus in Sirmium, Pannonia Inferior. City prefect in Rome and former consul, send to the Danube to fight the usurper Pacatian and secure the border. Proclaimed emperor by the Danube troops; killed Philip at the Battle of Verona, later recognized the Senate, which gave him the honorific "Trajan" after the beloved emperor. Killed by the Goths at the Battle of Abritus, one of the worst Roman defeats in record.
(Note: Some authors have identified the central figure of the Ludovisi Battle sarcophagus as one of Decius' sons, either Herennius Etruscus or Hostilian. These identifications, however, have little height. Aurelius Victor implies that Etruscus was old enough to lead an army, but his coin consistently depict him as a beardless young boy. Hostilian, who was much younger, is likewise portrayed as a young boy. The general of the sarcophagus may not even be an emperor at all.)		Herennius Etruscus; Quintus Herennius Etruscus Messius Decius	May/June – June 251 (less than a month, under Decius)	Young son of Decius, proclaimed caesar and later augustus, killed with his father.
		Priscus; Titus Julius Priscus	c. 251	Governor of Macedonia, proclaimed emperor in Philippopolis during a siege by Goths.
		Licinian; Julius Valens Licinianus	c. 251 (very briefly, in Rome)	Obscure senator that proclaimed himself emperor in Rome, possibly with support of the Senate, in the absence of Decius. Was defeated by Valerian.
==== Vibian dynasty (251–253) ====
		Trebonianus Gallus; Gaius Vibius Trebonianus Gallus	June 251 – August 253 (3 years and 2 months)	Senator, former consul and commander of Moesia, proclaimed emperor after the death of Decius. Suffered the propagation of the Cyprian Plague, which further weakened the Empire, and faced enemies in several fronts. Killed with his son during his confrontation against Aemilianus, the Danubian commander.
		Hostilian; Gaius Valens Hostilianus Messius Quintus	c. June – c. July 251 (1 month, under Gallus)	Son of Decius, proclaimed caesar and augustus by Gallus as a way to maintain legitimacy. Possibly died of plague.
(possible)		Volusianus; Gaius Vibius Afinius Gallus Veldumnianus Volusianus	August 251 – August 253 (2 years, under Gallus)	Son of Gallus, named caesar and then augustus on the death of Hostilian. Appears to have ruled only as subordinate to his father, as virtually nothing is known about him.
==== Non-dynastic (253) ====
		Aemilianus; Marcus Aemilius Aemilianus	c. July – c. September 253 (two months)	Commander in Moesia, proclaimed emperor by his troops; defeated Gallus in battle. Only ruled alone for a single month before being killed by another pretender, Valerian.
==== Licinian dynasty (253–268) ====
		Valerian; Publius Licinius Valerianus	c. September 253 – c. June 260 (6 years and c. 9 months, East)	Member of an ancient senatorial family (the Licinii) and former consul, proclaimed emperor after the death of Trebonianus Gallus, recognized in Rome alongside his son Gallienus. Divided the empire in two, with himself ruling over the East while his son ruled over the West. Defeated and captured by the Persians at the Battle of Edessa, an unprecedented disaster in Roman military history.
		Gallienus; Publius Licinius Egnatius Gallienus	c. September 253 – c. September 268 (15 years)	Son of Valerian and Egnatia Mariniana, named senior co-emperor at the age of 35, ruling over the Western provinces. Became sole emperor after his father's, having the longest reign since the start of the crisis. A persevering ruler, he faced a large number of usurpers and foreign invasions. Murdered during his confrotation against Aureolus in a conspiracy led by the praetorian prefect Heraclianus, the future emperor Aurelian, and Claudius II, who succeeded Gallienus.
		Valerian II; Publius Licinius Cornelius Valerianus	256–258 (caesar under Valerian and Gallienus)	Son and heir of Gallienus. Died in unclear circumstances, likely assassinated by his guardian Ingenuus, who then claimed the imperial title.
(possible)		Saloninus; Publius Licinius Cornelius Saloninus Valerianus	Autumn 260 (co-augustus under Gallienus)	Son and heir of Gallienus, named caesar in 258, proclaimed emperor by his father's troops during Postumus' siege of Cologne; killed just a few weeks later. His acclamation was not authorized by Gallienus, but had he survived it would certainly have been recognized. Posthumous coinage avoid any title, perhaps as a way to hide the crises in the family.
		Uranius Antoninus; Lucius Julius Aurelius Sulpicius Severus Uranius Antoninus	c. 253 / 254 (Syria)	Born as Sampsiceramus, initially a priest of the cult of Elagabal, likely a descendant of Elagabalus. Proclaimed emperor after successfully defending Emesa from the Persian forces of Shapur I; fate unknown.
		Ingenuus	c. 260 (Pannonia)	Governor of Pannonia, proclaimed in Sirmium by the legions of Moesia after the capture of Valerian, defeated and killed and in Mursa.
		Regalianus; P(ublius) C(assius) Regalianus	c. 260 (Pannonia)	A native of Dacia, commander in Illyricum. Proclaimed emperor in Moesia but killed shortly after, perhaps by his own troops upon Gallienus' arrival.
		Macrianus Minor; Titus Fulvius Junius Macrianus	c. 260 – 261 (in the East)	Sons of Macrianus Major, Valerian's quartermaster general, who was proclaimed emperor by the praetorian prefect Balista but refused due to his age and health, instead proclaiming his two sons, both legates, as joint emperors and consuls. They quickly took over most of the East (Egypt, Syria and Asia) while Gallienus fought in the West. Both Macrianus were eventually defeated at Illyricum by Aureolus, while Quietus, the younger brother, was sieged by Odaenathus in Emesa with Ballista and killed.
		Quietus; Titus Fulvius Junius Quietus	c. 260 – 261 (in the East)	Sons of Macrianus Major, Valerian's quartermaster general, who was proclaimed emperor by the praetorian prefect Balista but refused due to his age and health, instead proclaiming his two sons, both legates, as joint emperors and consuls. They quickly took over most of the East (Egypt, Syria and Asia) while Gallienus fought in the West. Both Macrianus were eventually defeated at Illyricum by Aureolus, while Quietus, the younger brother, was sieged by Odaenathus in Emesa with Ballista and killed.
		Valens "Thessalonicus"	c. 261 (Achaia/Macedonia)	Proconsul of Achaia, probably gained his nickname after defending Thessalonica. Proclaimed emperor during his confrontation against Piso, one of Macrianus' generals. Valens defeated him, but was killed by his own soldiers shortly after.
		Aemilianus (II); Lucius Mussius Aemilianus "Aegippius"	c. 261 – 262 (Egypt)	A distinguished officer who supported the revolt of Macrianus, claimed imperial power after their deaths, probably to avoid punishment. Defeated by Aurelius Theodotus.
		Memor	c. 262 (?)	A mauri briefly mentioned by Zosimus (c. 500 AD) and Peter the Patrician (c. 550 AD). Likely a follower of Macrianus, he may have never actually claimed imperial power.
		Aureolus (Manius Acilius) Aeolus	268 (Northern Italy)	Native of Dacia and Gallienus' right-hand man. Defeated the usurpers Ingenuus (260) and Macrianus (261), but later allied himself with Postumus against Gallienus. He proclaimed himself emperor following Gallienus' death, but was quickly killed by Claudius' troops after surrendering to him.
==== Gallic Empire (260–274) ==== The Gallic Empire was a breakaway part of the Roman Empire that, unlike most usurper-ruled territories, functioned de facto as a separate state from 260 to 274. It had its own capital (Trier), a clear succession of emperors, its own pair of yearly-elected consuls, and even its own usurpers. At its height, the Empire controlled all Western European provinces: Hispania, Gaul and Britannia. The term "Gallic Empire" and "Gallic Emperor" are modern conventions; its rulers continued to use the standard imperial titulature without changes.
		Postumus; Marcus Cassianius Latinius Postumus	c. 260 – April/August 269 (about 9 years)	Governor of Germania under Emperor Gallienus, proclaimed emperor after a military victory, after which he killed Gallienus' son Saloninus at Cologne. Established a court in Trier, but made no moves against the Emperor in Rome. He was killed by his troops in the aftermath of Laelian's usurpation, as he did not allow them to sack Mainz.
		Laelian; Ulpius Cornelius Laelianus	mid-269 (Germania, 2 months or less)	General under Postumus, revolted in Mainz in February or June 269, possibly in coordination with Claudius II's forces, which constantly attacked Southern Germania. He was related to the Hispanic emperor Trajan (r. 98–117), which made him earn support from that region. Laelian was quickly defeated by Postumus; Hispania switched allegiance to Claudius II shortly after.
		Marius; Marcus Aurelius Marius	c. 269 (a few months, more than Laelian)	A blacksmith that was proclaimed emperor in Mainz after Laelian and Postumus' demise, but was killed shortly after. Ancient sources give him a reign of only a couple of days, but this is impossible given the amount of coinage produced during his reign.
		Victorinus; Marcus Piavonius Victorinus	c. 269 – 271 (about 3 years)	Proclaimed emperor after Marius' assassination with the support of his mother Victoria, a wealthy noblewoman who probably contributed to the fall of Postumus. Failed to maintain Hispania and faced pro-Roman revolts in central Germania. Said to have been a womanizer, he was killed
		Domitian (II); Domitianus	c. 271 (very shortly)	Obscure figure that briefly rebelled in Gaul, perhaps during Victorinus' reign.
		Tetricus I Gaius Esuvius Tetricus	c. 271 – 274 (about 3 years)	Governor of Aquitania; proclaimed emperor at Bordeaux with the support of Victoria, Victorinus' mother. He surrendered to Aurelian after the Battle of Châlons against his troops, although Tetricus appears to have been secretly arranged his abdication with the Emperor, who pardon him and appointed him as governor of Lucania (Southern Italy).
		Tetricus II; Gaius Esuvius Tetricus	c. 273 – 274 (caesar under Tetricus I)	Young son of Tetricus, almost nothing known except that he lived on to have a distinguished senatorial career. There is some debate on whether he was proclaimed augustus on the final weeks on the Gallic empire, as the evidence (coins) for this are rare and of disputed authenticity.
		Faustinus (?)	274	Governor of Gallia Belgica, rebelled against Tetricus, who was forced to ask Aurelian for help. Not known if he actually claimed the imperial title.
==== Claudian dynasty (268–270) ====
(possible)		Claudius II "Gothicus"; Marcus Aurelius Claudius	c. September 268 – August (?) 270 (1 year or less)	Born on 10 May 214, claimed descent from Gordian II, posthumously named a relative of Constantine the Great. Fought for Gallienus against the usurpers Ingenuus, Postumus and Aureolus, but then turned against him with Aurelian and had himself proclaimed emperor. Defeated the Goths at the Battle of Naissus, hence his nickname, and recovered most of Hispania, thus beginning the restoration of the Empire. Died as a result of the Plague of Cyprian, aged 56.
		Quintillus; Marcus Aurelius Claudius Quintillus	270 (17–77 days) (Note: Quintillus' reign is said to have lasted 17 days (Jerome, Eutropius and Zonaras), 77 days (Filocalus), or "a few months" (Zosimus). 17 days is certainly wrong, but 77 days seems like too much. One modern proposal is 27, although 66 is also possible. Most contemporary documents can't be dated precisely and thus the chronology has remained debated. For example, Arthur Stein dated Claudius' death to April, citing a document of Aurelian that he dated to 25 May 270. However, some scholars argue this document must be dated to 271.)	Younger brother of Claudius, declared emperor after his death. Events of his reign are contradictory; died after a reign of a few weeks of either suicide or assassination.
==== Palmyrene Empire (271–273) ==== The Palmyrene Empire was a short-lived breakaway state centered around the city of Palmyra. It encompassed the Roman provinces of Syria Palaestina, Arabia Petraea, and Egypt, as well as large parts of Asia Minor. Chaos consumed the East following the capture of Valerian and the revolts of Macrianus, but the territories were eventually pacified by Odaenathus, who was named Dux Romanorum ("leader of the Romans") and Corrector totius orientis (essentially "governor of all the East") by Gallienus, effectively turning the territory into a semi-independent entity. Odaenathus was proclaimed "King of Kings" (rex regum), but remained loyal to the Emperor. He was murdered by his son Hairan in 267, who was in turn killed by his cousin Maeonius. The throne went to Odaenathus' young son Vaballathus, who reigned under the regency of his mother Zenobia.
		Vaballathus; Lucius Julius Aurelius Septimius Vaballathus Athenodorus (Note: "Vaballathus" is the Latinized form of his Palmyrene Aramaic name, Wahballāt, "Gift of Allāt". As the Arabian goddess Allāt came to be identified with Athena, he used Athenodorus as the Greek form of his name.)	c. March – June 272 (Note: Egyptian documents stopped recognizing Aurelian between 17 April (last mention as co-ruler of Zenobia) and 24 June (first mention as sole ruler). Zenobia and her son may have adopted the imperial titles shortly before this, but it's not certain.) (about 3 months)	Young son of Zenobia and Odaenathus, succeeded his father as dux, corrector and rex of Palmyra with the addition of the titles consul and imperator, although all real power was held by Zenobia. He was given the imperial title (augustus) by his mother in 272.
		Zenobia	c. March – June 272 (about 3 months)	A remarkable and cultured stateswoman; wife of Odaenathus and mother of Vaballathus, de facto ruler of the East since 267, conquered Egypt in late 271, assumed the title of augusta in early 272. She first attempted to rule as a co-equal to Aurelian, with no results. She was spared, however, and was allowed to retire with his son, later marrying a senator.
		Antiochus	273 (very briefly)	Son of Zenobia, perhaps still a child. Proclaimed emperor during a revolt against the restored Roman rule in Palmyra. The rebellion was crushed, but he was spared.
==== Non dynastic (270–282) ====
(possible)		Aurelian "Restitutor"; Lucius Domitius Aurelianus	August (?) 270 – November (?) 275 (5 years and a few months)	Born on 9 September 214, proclaimed emperor in opposition to Quintillus. Named "restorer of the World" (restitutor orbis) after his unprecedented series of military victories. Reconquered the territories of the Palmyrene and Gallic Empire; built the Aurelian Walls in Rome and reformed the falling economy. Murdered by his secretary Eros, aged 61, while preparing for a campaign against Persia, as response for Aurelian's strict character.
		Septimius	c. 271	Rebelled in Dalmatia; killed by his own men. Briefly mentioned by Zosimus and Victor.
		Urbanus (?)	either 271 or 272 AD	Nothing known, only briefly mentioned by Zosimus.
		Tacitus; Marcus Claudius Tacitus	c. December 275 – c. June 276 (c. 6 months)	A former Illyrian soldier, proclaimed emperor by the army (and not the Senate, as claimed by the Historia Augusta, who also claims he was a distinguished 75-years-old senator) after a brief interregnum. (Note: Older scholarship claimed that there was as six-month interregnum in which Ulpia Severina, Aurelian's wife, and the Senate ruled the Empire, but this is now rejected as part of the many false narratives in the Historia Augusta.) Died of either illness or murder while campaigning in Cappadocia.
		Florianus; Marcus Annius Florianus	c. June – September 276 (80–88 days)	Maternal half-brother of Tacitus, proclaimed himself emperor after his death but killed shortly after. Said to have done "nothing worth remembering" according to Eutropius. He was killed by his own soldiers while fighting Probus.
		Probus; Marcus Aurelius Probus	c. June 276 – c. September 282 (c. 6 years and 3 months)	Born on 19 August 232, proclaimed emperor by the eastern legions in opposition to Florianus. Spent his reign fighting in both West and East, winning several victories, but exhausting his army. He was killed, aged 60, during the revolt of Carus.
		Bonosus	280 (Germany)	Commanders in Germany, proclaimed emperors at Cologne (alternatively, they were proclaimed separately, but soon joined forces). Bonosus committed suicide after facing Probus' army, while Proculus was either killed in battle or executed soon after.
		Procolus	280 (Germany)	Commanders in Germany, proclaimed emperors at Cologne (alternatively, they were proclaimed separately, but soon joined forces). Bonosus committed suicide after facing Probus' army, while Proculus was either killed in battle or executed soon after.
		Saturninus; Gaius Julius Sallustius Saturninus Fortunatianus	c. 281 (Egypt)	A former consul native of Africa and commander in the East, revolted in Antioch. Hoped to gain recognition by Probus, with no results. He was killed by his own soldiers near Apamea in the ensuing confrontation.
==== Caran dynastic (282–285) ====
(possible)		Carus; Marcus Aurelius Carus	c. September 282 – c. July 283 (c. 10 months)	Praetorian prefect under Probus, proclaimed emperor in Raetia/Noricum, seized power upon Probus' murder. Launched a successful campaign against the Persians, but died before finishing it, likely killed by his praetorian prefect Aper.
		Carinus; Marcus Aurelius Carinus	Spring 283 – July 285 (2 years, West)	Son of Carus, appointed joint emperor shortly before his death. Succeeded jointly with Numerian, with himself ruling over the Western provinces, where he won several victories. Defeated and killed by Diocletian at the Battle of the Margus. He was villainized by ancient historians as part of pro-Diocletianic propaganda, although some of the criticisms may have been legitimate.
(possible)		Numerian; Marcus Aurelius Numerianus	c. July 283 – November 284 (1 year and 3/4 months, East)	Younger son of Carus, spent most of his reign traveling back to the West after the successful Persian campaign. Possibly assassinated by Aper, like his father.
		Diocletian; Gaius Valerius Diocletianus	20 November 284 – July 285 (as a usurper in the East)	Born as Diocles on 22 December 242 (or 243) in Dalmatia, said to have been the son of a scribe or a freedman (former slave). Proclaimed emperor in Nicomedia after the death of Numerian. His first act was to execute Aper, and then marched West to face Carinus. Reunited the Roman Empire after the Battle of the Margus.
		Julian; Marcus Aurelius Sabinus Julianus	c. November 284 – c. February 285 (Pannonia, 3 months or less)	Governor of Venice, revolted in north-eastern Italy after the death of Numerian, but was quickly defeated near Verona by Carinus, who used Julian's soldiers to fight the approaching Diocletian. Sometimes treated as two emperors, one Marcus Aurelius Julianus, in Pannonia, and another Sabinius Julianus, in Italy.

== Timeline ==
- Red denotes Emperors
- Blue denotes Caesars (official heirs)

== See also ==
- Bagaudae
- Sengoku period – a similar period in Japanese history
- Warring States period and Three Kingdoms period – similar periods in Chinese history (the latter roughly contemporaneous with the Crisis of the Third Century)
- Jublains archeological site documents some effects of the crisis in what is now western France
- Barbarian invasions of the 3rd century
- Low Roman Empire
- Coinage from Maximinus Thrax to Aemilianus

== General and cited references ==
- Adkins, Lesley; Adkins, Roy A. (2014). "Emperors". Handbook to Life in Ancient Rome. New York: Infobase Publishing. pp. 27–37. ISBN 9780816074822.
- Allen, Larry (2009). The Encyclopedia of Money (2nd ed.). Santa Barbara, CA: ABC-CLIO. pp. 346–348. ISBN 978-1598842517.
- Burgess, Richard W. (2014). Roman imperial chronology and early-fourth-century historiography. Historia Einzelschriften. Stuttgart: Steiner. ISBN 978-3-515-10732-7.
- Craven, Maxwell (2019). The Imperial Families of Ancient Rome. Fonthill Media. ISBN 978-1781557389.
- Davies, Glyn (1997) [1994]. A History of Money: From Ancient Times to the Present Day (Reprint ed.). Cardiff: University of Wales Press. pp. 95–99. ISBN 978-0708313510.
- Kienast, Dietmar; Werner Eck & Matthäus Heil (2017) [1990]. Römische Kaisertabelle: Grundzüge einer römischen Kaiserchronologie [Roman imperial table: Basics of the Roman imperial chronology] (in German) (6th ed.). Darmstadt: WBG. ISBN 978-3-534-26724-8.
- Jones, A. H. M.; Martindale, J. R.; Morris, John, eds. (1971–1992). The Prosopography of the Later Roman Empire. Cambridge University Press. (see PLRE)
- Peachin, Michael (1990). Roman Imperial Titulature and Chronology, A.D. 235–284. Amsterdam: Gieben. ISBN 90-5063-034-0.
- Vagi, David L. (2000). Coinage and History of the Roman Empire, C. 82 B.C.--A.D. 480: History. Taylor & Francis. ISBN 978-1-57958-316-3.
- Southern, Patricia (2001). The Roman Empire from Severus to Constantine. New York: Routledge. ISBN 0-415-23944-3.
- Moss, Henry St. Lawrence Beaufort (1935). The Birth of the Middle Ages. London: Oxford University Press.
- Watson, Alaric (2004) [1999]. Aurelian and the Third Century. Routledge. ISBN 978-1-134-90815-8.
- Lot, Ferdinand (1961). The End of the Ancient World and the Beginnings of the Middle Ages. New York: Harper & Row. ISBN 978-0-06-131044-7.
- White, John F. (2015). The Roman Emperor Aurelian: Restorer of the World. Barnsley, UK: Pen and Sword. ISBN 978-1-4738-4477-3.
