= Battle of Châlons (274) =

Battle between the Roman and Gallic empires

Coordinates: 48.9575°N 4.365°E

Battle of Châlons Clades Catalaunica
- Part of the Crisis of the Third Century
- Battle of Châlons (274) (France)
Date	273 or 274 AD, perhaps in February or March
Location	Unknown location, now estimated to be near Châlons-en-Champagne, France
Result	Roman victory; End of the Gallic Empire.; Reunification of the Roman Empire.

Belligerents
Roman Empire	Gallic Empire

Commanders and leaders
Emperor Aurelian	Tetricus I (surrendered)

Strength
35,000 legionaries 15,000 archers and slingers 5,000 cavalry	Unknown but bigger than Roman army; maybe 60,000–90,000

Casualties and losses
6,000 (Roman sources)	50,000 (Roman sources)

The Roman Emperor Aurelian

The Battle of Châlons, also known as the First Battle of the Catalaunian Plains, was fought in 273 or 274 in the land of the Catalauni, at an unknown location probably not far from the present-day Châlons-en-Champagne, France. In the battle, the Roman Emperor Aurelian defeated the Emperor Tetricus I of the Gallic Empire, whose territories were thus recovered by the Roman Empire after 14 years of separation.

== Background ==
Having subdued revolts in the eastern Roman Empire, Aurelian began preparing to reconquer the Gallic Empire by early 274. Meanwhile, Tetricus' hold on his domain was steadily weakening, as he faced continuous raids from Germanic tribes and internal troubles with the rebellion of Faustinus, a provincial governor.

Tetricus ordered his troops to leave the Rhine and march southward, where they met the Roman army in the fields somewhere near Châlons (as is now conjectured).

== Battle ==
Aurelian's army was better trained and well commanded, and when Tetricus was captured in the midst of the fighting, the Gallic army disintegrated and was torn apart by Aurelian's troops. The battle was remembered for years for its high death toll.

== Aftermath ==
The costly battle made it much harder for Aurelian to defend the Rhine area. In the years to come, Alamanni and Franks invaded, taking forts and destroying cities.

Tetricus and his son were taken to Rome and paraded in a triumph. Tetricus was spared further punishment; instead, Aurelian made him a Roman administrator, a corrector Lucaniae, overseeing the region Lucania in southern Italy.

== Historical controversies ==
Historians dispute whether Tetricus actually wished to fight in the Catalaunian Plains. Various older accounts portray him as unhappy with his position as Gallic emperor. According to these, Tetricus deliberately placed his army in a disadvantageous situation and deserted at the outset of the battle, having previously arranged the elaborate treachery with Aurelian. However, modern historians have demurred, considering the story of the disloyalty of Tetricus to his own forces to be propaganda fomented by Aurelian. In the battle, Aurelian suffered heavy casualties to his army, which it is argued that he could have avoided simply by having Tetricus surrender. The empire was also in desperate need of manpower to protect Gaul from the barbarian incursions, and the slaughter of the battle left the Rhine frontier dangerously defenseless and exposed to the invasions of Franks and Alemanni.

The narrative of the 18th-century historian Edward Gibbon appears to answer these objections: he states that the Gallic army revered the memory of Postumus and would have deposed or killed Tetricus if he had tried to surrender the empire of Postumus without a fight; further, Aurelian could not trust the rebellious army to submit to him permanently unless he broke its spirit with a military defeat.

Another controversy concerns the date of the battle. Although the vast majority of ancient and modern historians place it in 273, or 274, after the fall of Zenobia, Gibbon dates it before that (in 270 or 271) on the basis of a letter from Aurelian given in the Augustan History, which implies that Firmus, suppressed in 274, was the last of the usurpers.
