= Gaius Pius Esuvius Tetricus =

Gaius Pius Esuvius Tetricus (also Caius) may refer to:

- Tetricus I, Emperor of the Gallic Empire from 270/271 to 273
- Tetricus II, son of Tetricus I
