= Consul (Gallic Empire) =

Consuls of the Gallic Empire

The office of Consul was an honorary title in the Gallic Empire, as an indigenous version of the Roman Consuls.

== History ==
After the Gallic Empire declared independence from the Roman Empire, it no longer recognized the Roman Consuls appointed by the Roman Emperor. Although the office had become entirely ceremonial, the Romans relied upon the consulship in order to date its years, which led the Gallic Empire to establish their own consuls. The office was often held by the Gallic Emperors themselves, a practice which was also copied from the Roman Empire. In the 14 years that the Gallic consulship existed, Postumus held it five times, Victorinus held it two times, Tetricus I held it three times, and Tetricus II held it once. Laelianus, Marius, and Domitianus II never held it, due to the extreme brevity of their reigns.

== List of Gallic Consuls ==
Year	Consul	Consul
260	Postumus (second time)	Honoratianus
261	Postumus (third time)	unknown
262	unknown	unknown
263	unknown	unknown
264	unknown	unknown
265	Postumus (fourth time)	unknown
266	Postumus (fourth time)	unknown
267	unknown	unknown
268	Postumus (fifth time)	Victorinus (first time)
269	unknown	unknown
270	Victorinus (second time)	Sanctus
271	Tetricus (first time)	unknown
272	Tetricus (second time)	unknown
273	Tetricus (third time)	unknown
274	Tetricus (fourth time)	Tetricus II
Date and sequence unknown:
?	Censor (twice)	Lepidus (twice)
?	Dialis	Bassus
?	Apr(ilus?)"	"Ruf(inus?)"
