= Postumus the Younger =

Possible 3rd century Roman imperial usurper

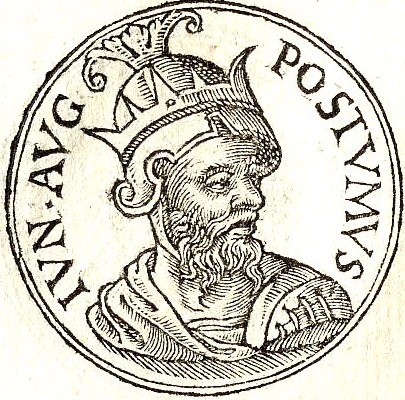
Postumus the Younger from Guillaume Rouillé's Promptuarii Iconum Insigniorum

In the Historia Augusta, Postumus the Younger (Latin: Postumus Iūnior) figures as one of the so-called Thirty Tyrants who usurped power against the Roman Emperor Gallienus. According to the pseudo-historical list of 'Thirty Tyrants', the Emperor of the Gallic Empire Postumus had a son, also called Postumus, whom he nominated to be first caesar, and later even augustus and co-ruler. Postumus the Younger would have been killed together with his father in 268, during the rebellion of Laelianus (called Lollianus in the Historia).

The historian J. F. Drinkwater dismisses the Historia Augusta's reference to Postumus the Younger as a "fiction". There are no references to any son of Postumus on coins or inscriptions from the period. However, Mionnet gives the heads represented on the reverse of some coins of Postumus senior as of Postumus junior.

The author(s) of the Historia asserts that Postumus the Younger was a skilled rhetor, and that his Controversiae were included among Quintilian's Declamationes.
