= Tetricus I =

Gallic emperor from 271 to 274 AD

- Emperor of the Gallic Empire
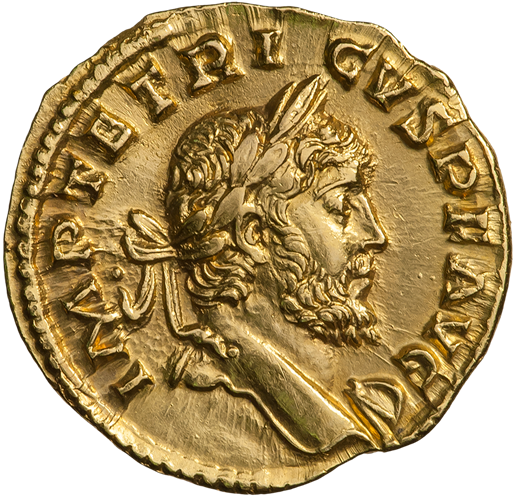
- The obverse of an aureus featuring Tetricus I. Caption: IMP. TETRICVS P. F. AVG.

Emperor of the Gallic Empire
- Reign: 271–274 AD
- Predecessor: Victorinus
- Successor: None (Gallic Empire reconquered by Aurelian) or Faustinus?
- Born: Gaul
- Died: Lucania, Italia
- Issue: Tetricus II
Names
- Gaius Pius Esuvius Tetricus

Gaius Pius Esuvius Tetricus was a Gallo-Roman nobleman who ruled as emperor of the Gallic Empire from 271 to 274 AD. He was originally the praeses (provincial governor) of Gallia Aquitania and became emperor after the murder of Emperor Victorinus in 271, with the support of Victorinus's mother, Victoria. During his reign, he faced external pressure from Germanic raiders, who pillaged the eastern and northern parts of his empire, and the Roman Empire, from which the Gallic Empire had seceded. He also faced increasing internal pressure, which led him to declare his son, Tetricus II, caesar in 273 and possibly co-emperor in 274, although this is debated. The Roman emperor Aurelian invaded in 273 or 274, leading to the Battle of Châlons, at which Tetricus surrendered. Whether this capitulation was the result of a secret agreement between Tetricus and Aurelian or that surrender was necessary after his defeat is debated. Aurelian spared Tetricus, and made him a senator and the corrector (governor) of Lucania et Bruttium. Tetricus died of natural causes a few years after 274.

== Historiography ==
The primary sources for the Gallic Empire are substandard. According to numismatist Jerome Mairat, the most reliable contemporary sources of the Gallic Empire, are Aurelius Victor and Eutropius, although they are brief and believed to rely upon the hypothetical lost Enmannsche Kaisergeschichte. Historians Nicholson and Casey second this, describing a key source of information as being "brief notices by late 4th-century Latin authors who depended for much of their information on the lost Kaisergeschichte (Enmann's History of the Emperors)". Mairat states that Zosimus and Zonaras both reveal key information regarding the Gallic Empire in short sentences, relying upon the mostly lost works of Dexippus; Nicholson and Casey state more specifically that another main source for Tetricus, in particular, is "scattered allusions" from Zosimus' first book. Nicholson and Casey further posit another source as being "information gleaned from the rather copious coinage minted by the Gallic emperors". Lastly, Mairat states that the imperial biographies of the semi-fictional Historia Augusta provide a wealth of details regarding the Gallic Empire, with Tetricus being listed as one of the "Thirty Tyrants" within; however, this work is generally unreliable, with Nicholson and Casey stating that it the biographies "interweave fact, invention, and an idiosyncratic sense of humour." For instance, the Historia Augusta states that Tetricus was recognized in Hispania, but modern historians have rejected this.

According to historian John F. Drinkwater, Victor and Eutropius, who form the traditionalist view, cast Tetricus as being a "civilian" rather than a "soldier-emperor", therefore arguing he was not prepared to rule during a time of emergency, explaining why he was originally posted to Gallia Aquitania during his time as governor, rather than the Rhine. Eutropius states that Tetricus had to suppress rebellion when he first became emperor, which Mairat identifies with the usurper Domitian II, noting that Zosimus provides only that he rose to power at the beginning of Aurelian's reign, without providing the area of his rule, but that two coins minted in his name that have been discovered were doubtlessly made in the Gallic mints between 269-274, with the specifics of the coin suggesting a dating of c. mid 271. Mairat then suggests that Domitian's usurpation may have been an uprising of the army, based in the same areas as the mint, against Tetricus due to his civilian origin. However, Drinkwater argues the possibility that this "civilian" tradition is influenced by Emperor Aurelian's propaganda and notes that Victoria put forth significant funds to see him made emperor to secure her own position and that Aquitania was a significant province, bordered on all sides by areas (Gallia Narbonensis and Hispania) which were threatened, or had recently been re-conquered by Rome. Drinkwater goes on to state that such a position "must have required considerable ability, both administrative and military", arguing that he proved himself an able commander against the Germans, and concluding that "The last Gallic emperor should not be dismissed as a lightweight".

Epigraphic sources also provide some information: however, the epigraphic habit (the use of monumental inscriptions for public display) of the Roman Empire was in decline during the period, and many are undated. Fourteen inscriptions bearing Tetricus' name have been found in Gaul, although these are broken into two regions by a vertical line of inscriptions bearing Aurelian's name, which were made after the surrender of Tetricus; no Tetrican inscriptions overlap with Aurelianic inscriptions. There are another five inscriptions bearing his name that have been discovered in Britannia.

== Background ==
The Gallic Empire was a state composed of the Roman provinces which made up Britannia, Hispania, Gaul, and Roman Germania, which broke away from the Roman Empire during the reign of Emperor Gallienus. Gallienus had become emperor after his father, Emperor Valerian, was captured by the Sassanids in 260. Gallienus's rule occurred during the Crisis of the Third Century (235–284), a period of intense political and military power struggles. Gallienus was overwhelmed by numerous issues, including several usurpers, as well as attacks in the Balkans and along the Rhine by various tribes. Hispania was also impacted, with raids from the Franks, with historian Lukas De Blois describing the raids against Hispania Baetica as "grievous", and the city of Tarraco (modern-day Tarragona) being sacked in the 260s, As a result of the threat to the empire, certain governors were appointed as dux (leader) of an entire border line, including Postumus in 258-259. Because Gallienus was unable to prevent the raids, Postumus rose up and declared himself emperor; at about the same time, he assassinated Saloninus, Gallenius's son and co-emperor, in Colonia (modern-day Cologne). Postumus focused on defending the Gallic Empire, and, in the words of the 4th-century Roman historian Eutropius, "restored the almost exhausted provinces through his enormous vigour and moderation."

Gallienus attempted to invade the Gallic Empire twice, in 260 and 265, but was repulsed both times, forcing him to accept the secession. Although he was unable to conquer the Gallic Empire, Gallienus did ensure that the Roman Empire was defended; he stationed Aureolus, a military commander, in northern Italia, to prevent Postumus from crossing the Alps. Postumus was killed by his soldiers in 269 in Mogontiacum (modern-day Mainz) while putting down a revolt by the usurper Laelianus, because he would not permit them to sack the city. After the army killed Postumus, they elected Marcus Aurelius Marius, an officer, as Gallic emperor. While some Roman historians, such as the 4th-century historians Aurelius Victor and Eutropius, hold that Marius reigned for only two days before being killed by Victorinus, who had served as praetorian prefect (commander of his praetorian guard) under Postumus, the number of coins issued by Marius indicate that he must have served for a longer time, a period of roughly three months. Victorinus declared himself emperor in mid-269 in Augusta Treverorum (modern-day Trier), two days after killing Marius. Victorinus's rule was recognized by the provinces of Britannia and Gaul, but not by those of Hispania.

== Life ==
=== Rise to power ===
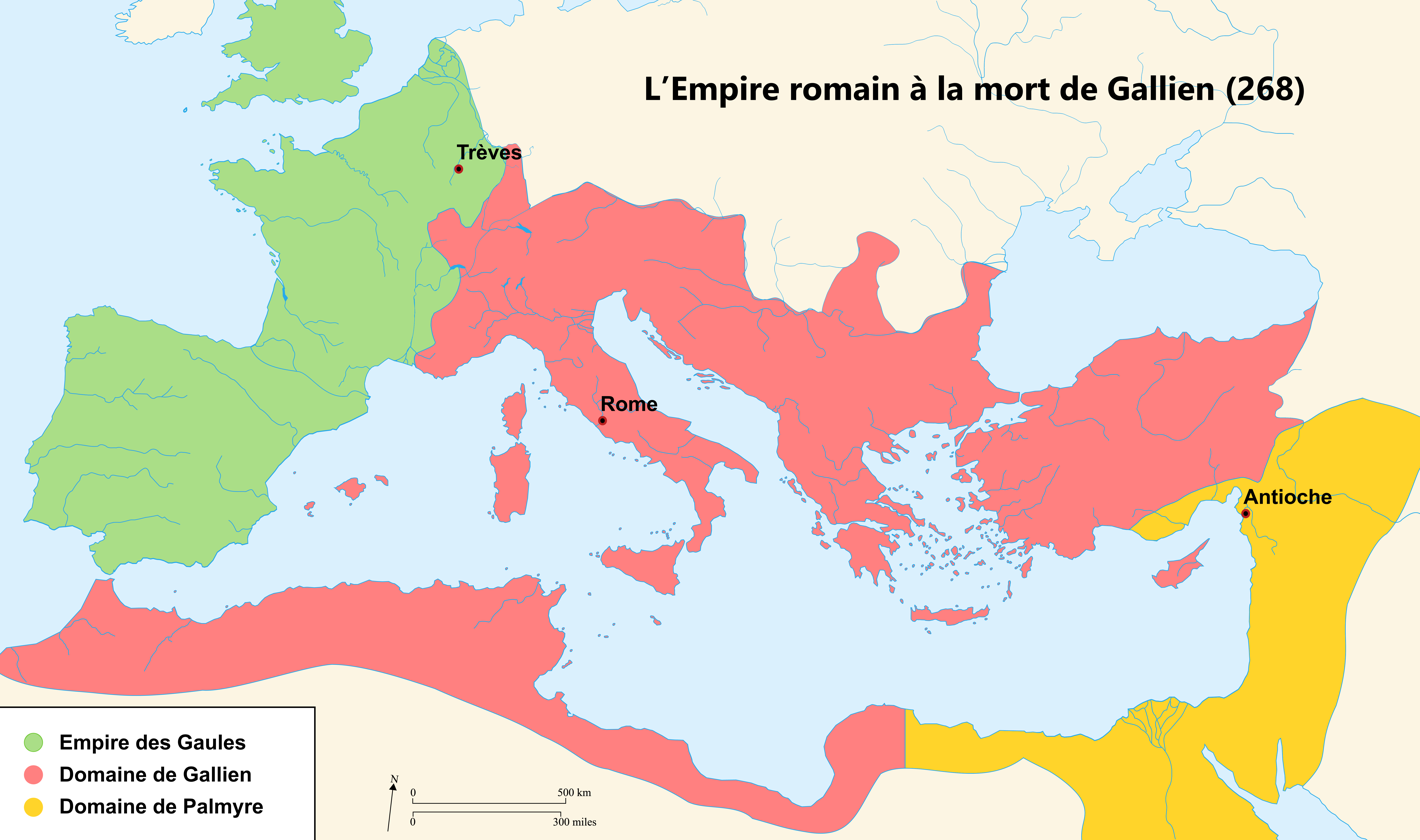
A 268 AD map, showing the Gallic Empire in (green, top left), the Roman Empire in (red, middle), and the Palmyrene Empire in (yellow, bottom right)

A map of the Gallic Empire (green, top left), Roman Empire (red, middle and far left), and Palmyrene Empire (yellow, bottom right), during the reign of Tetricus I

Gaius Pius Esuvius Tetricus, commonly referred to as Tetricus I, was born in Gaul, on an unknown date, to a noble family of Gallic origin. (Note: Drinkwater does not hold to the view that Tetricus was necessarily Gallic in origin, starting that "whether Roman or Gallic is difficult to judge".) Little of his early life is known, however, he had become a senator and occupied the post of praeses provinciae (provincial governor) of Gallia Aquitania, a province in the southwest of what is now France, by 271. In early 271, emperor Victorinus was murdered in Colonia by Attitianus, an officer in the Gallic army, allegedly because he had seduced Attitianus's wife. (Note: Some sources give the date as 270, and the end of his reign as 273.) Because the motivation for his assassination was personal, rather than political, Victorinus's mother, Victoria, was able to retain power within the empire; as Drinkwater notes, she was unable to take the throne herself as a woman, and thus selected Tetricus as a candidate, having him appointed by the army after securing their support with large bribes; he further mentions the possibility that Tetricus was related to Victoria and Victorinus, but states that there is no direct support for this. The army proclaimed Tetricus as Gallic emperor in spring of the same year at Burdigala (modern-day Bordeaux). However, Tetricus was not present for the proclamation.

Drinkwater posits that, as he was governor of Gallia Aquitania, Victoria likely reigned for several weeks from Colonia before Tetricus assumed power, possibly issuing coins deifying Victorinus during this period. Mairat argues that, if Tetricus was absent for the proclamation, it is most likely that Victoria did order the minting of the coins, but notes that the coins of Domitian II appear to have been made in the same issue, noting that the coinage may have been created by the Gallic armies, due to political uncertainty regarding succession, or that Victoria may have minted coins in Victorinus' name, rather than Tetricus', for the same reason.

The Gallic Empire mirrored the Roman imperial administrative traditions, and as such each Gallic emperor adopted a Roman regnal title upon his accession; after becoming emperor, Tetricus adopted the regnal name and titles of Imperator Caesar Esuvius Tetricus Pius Felix Invictus Augustus Pontifex Maximus. The Gallic Empire also followed the Roman tradition of emperors appointing themselves as consul, with Tetricus appointing himself as consul in 271, 272, 273, and 274. By Roman custom, there were two consuls per year; however, the names of the other consuls for 271–273 are not known, but it is known that Tetricus's son, Tetricus II, served as his colleague in 274. Tetricus was also tribune from 271 to 274. Tetricus elevated Tetricus II as caesar in 273 (Note: An inscription in Baeterrae (modern-day Béziers) associates Tetricus II with Tetricus' second tribunician period, moving the date back to 272, however this may be the result of a mason's error.) to increase the legitimacy of his reign by founding a dynasty; he may have also elevated his son to co-emperor during the last days of his reign, but this is uncertain. The semi-fictional Historia Augusta, in its biography of emperor Aurelian, states that Tetricus elevated his son at an unspecified date, however, neither Aurelius Victor nor Eutropius mentions such an event.

=== Reign ===
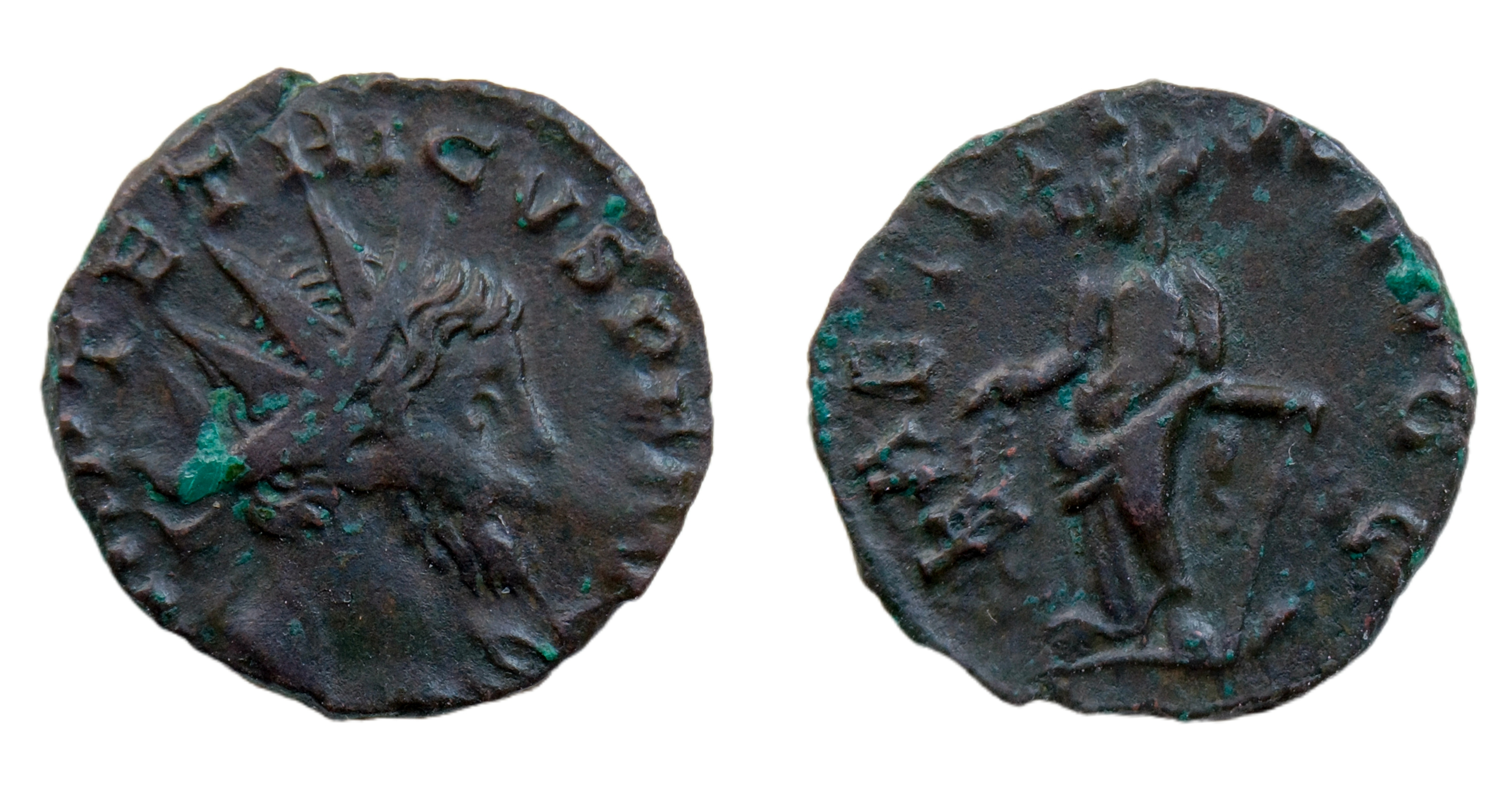
Antoninianus of Tetricus I.

During Tetricus's reign, the main threats to the Gallic Empire came from the Roman Empire and Germanic peoples. Tetricus also had to contend with dissent within the army and government. Tetricus was recognized as emperor by all of Gaul — except Gallia Narbonensis, which had been partially reconquered by Placidianus, a general under Roman emperor Claudius Gothicus — and Britannia. He was not recognized by the provinces of Hispania, including Hispania Baetica, Lusitania, and Hispania Tarraconensis, which had earlier refused to recognize Victorinus as emperor, nor by the city of Argentoratum (modern-day Strasbourg) in Germania. The provinces that did not recognize Tetricus chose instead to recognize Aurelian as Roman emperor, who had been proclaimed emperor in September 270 at Sirmium in Pannonia. By the time of Tetricus's rule, the Germanic peoples had become increasingly aggressive, launching raids across the Rhine and along the coast. Tetricus moved the capital of the Gallic Empire from Colonia to Augusta Treverorum in late 271 in order to guard against the Germanic peoples. Tetricus attacked them with some success, mainly during the early part of his reign, celebrating a triumph for one of his victories. Later in his reign, he was forced to withdraw troops and abandon forts, which allowed the border territories to be pillaged. Later Germanic raids were met with almost no opposition — one penetrated so far into Gallic territory that it reached the Loire. While Aurelian was focused on attacking the Palmyrene Empire, which had broken away from the Roman Empire in 270 under its queen, Zenobia, Tetricus was able to recover Gallia Narbonensis and southeastern parts of Gallia Aquitania. During 273–274, Faustinus, provincial governor of Gallia Belgica, rebelled against Tetricus, however, his revolt was swiftly crushed. Around this time, Tetricus also held the quinquennalia, public games that took place every four years.

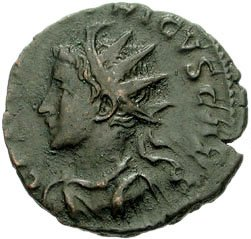
Antoninianus of Tetricus II

=== Defeat and later life ===
After Aurelian had succeeded in his reconquest of the Palmyrene Empire, he turned his attention to the Gallic Empire, beginning preparations for an invasion in 273. In early 274, Aurelian began to march into northern Gaul, while Tetricus led his troops southward from Augusta Treverorum to meet him. The armies of Aurelian and Tetricus met in February or March 274 at the Battle of Châlons, near modern-day Châlons in north-eastern France. The higher discipline of the Roman forces, coupled with the greater military command of Aurelian, tipped the harsh battle in Roman favor, and after Tetricus was captured in the combat, the morale of the Gallic forces broke. The army of Tetricus was soundly defeated, and Tetricus surrendered either directly after his defeat or later; the latest possible date for his surrender was March 274, when the Gallic mints switched from minting coins of Tetricus I and II to those of Aurelian. Some Roman sources including Aurelius Victor, Eutropius, the Historia Augusta, and Orosius report that Tetricus had already made a deal with Aurelian, offering to surrender in exchange for an honourable defeat and no punishment, quoting the ghost of Palinurus from Virgil's Aeneid 6.365: eripe me his, invicte, malis ('pluck me out, O undefeated one, from these troubles'). However, this is believed by modern historians to be a product of Roman imperial propaganda; Aurelian, who was attempting to stabilise his fragile empire, benefited from the account that Tetricus had planned to betray his army, as his troops would then be less likely to rise up again.

Upon Tetricus's surrender, the Gallic Empire rejoined the Roman Empire, once more restored to its former borders, and Aurelian held a triumph in Rome involving many chariots; twenty elephants; two hundred beasts, including tigers, giraffes, and elk; eight hundred gladiators; and prisoners from various barbarian peoples. The leaders of the two secessionist states, Tetricus of the Gallic Empire and Zenobia of the Palmyrene Empire, were paraded during this triumph, along with Tetricus II; Tetricus and his son were not placed in chains for their march, but instead were made to wear braccae (Gallic trousers). Aurelian pardoned all three of them and made Tetricus a senator and corrector (governor) of either Lucania et Bruttium, a region of southern Italy, or all of Italy. The Historia Augusta states that he was made corrector Lucaniae (governor of Lucania) in the biography of Tetricus, but states that he was made corrector totius Italiae (governor of Italy) in the biography of Aurelian. Epigraphic evidence exists for correctores totius Italiae who predate Tetricus, whereas the first epigraphic evidence for a corrector of a smaller region comes from around 283, ten years after Aurelian appointed Tetricus as corrector. Because of the contradictions within the Historia Augusta, the opinion of modern scholars is divided. In 1921, David Magie, the editor of the Loeb edition of the Historia Augusta, favored Tetricus's having been made corrector totius Italiae, while others, such as Alaric Watson in his 1999 Aurelian and the Third Century, support his having been made corrector Lucaniae. Tetricus died of natural causes several years later in Italia.

== Numismatics ==
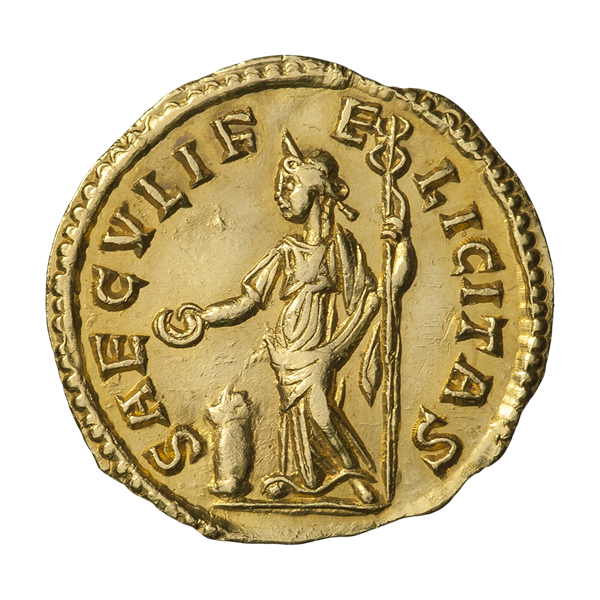
Reverse of an aureus bearing the image of a standing Felicitas

The gold aurei issued during the reign of Tetricus fall into several types. Seven surviving coins feature his image on the obverse, with the reverses showing him riding a horse, him holding an olive branch and a scepter, as well as various depictions of deities standing, including: Aequitas, Jupiter, Laetitia, Pax, Fides, and Spes. One features his face on the obverse and a standing Hilaritas on the reverse. Another displays his head on the obverse and a depiction of the Roman goddess Victoria walking to the right on the reverse. There are two aureus types that depicted Tetricus I and Tetricus II together; both feature jugate (side-by-side) images of them on the obverse, with one having a standing Aeternitas on the reverse and the other having a standing Felicitas. A rare quinarius (a silver coin) issued during his reign has a three-quarter facing image of Tetricus on the obverse and Victoria standing with her foot on a globe on the reverse.

Most of the coins minted during Tetricus's reign were of low quality; his antoninianus contained so little silver content that imitations were easy to make, leading to the market being flooded with fakes, called barbarous radiates.

The coinage of the Gallic Empire does not give any evidence of public games or festivals, as was common in the Roman Empire, although it is believed that similar games and festivals were held. There are a number of issues of coins in which the emperor's head faces left, rather than the usual right, which historians Oliver Nicholson and P. J. Casey state may have been donatives granted to soldiers upon the emperor's accession or consulship, in line with the expectations of the time.
