= Victoria (Gallic Empire) =

Late 3rd century leader of the Gallic Empire

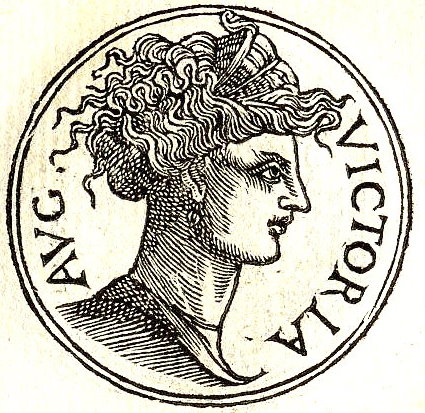
Imaginary portrait of Victoria from Guillaume Rouillé's Promptuarii Iconum Insigniorum (1553)

Victoria (c. 231 – c. 271), also known as Vitruvia, was a leader in the Roman breakaway realm known as the Gallic Empire in the late 3rd century. She was the mother of Victorinus, who ruled as Gallic emperor until his assassination in 271. Afterwards, Victoria used her authority to stabilize the empire and select a successor.

== History ==
Victoria is mentioned in Aurelius Victor's Liber de Caesaribus, and in the account of the Thirty Tyrants in the unreliable Historia Augusta. Nothing is known of her early life, though she must have been from a wealthy and distinguished Gallic family, which produced the emperor Victorinus, her son. According to Aurelius Victor, after Victorinus was killed in a mutiny, Victoria stepped in, using her copious resources to buy the support of the legions. Thus she assured the ascension of her chosen candidate for emperor, Tetricus I, who was formerly the governor of Gallia Aquitania and speculated to be related to her. She also gave the title of Caesar to his son, Tetricus the Younger. The Historia Augusta, which counts her as one of Rome's "Thirty Tyrants", adds additional details, claiming that Victoria initially made Victorinus' otherwise unattested son, Victorinus Junior, emperor, but that he too was killed, soon after his father. The Historia also says that she herself bore the titles Mater Castrorum ("Mother of the Camp") and Augusta and minted her own coins. She died shortly after Tetricus' ascension either by murder or natural causes. However, given the Historia's notorious unreliability, the veracity of these elements is doubtful.

== Relationship with Zenobia ==
Victoria has been called the Heroine or Empress of the West alongside Zenobia, a contemporary female ruler and the empress of the eastern division of the Roman Empire. Zenobia once sent ambassadors to Victoria, to suggest attacking Rome from the east and west, but Victoria refused.

== See also ==
- Women in ancient Rome
- List of Roman women
