= Gallic Empire =

Breakaway state of the Roman Empire (260–274)

- 260–274
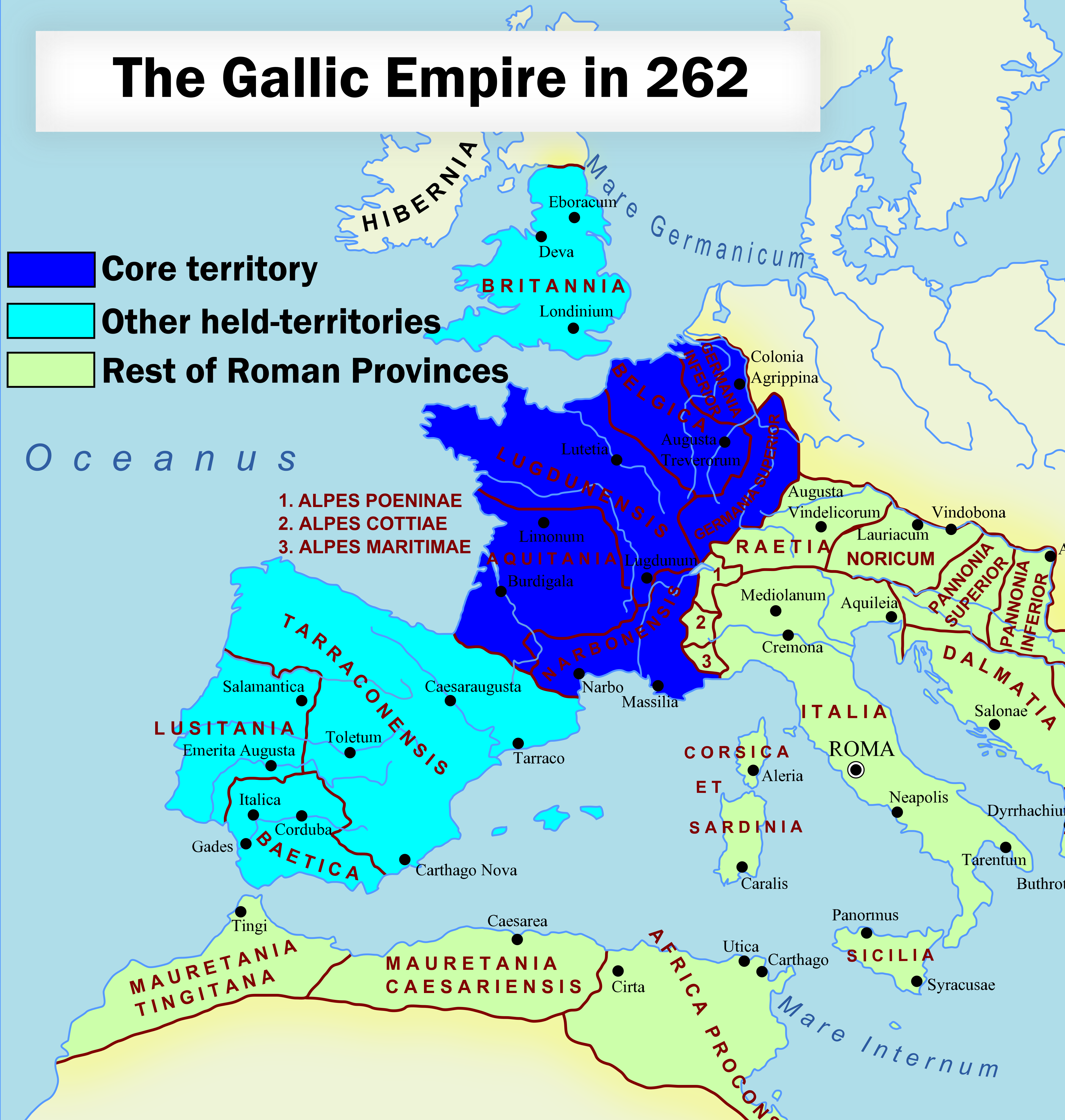
- The Gallic Empire under Postumus by 262 (in blue), with the Roman Empire
- Capital: Colonia Agrippina (Cologne) (260–271); Augusta Treverorum (Trier) (271–274)
- Common languages: Latin (official); Regional/local languages
- Government: Autocracy
- Emperor
  - 260–269: Postumus
  - 269: Marius
  - 269–270: Victorinus
  - 270–274: Tetricus I
- Historical era: Late Antiquity
  - Established: 260
  - Battle of Châlons: 274
Preceded by	Succeeded by
Roman Empire	Roman Empire

Gallic Empire (Note: The regime had no distinct name or style that has survived on official monuments, inscriptions or coins; its titles and administrative structures followed the models of the central Roman government. Occasionally modern historians use the Latin phrase Imperium Galliarum to refer to the state, derived from a passage in Eutropius: Victorinus postea Galliarum accepit imperium, "Victorinus took command of the Gallic provinces".) or Gallic Roman Empire are names used in modern historiography for a breakaway Western European part of the Roman Empire that functioned de facto as a separate state from 260 to 274. (Note: The year of Postumus' accession was either 259 or 260. The year 259 was once favoured; however, most modern scholars consider that the summer or fall of 260 is more likely when Postumus was hailed emperor. The exact dating depends on several factors, including when the emperor Valerian was captured and disgraced. Other dates cited here must be pushed back by one year if 259 is accepted as the year of Postumus' accession.) It originated during the Crisis of the Third Century, when a series of Roman military leaders and aristocrats declared themselves emperors and took control of Gaul and adjacent provinces without attempting to conquer Italy or otherwise seize the central Roman administrative apparatus.

The Gallic Empire was established by Postumus in 260 in the wake of barbarian invasions and instability in Rome, and at its height included the territories of Germania, Gaul, Britannia, and Hispania. After Postumus' assassination in 269, it lost much of its territory but continued under several emperors and usurpers. It was retaken by Roman Emperor Aurelian after the Battle of Châlons in 274.

== History ==
=== Origins ===
The Roman Crisis of the Third Century continued as Emperor Valerian was defeated and captured by the Sasanian Empire in the Battle of Edessa, together with a large part of the Roman field army in the east. This left his son Gallienus in very shaky control. Shortly thereafter, King Odaenathus gained control of a wide swath of the east, including Egypt, Syria, Judea, and Arabia Petraea; while he was nominally loyal to the Roman government, his domain was de facto independent and has come to be referred to as the Palmyrene Empire.

The governors in Pannonia staged unsuccessful local revolts. Gallienus left for the Danube to attend to their disruption. This left Postumus, who was governor of Germania Superior and Inferior, in charge at the Rhine border. An exceptional administrator, Postumus had also ably protected Germania Inferior against an invasion led by the Franks in the summer of 260. In fact, Postumus defeated the Frankish forces at Empel so decisively that there were no further Germanic raids for ten years. This all combined to make Postumus one of the most powerful men in the western reaches of the Roman Empire.

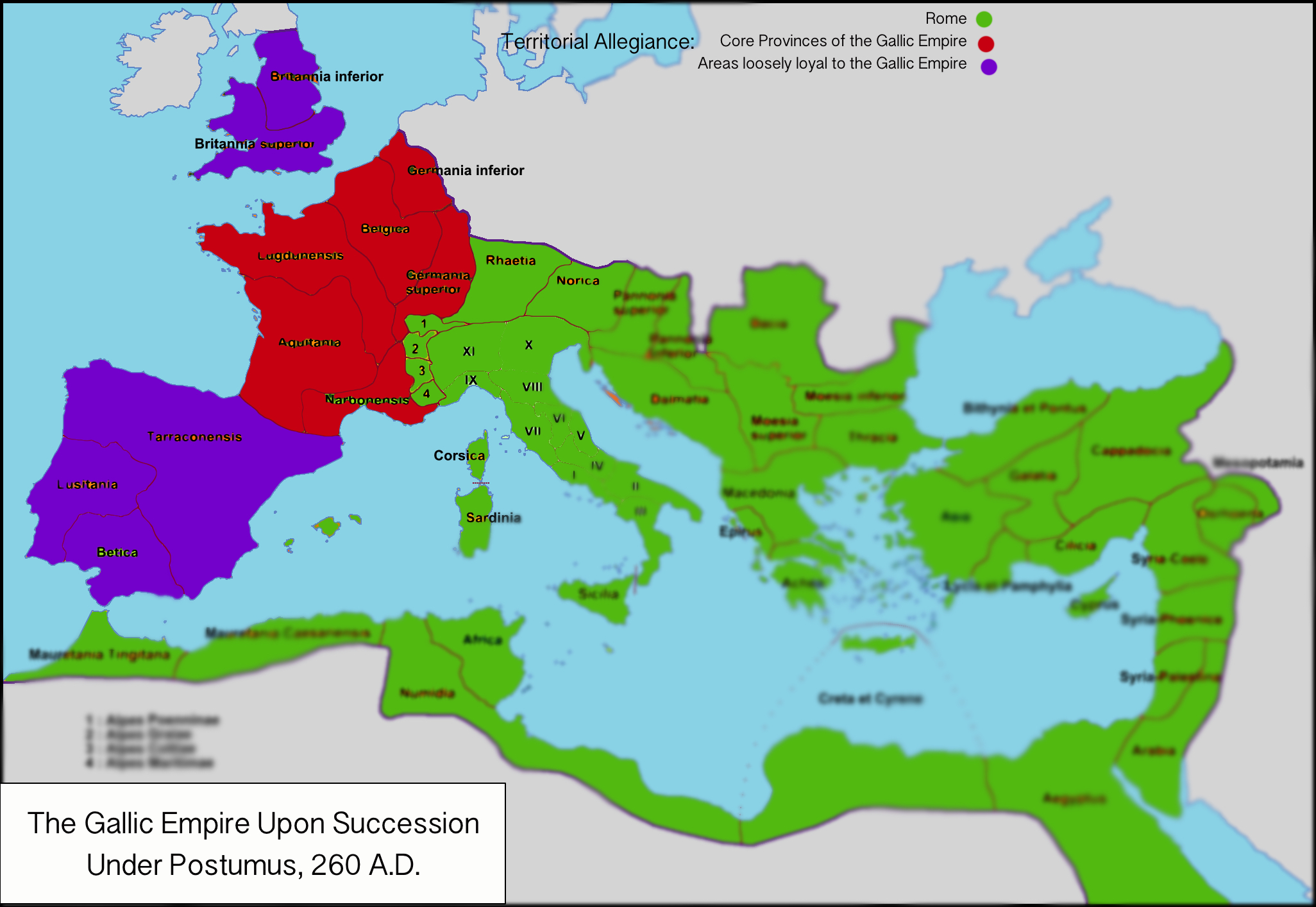
The Gallic Empire at its greatest territorial extent, after its creation by Postumus in 260

Gallienus's son Saloninus and the praetorian prefect Silvanus remained at Colonia Agrippina to keep the young heir out of danger and perhaps also as a check on Postumus' ambitions. In 260 Postumus besieged Colonia Agrippina and put Saloninus and Silvanus to death, making his revolt official. Postumus is thought to have established his capital there or at Augusta Treverorum. Lugdunum was one of the most important cities in the area under his control.

Postumus did not make any effort to extend his control into Italy or to depose Gallienus. Instead, he established parallel institutions modelled on the Roman Empire's central government: his regime had its own Praetorian Guard, two annually elected consuls (not all of the names have survived), and probably its own senate. According to the numismatic evidence, Postumus held the office of consul five times.

Postumus successfully fended off a military incursion by Gallienus in 263 and was never challenged by him again. However, in early 269 he was challenged by Laelianus, who was probably one of his own commanders. Laelianus was declared emperor at Mogontiacum by his Legio XXII Primigenia. In response, Postumus quickly retook Mogontiacum, and Laelianus was killed. In the aftermath of the battle, however, Postumus was overthrown and killed by his own troops, reportedly because he did not allow them to sack the city.

=== After Postumus ===
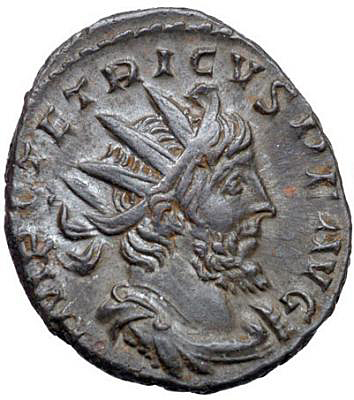
Coin of Tetricus, last emperor (271–274) of the Gallic Empire

An officer in Postumus' army, Marcus Aurelius Marius, was installed as emperor upon Postumus's death, but he died very shortly after; ancient sources writing much later state that he reigned only two days, though it is more likely, based on the numismatic record, that he reigned for a few months. Subsequently, the tribune of the praetorians Marcus Piavonius Victorinus came to power, being recognized as emperor in northern Gaul and Britannia but not in Hispania. Meanwhile, Gallienus had been killed in a coup in 268, and his successor in the central Roman provinces, Claudius Gothicus, re-established Roman authority in Gallia Narbonensis and parts of Gallia Aquitania; there is some evidence that the provinces of Hispania, which did not recognize Postumus's successors in Gaul, may have realigned with Rome then.

Victorinus spent most of his reign dealing with insurgencies and attempting to recover the Gaulish territories taken by Claudius. He was assassinated in 271, but his mother Victoria took control of his troops and used her power to influence the selection of his successor. With Victoria's support, the governor of Gallia Aquitania, Gaius Pius Esuvius Tetricus was made emperor and was recognized in Britannia and the parts of Gaul that had recognized Victorinus. Tetricus fought off Germanic barbarians who had begun ravaging Gaul after the death of Victorinus and was able to re-take Gallia Aquitania and western Gallia Narbonensis while Claudius' successor Aurelian was in the east fighting the Palmyrene Empire, which was in open revolt against Roman authority under Queen Zenobia. Tetricus established the imperial court at Trier, and in 273 he elevated his son Tetricus II to the rank of caesar.

The following year Tetricus II was made co-consul with his father, but the area under their control grew weak from internal strife, including a mutiny led by the usurper Faustinus. By that time Aurelian had defeated the Palmyrene Empire and had made plans to reconquer the west. He moved into Gaul and defeated Tetricus at the Battle of Châlons in 274. According to some sources, Tetricus offered to surrender in exchange for clemency for him and his son before the battle. This detail may be later propaganda, but either way Aurelian was victorious, and the Gallic Empire was effectively ended. In contrast with his propaganda after the recent defeat of Zenobia, Aurelian did not present his recapture of Gaul as a victory over a foreign enemy, and indeed many officials who had served in the army and administration of the Gallic Empire continued their careers, including Tetricus, who was appointed to an administrative post in Italy.

== Causes ==
The Gallic Empire was symptomatic of the fragmentation of power during the third-century crisis. It has also been taken to represent autonomous trends in the western provinces, including proto-feudalistic tendencies among the Gaulish land-owning class whose support has sometimes been thought to have underpinned the strength of the Gallic Empire, and an interplay between the strength of Roman institutions and the growing importance of provincial concerns.

One of Postumus' primary objectives as emperor was evidently the defense of the Germanic frontier. In 261, he repelled mixed groups of Franks and Alamanni to hold the Rhine limes secure (though lands beyond the upper Rhine and Danube had to be abandoned to the barbarians within a couple of years). In so doing, Postumus positioned himself avowedly as the defender and restorer of Gaul as well as the upholder of the Roman name. (Note: Gallic emperors are called adsertores Romani nominis in the Historia Augusta.)

== Emperors ==
The Gallic emperors are known primarily from the coins they minted. The political and military history of the Gallic Empire can be sketched through the careers of these emperors. Their names are as follows:

- Postumus 260–269
  - (Laelian 269, usurper)
- Marius 269
- Victorinus 268/69–271
  - (Domitian II 271?, usurper)
- Tetricus I 271–274
- Tetricus II 273–274 (son of Tetricus I; Caesar)
  - (Faustinus 273/74, usurper)

Postumus the Younger, Empress Victoria and Victorinus Junior are included as leaders in the list of the Thirty Tyrants, but there are no coins or inscriptions about them. Victorinus Junior and Postumus the Younger are both now generally considered to be fictional while Victoria’s existence was proven by the discovery of her funerary stele in 2012.

== Consuls ==
Year	Consul	Consul
260	Postumus (second time)	Honoratianus
261	Postumus (third time)	unknown
262	unknown	unknown
263	unknown	unknown
264	unknown	unknown
265	Postumus (fourth time)	unknown
266	Postumus (fourth time)	unknown
267	unknown	unknown
269	Postumus (fifth time)	Victorinus (first time)
269	unknown	unknown
270	Victorinus (second time)	Sanctus
271	Tetricus (first time)	unknown
272	Tetricus (second time)	unknown
273	Tetricus (third time)	unknown
Year and sequence unknown:
?	Censor (twice)	Lepidus (twice)
?	Dialis	Bassus
?	"Apr."	"Ruf."

== Family tree ==
Laelianus; 269

Postumus; 260–269
Postumus Junior (Fictional); 260–269

Marcus Aurelius Marius; 269

Victoria; 271
Victorinus; 268–271
Victorinus Junior (Fictional); 271

Tetricus I 271–274
Tetricus II; 271–274

== See also ==
- Roman governors of Germania Inferior
- Bagaudae
- Jublains archeological site
