= Faustinus =

3rd-century Roman governor of Gallia Belgica

- Emperor or usurper of the Gallic Empire

Emperor or usurper of the Gallic Empire
- Reign: late 273– spring 274 AD
- Predecessor: Tetricus I
- Successor: None (Gallic Empire reconquered by Aurelian)
- Born: Gaul
- Died: spring 274

Faustinus was a 3rd-century CE political figure who launched a rebellion against the Gallic Emperor Tetricus I. His full name and his year of birth are unknown. According to a small number of literary sources (Aurelius Victor, Eutropius, and Polemius Silvius), Faustinus sparked a mutiny among Tetricus' troops. At the time of his rebellion, Faustinus was a provincial governor (praeses), presumably of Gallia Belgica since the capital of that province—Augusta Treverorum—was where the rebellion began. Faustinus' revolt was formidable enough, according to the literary sources, to lead Tetricus to appeal to the central Roman emperor Aurelian for aid against the usurper.

The exact date of his rebellion is uncertain, but scholars generally agree on some time between late 273 CE and the summer of 274 CE. Some ancient sources suggest that Faustinus continued his revolt after Tetricus surrendered to Aurelian, who in this scenario would have defeated Faustinus in 274 CE.

Faustinus may have owned property in Britain that was confiscated after the failure of his rebellion.

To explain the absence of coins minted by this usurper in the empire, it has been suggested by John F. Drinkwater that Faustinus did not actually rebel against Tetricus, but was actually his successor..

== Sources ==
- Polfer, Michel (1999). "Faustinus". De Imperatoribus Romanis.
