= Postumus =

Gallic emperor from 260 to 269

- Augustus of Gaul, Hispania and Britannia
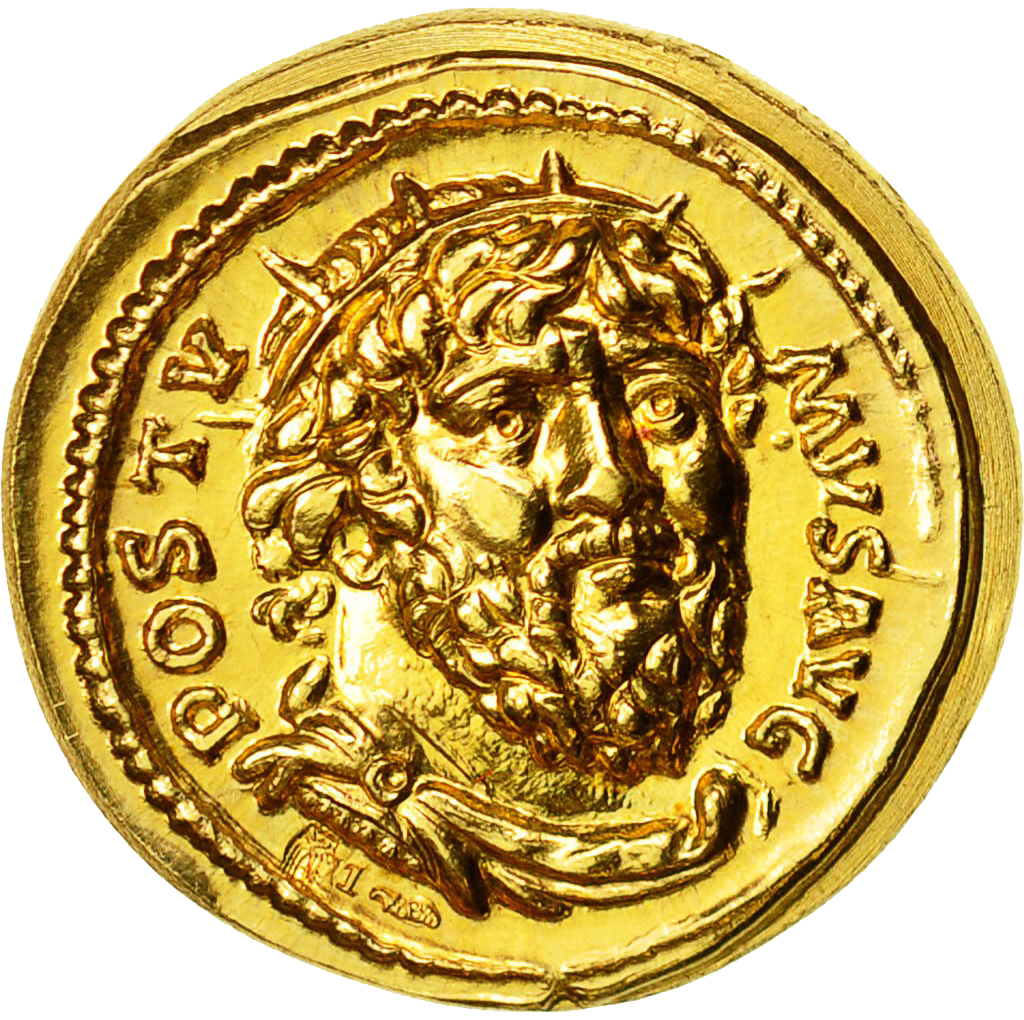
- Reproduction of a coin featuring Postumus by the Monnaie de Paris. Legend: POSTUMUS AUG(USTUS)

Emperor of the Gallic Empire
- Reign: 260–269 (Note: The year of Postumus's accession was either 259 or 260. While the year 259 has sometimes been favoured, the consensus now favours mid-/late 260 as the date that he was hailed emperor, according to Polfer (2000) and Drinkwater (1987), p. 97 The terminus ante quem is an inscription from September 260 naming Postumus as emperor: Bakker (1993), pp. 369–386. Other dates cited in this article must be pushed back one year for those who take 259 as the year of Postumus's accession. See Drinkwater (1987), pp. 95–106.)
- Predecessor: Gallienus (as ruler of the united Roman Empire)
- Successor: Marcus Aurelius Marius
- Born: Gaul
- Died: 269; Mogontiacum
- Issue: Postumus the Younger (likely fictional)
Names
- Marcus Cassianius Latinius Postumus
Regnal name
- Imperator Caesar Marcus Cassianius Latinius Postumus Pius Felix Augustus Germanicus Maximus

Marcus Cassianius Latinius Postumus (fl. 259–269) was a Roman commander of Batavian origin, who ruled as emperor of the splinter state of the Roman Empire known to modern historians as the Gallic Empire. The Roman army in Gaul threw off its allegiance to emperor Gallienus around the year 260, and Postumus assumed the title and powers of Emperor in the provinces of Gaul, Germania, Britannia, and Hispania. He ruled for the better part of ten years (Note: Based on numismatic evidence, Postumus's rule extended over ten periods of tribunician power, each conventionally lasting for one year beginning on December 10. Regardless of which year Postumus assumed the purple (259 or 260), his rule must have stretched across ten such years. See Drinkwater (1987), pp. 93–95.) before he was murdered by his own troops.

== Life ==
=== Rise to power ===
Little is known about the early life of Postumus. He has been claimed as being of Batavian origin; certainly his coinage honors deities—Hercules Magusanus and Hercules Deusoniensis—who would have been popular among the Batavians. Hercules Magusanus was probably an interpretatio romana translation of the Germanic deity Þunraz. Deusoniensis may refer to the town of Deuso, located in or near Batavian territory and likely to be identified with modern-day Diessen; it has been hypothesized that Postumus himself was born in Deuso. From these relatively obscure provincial origins, Postumus would have risen through the ranks of the army until he held command of the Roman forces "... among the Celts". What his precise title was is not definitely known, though he may plausibly have been promoted by the emperor Valerian to the position of imperial legate of Germania Inferior. Postumus was evidently in favour at court, and, according to König, was granted an honorary consulship.

By 259, Valerian was campaigning in the east against the Persians, while his son and co-emperor Gallienus was preoccupied with the situation on the Danubian frontier. Consequently, Gallienus left his son, Saloninus, and military commanders, including Postumus, to protect the Rhine. Amid the chaos of an invasion by the Alamanni and Franks, and spurred on by news of the defeat and capture of Valerian, the army in Gaul revolted and proclaimed Postumus emperor.

The trigger was their defeat in 260 of a Juthungian army which was returning from Italy laden with prisoners, even though they had been repulsed by Gallienus at Mediolanum (Milan). Under the command of Postumus and Marcus Simplicinius Genialis, the Roman army crushed the Juthungi, and Postumus proceeded to distribute the captured spoils to the legions he commanded. Saloninus, on the advice of his praetorian prefect Silvanus (who had coordinated Roman policy in Gaul alongside Postumus), demanded the transfer of the recovered booty to his residence at Colonia Claudia Ara Agrippinensium (Cologne). Postumus assembled his army and made a show of reluctantly enforcing this command, thus inviting his troops to instead throw off their allegiance to Gallienus. The troops accordingly proclaimed Postumus emperor and besieged Colonia, trapping Saloninus and Silvanus. After breaching the walls of the city, Postumus had Silvanus and Saloninus killed, although his supporters later claimed that it was the native Gauls who were responsible for the murders. Later he erected a triumphal arch to celebrate his victory.

=== Establishment of a Gallic Empire ===
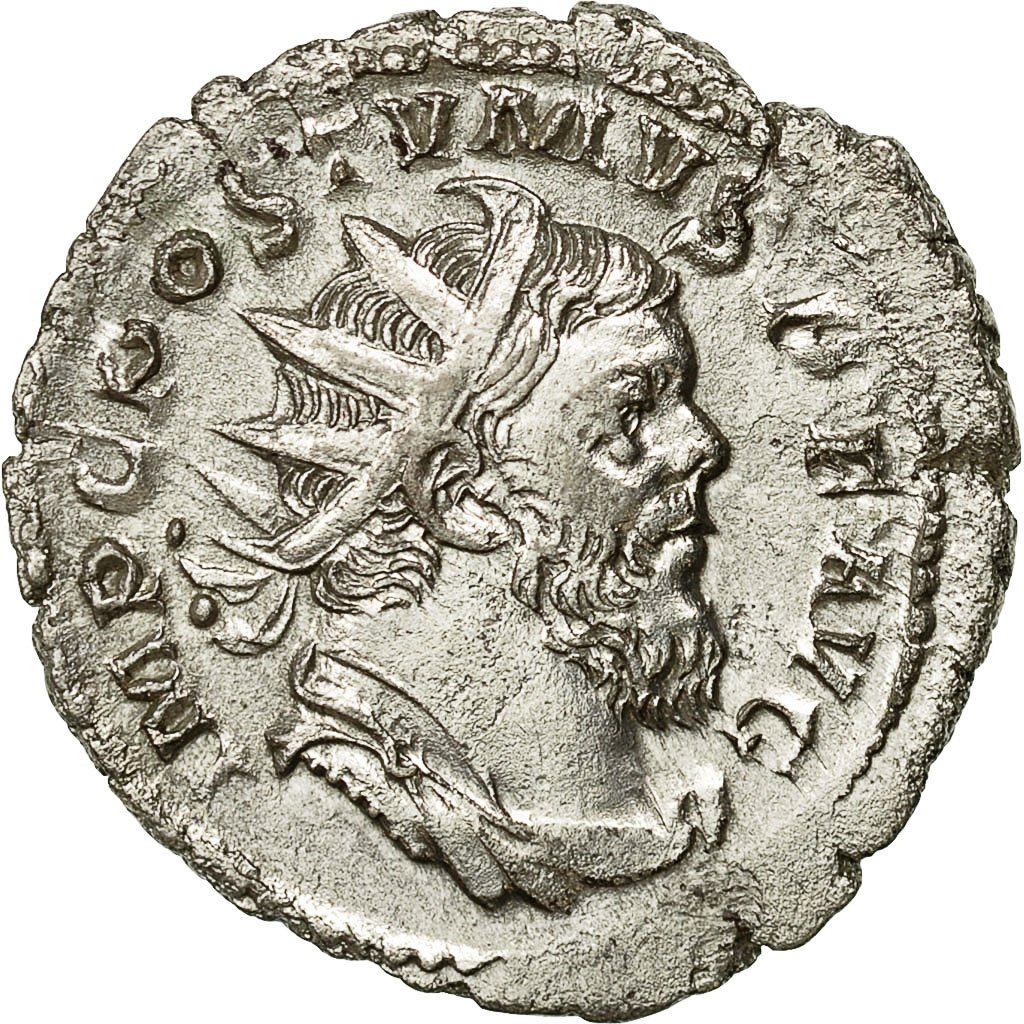
Antoninianus of Postumus: IMP. C. POSTVMVS P. F. AVG

Postumus was immediately recognized as emperor in Gaul (except perhaps for the province of Gallia Narbonensis), Germania Superior and Inferior, and Raetia. By 261, Britannia, Narbonensis and Hispania also acknowledged him as emperor, possibly after an expedition to Britain in the winter of 260–261. He established his capital in northern Gaul, probably at Colonia Claudia Ara Agrippinensium or Augusta Treverorum (Trier), and furnished his government with many of the traditional Roman legislative and executive structures. Apart from the position of emperor, he immediately assumed the office of consul alongside a colleague, Honoratianus. Like his imperial predecessors, he became the pontifex maximus of the state and assumed tribunician power each year. He is thought to have established a senate, perhaps on the basis of the Council of the Three Gauls or provincial councils, and a Pretorian Guard, one of whose officers was the future Gallic emperor Victorinus. The chief members of Postumus's administration, such as Victorinus and Tetricus, appear to have been drawn from his power base in northern Gaul, and indeed the entire administration rapidly became Gallicized.

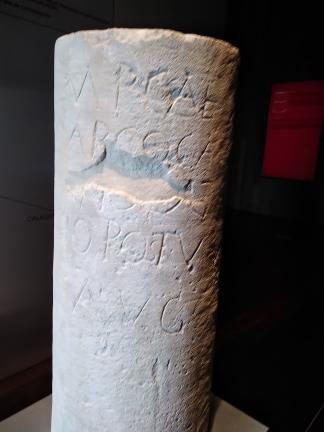
Milestone of Postumus c.261-269 found in Vitoria-Gasteiz, Spain. It bears the inscription: [I]MP(ERATORI) CAE[S(ARI)] [M]ARCO CA[SSIJANO] LAT[IN]IO POSTUMO AUG(USTO).

Postumus represented himself as the restorer of Gaul (Restitutor Galliarum) and the bringer of security to the provinces (Salus Provinciarum) on some of his coins; prior to 10 December 261, he also took the title of Germanicus maximus, a title he earned after successfully defending Gaul against the Germans. His principal objective in assuming the purple appeared to be the restoration and defence of the Rhine frontier and the surrounding area, a task that he approached with vigour, earning the admiration of the ancient authors, who declared that he restored the security that the provinces had enjoyed in the past. So successful was he in the task of stabilizing his domain that the coins issued by Postumus were of better workmanship and higher precious metal content than coins issued by Gallienus. His control of the Spanish and British mining regions was presumably crucial in this regard, as was his employment of master minters who would have come into Gaul with Gallienus. Postumus fought successful campaigns against the Franks and Alemanni in 262 and 263; following his victory over them in 263, his coin-types celebrated peaceful themes such as Felicitas Augusti for some time. After having spent much of the last four years pushing the Franks out of Gaul, Postumus then recruited Frankish troops to fight against other Franks, probably dispersed within existing Roman army units. An issue of aureus that celebrates the emperor’s aeternitas which features a triple portrait might depict his wife and two sons.

Scholars continue to debate whether Postumus originally intended to dislodge Gallienus from Rome or was content to rule only the western provinces. From the beginning of his usurpation, Postumus had made it clear that his priority was for Gaul, and that he had no immediate intentions to make a bid for Rome. Postumus's power base was Gaul and his main responsibility was the defense of the Rhine provinces. If he marched against Gallienus, then he would be exposing his heartland not only to the Germanic tribes but also potentially to any number of usurpers. Perhaps he hoped to achieve some official recognition from Gallienus; what is clear, however, is that Postumus was not overtly separatist and did not revive the 1st-century dream of an independent Galliarum imperium. (See Julius Sabinus and revolt of the Batavi.) The forms, titles, and administrative structures of Postumus's principate remained conventionally Roman.

=== Confrontation with Gallienus ===
For four years Gallienus was too distracted by Germanic invasions and other usurpers in the east to address the situation to his north and west, but in 265 he launched a campaign to defeat Postumus. His first attempt failed when Postumus managed to escape from a precarious situation due to the carelessness of Gallienus's cavalry commander Aureolus. Aureolus was punished with demotion, eventually leading him to turn against Gallienus in 267.

A second campaign, led by Gallienus himself, also seemed to have the advantage over Postumus, but while Gallienus was besieging a city in Gaul (perhaps Augusta Treverorum), he was wounded and forced to withdraw. After this, Gallienus was occupied with crises in the rest of his empire and did not confront Postumus again.

=== Final years ===
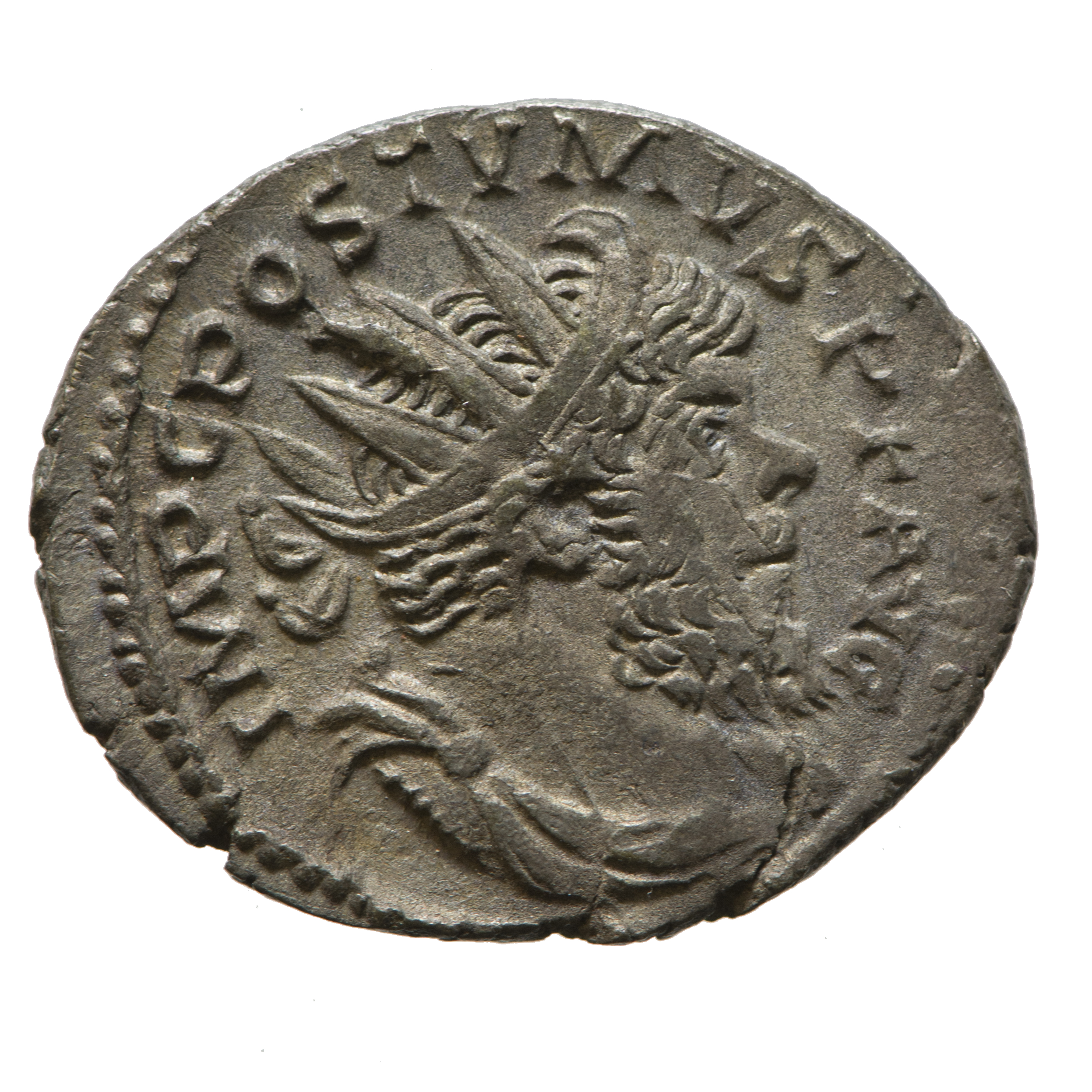
An antoninianus of Postumus. Legend: IMP. C. POSTVMVS P. F. AVG.

By the end of 265, Postumus's coin issues were triumphantly commemorating the victory over Gallienus, and the festivities celebrating his quinquennalia continued into the following year. Very little troubled the reign of Postumus from 265 to 268; archaeological evidence, such as it is, points to a general return to peace and normalcy. In 266, Postumus became consul for the fourth time, taking as his colleague Marcus Piavonius Victorinus, a Gallic noble who was also a senior military officer; his selection to such a high-profile position may be seen as an attempt to broaden Postumus's base of support. The year 268 saw the issuing of the 'Labours of Hercules' series of gold coins in honour of Postumus's favourite god. A sudden debasement of the coinage later that year shows that Postumus was facing increasing financial difficulties, due perhaps to a disruption of silver production in the Spanish mines or the need to buy off an increasingly discontented army.

Such discontent was probably due to Postumus's failure to take advantage of a golden opportunity to move against Gallienus in 268. Aureolus, the general who was in command of Mediolanum (Milan) in Gallienus's interest, rebelled and ultimately declared for Postumus. The city of Mediolanum and its north Italian and Raetian hinterland would have been critical to Postumus if he planned to march on Rome. For whatever reason, Postumus failed to support Aureolus, who was defeated by Gallienus and besieged inside Mediolanum. Before the end of summer in 268, Gallienus was assassinated, and his successor, Claudius II, captured and killed Aureolus. At the same time, a sequence of events began which would end Postumus's rule in Gaul.

=== Fall ===
Postumus assumed his fifth consulship on 1 January 269, but the army in Germania Superior raised a usurper in early 269. Laelianus, one of Postumus's top military leaders and the governor of Germania Superior, was declared emperor in Mogontiacum (now Mainz) by the local garrison and surrounding troops (Legio XXII Primigenia). Within a few months, Postumus was able to capture Mogontiacum and kill Laelianus. His army wanted to sack the defeated city, and when Postumus tried to restrain them, the soldiers turned on him and killed him.

The mutineers set up Marius, a common soldier, as emperor. Marius held sway for a short while before being overthrown by Victorinus, Postumus's erstwhile colleague in the consulship and tribune of the praetorian guard. In the meantime, the Gallic Empire lost Hispania.

== Legacy ==
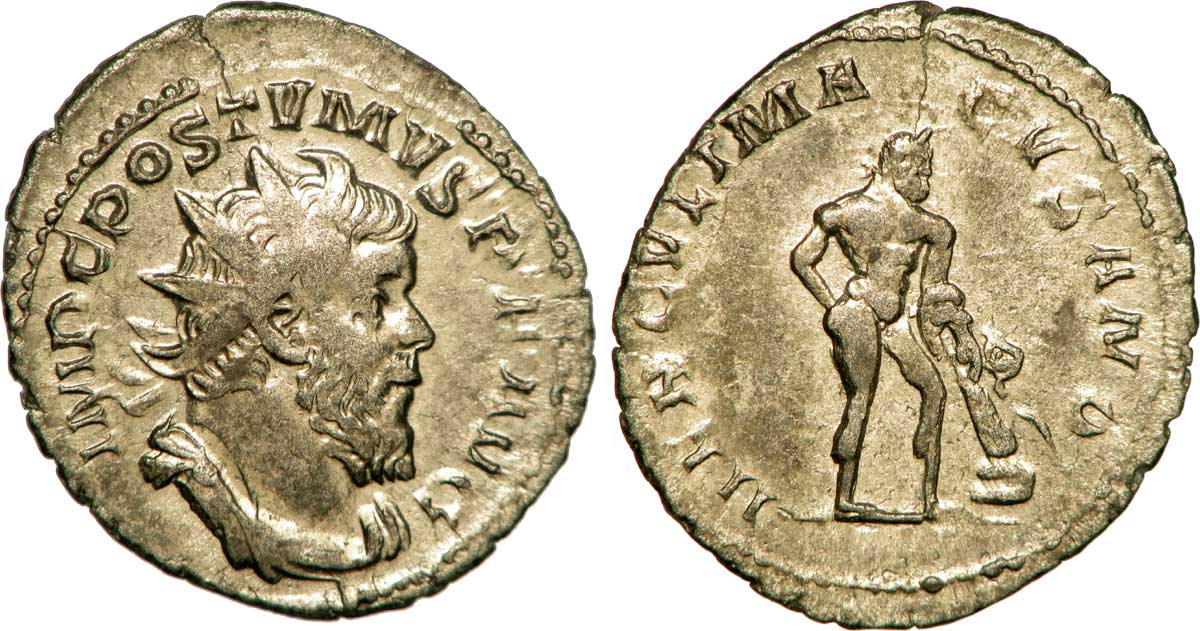
Antoninianus struck under Aureolus; Mediolanum (Milan) mint, AD 268. Left: Radiate, draped, and cuirassed bust Right: Hercules standing right, holding lion skin and club resting on rock

Postumus's coinage has been of particular interest to numismatists, in light of the high quality and relative abundance of his coin issues. His 'Labours of Hercules' series is particularly renowned, as are several aurei which carry full-face portraits of Postumus instead of the usual profile view.

== Historical sources ==
Most of the ancient literary references to Postumus come from the works thought to be based on the Enmannsche Kaisergeschichte (Aurelius Victor, Epitome de Caesaribus, Eutropius, and the Historia Augusta, in the last of which Postumus is listed among the Thirty Tyrants). He also figures in the works of Zosimus and Zonaras.

== Notes ==
Regnal titles
Preceded by Gallienus	Gallic emperor 260–269	Succeeded by Laelian and/or Marius
Political offices
Preceded by Aemilianus, Pomponius Bassus	Gallic consul 261–262 with Honoratianus	Unknown
Unknown	Gallic consul 268–269 with Victorinus	Succeeded by Victorinus, Sanctus
