= Tetricus II =

Roman caesar from 273 to 274

- Caesar of the Gallic Empire
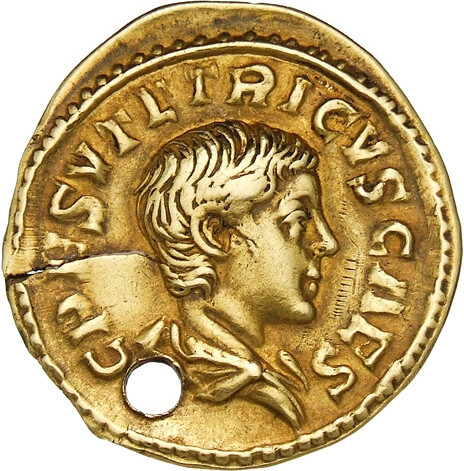
- Aureus of Tetricus II; Inscription: C. P. ESV. TETRICVS CAES.
- Reign: 273–274 (as Caesar); 274 (possibly as Augustus)
- Predecessor: Tetricus I
Names
- Gaius Pius Esuvius Tetricus
- Father: Tetricus I
- Mother: Nera Pivesuvia

Gaius Pius Esuvius Tetricus, better known as Tetricus II, was the son and heir of Tetricus I, emperor of the Gallic Empire from 271 to 274 AD.

In 273, he was given the title of Caesar alongside that of princeps iuventutis, and in January 274 he started his first consulship, together with his father.

After the defeat and deposition of his father in the autumn of 274 by the Emperor Aurelian, he and his father appeared as prisoners in Aurelian's triumph, but the emperor spared their lives. According to some sources, Tetricus II was also allowed to keep his senatorial rank.

There is some debate on whether he was proclaimed augustus on the final weeks on the Gallic empire, as the evidence (coins) for this are rare and of disputed authenticity (possibly barbarous issues).
