= Marcus Aurelius Marius =

Emperor of the Roman Gallic empire in 269

Marius
- Augustus of Gaul and Britannia
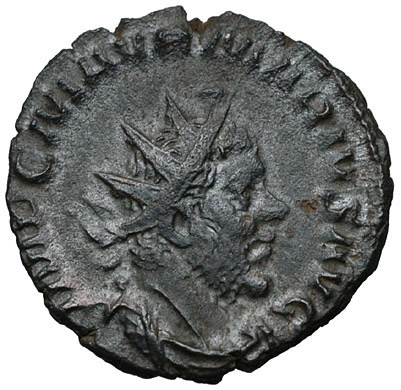
- Coin featuring Marius. Caption: IMP. C. M. AVR. MARIVS AVG.

Emperor of the Gallic Empire
- Reign: 269
- Predecessor: Postumus
- Successor: Victorinus
- Died: 269; Augusta Treverorum (Trier)
Names
- Marcus Aurelius Marius
Regnal name
- Imperator Caesar Marcus Aurelius Marius Augustus

Marcus Aurelius Marius was emperor of the Gallic Empire in 269 following the assassination of Postumus.

== Reign ==
According to later tradition, particularly sources like the Historia Augusta, his trade as a blacksmith led to him being nicknamed after Mamurius Veturius, a legendary metalworker from the time of King Numa Pompilius. He rose through the ranks of the Roman army to become an officer, although his specific rank prior to becoming emperor is not definitively recorded. He was part of the army forces that revolted at Moguntiacum (Mainz) after the Emperor Postumus refused to allow them to sack the city following the defeat of the usurper Laelianus. These troops murdered Postumus, and in the ensuing confusion, the army acclaimed Marius as Postumus' successor.

One of his first decisions was to allow his troops to sack Moguntiacum, thereby fulfilling the desire that had contributed to the revolt. He then moved to Augusta Treverorum (Trier) to consolidate his power. His reign ended when Victorinus, a prominent officer formerly loyal to Postumus (and soon to be emperor himself), had Marius killed in mid-269, most likely at Augusta Treverorum. Based on the significant number of coins issued in his name, modern historians estimate his reign lasted for approximately two to three months.

This modern estimation contrasts sharply with accounts from ancient written sources, notably the Historia Augusta and Eutropius, which claim Marius' reign lasted only two or three days before he was killed, allegedly by a sword of his own manufacture. This traditional account of his reign's length is considered inaccurate due to the numismatic evidence, and the story of his death by a sword of his own making is likely legendary, perhaps inspired by his reputed origins.

Marius is listed as one of the Thirty Tyrants in the Historia Augusta. This source suggests he was chosen as emperor partly because his name recalled two famous Romans of the past, Marcus Aurelius and Gaius Marius.

== Sources ==
=== Primary sources ===
- Aurelius Victor, Epitome de Caesaribus
- Aurelius Victor, Liber de Caesaribus
- Eutropius, Brevarium, Book 9
- Historia Augusta, Tyranni_XXX*.html The Thirty Tyrants

=== Secondary sources ===
- Martindale, John R.; Jones, A. H. M.; Morris, John, eds. (1971). The Prosopography of the Later Roman Empire: Volume I, AD 260–395. Cambridge: Cambridge University Press. ISBN 0-521-07233-6.
- Polfer, Michel, "Postumus (A.D. 269)", De Imperatoribus Romanis (1999)
- Potter, David Stone, The Roman Empire at Bay, AD 180-395, Routledge, 2004
- Southern, Pat. The Roman Empire from Severus to Constantine, Routledge, 2001

Regnal titles
Preceded by Postumus and/or Laelian	Emperor of the Gallic Empire; 269	Succeeded by Victorinus
