= Laelian =

Gallic usurper in 269

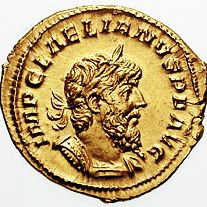
- Laelian on an aureus. Caption: IMP. C. LAELIANVS P. F. AVG.

Gallic usurper
- Reign: approximately late February to early June 269 (against Postumus)
- Predecessor: Postumus
- Successor: Marcus Aurelius Marius
- Born: Gaul
- Died: 269
Names
- Ulpius Cornelius Laelianus

Laelian (/leɪliən/; Latin: Ulpius Cornelius Laelianus), also incorrectly referred to as Lollianus and Aelianus, was a usurper against Postumus, the emperor of the Gallic Empire. His revolt lasted from approximately late February to early June 269.

== Origins ==
Little is known about Laelian. He shares the same nomen as a prominent Hispano-Roman family, the Ulpii, that included Trajan among its members, and may have been a relative. This is supported by the strong allusion to Hispania on an aureus he struck, which featured a reclining personification of Hispania with a rabbit at her side. If he indeed was a relative, this may be the reason Hispania allied itself with Claudius II, after the death of Laelian, seemingly without a struggle.

== Rule ==
Laelian declared himself emperor at Moguntiacum (modern-day Mainz in Germany) in February/March 269, after repulsing a Germanic invasion. Although his exact position is unknown, he is believed to have been a senior officer under Postumus, either the legatus of Germania Superior or the commander of Legio XXII Primigenia. Laelian represented a strong danger to Postumus because of the two legions he commanded (Primigenia in Moguntiacum and VIII Augusta in Argentoratum); Despite this, his rebellion lasted only about two months before he was executed, reputedly by his own soldiers, or by Postumus' troops after a siege of Laelian's capital. The siege of Moguntiacum was also fatal for Postumus; it is said he was slain when he refused to allow his troops to plunder the city following its capture.

Laelian (under the Latin name Lollianus) is listed among the Thirty Tyrants in the Historia Augusta.

== See also ==
- Ulpia gens
- List of Roman usurpers

== Sources ==
=== Primary sources ===
- Aurelius Victor, Liber de Caesaribus
- Eutropius, Brevarium, Book 9
- Historia Augusta, The Thirty Tyrants

=== Secondary sources ===
- Southern, Pat. The Roman Empire from Severus to Constantine, Routledge, 2001
- Potter, David Stone, The Roman Empire at Bay, AD 180-395, Routledge, 2004
- Jones, A.H.M., Martindale, J.R. The Prosopography of the Later Roman Empire, Vol. I: AD260-395, Cambridge University Press, 1971
- Michel Polfer, "Laelianus (A.D. 269)", De Imperatoribus Romanis] (1999)
