= Trebellianus =

Fictional ancient Roman usurper

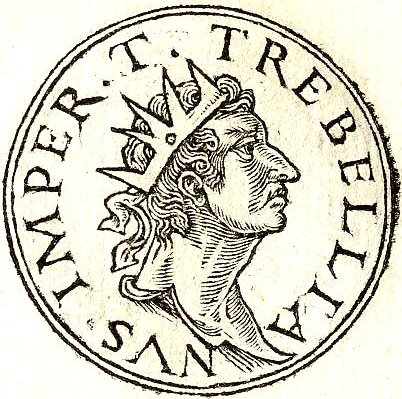
Portrait from Promptuarium Iconum Insigniorum (1553)

Trebellianus (d. 260–268) was a Roman usurper listed among the thirty tyrants in the Historia Augusta. Modern historians consider this figure a character invented by the author of Historia, whose traditional name was Trebellius Pollio.

== Description ==
According to Historia, Trebellianus was a Cilician robber, who called his castle in the fastnesses of the Isaurian mountains the Palatium (as the imperial palace on the Palatine, in Rome), established a mint, and gave himself the title of emperor. But having been tempted to quit his stronghold and descend into the plain, he was there encountered and slain by Causisoleus, an Egyptian, one of the generals of Gallienus (dux Gallieni), brother of Aurelius Theodotus who had defeated Mussius Aemilianus.

Trebellianus is also cited by Eutropius (Breviarium, ix.8). The passage is considered a later interpolation, or an error for "Regalianus" — and in fact several editions of Eutropius amend the text with Regalianus. In the latter case, it is possible that this passage gave inspiration to the author of Historia for its Trebellianus.

== See also ==
- Trebellia gens

== Sources ==
- Article originally taken from the public domain Dictionary of Greek and Roman Biography and Mythology, edited by William Smith.
- Körner, Christian "Fictitious usurpers: Trebellianus, Celsus and Saturninus", s.v. "Usurpers under Gallienus" De Imperatoribus Romanis
