= Ovinia gens =

The gens Ovinia was a plebeian family at Rome. Members of this gens occur in history toward the end of the Republic, and from then to at least the fourth century. They produced generations of Roman senators, with Gaius Ovinius Tertullus obtaining the consulship toward the end of the second century.

== Origin ==
The nomen Ovinius belongs to a class of gentilicia formed from other names using the suffix -inius. In this case, it seems to be a patronymic surname derived from the Oscan praenomen Ovius.

== Branches and cognomina ==
Among the surnames of the Ovinii were Camillus, Rusticus, and Tertullus. Camillus was an ancient cognomen referring to a youth in the service of a priestly office, and was made famous by the dictator Marcus Furius Camillus during the fourth century BC. Rusticus referred to someone of rural origin or habits. Tertullus is a diminutive of the cognomen Tertius, "third".

== Members ==
This list includes abbreviated praenomina. For an explanation of this practice, see filiation.

- Ovinius, proposed a law known as the lex Ovinia, granting certain powers to the censors in order to maintain the list of senators. The law was passed by plebiscitum, but its date is uncertain.
- Quintus Ovinius, a Roman senator at the time of the war between Octavian and Marcus Antonius, who had taken charge of Cleopatra's spinning and weaving workshops. Octavian, who considered this conduct disgraceful for a senator, had Ovinius put to death at the conclusion of the war.
- Gaius Ovinius Tertullus, consul suffectus before AD 198, subsequently became legate pro praetore (Note: A type of provincial governor.) of Moesia Inferior during the reigns of Septimius Severus and Caracalla.
- Ovinius Camillus, a senator who considered instigating a rebellion against the emperor Severus Alexander. When his inclinations were discovered, the emperor treated him with clemency.
- Lucius Ovinius L. f. Rusticus Cornelianus, consul in AD 237, during the reign of Maximinus Thrax. He had been tribune of the plebs, praetor, legate of one of the legions in Mysia inferior, and curator of the Via Tiburtina and the Via Flaminia.
- Rufria Ovinia L. f. L. n. Corneliana, daughter of the consul Rusticus Cornelianus.
- Ovinius Pacatianus, praefectus urbi in AD 276 and 277.
- Ovinius Paternus, praefectus urbi in AD 281, could possibly be the same person as Nonius Paternus, the consul of 279.
- Lucius Ovinius Curius Proculus Modianus Africanus, consul in an uncertain year. His wife was Claudiana Eusebia, and he was the grandfather of Lucius Ovinius Africanus. His monument at Rome dates to the end of the third or the beginning of the fourth century.
- Lucius Ovinius Africanus, grandson of the consul Africanus.
- Ovinius Gallicanus, praefectus urbi in AD 316, and consul suffectus the following year.

== See also ==
- List of Roman gentes

== Bibliography ==
- Aelius Lampridius, Aelius Spartianus, Flavius Vopiscus, Julius Capitolinus, Trebellius Pollio, and Vulcatius Gallicanus, Historia Augusta (Augustan History).
- Chronography of 354.
- Paulus Orosius, Historiarum Adversum Paganos (History Against the Pagans).
- Dictionary of Greek and Roman Biography and Mythology, William Smith, ed., Little, Brown and Company, Boston (1849).
- Theodor Mommsen et alii, Corpus Inscriptionum Latinarum (The Body of Latin Inscriptions, abbreviated CIL), Berlin-Brandenburgische Akademie der Wissenschaften (1853–present).
- George Davis Chase, "The Origin of Roman Praenomina", in Harvard Studies in Classical Philology, vol. VIII (1897).
- Paul von Rohden, Elimar Klebs, & Hermann Dessau, Prosopographia Imperii Romani (The Prosopography of the Roman Empire, abbreviated PIR), Berlin (1898).
- A. H. M. Jones & J. R. Martindale, The Prosopography of the Later Roman Empire (abbreviated PLRE), Cambridge University Press (1971–1992).
