= Trebellia gens =

Ancient Roman family

The gens Trebellia, occasionally written Trebelia, was a plebeian family at ancient Rome. Members of this gens are first mentioned at the time of the Second Punic War, but they played little role in the Roman state until the final decades of the Republic. Trebellii are known from inscriptions in Delos and in Athens between 150 and 89 BC. The most illustrious of the Trebellii was Marcus Trebellius Maximus, who attained the consulship in AD 55.

== Members ==
This list includes abbreviated praenomina. For an explanation of this practice, see filiation.

- Quintus Trebellius, a centurion who received the mural crown from Scipio Africanus in 210 BC, in recognition of his bravery in battle.
- Marcus Trebellius, a native of Fregellae in Latium, was a soldier serving the legate Lucius Coelius in Illyria during the Third Macedonian War.
- Marcus Trebellius, described by Cicero as a friend of Sextus Naevius in 81 BC.
- Lucius Trebellius, tribune of the plebs in 67 BC, together with his colleague, Lucius Roscius Otho, opposed the appointment of Pompeius to make war against the pirates. Trebellius refused all efforts to remove his objection, until his colleague Aulus Gabinius, who had proposed Pompeius' appointment, called upon the Comitia Tributa to remove Trebellius from office. Trebellius withdrew his opposition just before Gabinius could obtain a majority.
- Lucius Trebellius Fides, tribune of the plebs in 47 BC. In order to gain Caesar's favour, he opposed a measure proposed by his colleague, Publius Cornelius Dolabella, to abolish debts, although he himself was heavily indebted, and he proposed a similar measure after Caesar's death. He was a friend of Mark Antony, alongside whom he fought against Decimus Junius Brutus Albinus in 43 BC.
- Aulus Trebellius, an eques in the army of Pompeius in 45 BC, during the Civil War, went over to Caesar during the Spanish campaign.
- Marcus Trebellius, a legate serving under Lucius Vitellius, the governor of Syria in AD 36.
- Trebellius Calca, went before the court of the centumviri, claiming to be the son of Publius Clodius Pulcher, that he might succeed to the latter's estate.
- Marcus Trebellius Maximus, consul suffectus for the months of July and August in AD 55, alongside Lucius Annaeus Seneca. Appointed governor of Britain in 63, he was deeply disliked by his soldiers, who forced him to flee to Vitellius for support following the death of Nero. Instead of restoring Trebellius, the emperor appointed a new governor, Marcus Vettius Bolanus.
- Trebellius Pollio, one of the six supposed authors of Historia Augusta. Flavius Vopiscus, another of the scriptores, describes Pollio as careless and lacking in detail. According to him, Pollio wrote "lives" of the emperors from Philip the Arab to Claudius Gothicus, covering the period from AD 244 to 270, but only those covering Valerian, Gallienus, Claudius, and the Thirty Tyrants are extant.

== See also ==
- List of Roman gentes
- Trebellianus

== Bibliography ==
- Marcus Tullius Cicero, Epistulae ad Familiares, Philippicae, Pro Quinctio.
- Gaius Julius Caesar (attributed), De Bello Hispaniensis (On the War in Spain).
- Titus Livius (Livy), History of Rome.
- Valerius Maximus, Factorum ac Dictorum Memorabilium (Memorable Facts and Sayings).
- Quintus Asconius Pedianus, Commentarius in Oratio Ciceronis Pro Cornelio (Commentary on Cicero's Oration Pro Cornelio).
- Publius Cornelius Tacitus, Annales; Historiae; De Vita et Moribus Iulii Agricolae (On the Life and Mores of Julius Agricola).
- Lucius Mestrius Plutarchus (Plutarch), Lives of the Noble Greeks and Romans.
- Lucius Cassius Dio, Roman History.
- Dictionary of Greek and Roman Biography and Mythology, William Smith, ed., Little, Brown and Company, Boston (1849).
- Arne Søby Christensen, Cassiodorus, Jordanes and the History of the Goths: Studies in a Migration Myth, Museum Tusculanum Press (2002), ISBN 9788772897103.
- Transactions of the Cumberland & Westmorland Antiquarian & Archeological Society, James Simpson, Richard Saul Ferguson, William Gershom Collingwood (eds.), The Society (2002).
- Philip Kay, Rome's Economic Revolution (Oxford Studies on the Roman Economy), Oxford University Press (2014), ISBN 9780199681549.
- Anthony Corbelli, Controlling Laughter: Political Humor in the Late Roman Republic, Princeton University Press (2015), ISBN 9781400872893.
- Edmund P. Cueva and Javier Martínez, Splendide Mendax: Rethinking Fakes and Forgeries in Classical, Late Antique, and Early Christian Literature, Barkuis (2016), ISBN 9789491431982.
