= Titus (usurper) =

Roman usurper

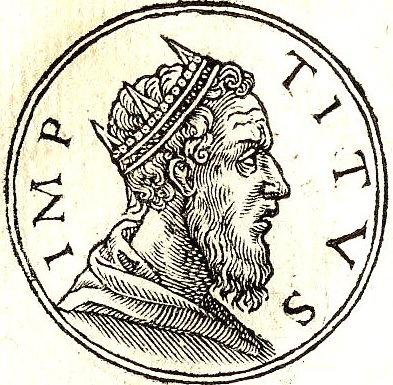
Titus from Guillaume Rouillé's Promptuarii Iconum Insigniorum

Titus is one of the Thirty Tyrants, a list of Roman usurpers compiled by the author(s) of the often unreliable Historia Augusta. Titus was said to have revolted against Maximinus Thrax, a Roman Emperor who ruled 235–238, after the revolt of Magnus. It is now believed that his biography is fraudulent, and that he may be based on person named Quartinus mentioned by the historian Herodian.

According to the Historia Augusta, Titus was a tribune of the Mauri, who had been deposed by Maximinus and transferred to a civilian position. After the revolt of Magnus had been quelled, Titus, fearing for his life, reluctantly seized the power, having the purple compelled on him by his soldiers. He ruled for six months, and the Historia stated he deserved praises both home and abroad, but in the end Maximinus suppressed the revolt and killed Titus.

Also noteworthy is Titus's equally fictitious wife, Calpurnia of the gens Caesonia, and who it was claimed had been a priestess, whose statue, in marble and golden bronze, was located in the Temple of Venus. She reportedly owned the pearls that had belonged to Cleopatra VII of Egypt, and a famous one hundred-pound silver platter, with the histories of her noteworthy family - the implication being that she was a descendant of Lucius Calpurnius Piso Caesoninus, the Roman consul of 148 BC, and a distant relation of Calpurnia, the wife of Julius Caesar. This link is further developed in two ways; firstly, her statue is described as being placed in the Temple of Venus Genetrix, where Caesar had once placed a statue of Cleopatra. Secondly, her possession of Cleopatra's pearls also reinforces her role as a female figure representing traditional Romanitas, compared against the previous owner who was traditionally represented as everything that was contrary to Roman values. Her possession of Cleopatra's pearls is also fictitious, as Pliny the Elder recounts that one of Cleopatra's pearls was dissolved in vinegar and drunk by Cleopatra in front of Marc Antony, while the other was made into earrings for the statue of Venus that stood in the Temple of Venus Genetrix.

There is no evidence that the family of the Pisones still existed in the third century, and this Calpurnia is most likely an invention of the author's, due to his desire to pepper his work with great names.
