= Sulpicia (disambiguation) =

Sulpicia may refer to:

== People ==
- Sulpicia (wife of Quintus Fulvius Flaccus), judged the most virtuous of all the Roman matrons.
- Sulpicia, Augustan poet
- Sulpicia (satirist), poet active during the reign of Domitian
- Sulpicia (wife of Lentulus Cruscellio)
- Sulpicia Cesis (born 1577), Italian composer and lutenist
- Sulpicia Dryantilla, wife of Regalianus, a Roman usurper against Gallienus
- Sulpicia Lepidina, wife of Flavius Cerialis

== Other ==
- Sulpicia (gens), ancient patrician family of Rome
- Sulpicia (bug), a genus of bugs in the family Coreidae
- Ala Sulpicia, a cavalry unit in the Roman army
