= Passiena gens =

Ancient Roman family

The gens Passiena, occasionally written Passienia, Passenia, Passennia, or Passenna, was a plebeian family at ancient Rome, originally of equestrian rank, but at least one member was later admitted to the patriciate. Members of this gens appear in history from the early years of the Empire down to the third century, and several obtained the consulship, beginning with Lucius Passienus Rufus in 4 BC.

== Origin ==
The varying orthography of the nomen makes it difficult to be certain of its origin, but Passienus seems to be the most common. The gentile-forming suffix -enus was not typical of Latin names, but was common in Picenum and Umbria. This has been regularized to Passienius or Passenius in a few instances, giving the name a more Roman appearance; the form Passennus, found in some sources with other variants, would be typical of a Latinized Etruscan gentilicium, originally ending in -enna, but this resemblance is probably accidental.

== Members ==
This list includes abbreviated praenomina. For an explanation of this practice, see filiation.

- Passienus, the father of Rufus, was an orator mentioned by Seneca the Elder. He died in 9 BC.
- Lucius Passienus Rufus, consul in 4 BC, and subsequently proconsul of Africa, where he won a number of military victories, for which he was awarded the triumphal ornaments.
- Gaius Sallustius Passienus L. f. Crispus, son of the consul Rufus, and the grandson of a sister of the historian Sallust, who had no children of his own. Sallust adopted his grandnephew, who assumed his nomenclature. He was a confidant of Augustus and Tiberius, but held no public office. Tacitus reports that he died in AD 20. He is frequently confused with his son.
- Gaius Sallustius Passienus C. f. L. n. Crispus, grandson of Rufus, was the husband of Agrippina, and stepfather of Nero. He was a wealthy man, and a highly respected orator, and was consul twice, the second time in AD 44, early in the reign of Claudius.
- Gaius Passienus Paulus, (Note: Or Passennus, or Passennius.) an eques, highly regarded as a friend and fellow-poet by Pliny the Younger.
- Gaius Passienius C. f. Cossonius Scipio Orfitus, served as senator, augur, quaestor urbanus, and a judicial magistrate. He was praetor designatus, and curator of Sutrium, and was admitted to the patriciate.
- Passienus Rufus, a friend of the orator and grammarian Marcus Cornelius Fronto. He was consul suffectus in AD 142.
- Quintus Passienus Licinus, consul suffectus in AD 149.
- Passenia Petronia, a woman of a senatorial family, named on a tile from about the time of Commodus.
- Vibius Passienus, (Note: The interpretation of this name is very uncertain. Vibius was a praenomen that could also be a gentilicium; since Romans aristocrats of the imperial era frequently had multiple nomina, it seems more likely that it was his nomen, and that Passienus was an additional nomen. But even if this is the case, the governor could still be a lineal descendant of the Passieni, who has prefixed a maternal nomen to his gentilicium.) governor of Africa Proconsularis between AD 260 and 268, during the reign of Gallienus. According to Trebellius Pollio, he attempted to place the usurper Celsus on the throne, but his rebellion was swiftly quashed.

== See also ==
- List of Roman gentes

== Bibliography ==
- Marcus Velleius Paterculus, Compendium of Roman History.
- Lucius Annaeus Seneca (Seneca the Elder), Controversiae.
- Lucius Annaeus Seneca (Seneca the Younger), De Beneficiis (On Kindness), Naturales Quaestiones (Natural Questions).
- Marcus Fabius Quintilianus (Quintilian), Institutio Oratoria (Institutes of Oratory).
- Gaius Plinius Caecilius Secundus (Pliny the Younger), Epistulae (Letters).
- Marcus Cornelius Fronto, Epistulae ad Amicos (Letters to Friends).
- Aelius Lampridius, Aelius Spartianus, Flavius Vopiscus, Julius Capitolinus, Trebellius Pollio, and Vulcatius Gallicanus, Historia Augusta (Augustan History).
- Dictionary of Greek and Roman Biography and Mythology, William Smith, ed., Little, Brown and Company, Boston (1849).
- George Davis Chase, "The Origin of Roman Praenomina", in Harvard Studies in Classical Philology, vol. VIII (1897).
- Paul von Rohden, Elimar Klebs, & Hermann Dessau, Prosopographia Imperii Romani (The Prosopography of the Roman Empire, abbreviated PIR), Berlin (1898).
