= Censorinus (usurper) =

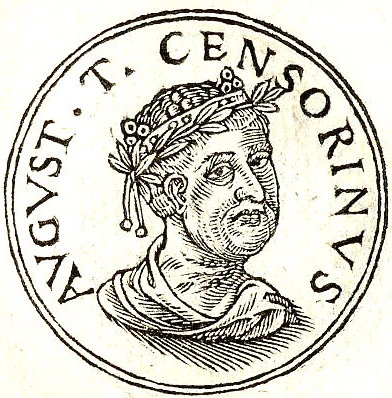
Censorinus from Guillaume Rouillé's Promptuarii Iconum Insigniorum

Appius Claudius Censorinus was a fictitious usurper against Roman Emperor Claudius II, (in ca AD 269) according to the unreliable Historia Augusta. He is included in the list of the Thirty Tyrants.

It is claimed that he had a lengthy career, having served twice as a consul, twice as a praetorian prefect, thrice as a praefectus urbi, and four times as a proconsul. He served under Valerian in the Roman–Persian Wars and was wounded in combat. His wounds forced him to retire from military service. He was already an old man and long retired when the troops of Bononia revolted and proclaimed him an Augustus. He was killed by his own soldiers, because he enforced too strict discipline. His reign lasted only a few days.

The entire account is a fabrication. His name and career are meant to reflect traditional Roman values, and may form part of the author's agenda when he wrote the Historia Augusta.

Francisco Mediobarbo Birago, a 17th-century numismatist, reported the existence of a coin commemorating the 3rd year of Censorinus' reign. The lack of sources for such a coin make it likely that it was a forgery of some kind. Louis-Sébastien Le Nain de Tillemont suggested that Censorinus and Victorinus could be the same person.

== Sources ==
- Smith, William George (1844), Dictionary of Greek and Roman Biography and Mythology, Vol. 1, Taylor and Walton
- Weigel, Richard D., "Claudius II Gothicus (268-270)", De Imperatoribus Romanis
