= Valens (usurper) =

Valens (died 250 AD) is one of the Thirty Tyrants, a list of Roman usurpers compiled by the author(s) of the Historia Augusta.

According to Historia, this Valens was the uncle or great-uncle of another usurper, Valens Thessalonicus, who revolted against Emperor Gallienus. Valens senior would have revolted in Illyria against an earlier emperor, and would have been killed by his own soldiers after few days, as happened to his nephew.

It is possible that this Valens was Julius Valens Licinianus or Licinian, who usurped the purple in Rome during the absence of the Emperor Decius in the war against the Goths (250), and who was quickly executed.
