= Thirty Tyrants (disambiguation) =

Thirty Tyrants may refer to either of two groups of rulers in classical Antiquity:

- Thirty Tyrants, a pro-Spartan oligarchy installed in Athens after its defeat in the Peloponnesian War in 404 BCE
- Thirty Tyrants (Roman), a series of thirty rulers who appear in the Historia Augusta as having ostensibly been pretenders to the throne of the Roman Empire during the reign of the emperor Gallienus (reigned 253–268); but there is a scholarly consensus that the author of the Historia Augusta deliberately inflated the number of pretenders in order to parallel the Thirty Tyrants of Athens
