= Lucius Mussius Aemilianus =

Usurper of throne of Roman Empire (died 261/262)

- Usurper of the Roman Empire
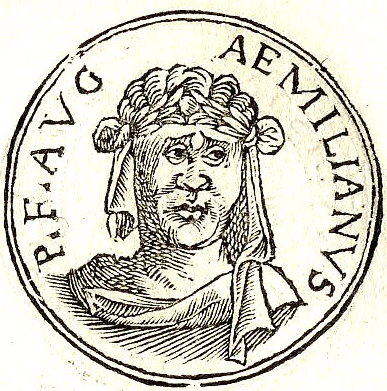
- Aemilianus from Promptuarii Iconum Insigniorum
- Reign: 260 or 260-261
- Predecessor: Gallienus
- Successor: Gallienus
- Died: 261 or 262
Names
- Lucius Mussius Aemilianus signo Aegippius
Regnal name
- Imperator Caesar Lucius Mussius Aemilianus Augustus
- Father: Italian

Lucius Mussius Aemilianus signo Aegippius (died 261 or 262) was a Roman who held a number of military and civilian positions during the middle of the third century. He is best known as a Roman usurper during the reign of Gallienus.

== Sources ==
The sources for this emperor include Eusebius, Ecclesiae Historia 7.11; Epitome de Caesaribus, 32.4; Historia Augusta, "Gallienus" 4.1–2, 5.6, 9.1; "Tyranni Triginta" 22.1–8, as well as several papyri and one inscription.

== Career ==
Mussius Aemilianus probably was of Italian stock. His career in imperial service is documented up to 18 May 247 from an inscription recovered at Fiumicino. Appointments he held up to that date include praefectus vehiculorum trium provinciarum Galliarum, procurator Alexandreae Pelusi and a third location (now lost), procurator portus utriusque Ostiae.

Valerian appointed him Praefectus of Roman Egypt, a position he held from possibly as early as 256 to 261. While the primary concern of the governor of Egypt was to safeguard the harvest and delivery of grain to the populace of Rome, he had other responsibilities which included resuming the persecution of Christians that had started under his predecessor Aurelius Appius Sabinus. Eusebius preserves a letter of Bishop Dionysius of Alexandria where the bishop documents his trial before Mussius Aemilianus for professing Christianity, for which he was exiled to Cephro in the Libyan Desert. A surviving papyrus, dated to 259/260, has been identified as an independent witness to this trial.

== Usurpation ==
He supported the rebellion of the Macriani against Gallienus (260–261). When the Macriani were defeated Mussius Aemilianus proclaimed himself emperor.

Gallienus sent his general Aurelius Theodotus to Egypt to deal with Aemilianus. After a short struggle Aemilianus was defeated (before 30 March 262), captured, and later strangled in prison. Subsequently Memor, a possible supporter, was executed.

== See also ==
- Gallienus usurpers – Roman usurpers during the reign of emperor Gallienus
