= Gallienus usurpers =

Roman usurpers during the reign of emperor Gallienus

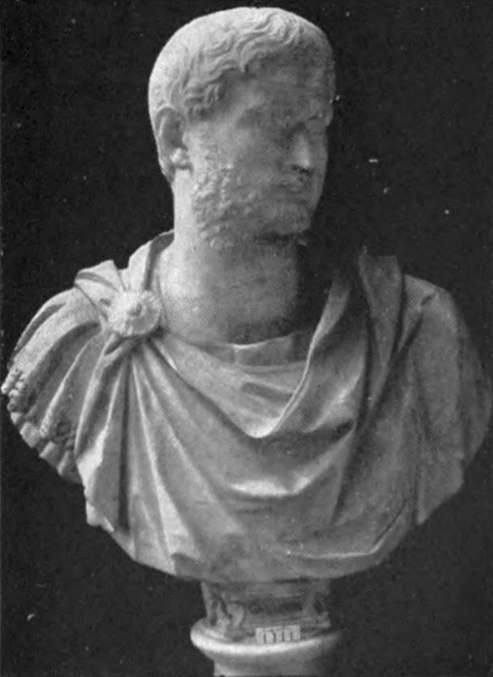
Ancient Roman bust of Gallienus.

The Gallienus usurpers were the usurpers who claimed imperial power during the reign of Gallienus (253–268, the first part of which he shared with his father Valerian). The existence of usurpers during the Crisis of the Third Century was very common, and the high number of usurpers fought by Gallienus is due to his long rule; fifteen years being considered long by the standards of the 3rd century Roman Empire.

== Uprisings after the defeat of Valerian ==
After Valerian's defeat and capture by the Persians in 260, his son Gallienus became the only emperor. However, many uprisings happened, both in the East, with the formation of the Palmyrene Empire, and in the West, with the birth of the Gallic Empire. With the uncertainty of the period, the legions wanted to restore Roman power in the wake of Valerian's defeat, against the pressure of the barbarian people in the west and the Persians in the East.

=== Usurpers in the West ===
- 260: Ingenuus – Chosen by the population and the army of the province of Pannonia. Manius Acilius Aureolus killed him at the behest of Gallienus in 260 during the battle at Mursa.
- 260: Regalian – After his victory over the Sarmatians in 260, he was killed by a coalition of his own people and of the Roxolani.
- 260–269: Postumus – Ruled over a Gallic Empire until his murder in 269.
- 268: Manius Acilius Aureolus – Initially a Gallienus supporter, Aureolus turned against Gallienus while fighting against Postumus and his Gallic Empire. In 268, having surrendered to Emperor Claudius Gothicus after the death of Gallienus, Aureolus was murdered by the Praetorian Guard before Claudius could decide what to do with him.

=== Usurpers in the East ===
- 260–261: Macrianus Major, Macrianus Minor, Quietus, and Balista, in the East. After Valerian's defeat, Gallienus was the only remaining emperor, but he was in the West. The Eastern army, needing a leader, offered the rule to Macrianus Major, a noble and wealthy man, but he refused because of his age and health. With the help of Balista, the Valerian prefect who had defeated the Persians after the emperor's death, and with Valerian wealth he held from his office of procurator arcae et praepositus annonae in expeditione Persica, Macrianus Major made his two sons Macrianus Minor and Quietus emperors. While Quietus and Balista stayed in the East and in Egypt to secure their rule, Macrianus Major and Minor moved to Thrace, to counter Gallienus, ruler of Italy and Illyricum. However, Gallienus' general Aureolus defeated and killed in battle both the Macriani, while Quietus was killed by Odaenathus of Palmyra.
- 261: Piso and Valens Thessalonicus, in Achaea. The only source for these two usurpers is the Historia Augusta. Valens was the governor of Achaea, and remained loyal to Gallienus. In his march west, Macrianus sent Lucius Calpurnius Piso Frugi to counter Valens. Valens' troops proclaimed their commander emperor, and Piso's troops did the same with their commander. Piso was then killed by Valens, who was later killed by his own troops. The account of Achaea events made by Historia Augusta is very obscure and contains some forgeries, such as a senatus consultum granting Piso a statue.
- 261: Mussius Aemilianus, in Aegyptus Province. Mussius supported the Macriani rebellion, controlling Egypt. When the Macriani were defeated, he probably proclaimed himself emperor, but was defeated and killed by Aurelius Theodotus, a general sent by Gallienus.
- 262: Memor was in Northern Africa. He projected a rebellion against Gallienus, but was killed by Theodotus.

== Historia Augusta historiography ==
The author(s) of the Historia Augusta listed several other Gallienus usurpers in the book on the "Thirty Tyrants." Given the notorious unreliability of the Historia Augusta, the veracity of this list is debatable. There is a scholarly consensus that the author deliberately inflated the number of pretenders in order to parallel the Thirty Tyrants of Athens. Edward Gibbon identified nineteen. The Historia actually gives 32 names. The author, who wrote under the name of Trebellius Pollio, places the last two during the reigns of Maximinus Thrax and Claudius II respectively, leaving thirty alleged pretenders during the reign of Gallienus.

The following list gives the Thirty Tyrants as depicted by the Historia Augusta, along with notes contrasting the Historia Augusta's claims with their actual historical positions:

Chapter in Historia Augusta	Name	Notes about historicity
2	Cyriades	never claimed Imperial dignity
3	Postumus	accurate placement
4	Postumus Junior	youth; probably never existed
5	Laelianus	accurate placement
6	Victorinus	contemporary not with Gallienus but Claudius II and Aurelian
7	Victorinus Junior	Fiction, never existed
8	Marius	accurate placement
9	Ingenuus	accurate placement
10	Regalianus	accurate placement
11	Aureolus	accurate placement
12	Macrianus	accurate placement
13	Macrianus Junior	accurate placement
14	Quietus	accurate placement
15	Odaenathus	never claimed Imperial dignity
16	Herodes	youth, never claimed Imperial dignity, but older brother of Vaballathus (see below), who did so.
17	Maeonius	never claimed Imperial dignity
18	Balista	never claimed Imperial dignity
19	Valens	probably never claimed Imperial dignity
20	Valens Superior	contemporary of Decius, not Valerianus
21	Piso	probably never claimed Imperial dignity
22	Aemilianus	probably never claimed Imperial dignity
23	Saturninus	probably fictitious
24	Tetricus Senior	contemporary not with Gallienus but Claudius II and Aurelian
25	Tetricus Junior	youth, contemporary not with Gallienus but Claudius II and Aurelian
26	Trebellianus	probably fictitious
27	Herennianus	youth, never claimed Imperial dignity, possibly fictitious
28	Timolaus	youth, never claimed Imperial dignity, possibly fictitious
29	Celsus	probably fictitious
30	Zenobia	female, accurate placement, her son Vaballathus also claimed imperial dignity
31	Victoria (or Vitruvia)	female, never claimed Imperial dignity
32	Titus	admittedly not contemporary with Gallienus but Maximinus Thrax
33	Censorinus	admittedly not contemporary with Gallienus but Claudius II

Notwithstanding the author's pretensions regarding the time during which these persons aspired to the throne, this list includes:

- two women and six youths who never claimed imperial dignity
- seven men who either certainly or probably never claimed imperial dignity
- three probably and two possibly fictitious persons
- two pretenders admittedly not contemporary with Gallienus
- three pretenders not contemporary with Gallienus

This leaves nine pretenders roughly contemporary with Gallienus. According to David Magie (the editor of the Loeb Classical Library edition of the Historia Augusta), at least some of these men issued coins.

== See also ==
- Historia Augusta
- Crisis of the Third Century
- Enmannsche Kaisergeschichte
- List of Roman usurpers
