= Victorinus Junior =

3rd-century Roman imperial usurper (likely fictional)

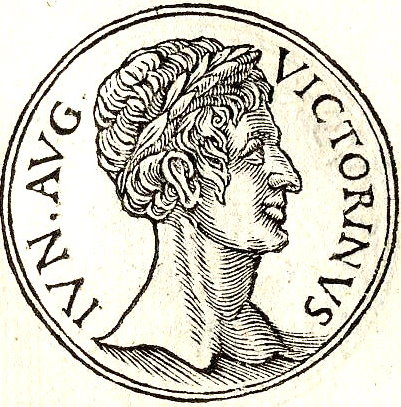
Victorinus Junior from "Promptuarii Iconum Insigniorum"

Victorinus Junior (supposedly died 271) was a fictional usurper who was claimed to have risen up against the Roman Emperor Aurelian, according to the Historia Augusta. He is included in the list of the Thirty Tyrants.

According to the often unreliable chapter describing the Thirty Tyrants, the Emperor of the Gallic Empire Victorinus had a son called Victorinus who was proclaimed Caesar by his father or grandmother (Victoria) just before Victorinus senior's death, but was himself killed by his soldiers alongside his father.

There is no evidence that this son existed or, if he did, that he was made Augustus. However, according to one view, on some coins struck by Victorinus Senior, the bust of Apollo is represented with the features of Victorinus Junior.
