= Sulpicia Dryantilla =

3rd-century Roman woman

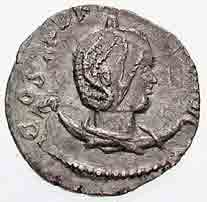
Sulpicia Dryantilla on a Roman coin

Sulpicia Dryantilla (died 260/261) was the wife of Regalianus, Roman usurper against Gallienus. Regalianus gave her the title of Augusta to legitimize his claim. Virtually nothing is known of her except that she was the daughter of Claudia Ammiana Dryantilla and Sulpicius Pollio, an accomplished senator and officer under Caracalla. She most likely died in 260/261 along with her husband, when he was killed by a coalition of his own people and the Rhoxolani.

Most, but not all, of Regalianus' coins have the formula AUGG. (implying two rulers, rather than AUG., which implies one) as part of their reverse legend. The plural AUGG. was likely intentional, but the intended meaning is not clear. It is more likely that it refers to the partnership between Regalianus and his wife Dryantilla, rather than to some partnership between Regalianus and Gallienus.

Dryantilla appears to have been politically -and economically - powerful.

== Sources ==
- Martindale, John R.; Jones, A. H. M.; Morris, John, eds. (1971). The Prosopography of the Later Roman Empire: Volume I, AD 260–395. Cambridge: Cambridge University Press. p. 273. ISBN 0-521-07233-6.
- Claes, Liesbeth (2015). "Coins with power?: imperial and local messages on the coinage of the usurpers of the second half of the third century (AD 235–285)". Jaarboek voor Munt- en Penningkunde. 102: 15–60.
