= Septimius (usurper) =

Usurper of the Roman Empire during 271 or 272

- Usurper of the Roman Empire
- Reign: 271 or 272 AD, during Aurelian's rule
- Predecessor: Aurelian
- Successor: Aurelian
- Died: 271 or 272 AD; Dalmatia
Names
- Septimius
Regnal name
- Imperator Caesar Septimius Augustus

Septimius (or Septiminus) was a Roman usurper who was proclaimed Emperor in either 271 or 272 AD, under the reign of Aurelian.

== History ==
Septimius declared himself emperor in either 271 or 272 AD, in Dalmatia, during the reign of Aurelian. The reason for his rebellion is not strictly known, although the threat of Gothic invasion may have played a part. He was killed by his own troops soon afterward.
