= Celsus (usurper) =

3rd-century Roman imperial usurper

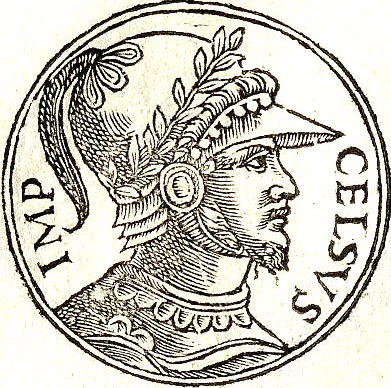
Celsus from Promptuarii Iconum Insigniorum

Titus Cornelius Celsus was supposedly a Roman usurper, who rebelled against Gallienus. He was one of the so-called Thirty Tyrants enumerated by Trebellius Pollio. His historicity is doubted by some scholars, who consider him an invention of the Historia Augusta.

According to the Historia Augusta, in the twelfth year of Gallienus' reign (265), when usurpers were springing up in every quarter of the Roman world, a certain Celsus, who had never risen higher in the service of the state than the rank of a military tribune, living quietly on his lands in Africa, in no way remarkable except as a man of upright life and commanding person, was suddenly proclaimed emperor by Vibius Passienus, proconsul of the province, and Fabius Pomponianus, general of the Libyan frontier. So sudden was the movement, that the appropriate trappings of dignity had not been provided, and the hands of Galliena, a cousin it is said of the lawful monarch, invested the new prince with a robe snatched from the statue of a goddess.

The downfall of Celsus was not less rapid than his elevation: he was slain on the seventh day, his body was devoured by dogs, and the loyal inhabitants of Sicca testified their devotion to the reigning sovereign by devising an insult to the memory of his rival unheard-of before that time. The effigy of the traitor was raised high upon a cross, round which the rabble danced in triumph.

== See also ==
- Gallienus usurpers
