= Ovinius Camillus =

Ovinius Camillus was allegedly a Roman usurper during the rule of Alexander Severus. Most scholars today consider him to be fictitious.

According to the unreliable Historia Augusta Ovinius Camillus was a senator from an ancient family, who conspired against the Emperor. The plot is however uncovered, but the usurper is, surprisingly, spared by Alexander Severus and even offered to rule alongside the Emperor.
