= Taurinius =

- Usurper of the Roman Empire
- Reign: 232 AD–Late summer 232 AD
- Elected by legion: 232 AD
- Predecessor: Severus Alexander
- Successor: Severus Alexander
- Died: Late summer 232 AD; Euphrates
Names
- Taurinius
Regnal name
- Imperator Caesar Taurinius Augustus

Taurinius (also called Taurinus) was a Roman usurper who revolted against Severus Alexander in 232 AD. He was declared emperor by the legions stationed in Roman Mesopotamia when they rebelled, due to the invasion of the Sassanids in 229 AD. His revolt was swiftly crushed by Alexander, in late summer of 232 AD, and he drowned in the Euphrates while attempting to flee to Sassanid territory.

== History ==
In 229 AD, during the reign of Emperor Severus Alexander, the Sassanids invaded Roman Mesopotamia. This led to a rebellion, in 232 AD, by the provincial garrison. During this rebellion, Flavius Heracleo was killed, and the legion proclaimed Taurinius emperor. In the late summer of 232 AD, Alexander arrived to crush the revolt. Taurinius fled, and drowned while attempting to cross the Euphrates into Sassanid territory.

== Historiography ==
The Epitome de Caesaribus refers to him as Taurinius, and says that he revolted against Emperor Severus Alexander, and was declared augustus. He is said to have thrown himself into the Euphrates on account of fear of Severus Alexander. It is noted that this is the only mention of any event during Alexander's reign made by the Epitome de Caesaribus. Zonaras makes similar mention of him, but refers to him as Taurinus. Taurinius never controlled a mint, so no numismatic evidence of his revolt remains. Although mentioned in the Epitome de Caesaribus, Taurinius is noticeably absent from Aurelius Victor's De Caesaribus, and Eutropius's Breviarium historiae Romanae, and is not found in any other literary or epigraphic evidence.
