= Eugenius (Antioch) =

Usurper of the Roman Empire
- In office 303–304

Eugenius (Greek: Εὐγένιος; died 303/304) was a Roman usurper in Syria during the Tetrarchy. He was a tribune of 500 soldiers stationed in Seleucia Pieria, who proclaimed him emperor in 303. He marched with his troops to Antioch, where he fell in battle.

== Sources ==
- DiMaio, Michael, "Eugenius (303/304 A.D.)" DIR
