= Urbanus (usurper) =

Possible Roman imperial usurper in 271 or 272

Urbanus was a Roman usurper.

== History ==
Urbanus declared himself emperor in either 271 or 272 AD, during the reign of Aurelian. He likely staged his revolt in Dalmatia. He was quickly defeated. He is possibly fictional.
