= Enmannsche Kaisergeschichte =

Lost historical work

The Enmannsche Kaisergeschichte ('Enmann's History of the Emperors') is a modern term for a hypothetical Latin historical work, written in the 4th century, but now lost.

In 1884, German scholar Alexander Enmann made a comparison of several late Roman historical works and found many similarities, which could not be explained by a direct literary relationship between the extant works (Eine verlorene Geschichte der roemischen Kaiser und das Buch De viris illustribus urbis Romae). Enmann postulated a theory of a lost historical work. This work, referred to as the Kaisergeschichte was not mentioned by any late Roman historians. Enmann argued that it was the common source for authors including Aurelius Victor, Eutropius, and the author of the Historia Augusta.

Until 2023, Enmann's analysis was largely accepted or modified. Although the majority of scholars agreed with Enmann's hypothesis, some, especially Willem den Boer, questioned the existence of the Kaisergeschichte. In 2023, historians Justin A. Stover and George Woudhuysen argued that there was a stronger explanation for the similarities in several Roman historical works from the late fourth and fifth centuries. Stover and Woudhuysen contended that the Historia written by Sextus Aurelius Victor, was used as source material by contemporary historians, who widely praised it. They further hypothesized that the two current works attributed to Victor that survive are both epitomes of the much longer Historia. These arguments have been reviewed mostly positive but have also met with criticism and are now a topic of debate.

If Enmann's hypothesis is correct, the Kaisergeschichte was a brief historical work. It covered the time from emperor Augustus to 337 or 357. If it existed, it was used by the three historians mentioned above, and Festus, Jerome, and the anonymous author of the Epitome de Caesaribus.

== See also ==
- Thirty Tyrants (Roman)
- Augustan History
