= Licinian =

Roman emperor in 251

Roman emperor
- Reign: c. 250 (against Decius)
- Predecessor: Decius
- Successor: Decius
- Died: c. 250
Names
- Julius Valens Licinianus

Julius Valens Licinianus, known as Licinian, was a Roman usurper in 250. Apparently, Licinian, who was a senator, had the support of the Roman Senate and parts of the population when he initiated an uprising against Decius, who was fighting the Goths. However, Valerian, who had been left in charge in Rome by Decius, had little trouble in suppressing the rebellion.

It is possible that Licinian was the same Valens Senior, who usurped the purple in Rome during the absence of the Emperor Decius in the war against the Goths (250), and who was quickly executed.
