= Piso (general under Macrianus) =

Roman general

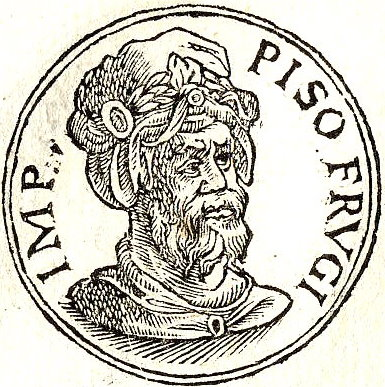
Fantasy depiction of Piso in Guillaume Rouillé's Promptuarii Iconum Insigniorum

Lucius Calpurnius Piso Frugi (fl. 261 AD) was probably a Roman general whom the imperial pretender Macrianus Major sent to suppress the governor of Achaia, Valens Thessalonicus. His existence is attested only by the unreliable Historia Augusta, which labels Piso as one of several usurpers who plagued the reign of Emperor Gallienus. While some historians grudgingly regard Piso as a historical figure, many reported details of his life, including his usurpation, are dismissed as fabrications.

== Background ==
In June 260, Persian king Shāpūr I defeated and took Emperor Valerian captive at Edessa in Roman Mesopotamia. Valerian's son, Gallienus who had ruled jointly with his father, immediately became the sole Roman emperor. Gallienus, however, ruled the western portion of the empire and was far away from the threats of the East.

Without Valerian in the east, the border populations and their legions felt vulnerable and elected their own emperors to guarantee they would have leaders against foreign threats. After the capture of Valerian, the legions of Pannonia threw off their allegiance to Gallienus and proclaimed Ingenuus, their military commander, emperor. After Gallienus put down this rebellion and returned to Italy to deal with the Alemannic invasion, another Roman general in Pannonia, Regalianus, would attempt to take the throne.

Meanwhile, in Syria, Macrianus Major, one of Valerian's officers in charge of the treasury took advantage of the situation, gained the support of a key military commander, Balista, and claimed the throne for his two sons, Macrianus Minor and Quietus. In 261, after securing control of Egypt, Syria and Asia Minor, Macrianus Major and his son Macrianus Minor decided that they would travel west to Italy to confront and overthrow Gallienus. In their path to Italy, however, were the governors of the various Roman provinces with their military forces. One such governor remaining loyal to Emperor Gallienus was Valens Thessalonicus of the province of Achaea.

== Piso’s revolt ==
To eliminate the threat of Valens and clear the track east, Macrianus Major and his son sent Piso to Achaea to kill Valens.

Little, however, is actually known about Piso. The only source of information about Piso and his mission is the unreliable Historia Augusta. Piso is said to be a descendant of the Calpurnia gens/Calpurnii Pisones and to have received the title Frugi for his severe virtues.

The details of Piso's actions at the time are also unclear. Ultimately, Piso journeyed only as far as Thessaly where he pronounced himself emperor assuming the name "Thessalicus," most likely a confused reference to Valens Thessalonicus. Later that same year Piso's short revolt was ended when he was killed by Valen's troopers.

Valens actions during this same period are also unclear. Sometime during 261 as Piso was on his way to kill him, Valens also claimed the Roman throne. It is not clear if this was done to enhance his standing as he confronted the threat from the east or if the title and position was imposed on him by his soldiers. Regardless, Valens' soldiers sought out and killed the usurper Piso and later assassinated him for reasons unknown.

== Aftermath ==
Macrianus Major and his son attempted to march their army to confront Gallienus, but were defeated in Thrace in 261 by Aureolus, Gallienus’ Imperial Horsemaster. Macrianus and his son were killed in the battle. According to Joannes Zonaras, their army was encircled by Aureolus and surrendered. Macrianus asked to be killed with his son to avoid being taken captive.

Quietus who had remained Roman Mesopotamia was besieged in Emesa in 261 and killed by Odaenathus of Palmyra, a loyal client king of the Romans.
