= Macriani =

Macriani is the name of three Roman usurpers – a father and two sons – who tried to gain the Roman throne from Emperor Gallienus. All three died in 261 A.D. They were:

- Macrianus Major, the father
- Macrianus Minor, first son
- Quietus, second son
