= Magnus (usurper) =

Roman imperial usurper (died 235)

Gaius Petronius Magnus (died 235 AD) was a Roman senator of consular rank and a Roman usurper. After the death of Emperor Severus Alexander there was much ill-feeling in the Senate about the elevation of Maximinus Thrax to the throne. A group of officers and senators under the leadership of Magnus plotted to overthrow Maximinus. Their plan was to have soldiers destroy the bridge over the river Rhine, after Maximinus had brought the army across during his campaign against the Germans. Maximinus would be left stranded on the north bank of the Rhine, at the mercy of the Germans. Before it was realized, the plan was discovered and all conspirators executed.
