= Aurelius Theodotus =

3rd century Roman eques and general

(Praefectus Aegypti) Governor of Egypt
- Reign: 262–263
- Predecessor: Lucius Mussius Aemilianus
- Successor: Gaius Claudius Firmus?
- Born: Roman Egypt, 3rd century
- Issue: Causisoleus (Brother)

Aurelius Theodotus was a Roman eques and general who flourished during the earlier part of the third century AD. He was assigned by the emperor Gallienus to suppress the rebellion of Lucius Mussius Aemilianus, after which he served as praefectus or governor of Roman Egypt; Guido Bastianini dates his tenure from 262 to 263.

The Historia Augusta tells that Theodotus was of Egyptian origin, and that he had a brother named Causisoleus.

During the 260s the Roman Empire was subjected to the pressure of various enemies from without and within. One of these was Aemilianus, who was proclaimed emperor by the army in Egypt in 261. Because Egypt was the granary for the city of Rome, in 262 Theodotus was sent against him. Theodotus defeated and captured Aemilianus near Thebes, and sent him to Gallienus who had him executed.

While praefectus, Theodotus also suppressed the revolt of Memor, who had been one of Aemilianus's supporters. Following this, some magistrates complained to the emperor about how Theodotus had suppressed the revolt; however, Gallienus decided in favor of Theodotus and closed the case.

Political offices
Preceded by Lucius Mussius Aemilianus	Prefect of Egypt; 262–263	Succeeded by Gaius Claudius Firmus
