= Regalian =

Roman emperor or usurper (died 260/261)

- Usurper of the Roman Empire
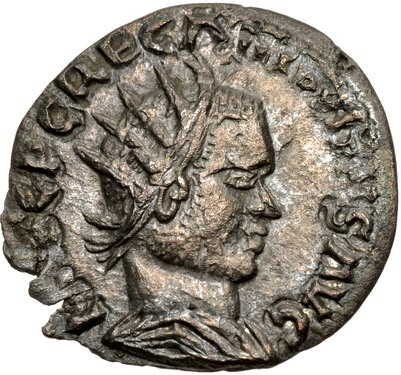
- Antoninianus of Regalianus, marked: imp c p c regalianvs avg
- Reign: c. 260, 260–261 or 261
- Predecessor: Gallienus
- Successor: Gallienus
- Died: 260/261 (aged c. 45/46); Carnuntum, Pannonia Superior
- Spouse: Sulpicia Dryantilla

P. C. Regalianus (died 260/261), known in English as Regalian, was Roman usurper for a few months in 260 and/or 261, during the Crisis of the Third Century, a period of intense political instability in the Roman Empire. Regalian was acclaimed emperor by the troops along the Danube river, a region of the empire that frequently experienced barbarian raids, probably in the hope that he might be able to secure the frontier.

Accounts by surviving literary sources concerning Regalian are brief and few in number, and are mostly considered unreliable. The Historia Augusta relates that he was of Dacian descent, and a descendant of the Dacian king Decebalus, but this is mostly rejected in modern scholarship. Regalianus was married to Sulpicia Dryantilla, a woman from a prestigious senatorial family, which instead points to Regalian also being of high-ranking Roman descent. Regalian's acclamation as emperor was in the wake of a previous usurpation attempt by Ingenuus, also proclaimed by the Danube troops, that had been defeated by emperor Gallienus (r. 253–268). Unlike Ingenuus, and revolutionary for an imperial claimant, Regalian founded his own mint at Carnuntum, his seat of power. He minted coins of himself and his wife, though they were typically of poor quality.

Regalian's local usurpation of power was beneficial for Gallienus, as it allowed the emperor to focus his attention on defending Italy from an invasion by the Alemanni while Regalian was occupied fighting the barbarians in Illyria. After a brief "rule" of several months at Carnuntum, Regalian was killed. How exactly he met his end is not entirely clear, but the most commonly accepted theory is that he died during a raid of Carnuntum by the Roxolani, possibly aided by a contingent of his men who had grown to oppose him.

== Background ==
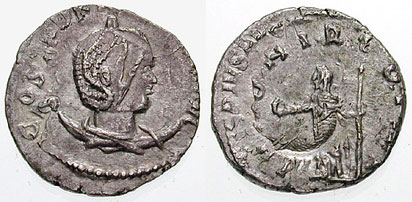
Antoninianus of Regalian's wife, Sulpicia Dryantilla

Very little of Regalian's life and career is recorded in surviving literary sources. The often unreliable Historia Augusta, a late Roman collection of imperial biographies, records that Regalian was of Dacian origin, and a descendant of Decebalus, the king of Dacia who had been defeated with great effort by emperor Trajan in 105–107. This story is unlikely to be true, and it is more likely that Regalian was a Roman of senatorial rank, given that he was married to Sulpicia Dryantilla, a woman of a prestigious senatorial family. The full name of Regalian, P. C. Regalianus, only appears on his coinage. Some ancient historians even got this name wrong: Eutropius (late fourth century) called him 'Trebellianus' and Aurelius Victor (also late fourth century) called him 'Regillianus', 'Religilianus' and 'Religianus'. Aurelius Victor's misspellings might reflect deliberate distortion or the pronunciation of his name in Vulgar Latin.

Given the scarcity of the source material, Regalian's full name cannot be ascertained beyond the abbreviated two first names. It is possible that the P stands for the praenomen Publius. The C might stand for the nomen Cassius, given that Regalian could be related to the earlier suffect consul C. Cassius Regallianus, Cornelius or Claudius, but it has also been suggested to stand for a second praenomen Gaius (which was traditionally shorted archaically as "C." for "Caius" as it was originally spelled). Charles Theodore Beauvais de Preau believed based on engravings of coins by Hendrick Goltzius that his named was "Quintus Nonius Regillianus" but Joseph Hilarius von Eckhel thought that they instead belonged to some other Princeps and that the coins were the result of ignorant moneyers who failed to make legible coins, John Yonge Akerman noted that the standard of the cross described to be on the mint makes dates them to a later period, his opinion was that this supposed "Nonius" would have been a usurper during the reign of Constantius II.

== Career ==
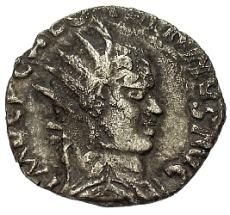
Another antoninianus of Regalian

The Historia Augusta states that Regalian was a military commander, dux, in Illyricum, promoted to this post by emperor Valerian (r. 253–260) but also that he was proclaimed emperor by his troops in Moesia, a neighbouring region. This information cannot be regarded as reliable, especially given that it is anachronistic: the position of dux Illyrici did not yet exist at the time of Regalian. Given his wife's high rank, it is more likely that Regalian was a provincial governor, perhaps of Pannonia Superior. These provinces along the Danube suffered from frequent barbarian raids, which often left them at odds with the central imperial government. Shortly prior to Regalianus' own claim to imperial power, the usurper Ingenuus had been proclaimed in the region in 260, but he had quickly been defeated by the reigning emperor, Gallienus (r. 253–268). It is not clear how much time transpired between the revolt of Ingenuus and Regalian's own acclamation, or if Regalian was involved in the preceding revolt, though most scholars agree that there was an extended hiatus between them. This makes it unclear when exactly Regalian was acclaimed emperor and also, given that he held out for several months, when he died. He was proclaimed emperor either late in 260 or in 261, and his claim to imperial power ended with his defeat and death after several months, either in 260 or 261.

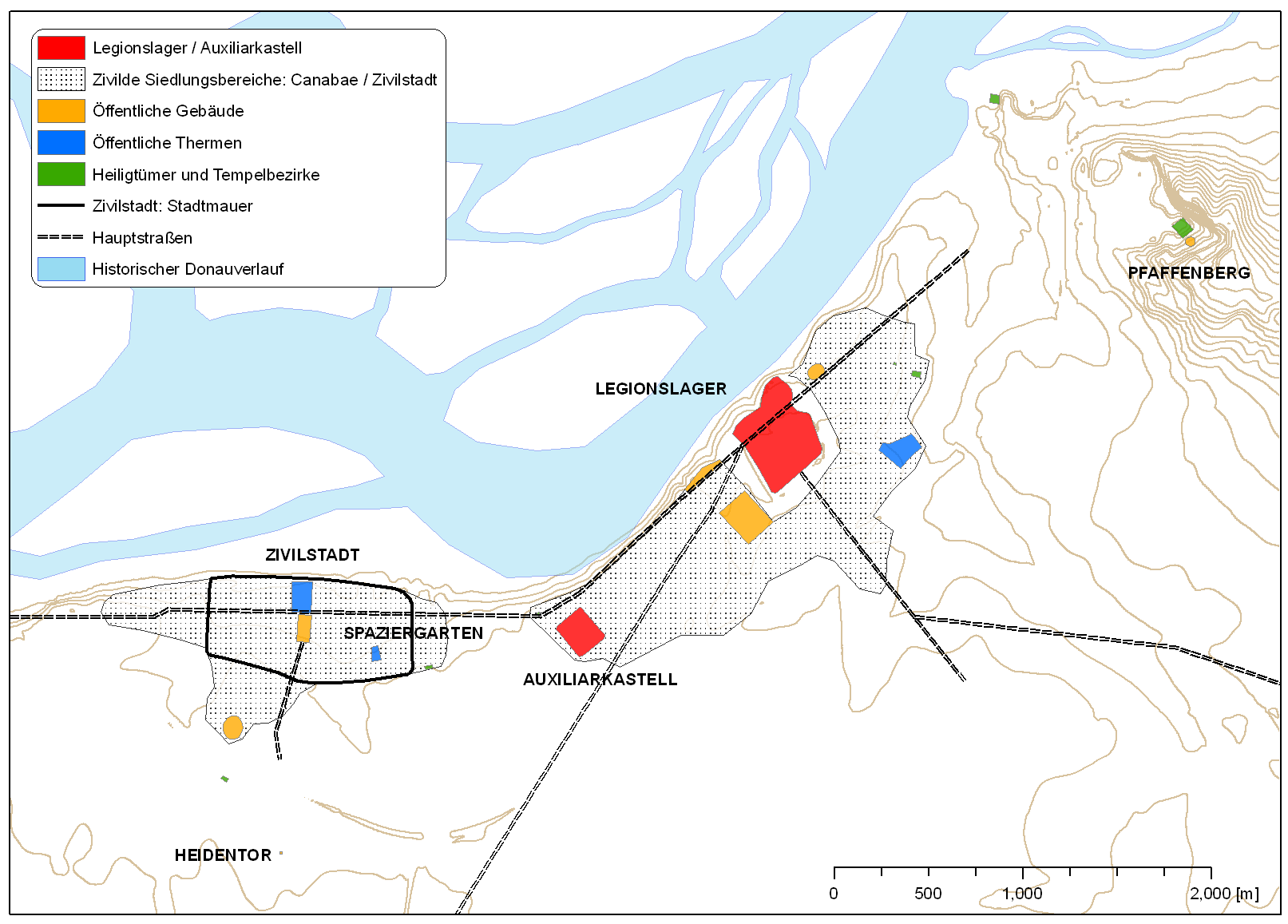
Map of Carnuntum, Regalian's seat of power

After defeating Ingenuus, Gallienus had spent some time reorganising the defenses along the Danube, but had to return to Italy to deal with an invasion by the Alemanni, a Germanic tribe. Shortly after he departed, the Roxolani, a Sarmatian tribe that Gallienus had re-settled within the imperial borders in the Danube region, rebelled and attacked Regalian's forces, whereafter Regalian retreated to the city of Carnuntum. It was only after these events that Regalian was acclaimed emperor by his troops. It is likely that the legionaries of Legio XIV Gemina, which was stationed at Carnuntum, supported the accession of Regalian as they hoped he could help secure the Danube border.

Unlike Ingenuus before him, Regalian minted his own coins at a mint he himself established at Carnuntum, a revolutionary move for an imperial claimant. In addition to his own portrait, Regalian's coins also depict his wife, whom he raised to the rank of Augusta to bolster his position. Most, but not all, of Regalian's coins have the formula AUGG. (implying two rulers, rather than AUG., which implies one) as part of their reverse legend. The plural AUGG. was likely intentional, but the intended meaning is not clear. It is more likely that it refers to the partnership between Regalian and his wife Dryantilla, rather than to some partnership between Regalianus and Gallienus. Paul Pearson has speculated instead that the two might have had a son whom they promoted to co-Augustus. Regalian's acclamation as emperor and later governance in the Danube region was actually beneficial to Gallienus, as it provided the invading Roxolani with a new focus for opposition and allowed Gallienus time to deal with the immediate threat presented by the Alemanni invasion in Italy. All of Regalian's coins were minted at Carnuntum, and they are all overstruck issues, struck on coins minted by earlier emperors of the third century, such as Septimius Severus and Maximinus Thrax. Stylistically, Regalian's coins imitate the coins of the Licinian emperors (Valerian and Gallienus), though they are of lower quality, often in a very rough style and with spelling errors. Some of the coins were so hastily made that the legends of the prior emperor who originally minted the coin is still partially visible, or that the new minting failed to give the coin a visible legend at all. Owing to his brief rule, only a small number of coins (just over 130) minted by Regalian have been found. Most of them are today in private coin collections.

How Regalian was defeated and died is unclear, given that different sources give different answers. The generally accepted theory concerning Regalian's demise, forwarded by the Hungarian archaeologist Jenő Fitz in 1966, is that Regalian was killed in a raid by the Roxolani, perhaps working together with some of his own men, after bravely having fought the rebelling tribe for some time. Other accounts include that Regalian was murdered exclusively by his own troops as the Illyrian provincial population were afraid of retribution from Gallienus (Historia Augusta) or that he was defeated and killed by Gallienus (Eutropius).

== See also ==
- Ingenuus
- Jotapian
- Pacatian
- Silbannacus
- Sponsianus
