= List of Roman usurpers =

The following is a list of usurpers in the Roman Empire —individuals who unsuccessfully claimed and/or attempted to usurp the throne of a ruling emperor (augustus). The ancient term was "tyrant" (Latin: tyrannus), which had negative connotation in and of itself. Usurpation was common during the whole imperial era; virtually all imperial dynasties rose to power through usurpation and conspiracies. The "imperial office" established by Augustus never defined a stable system of succession, and emperors often had to rely solely on military power to survive.

In the Eastern Roman Empire (395–1453), rebellion and usurpation were so notoriously frequent (in the vision of the medieval West, where usurpation was rare) that the modern term "byzantine" became a byword for political intrigue and conspiracy. For usurpation in the Eastern Roman Empire, see List of Byzantine usurpers.

== Usurpers who became legitimate emperors ==
The following individuals began as usurpers, but became the legitimate emperor either by establishing uncontested control of the empire or by confirmation of their position by the Senate or by the legitimate emperor. Emperors marked in bold are those who managed to secure the throne for themselves; all other emperors, unless noted, were murdered in office.

=== First civil war ===
- Galba (68–69)
- Otho (69)
- Vitellius (69)
- **Vespasian** (69–79)

=== Second civil war ===
- Pertinax (193)
- Didius Julianus (193)
- **Septimius Severus** (193–211)

=== Crisis of the Third Century ===
- Macrinus and Diadumenian (217–218)
- Elagabalus (218–222), restored the Severan dynasty
- Maximinus I (235–238)
- Gordian I and Gordian II (238)
- Philip (244–249)
- Decius (249–251)
- Trebonianus Gallus (251–253)
- Aemilian (253)
- Valerian (253–260) ― captured by the Persians
- Claudius Gothicus (268–270) ― died of plague
- Quintillus (270)
- Aurelian (270–275)
- Florian (276)
- Probus (276–282)
- Carus (282–283) ― died in Persia
- **Diocletian** (284–305)

=== 4th–5th centuries ===
- **Constantine I** (306–337)
- Maxentius (306–312)
- Alexander (308–310)
- Nepotianus (350)
- Magnentius (350–353)
- Vetranio (350) ― deposed and spared
- **Julian II** (360–363)
- Procopius (365–366)
- Magnus Maximus and Victor (383–388)

These last emperors of the West Empire were all accepted by the Senate but never recognized as colleagues by the Emperor of the East.

- Constantine III and Constans II (407–411), recognized by Honorius
- Priscus Attalus (409–410)
- Joannes (423–425)
- Petronius Maximus (455)
- Avitus (455–456)
- Majorian (457-461)
- Libius Severus (461–465) ― natural death
- Olybrius (472) ― natural death
- Glycerius (473–474) ― deposed and spared
- Romulus Augustulus (475–476) ― deposed and spared

== Unsuccessful usurpers or rebels ==
=== 1st century rebels ===
All "usurpers" began as rebels, but not all rebels claimed the imperial titles. These early figures rebelled against the emperor, but most likely did not claim the imperial title.

Coin	Name	Emperor	Tenure	Life details & notes	Ref
"Pseudo-Agrippa" Clemens		Tiberius (r. 14–37)	AD 16	Former slave of Agrippa Postumus, the grandson of Augustus. Pretended to be him and marched to Rome to claim the throne.	
L. Arruntius Camillus Scribonianus		Claudius (r. 41–54)	AD 42	Consul in AD 32, appointed legate of Dalmatia in AD 41. He rebelled with the support of Vinicianus, but was killed within five days.	
	L. Clodius Macer	Nero (r. 54–68); Galba (r. 68–69)	c. May–October AD 68	Rebelled against Nero and proclaimed himself propraetor; continued his revolt after his death, but was put to death by Galba	
C. Nymphidius Sabinus		Nero (r. 54–68); Galba (r. 68–69)	c. June AD 68	Nero's Praetorian prefect, plotted to usurp the throne after Nero's suicide, claiming to be the illegitimate son of Caligula. Killed by the Praetorian Guard as Galba approached Rome.	
"Pseudo-Nero"		Otho (r. 69)	AD 69	In Achaia, modern Greece; the first Nero imposter.	
"Pseudo-Nero"		Titus (r. 79–81)	AD 79	A rebel named Terentius Maximus who claimed to be Nero reborn; supported by the Parthians in Syria.	
"Pseudo-Nero"		Domitian (r. 81–96)	AD 88	An obscure figure; supported by the Parthians.	
L. Antonius Saturninus		Domitian (r. 81–96)	January AD 89	Governor of Germania Superior, started a rebellion in Mainz. He was killed by Lappius Maximus.	

=== 2nd century ===
Coin	Name	Emperor	Tenure	Life details & notes	Ref
C. Avidius Cassius		Marcus Aurelius (r. 161–180)	April – July 175 (3 months and 6 days, in Syria)	Suffect consul in 166, governor of Syria. Declared himself emperor upon the rumor that Marcus had died, continued his revolt even upon learning that he was alive.	
	C. Pescennius Niger	Septimius Severus (r. 193–211)	April 193 – April 194 (1 year, in Antioch)	Governor of Syria and former suffect consul. Proclaimed himself emperor after the murder of Pertinax and the elevation of Julianus. Killed by Septimius Severus while attempting to flee to Parthia.	
	D. Clodius Albinus	Septimius Severus (r. 193–211)	December 195 – 19 February 197 (1 year and 2 months, West)	Governor of Britain and former suffect consul. Proclaimed emperor in April 193, but allied himself with Septimius Severus, who gave him the title of caesar (heir). Rebelled after learning of the appointment of Caracalla as Severus' new caesar. Killed at the Battle of Lugdunum.	

=== 3rd century ===
Coin	Name	Emperor	Tenure	Life details & notes
Verus		Elagabalus (r. 218–222)	c. 218 (Syria)	Senator and commander of the Legio III Gallica; proclaimed emperor in Tyre.
Gellius Maximus		Elagabalus (r. 218–222)	c. 218 (Syria)	Son of a doctor; commander of the Legio IV Scythica.
Taurinius		Severus Alexander (r. 222–235)	c. 232 (Syria)	Former suffect consul; proclaimed emperor against his will. Drowned himself in the Euphrates to avoid punishment.
Seleucus (Gaius) Julius Antonius Seleucus		Severus Alexander (r. 222–235)	c. 232 (Syria)	Governor in Moesia; mentioned by Polemius Silvius. Probably a descendant of king Antiochus IV of Commagene and Marcus Antonius.
Ovinius Camillus		Severus Alexander (r. 222–235)		Fictitious usurper of the Historia Augusta
Magnus; Gaius Petronius Magnus		Maximinus Thrax (r. 235–238)	late 235 (in Germania)	A patritian ex-consul; said to have been hailed emperor after Alexander's murder. Herodian suggests that he was actually incriminated.
Quartinus (Titus Fulvius) Quartinus		Maximinus Thrax (r. 235–238)	late 235 / early 236 (Note: He reigned six months according to the Historia Augusta, but this must be an exageration. Herodian's narrative suggest he was killed rather quickly.) (in Mesopotamia)	Ex-consul; reluctantly hailed by troops loyal to Alexander. He was later killed by the same man who proclaimed him emperor.
Sabinian; Marcus Asinius Sabinianus		Gordian III (r. 238–244)	240 (Africa)	Ex-consul and proconsul of Africa; killed by the governor of Mauretania.
	Pacatian; Marcus Fulvius Ru(fus) Jotapianus	Philip the Arab (r. 244–249)	c. 248 / 249 (Danube)	Commander in Moesia or Pannonia and a former consul; defeated by Decius and killed by his own soldiers shortly after. His rule came on (or shortly after) Rome's 1000th anniversary.
	Jotapian; Marcus Fulvius Ru(fus) Jotapianus	Philip the Arab (r. 244–249)	c. 249 (Levant)	A member of Near East nobility, perhaps related to the ancient kings of Commagene, claimed descent from Alexander the Great. Revolted for several months in Syria and Cappadocia in response to the heavy taxation policies of Priscus, Philip's brother and governor of the East. Like many, Jopatian was eventually killed by his own soldiers.
	Silbannacus; Mar(cius?) Silbannacus	Philip the Arab (r. 244–249)	c. 249 (?) (Gaul?)	Only known for two coins, possibly an usurper in Gaul (or perhaps Rome). According to one view, he may be related to Marcia Otacilia Severa, Philip's wife.
	Sponsianus	Philip the Arab (r. 244–249)	c. 249 (??) (Balkans?)	Existence disputed, only known for a few coins found in Transylvania that reuse old Republican denarii.
Licinian; Julius Valens Licinianus		Decius (r. 249–251)	c. 251	Briefly mentioned by Aurelius Victor; fictionalized as Valens Senior in the Historia Augusta. Defeated by the (future emperor) Valerian.
Priscus; Titus Julius Priscus		Decius (r. 249–251)	c. 251	Governor of Macedonia, proclaimed himself emperor in Philippopolis during a siege by Goths.
	Uranius Antoninus; Lucius Julius Aurelius Sulpicius Severus Uranius Antoninus	Valerian (r. 253–260)	c. 253 / 254 (Syria)	Born as Sampsiceramus, initially a priest of the cult of Elagabal, likely a descendant of Elagabalus. Proclaimed emperor after successfully defending Emesa from the Persian forces of Shapur I; fate unknown. Most likely the same "Uranius" said to have revolted against Severus Alexander.
Ingenuus		Gallienus (r. 253–268)	c. 260 (Pannonia)	Governor of Pannonia, proclaimed in Sirmium by the legions of Moesia after the capture of Valerian, defeated and killed and in Mursa.
	Regalianus; P(ublius) C(assius) Regalianus	Gallienus (r. 253–268)	c. 260 (Pannonia)	A native of Dacia, commander in Illyricum. Proclaimed emperor in Moesia but killed shortly after, perhaps by his own troops upon Gallienus' arrival.
	Macrianus Minor; Titus Fulvius Junius Macrianus	Gallienus (r. 253–268)	c. 260 – 261 (in the East)	Sons of Macrianus Major, Valerian's quartermaster general, who was proclaimed emperor by the praetorian prefect Balista but refused due to his age and health, instead proclaiming his two sons, both legates, as joint emperors and consuls. They quickly took over most of the East (Egypt, Syria and Asia) while Gallienus fought in the West. Both Macrianus were eventually defeated at Illyricum by Aureolus, while Quietus, the younger brother, was sieged by Odaenathus in Emesa with Ballista and killed.
	Quietus; Titus Fulvius Junius Quietus	Gallienus (r. 253–268)	c. 260 – 261 (in the East)	Sons of Macrianus Major, Valerian's quartermaster general, who was proclaimed emperor by the praetorian prefect Balista but refused due to his age and health, instead proclaiming his two sons, both legates, as joint emperors and consuls. They quickly took over most of the East (Egypt, Syria and Asia) while Gallienus fought in the West. Both Macrianus were eventually defeated at Illyricum by Aureolus, while Quietus, the younger brother, was sieged by Odaenathus in Emesa with Ballista and killed.
Valens "Thessalonicus"		Gallienus (r. 253–268)	c. 261 (Achaia/Macedonia)	Proconsul of Achaia, probably gained his nickname after defending Thessalonica. Proclaimed emperor during his confrontation against Piso, one of Macrianus' generals. Valens defeated him, but was killed by his own soldiers shortly after.
Aemilian II; Lucius Mussius Aemilianus "Aegippius"		Gallienus (r. 253–268)	c. 261 – 262 (Egypt)	A distinguished officer who supported the revolt of Macrianus, claimed imperial power after their deaths, probably to avoid punishment. Defeated by Aurelius Theodotus.
Memor		Gallienus (r. 253–268)	c. 262 (?)	A mauri mentioned by Zosimus and Peter the Patrician (c. 550 AD). Likely a follower of Macrianus, he may have never actually claimed imperial power.
Aureolus (Manius Acilius) Aeolus		Gallienus (r. 253–268)	268 (Northern Italy)	Native of Dacia and Gallienus' right hand man. Defeated the usurpers Ingenuus (260) and Macrianus (261), but later allied himself with Postumus against Gallienus. He proclaimed himself emperor following Gallienus' death, but was quickly killed by Claudius' troops after surrendering to him.
Thirty Tyrants		Gallienus (r. 253–268)		Thirty-two pretenders who appear in the Historia Augusta, most of them fictitious.
==== Gallic Empire (260–274) ==== The Gallic Empire was breakaway part of the Roman Empire that, unlike most usurper-ran territories, functioned de facto as a separate state from 260 to 274. It had its own capital (Trier), a clear succession of emperors, its own pair of yearly-elected consuls, and even its own usurpers. At its height, the Empire controlled all Western European provinces: Hispania, Gaul and Britannia. The term "Gallic Empire" and "Gallic Emperor" are modern conventions; its rulers continued to use the standard imperial titulature without changes.
	Postumus; Marcus Cassianius Latinius Postumus	Gallienus (r. 253–268)	c. 260 – April/August 269 (about 9 years)	Governor of Germania, proclaimed emperor after a military victory, after which he killed Gallienus' son Saloninus at Cologne. Established a court in Trier, but made no moves against the Emperor in Rome. He was killed by his troops in the aftermath of Laelian's usurpation, as he did not allow them to sack Mainz.
	Laelian; Ulpius Cornelius Laelianus	Claudius Gothicus (r. 268–270)	mid-269 (Germania, 2 months or less)	General under Postumus, revolted in Mainz in February or June 269, possibly in coordination with Claudius's forces, which constantly attacked Southern Germania. He was related to the Hispanic emperor Trajan (r. 98–117), which made him earn support from that region. Laelian was quickly defeated by Postumus; Hispania switched allegiance to Claudius II shortly after.
	Marius; Marcus Aurelius Marius	Claudius Gothicus (r. 268–270)	c. 269 (a few months, more than Laelian)	A blacksmith who was proclaimed emperor in Mainz after Laelian and Postumus' demise, but was killed shortly afterward. Ancient sources give him a reign of only a couple of days, but this is impossible given the amount of coinage produced during his reign.
	Victorinus; Marcus Piavonius Victorinus	Claudius Gothicus (r. 268–270)	c. 269 – 271 (about 3 years)	Proclaimed emperor after Marius' death with the support of his mother Victoria, a wealthy noblewoman who probably contributed to the fall of Postumus. Failed to maintain Hispania and faced revolts in central Germania. Killed by one of his officers, whose wife Victorinus had supposedly seduced.
	Domitian II; Domitianus	Aurelian (r. 270–275)	c. 271 (very briefly)	Obscure figure that briefly rebelled in Gaul, perhaps against Victorinus.
	Tetricus; Gaius Esuvius Tetricus	Aurelian (r. 270–275)	c. 271 – 274 (about 3 years)	Governor of Aquitania; proclaimed emperor at Bordeaux with the support of Victoria. He surrendered to Aurelian after the Battle of Châlons, although Tetricus appears to have been secretly arranged his abdication with the Emperor, who pardon him and appointed him as governor of Lucania (Southern Italy).
	Tetricus II; Gaius Esuvius Tetricus	Aurelian (r. 270–275)	c. 273 – 274 (Caesar under Tetricus I)	Young son of Tetricus, almost nothing known except that he lived on to have a distinguished senatorial career. There is some debate on whether he was proclaimed augustus on the final weeks on the Gallic empire, as the evidence (coins) for this are rare and of disputed authenticity.
Faustinus		Aurelian (r. 270–275)	274	Governor of Gallia Belgica, rebelled against Tetricus, who was forced to ask Aurelian for help. Not known if he actually claimed the imperial title.
==== Palmyrene Empire (271–273) ==== The Palmyrene Empire was a short-lived breakaway state centered around the city of Palmyra. It encompassed the Roman provinces of Syria Palaestina, Arabia Petraea, and Egypt, as well as large parts of Asia Minor. Chaos consumed the East following the capture of Valerian and the revolts of Macrianus, but the territories were eventually pacified by Odaenathus, who was named Dux Romanorum ("leader of the Romans") and Corrector totius orientis (essentially "governor of all the East") by Gallienus, effectively turning the territory into a semi-independent entity. Odaenathus was proclaimed "King of Kings" (rex regum), but remained loyal to the Emperor. He was murdered with his son Hairan in 267. The throne went to Odaenathus' young son Vaballathus, who reigned under the regency of her mother Zenobia.
	Vaballathus; Lucius Julius Aurelius Septimius Vaballathus Athenodorus	Aurelian (r. 270–275)	272 (Note: The exact chronology of Zenobia's usurpation is unclear. Their rule in Egypt certainly lasted from c. April to c. June, as papyri show that Aurelian stopped being recognized in Egypt between 17 April and 24 June. Zenobia and her son may have been already using the imperial titles since late 271.) (1 year)	Young son of Zenobia and Odaenathus, succeeded his father as dux, corrector and rex of Palmyra with the addition of the titles consul and imperator, although all real power was held by Zenobia.
	Zenobia	Aurelian (r. 270–275)	272 (1 year)	A remarkable and cultured stateswoman; wife of Odaenathus and mother of Vaballathus, de facto ruler of the East since 267, assumed the title of augusta in 271/272, after conquering Egypt. She first attempted to rule as a co-equal to Aurelian, with no results. She was spared and retired with his son, later marrying a senator.
Antiochus		Aurelian (r. 270–275)	273 (very briefly)	Son of Zenobia, perhaps still a child. Proclaimed emperor during a revolt against the restored Roman rule in Palmyra. He was spared.
Septimius		Aurelian (r. 270–275)	c. 271 (Dalmatia)	Killed by his own men. Briefly mentioned by Zosimus and Victor.
Urbanus		Aurelian (r. 270–275)	???	Nothing known, only briefly mentioned by Zosimus.
	Bonosus	Probus (r. 276–282)	280 (Germania)	Commanders in Germany, proclaimed emperors at Cologne (alternatively, they were proclaimed separately, but soon joined forces). Bonosus committed suicide after facing Probus' army, while Proculus was either killed in battle or executed soon after.
	Proculus	Probus (r. 276–282)	280 (Germania)	Commanders in Germany, proclaimed emperors at Cologne (alternatively, they were proclaimed separately, but soon joined forces). Bonosus committed suicide after facing Probus' army, while Proculus was either killed in battle or executed soon after.
	Saturninus; Gaius Julius Sallustius Saturninus Fortunatianus	Probus (r. 276–282)	c. 281 (Egypt)	A former consul native of Africa and commander in the East, revolted in Antioch. Hoped to gain recognition by Probus, with no results. He was killed by his own soldiers near Apamea in the ensuing confrontation.
	Julian of Pannonia; Marcus Aurelius Sabinus Julianus	Carinus (r. 283–285)	c. November 284 – c. February 285 (Pannonia, 3 months or less)	Governor of Venice, revolted in north-eastern Italy after the death of Numerian, but was quickly defeated near Verona by Carinus, who used Julian's soldiers to fight the approaching Diocletian. Sometimes treated as two emperors, one Marcus Aurelius Julianus, in Pannonia, and another Sabinius Julianus, in Italy.
Amandus (rebel)		Diocletian (r. 286–305, East)	285 (Gaul)	Revolted in Gaul after the death of Carinus with Aelianus; quickly killed by Maximian. Once thought to be an usurper who minted coins in their names.
	Domitian III; Lucius Domitius Domitianus	Diocletian (r. 286–305, East)	c. 297 (Egypt)	Proclaimed in Egypt, almost nothing known. Chronology uncertain.
	Aurelius Achilleus	Diocletian (r. 286–305, East)	297–298 (Egypt)	Proclaimed in Egypt, almost nothing known.
	Carausius; Marcus Aurelius Mausaeus Carausius	Maximian (r. 286–305, West)	286–293 (7 years, in Britain)	Naval commander of humble birth, rebelled and proclaimed himself emperor in Britain (and Northern Gaul) after being sentenced to death for allegedly keeping the booty of the pirates he fought. Murdered by Allectus after a military defeat.
	Allectus	Maximian (r. 286–305, West)	293–296 (3 years, in Britain)	Killed by the praetorian prefect Asclepiodotus by orders of Constantius I.

=== 4th century ===
Coin	Name	Emperor	Tenure	Life details & notes	Ref
Eugenius		Diocletian (r. 286–305, East)	c. 303 (Syria)	Commander in Seleucia, proclaimed emperor by his troops but killed shortly after in Antioch.	
	Maximian; Marcus Aurelius Valerius Maximianus (3rd reign)	Maxentius (r. 306–312, Italy/Africa)	mid 310 (a few weeks, Gaul)	Former friend of Diocletian and co-founder of the Tetrarchy, abdicated at the instigation of Diocletian in 305, but was re-appointed emperor by his son Maxentius after seizing power in Rome. Forced to abdicate again by Constantine I after a failed attempt to overthrow his son. Rebelled again at Arles while Constantine was battling the Franks on the Rhine. He was ultimately betrayed by his daughter Fausta (Constantine's wife), and executed by July.	
Calocaerus (?)		Constantine I (r. 324–337)	c. 334 (Cyprus)	Led a revolt in Cyprus, probably not an usurper.	
Silvanus		Constantius II (r. 350–361)	355 (28 days, Gaul)	Son of the magister militum Bonitus.	
	Carausius II (?)	Constantius II (r. 350–361)	between 354 and 358 (?)	Questioned existence, only known for a few coins with the name "Carausius Caesar". Likely not an actual usurper nor leader.	
Firmus		Valentinian I (r. 364–375, West)	c. 372 – 375 (Africa)	A Moor; likely the same "Firmus" fictionalized in the Historia Augusta.	

=== 5th century ===
Coin	Name	Emperor	Tenure	Life details & notes	Ref
Marcus		Honorius (r. 395–423)	406 – 407 (a few months, Britain)	Proclaimed emperor by his troops; killed shortly after by the same troops.	
Gratian		Honorius (r. 395–423)	407 (a few months, Britain)	Proclaimed after the murder of Marcus. Likewise killed by his own troops, who replaced him with Constantine III, who was later recognized by Honorius.	
	Maximus	Honorius (r. 395–423)	409 – 411 c. 420 – 421 (?) (Hispania)	Proclaimed by the magister militum Gerontius during the rebellion of Constantine III, becoming the 5th Western emperor in the same the year (with Honorius, Constantine III, Constans and Priscus Attalus). Defeated and spared by the forces of Honorius, who allowed him to retire. May be the same "Maximus" that rebelled in Spain a decade later, only to be paraded and killed.	
	Jovinus	Honorius (r. 395–423)	411 – 413 (2 years or less, Gaul)	A powerful noble from Gaul, proclaimed emperor with support of the Barbarian kings Gundahar, Goar and Athaulf, as well as the former puppet-emperor Attalus of Rome. However, he lost Athaulf's support after allying himself with his enemy Sarus the Goth, leading to his downfall at the hands of Honorius' prefect Dardanus.	
	Sebastianus	Honorius (r. 395–423)	411 – 413 (2 years or less, Gaul)	Brother of Jovinus, made co-emperor about a year after his brother's rebellion. Killed by Athaulf shortly before Jovinus' capture and execution.	
Heraclianus		Honorius (r. 395–423)	c. June 412 – 7 March 413 (8 months or more, Gaul?)	The general that killed Stilicho, the power behind the throne, and defeated the usurper Priscus Attalus. Killed during his invasion of Italy.	
	Priscus Attalus (2nd reign)	Honorius (r. 395–423)	414 – 415 (1 year or less, Gaul)	Former senator and puppet-emperor at Rome (409–410), a brief usurpation supported by king Alaric. His successor Athaulf attempted the same, proclaiming Attalus emperor a second time, but this ended with the same result. Remarkably, he was spared by Honorius, who only cut his thumbs and forefingers.	

=== 6th century ===
Name	Emperor	Tenure	Life details & notes	Ref
Masties	Zeno (r. 474–491, East)	c. 476 – 516+ (over 40 years, Aurès Kingdom)	Berber governor; perhaps awarded the title of dux as a child, as he claimed to hold the title for at least 67 years. Revolted and assumed the title of imperator shortly after 476, later claiming to have ruled over the "Romans and Maurians" for 40 years. Dates uncertain.	
Masties	Anastasius I (r. 491–518, East)	c. 476 – 516+ (over 40 years, Aurès Kingdom)	Berber governor; perhaps awarded the title of dux as a child, as he claimed to hold the title for at least 67 years. Revolted and assumed the title of imperator shortly after 476, later claiming to have ruled over the "Romans and Maurians" for 40 years. Dates uncertain.	
Burdunellus	Anastasius I (r. 491–518, East)	496 (Hispania)	Referred to as Hispanic "tyrants" in sources; nothing known. Burdunellus means "Little Mule", so it may not even be his real name.	
Peter	Anastasius I (r. 491–518, East)	506 (Hispania)	Referred to as Hispanic "tyrants" in sources; nothing known. Burdunellus means "Little Mule", so it may not even be his real name.	

== See also ==
- List of Byzantines usurpers
- List of Trapezuntine usurpers

== Bibliography ==
- Kienast, Dietmar; Werner Eck & Matthäus Heil (2017) [1990]. Römische Kaisertabelle (in German) (6th ed.). Darmstadt: WBG. ISBN 978-3-534-26724-8.
- Hornblower, Simon; Spawforth, Antony; Eidinow, Esther (2012). The Oxford Classical Dictionary. Oxford University Press. ISBN 978-0-19-954556-8.
- Jones, A. H. M.; Martindale, J. R.; Morris, John, eds. (1971–1992). Prosopography of the Later Roman Empire. Cambridge: Cambridge University Press.
- Adkins, Lesley; Adkins, Roy A. (2014). "Emperors". Handbook to Life in Ancient Rome. New York: Infobase Publishing. pp. 27–37. ISBN 9780816074822.
- Craven, Maxwell (2019). The Imperial Families of Ancient Rome. Fonthill Media. ISBN 978-1781557389.
- Kienast, Dietmar; Werner Eck & Matthäus Heil (2017) [1990]. Römische Kaisertabelle: Grundzüge einer römischen Kaiserchronologie [Roman imperial table: Basics of the Roman imperial chronology] (in German) (6th ed.). Darmstadt: WBG. ISBN 978-3-534-26724-8.
- Burgess, Richard W. (2014). Roman imperial chronology and early-fourth-century historiography. Historia Einzelschriften. Stuttgart: Steiner. ISBN 978-3-515-10732-7.
- Peachin, Michael (1990). Roman Imperial Titulature and Chronology, A.D. 235–284. Amsterdam: Gieben. ISBN 90-5063-034-0.
- Vagi, David L. (2000). Coinage and History of the Roman Empire, C. 82 B.C.--A.D. 480: History. Taylor & Francis. ISBN 978-1-57958-316-3.
