= Historia Augusta =

Late Roman collection of biographies

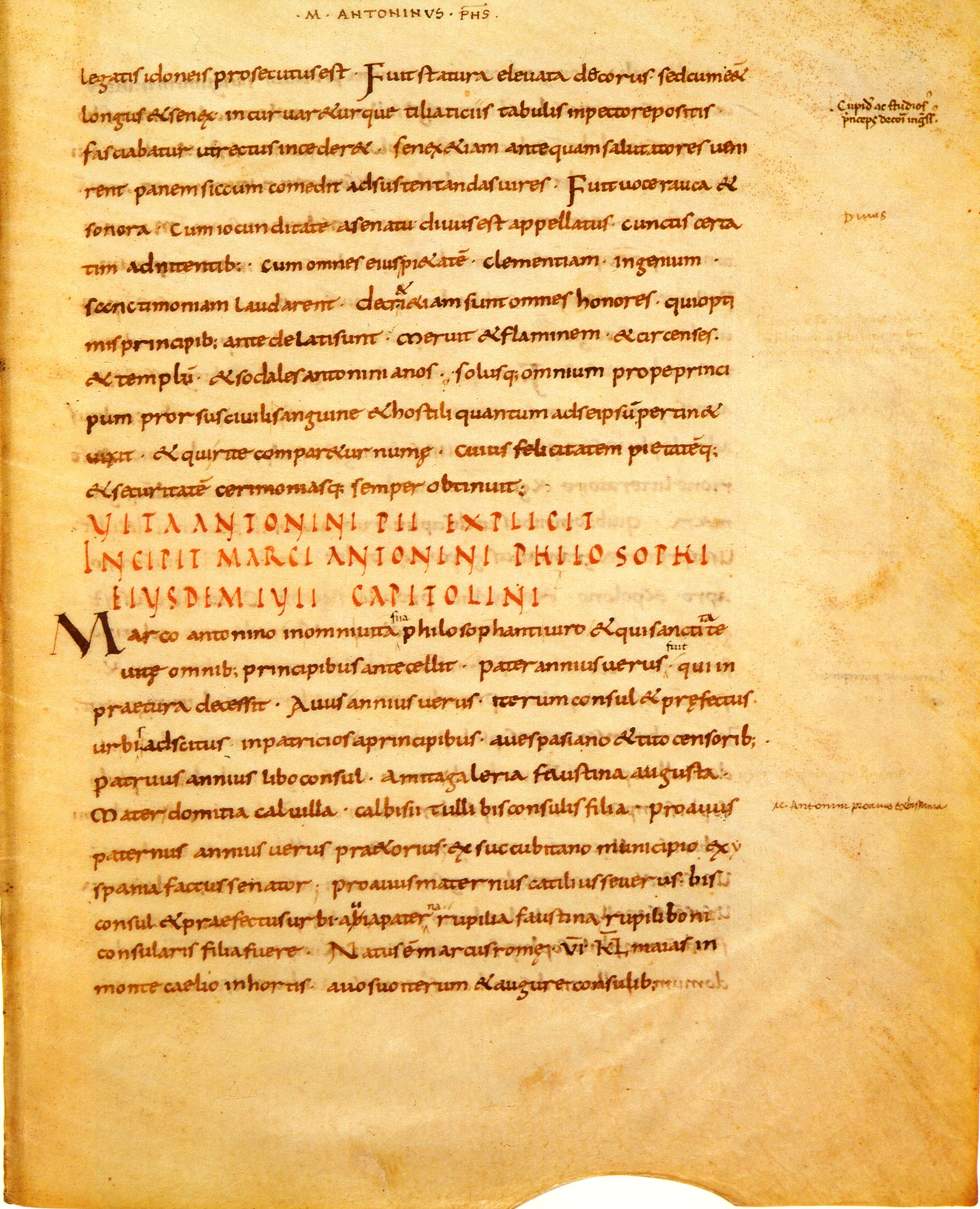
- Page from an early-9th-century manuscript of the Historia Augusta (end of the life of Antoninus Pius and beginning of the life of Marcus Aurelius)
- Author: Disputed
- Original title: Historia Augusta
- Translator: Anthony Birley
- Language: Latin
- Subject: Roman history
- Genre: Biography
- Publication date: Disputed, possibly 4th century AD
- Publication place: Western Roman Empire
- Media type: Manuscript
- Dewey Decimal: 937.06
- LC Class: PA6156.A4
- Original text: Historia Augusta at Latin Wikisource

The Historia Augusta (lit. 'Augustan History') is a late Roman collection of biographies, written in Latin, of the Roman emperors, their junior colleagues, designated heirs and usurpers from 117 to 284. Supposedly modeled on the similar work of Suetonius, The Twelve Caesars, it presents itself as a compilation of works by six different authors, collectively known as the Scriptores Historiae Augustae, written during the reigns of Diocletian and Constantine I and addressed to those emperors or other important personages in Ancient Rome. The collection, as extant, comprises thirty biographies, most of which contain the life of a single emperor, but some include a group of two or more, grouped together merely because these emperors were either similar or contemporaneous.

The true authorship of the work, its actual date, its reliability and its purpose have long been matters for controversy by historians and scholars ever since Hermann Dessau, in 1889, rejected both the date and the authorship as stated within the manuscript. Major problems include the nature of the sources that it used, and how much of the content is pure fiction. For instance, the collection contains in all about 150 alleged documents, including 68 letters, 60 speeches and proposals to the people or the senate, and 20 senatorial decrees and acclamations.

By the second decade of the 21st century, the consensus supported the position that there was only a single author, who wrote either in the late 4th century or the early 5th century, who was interested in blending contemporary issues (political, religious and social) into the lives of the 3rd century emperors. There is further consensus that the author used the fictitious elements in the work to highlight references to other published works, such as to Cicero and Ammianus Marcellinus, in a complex allegorical game. Despite the conundrums, it is the only continuous account in Latin for much of its period and so is continually being re-evaluated. Modern historians are hesitant to abandon it as the book is possibly a source of unique information, besides its overall untrustworthiness.

== Content ==
The work contains biographies of the following emperors:

Roman Emperor + reign	Author	Roman Emperor + reign	Author
Hadrian, 117–138	Aelius Spartianus	Heliogabalus, 218–222	Aelius Lampridius
Lucius Aelius, c. 138	Aelius Spartianus	Severus Alexander, 222–235	Aelius Lampridius
Antoninus Pius, 138–161	Julius Capitolinus	Maximinus Thrax, 235–238	Julius Capitolinus
Marcus Aurelius, 161–180	Julius Capitolinus	Gordian I, Gordian II, Gordian III, 238–244	Julius Capitolinus
Lucius Verus, 161–169	Julius Capitolinus	Pupienus and Balbinus, 238	Julius Capitolinus
Avidius Cassius, 175–176 (usurper)	Vulcacius Gallicanus	lacuna (missing part) 244–253	
Commodus, 177/180–192	Aelius Lampridius	Valerian, 253–260	Trebellius Pollio
Pertinax, 193	Julius Capitolinus	Gallienus, 253–268	Trebellius Pollio
Didius Julianus, 193	Julius Capitolinus	Thirty tyrants, 260	Trebellius Pollio
Septimius Severus, 193–211	Aelius Spartianus	Claudius II Gothicus, 268–270	Trebellius Pollio
Pescennius Niger, 193–194	Aelius Spartianus	Aurelian, 270–275	Flavius Vopiscus
Clodius Albinus, 193–197	Julius Capitolinus	Tacitus, 275–276	Flavius Vopiscus
Caracalla, 198–217	Aelius Spartianus	Probus, 276–282	Flavius Vopiscus
Geta, 209–212	Aelius Spartianus	Four tyrants, 282	Flavius Vopiscus
Macrinus, 217–218	Julius Capitolinus	Carus, Carinus, Numerianus, 282–285	Flavius Vopiscus
Diadumenianus, 218	Aelius Lampridius		

== Title and scope ==
The name Historia Augusta originated with Isaac Casaubon, who produced a critical edition in 1603, working from a complex manuscript tradition with a number of variant versions. The title as recorded on the Codex Palatinus manuscript, written in the 9th century, is Vitae Diversorum Principum et Tyrannorum a Divo Hadriano usque ad Numerianum Diversis compositae ("The Lives of various Emperors and Tyrants from the Divine Hadrian to Numerian by Various Authors"). It is assumed that the work may have been originally called de Vita Caesarum or Vitae Caesarum ("Lives of the Caesars").

How widely the work was circulated in late antiquity is unknown, but its earliest known use was in a Roman History composed by Quintus Aurelius Memmius Symmachus, who served as consul in 485. Lengthy citations from it are found in authors of the 6th and 9th centuries, including Sedulius Scottus who quoted parts of the Marcus Aurelius, the Maximini and the Aurelian within his Liber de Rectoribus Christianis, and the chief manuscripts also date from the 9th or 10th centuries. The six Scriptores – "Aelius Spartianus", "Julius Capitolinus", "Vulcacius Gallicanus", "Aelius Lampridius", "Trebellius Pollio", and "Flavius Vopiscus (of Syracuse)" – dedicate their biographies to Diocletian, Constantine and various private persons, and so ostensibly were all writing around the late 3rd and early 4th century. The first four scriptores are attached to the lives from Hadrian to Gordian III, while the final two are attached to the lives from Valerian to Numerian.

The biographies cover the emperors from Hadrian to Carinus and Numerian. A section covering the reigns of Philip the Arab, Decius, Trebonianus Gallus, Aemilian and all but the end of the reign of Valerian is missing in all the manuscripts, and it has been argued that biographies of Nerva and Trajan have also been lost at the beginning of the work, which may suggest the compilation might have been a direct continuation of Suetonius' The Twelve Caesars. It has been theorized that the mid-3rd-century lacuna might actually be a deliberate literary device of the author or authors, saving the labour of covering Emperors for whom little source material may have been available.

Despite devoting whole books to ephemeral or in some cases non-existent usurpers, there are no independent biographies of the factual, but short reigns of Emperors Quintillus and Florian, whose reigns are merely briefly noted towards the end of the biographies of their respective predecessors, Claudius Gothicus and Tacitus. For nearly 300 years after Casaubon's edition, though much of the Historia Augusta was treated with some scepticism, it was used by historians as an authentic source – Edward Gibbon used it extensively in the first volume of the Decline and Fall of the Roman Empire. However, "in modern times most scholars read the work as a piece of deliberate mystification written much later than its purported date, however the fundamentalist view still has distinguished support. (...) The Historia Augusta is also, unfortunately, the principal Latin source for a century of Roman history. The historian must make use of it, but only with extreme circumspection and caution."

== Textual transmission ==
Existing manuscripts and witnesses of the Historia Augusta fall into three groups:

1. A manuscript of the first quarter of the ninth century, Vatican Pal. lat. 899 (Codex Palatinus), known as P, and its direct and indirect copies. P was written at Lorsch in Caroline minuscule. The text in this manuscript has several lacunae marked with dots indicating the missing letters, a confusion in the order of the biographies between Verus and Alexander, and the transposition of several passages: two long ones which correspond to a quire of the original which became loose and was then inserted in a wrong place, and a similar transposition in Carus. P is also distinguished by a succession of six centuries of editorial corrections, beginning with the original scribe, and includes such worthies as Petrarch and Poggio Bracciolini; none of these editors betray any knowledge of any other witness.
2. A group of 15th-century manuscripts, designated as Σ. Not only are the lives rearranged in chronological order, but the corruptions present in P have been subjected to drastic emendations or omitted altogether. Beginning with Ernst Hohl, some have asserted that the improvements in the text come from a source independent of P. Although admitting that "this question still remains to be answered definitively", author Peter Marshall noted that research undertaken through to the 1980s had improved scholarly knowledge concerning the methods and abilities of early Italian humanists, and concludes by saying that "the Σ manuscripts nowhere provide readings which are beyond the powers of the humanists active at the time.
3. Three different sets of excerpts, one of which Theodor Mommsen suggested was possibly the work of Sedulius Scottus. How any are related to P is unclear.

In Marshall's opinion, the best scholarly editions are those by H. Peter (Teubner, 2nd ed. 1884) and E. Hohl (Teubner, 1971, reissue of 1965 revised by Ch. Samberger & W. Seyfarth).

A copy of the Codex Palatinus (possibly the one made for Petrarch in 1356) was the basis of the editio princeps of the History, published in Milan in 1475. A subsequent printed version (the Aldine edition) was published at Venice in 1516, and this was followed closely by an edition edited by Desiderius Erasmus, and published by Johann Froben in Basel in 1518.

== Debates on dating ==
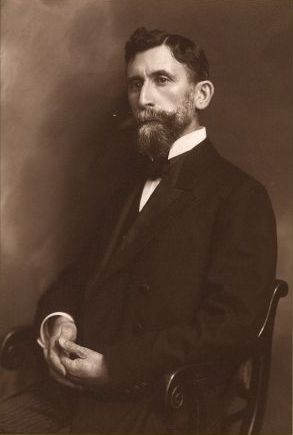
Hermann Dessau, whose groundbreaking work on the Historia Augusta led to its critical re-evaluation in the 20th century

In 1776, Gibbon observed that there was something wrong with the numbers and names of the imperial biographers, and that this had already been recognised by older historians who had written on that subject. (Note: Gerardus Vossius, who published de Historicis Latinis in 1627, discussed the problem of the distribution of the various vitae among the scriptores, but also the problems about the authors cited by them. Louis-Sébastien Le Nain de Tillemont, who published Histoire des Empereurs et des autres Princes qui ont régné durant les six premiers Siècles de l'Eglise in 1690, provided a wholesale denunciation of the biographies as being worthless, full of contradictions and chronological errors.) A clear example was the referencing of the biographer "Lampridius" (who was apparently writing his biographies after 324) by "Vopiscus", who was meant to be writing his biographies in 305–306. Then, in 1889, Hermann Dessau, who had become increasingly concerned by the large number of anachronistic terms, Vulgar Latin vocabulary, and especially the host of obviously false proper names in the work, proposed that the six authors were all fictitious personae, and that the work was in fact composed by a single author in the late 4th century, probably in the reign of Theodosius I. Among his supporting evidence was that the life of Septimius Severus appeared to have made use of a passage from the mid-4th-century historian Aurelius Victor, (Note: Sev. 17.5–19.4 was copied from Victor, Caes. 20.1 and 10–30; in both passages there is a major error, which mixes up the emperor Didius Julianus with the legal scholar Salvius Julianus) and that the life of Marcus Aurelius likewise uses material from Eutropius. (Note: MA 16.3–18.2 was lifted from Eutropius 8.11)

In the decades following Dessau, many scholars argued to preserve at least some of the six Scriptores as distinct persons and in favour of the first-hand authenticity for the content. As early as 1890, Theodor Mommsen postulated a Theodosian "editor" of the Scriptores' work, an idea that has resurfaced many times since. Hermann Peter, editor of the Historia Augusta and of the Historicorum Romanorum reliquiae, proposed a date of 330 for when the work was written, based upon an analysis of style and language. Others, such as Norman H. Baynes, abandoned the early-4th-century date but only advanced it as far as the reign of Julian the Apostate, useful for arguing the work was intended as pagan propaganda.

In the 1960s and 1970s, Dessau's original arguments received powerful restatement and expansion from Ronald Syme, who devoted three books to the subject and was prepared to date the writing of the work closely in the region of AD 395. Other recent studies also show much consistency of style, and most scholars now accept the theory of a single author of unknown identity, writing after 395. Although it was believed that the Historia Augusta did not reference any material from Ammianus Marcellinus' history, which was finished before 391 and which covered the same period, this has now been shown not to be the case, and that the Historia Augusta does in fact make reference to Ammianus' history.

Not all scholars have accepted the theory of a forger working around the last decades of the 4th century or the beginning of the 5th. Arnaldo Momigliano and A. H. M. Jones were the most prominent 20th-century critics of the Dessau-Syme theory amongst English-speaking scholars. Momigliano, summarizing the literature from Dessau down to 1954, defined the question as res iudicanda (i.e. 'a matter to be decided') and not as "res iudicata" ('a matter that has been decided'). Momigliano reviewed every book published on the topic by Ronald Syme, and provided counter-arguments to most if not all of Syme's arguments.

For instance, the reference in the Life of Probus about the emperor's descendants which has been taken to refer to Sextus Claudius Petronius Probus (consul in 371) and his family may, in the opinion of Momigliano, equally refer to the earlier members of the family, which was prominent throughout the 4th century, such as Petronius Probinus (consul in 341) and Petronius Probianus (consul in 322). Momigliano's opinion was that there was insufficient evidence to dismiss a composition date of the early 4th century, and that any post-Constantinian anachronisms could be explained by an editor working on the material at a later date, perhaps during the reigns of Constantius II or Julian.

Other opinions included H Stern's, who postulated that the History was composed by a team of writers during the reign of Constantius II after the defeat of Magnentius on behalf of the senatorial aristocracy who had supported the usurper. In the 21st century, Alan Cameron rebutted a number of Syme's and Barnes' arguments for a composition date c. 395–400, suggesting a composition date between 361 and the 380s.

== Authorship debate ==
Linked to the problem of dating the composition of the History is the question about the authorship of the work. Taking the History at face value, there is clearly a division between the authors named prior and after the presence of the interrupting lacuna. For the first half of the History, four scriptores are present, and the biographies are divided in a remarkably erratic fashion:

- Aelius Spartianus (7 lives): Hadrian, Aelius, Didius Julianus, Severus, Niger, Caracalla and Geta.
- Julius Capitolinus (9 lives): Antoninus, Marcus, Lucius Verus, Pertinax, Albinus, Macrinus, The Maximini, The Gordiani, and Maximus and Balbinus.
- Vulcacius Gallicanus (1 life): Avidius Cassius.
- Aelius Lampridius (4 lives): Commodus, Diadumenus, Heliogabalus and Severus Alexander.

Of these four, Spartianus and Gallicanus claim to be undertaking a complete set of imperial biographies from Julius Caesar onwards, while Lampridius' stated intention was to write a collection of biographies that would deal with the Gordians, Claudius II, Aurelian, Diocletian, Maximian and the four rivals of Constantine. Capitolinus also implied that he was writing more biographies than are present in the History.

The second half of the History is divided between two scriptores. Unlike the first half, the emperors tackled in this section are grouped logically, and are divided roughly in half between the two scriptores in chronological sequence:

- Trebellius Pollio (4 lives): Valerian, Gallienus, Tyranni Triginta and Claudius.
- Flavius Vopiscus Syracusanus (5 lives): Aurelian, Tacitus, Probus, Quadrigae Tyrannorum and Carus, Carinus and Numerian.

In terms of any acknowledgement of the mutual existence between the scriptores, only Flavius Vopiscus, ostensibly writing in 305 or 306, (Note: In the Aurelian, Vopiscus refers to Constantinus Chlorus as emperor and Diocletian as a private citizen, dating this composition between Diocletian's abdication on 1 May 305 and Constantius' death on 25 July 306) refers to any of the other authors, specifically Trebellius Pollio, Julius Capitolinus and Aelius Lampridius. None of the other five demonstrate any awareness of the existence of any of their 'colleagues'. However, these references cause difficulties when these authors also address Constantine in their dedications, as Vopiscus was also doing. For instance, Capitolinus mostly addresses Diocletian, but in the Albinus, Maximini and Gordiani he addresses Constantine in a fashion that suggests he is writing after 306.

The theory that there was a single author, as initially postulated by Hermann Dessau, is based on the difficulties inherent in having a single work comprising a number of individuals but without any textual evidence of an editor who brought the material together. This is especially evident in that the text has examples of stated intentions by an author to write a life of one of the emperors, only for that life to be completed by another of the scriptores. (Note: For example, Spartianus declares that he is going to write a life of Verus, but that life is attributed to Capitolinus.) If those statements are true, and those additional lives were completed, then an editor must have been involved in the project in order to select one scriptor's life over another's.

The presence of a post-Constantinian editor, as originally postulated by Theodor Mommsen, still has notable support, most recently articulated by Daniel Den Hengst, who suggests that the editor was the author of the second half of the History, operating under the pseudonyms of Pollio and Vopiscus. Further, that this editor not only wrote the secondary lives in the first half, but he was responsible for the insertions into the primary lives in that series. He takes the view that the vast stylistic differences between the two halves of the History means they cannot have been written by the same author.

If the validity of six independent authors is accepted, there are still issues, as the way they approached their work shows similar themes and details. All six not only provide biographies for the emperors, but also for the Caesars and usurpers. They describe their work and approach in very similar language, and quote otherwise unknown historians and biographers, such as Junius Cordus. They collectively share many errors, such as calling Diadumenianus "Diadumenus". They share much idiosyncratic content and similar language, with particular focus on women, wine and military discipline, and were fixated on poor-quality plays on words ascribing personality traits to certain emperors, for instance Verus was truthful, while Severus was a severe individual.

The authors shared certain stylistic characteristics that has been suggested would not naturally occur between individuals writing separately. For instance, the authors all happen to use the word occido with respect to killing, a total of 42 occurrences, but only once do any of them use the alternative word of interficio. This ratio is not found with any other writers in this time period and for this genre. Each of the six scriptores authored fictional lives for some of their biographies, all of them using fake sources, documents and acclamations.

It has been postulated that the names of the scriptores themselves are a form of literary playfulness, not only mocking both legitimate authors and historians, but the narrative itself. The names Trebellius Pollio and Flavius Vopiscus are sourced in various ways from Cicero's writings, as is the name Capitolinus. The word vopiscus is a rare Latin term, referring to a twin who survives, while its sibling died in utero. This has been interpreted to refer to "Flavius Vopiscus" as being the final one to survive from the six authors of the History. Vulcacius is believed to be a mockery of Volcatius Sedigitus, who was a historical literary critic with some association with humor. The meanings behind the other two scriptores, Spartianus and Lampridius, have eluded interpretation.

The results of recent computer-assisted stylistic analysis concerning the single vs multiple authorship have proven to be inconclusive:

"Computer-aided stylistic analysis of the work has, however, returned ambiguous results; some elements of style are quite uniform throughout the work, while others vary in a way that suggests multiple authorship. To what extent this is due to the fact that portions of the work are obviously compiled from multiple sources is unclear. Several computer analyses of the text have been done to determine whether there were multiple authors. Many of them conclude that there was but a single author, but disagree on methodology. However, several studies done by the same team concluded there were several authors, though they were not sure how many."

== Primary and secondary Vitae ==
A unique feature of the Historia Augusta is that it purports to supply the biographies not only of reigning Emperors, called "primary lives" by modern scholars, but also "secondary lives" of their designated heirs, junior colleagues, and usurpers who unsuccessfully claimed the supreme power. Thus among the biographies of 2nd-century and early 3rd-century figures are included Hadrian's heir Aelius Caesar, and the usurpers Avidius Cassius, Pescennius Niger and Clodius Albinus, Caracalla's brother Geta and Macrinus' son Diadumenian. None of these pieces contain much in the way of solid information: all are marked by rhetorical padding and obvious fiction. The biography of Marcus Aurelius' colleague Lucius Verus, which Mommsen thought 'secondary', is rich in apparently reliable information and has been vindicated by Syme as belonging to the 'primary' series.

The 'secondary' lives allowed the author to exercise freedom in the invention of events, places and people without the need to conform to authentic historical facts. As the work proceeds the author's inventiveness undergoes an increasing degree of elaboration as legitimate historical sources begin to run out, eventually composing largely fictional accounts such as the "biographies" of the "Thirty Tyrants", whom the author claimed had risen as usurpers under Gallienus. After the biography of Caracalla the 'primary' biographies, of the emperors themselves, begin to assume the rhetorical and fictive qualities previously confined to the 'secondary' ones, probably because the secondary lives were written after the Life of Caracalla.

The biography of Macrinus is notoriously unreliable, and after a partial reversion to reliability in the Life of Elagabalus, the Alexander Severus, one of the longest biographies in the entire work, develops into a kind of exemplary and rhetorical fable on the theme of the wise philosopher king. Clearly the author's previous sources had given out, but also his inventive talents were developing. He still makes use of some recognized sources – Herodian up to 238, and probably Dexippus in the later books, for the entire imperial period the Enmannsche Kaisergeschichte as well as Aurelius Victor, Eutropius, Ammianus Marcellinus and Jerome – but the biographies are increasingly tracts of invention in which occasional nuggets of fact are embedded.

Even where recognisable facts are present, their use in the History cannot be taken at face value. In the Life of Alexander Severus, the History makes the claim at 24.4 that Alexander had considered banning male prostitution but had decided against making it illegal, although the author added that the emperor Philip later banned the practice. Although the claim about Alexander is false, the note about Philip is true – the source of this is Aurelius Victor (28.6–7, and who sourced it from the Kaisergeschichte), and the History even copies Victor's style of moralising asides, which were not in the Kaisergeschichte. Normally, this anecdote would have been included in a Life of Philip, but its absence saw the author include it in another life. This is taken as evidence that the mid-work lacuna is deliberate, as the author was apparently reluctant to abandon any useful material that could be gleaned from the Kaisergeschichte.

Estimated amount of reliable historical details in some of the Historia Augusta's secondary and later primary vitae
Vita	Type of Vita	% estimate containing reliable historical details
Aelius	Secondary	25%
Avidius Cassius	Secondary	5%
Pescennius Niger	Secondary	29%
Clodius Albinus	Secondary	32%
Geta	Secondary	5%
Opellius Macrinus	Primary	33%
Diadumenianus	Secondary	5%
Elagabalus	Primary	24%
Alexander Severus	Primary	4%
Claudius	Primary	10%
Aurelian	Primary	27%
Tacitus	Primary	15%
Probus	Primary	17%
Firmus, Saturnius, Proculus, Bonosus	Secondary	0%
Carus	Primary	17%
Total		~17%

== Genre and purpose ==
Interpretations of the purpose of the History also vary considerably, some considering it a work of fiction or satire intended to entertain (perhaps in the vein of 1066 and All That), others viewing it as a pagan attack on Christianity, the writer having concealed his identity for personal safety. Under this anti-Christianity theory, the lacuna covering the period from Philip the Arab through to the end of Valerian's reign is seen as deliberate, as it freed the author from addressing Philip's reign, as by the late 4th century, Philip was being claimed as a Christian emperor, as well as not discussing Decius and Valerian's reigns, as they were well known persecutors of the Church. It avoided dealing with their fates, as Christians saw their ends as divine retribution for their persecutions.

Where mentioned, both Decius and Valerian are viewed very positively by the author of the History. It is noted that the History also parodies Christian scripture. For instance, in the Life of Alexander Severus there is: "It is said that on the day after his birth a star of the first magnitude was visible for the entire day at Arca Caesarea", while "where, save at Rome, is there an imperial power that rules an empire?" is considered to be a response to 2 Thessalonians 2:6–7.

Syme argued that it was a mistake to regard it as a historical work at all and that no clear propaganda purpose could be determined. He theorized that the History is primarily a literary product – an exercise in satire produced by a 'rogue scholiast' catering to, and making fun of or parodying, the antiquarian tendencies of the Theodosian age, in which Suetonius and Marius Maximus were fashionable reading and Ammianus Marcellinus was producing sober history in the manner of Tacitus. The History implausibly makes the Emperor Tacitus (275–276) a descendant and connoisseur of the historian.

In a passage on the Quadriga tyrannorum – the 'four-horse chariot of usurpers' said to have aspired to the purple in the reign of Probus – the History itself accuses Marius Maximus of being a producer of 'mythical history': homo omnium verbosissimus, qui et mythistoricis se voluminibis implicavit ('the most long-winded of men, who furthermore wrapped himself up in volumes of historical fiction'). The term mythistoricis occurs nowhere else in Latin. Of considerable significance in this regard is the opening section of the life of Aurelian, in which 'Flavius Vopiscus' records a supposed conversation he had with the City Prefect of Rome during the festival of Hilaria in which the Prefect urges him to write as he chooses and invent what he does not know.

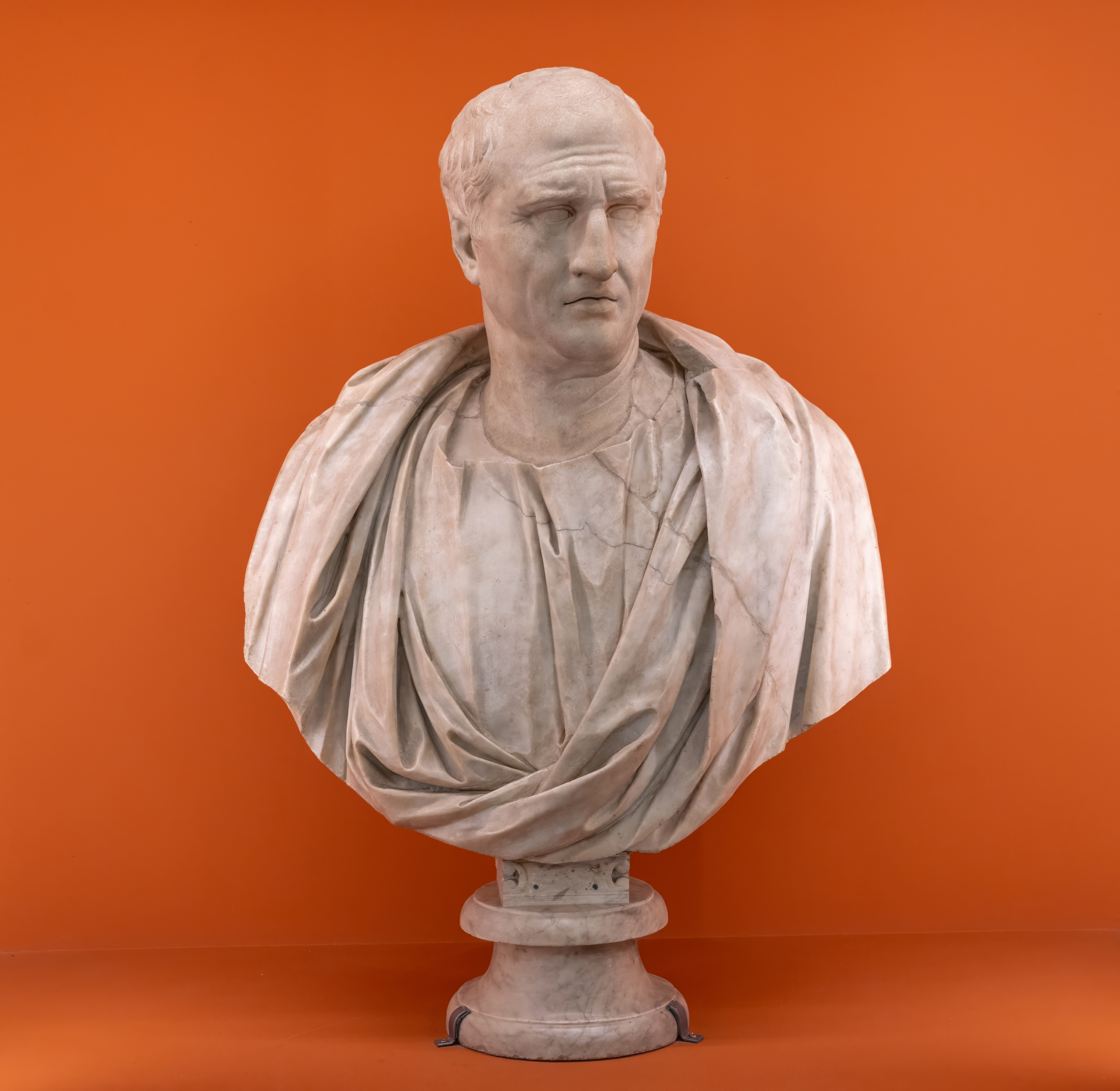
Cicero, one of the authors whose works the Historia Augusta references obliquely.

Other examples of the work as a parody can be taken from the names of the Scriptores themselves. It has been suggested that "Trebellius Pollio" and "Flavius Vopiscus Syracusius" were invented, with one theory arguing that their origins are based on passages in Cicero's letters and speeches in the 1st century BC. With respect to "Trebellius Pollio", this is a reference to Lucius Trebellius, a supporter of Mark Antony who was mentioned in the Philippics (Phil, 11.14), and another reference to him in Epistulae ad Familiares along with the term "Pollentiam" reminded the History's author of Asinius Pollio, who was a fellow plebeian tribune alongside Lucius Trebellius and a historian as well.

This is reinforced by noted similarities between the fictitious criticism of "Trebellius Pollio" by "Flavius Vopiscus" at the start of the Life of Aurelian, with similar comments made by Asinius Pollio about Julius Caesar's published Commentaries. Significantly, Lucius Trebellius adopted the cognomen Fides for his actions as Plebeian Tribune in 47 BC to resist laws that would abolish debts. Later when he fell into debt himself and began supporting debt abolishment, Cicero used his cognomen as a method of abuse and ridicule. According to this theory it is no coincidence that, in selecting the name "Trebellius Pollio", the author is playing with the concepts of fides and fidelitas historica at the precise point in the lives that are assigned to "Trebellius Pollio" and "Flavius Vopiscus Syracusius".

In the case of "Flavius Vopiscus Syracusius", it was argued that it too was inspired by the Philippics' reference to "Caesar Vopiscus" (Phil, 11.11), with Cicero's reference to Vopiscus immediately preceding his reference to Lucius Trebellius. The cognomen "Syracusius" was selected because Cicero's In Verrem is filled with references to "Syracusae" and "Syracusani". Further, in Cicero's De Oratore, Cicero refers to Strabo Vopiscus as an authority on humour, during which he refers to the reputation of Sicilians when it came to humour, and Syracuse was one of the principal cities of Sicily.

Such references were intended as a "knowing wink" to the readers of the History, who would recognise the mockery of the historical material by the author. This corresponds with David Rohrbacher's view of the History, who maintains that the author has no political or theological agenda; rather that the History is the equivalent of a literary puzzle or game, with the reader's understanding and enjoyment of the numerous elaborate and complicated allusions contained within it being the only purpose behind its existence.

In support of this theory, Rohrbacher provides an example with respect to Ammianus Marcellinus' work. In one passage (Amm. 19.12.14), Ammianus describes the Christian emperor Constantius II's attempts to prosecute cases of magic under treason laws, in particular the death penalty applied to those men who were condemned simply for wearing an amulet to ward off diseases: "si qui remedia quartanae vel doloris alterius collo gestaret" ("For if anyone wore on his neck an amulet against the quartan ague or any other complaint"). There is a very similar imperial ruling described in the Life of Caracalla (5.7), which makes no sense in Caracalla's time, and is worded in almost exactly the same way: "qui remedia quartanis tertianisque collo adnexas gestarent" ("wearing them around their necks as preventives of quartan or tertian fever").

Other theories include André Chastagnol's minimalist opinion that the author was a pagan who supported the Senate and the Roman aristocracy and scorned the lower classes and the barbarian races, while François Paschoud proposed that the last books of the History are in fact a type of alternative historical narrative, with events and the personalities of recent 4th century emperors woven into the fabric of a series of 3rd century emperors. According to Paschoud, the representation of the emperor Probus is in fact a version of Julian, with Carus substituting for Valentinian I and Carinus for Gratian.

== Historical value ==
From the late Renaissance to the end of the 19th century, historians had recognized that the Historia Augusta was a flawed and not a particularly reliable source, and since the 20th century modern scholars have tended to treat it with extreme caution. Older historians, such as Edward Gibbon, not fully aware of its problems with respect to the fictitious elements contained within it, generally treated the information preserved within it as authentic. For instance, in Gibbon's account of the reign of Gallienus, he uncritically reproduces the Historia Augusta's biased and largely fictional account of that reign. So when Gibbon states "The repeated intelligence of invasions, defeats, and rebellions, he received with a careless smile; and singling out, with affected contempt, some particular production of the lost province, he carelessly asked, whether Rome must be ruined, unless it was supplied with linen from Egypt, and arras cloth from Gaul", he is reworking the passage in The Two Gallieni:

I am ashamed to relate what Gallienus used often to say at this time, when such things were happening, as though jesting amid the ills of mankind. For when he was told of the revolt of Egypt, he is said to have exclaimed "What! We cannot do without Egyptian linen!" and when informed that Asia had been devastated both by the violence of nature and by the inroads of the Scythians, he said, "What! We cannot do without saltpetre!" and when Gaul was lost, he is reported to have laughed and remarked, "Can the commonwealth be safe without Atrebatic cloaks?" Thus, in short, with regard to all parts of the world, as he lost them, he would jest, as though seeming to have suffered the loss of some article of trifling service.

Gibbon then noted after this passage: "This singular character has, I believe, been fairly transmitted to us. The reign of his immediate successor was short and busy; and the historians who wrote before the elevation of the family of Constantine could not have the most remote interest to misrepresent the character of Gallienus." Modern scholars now believe that Gallienus' reputation was posthumously maligned, that he was one of the main architects of the later Roman imperial structure, and that his reforms were built upon by succeeding emperors.

Nevertheless, it is unwise to dismiss it altogether as it is also the principal Latin source regarding a century of Roman history. For example, scholars had assumed that Veturius Macrinus, mentioned in the Life of Didius Julianus, was an invention of the author, like so many other names. However, an inscription was uncovered which confirmed his existence and his post as praetorian prefect in 193. Likewise, the information that Hadrian's Wall was constructed during Hadrian's reign and that the Antonine Wall was built during the reign of Antoninus Pius are recorded by no other extant ancient writer apart from the Historia Augusta, (Note: Where other ancient writers (such as Eutropius) speak of a defensive wall in Britain, they have associated it with the activities of Septimius Severus.) the veracity of which on these points has been confirmed by inscriptions.

=== False documents and authorities ===
A peculiarity of the work is its inclusion of a large number of purportedly authentic documents such as extracts from Senate proceedings and letters written by imperial personages. In all it contains around 150 alleged documents, including 68 letters, 60 speeches and proposals to the people or the senate, and 20 senatorial decrees and acclamations. Records like these are quite distinct from the rhetorical speeches often inserted by ancient historians – it was accepted practice for the writer to invent these himself – and on the few occasions when historians, such as Sallust in his work on Catiline or Suetonius in his Twelve Caesars, include such documents, they have generally been regarded as genuine. Almost all those found in the Historia Augusta have been rejected as fabrications, partly on stylistic grounds, partly because they refer to military titles or points of administrative organisation which are otherwise unrecorded until long after the purported date, or for other suspicious content.

The History cites dozens of otherwise unrecorded historians, biographers, letter-writers, knowledgeable friends of the writers, and so on, most of whom must be regarded as expressions of the author's creative imagination. For example, the biographer "Cordus" is cited twenty-seven times in the History. Long considered to be a real, but lost, biographer until midway into the 20th century, with a couple of minor exceptions where material claimed to be sourced from Cordus is in reality from Suetonius or Cicero, every other citation is fake, providing details which have been invented and ascribed to Cordus. Cordus is mentioned almost exclusively in those Vitae where the History used Herodian as the primary source, and his appearances vanish once Herodian's history comes to an end.

The author also misattributes material taken from a legitimate historian and ascribe it to a fictitious author. For instance, Herodian is used more often than he is explicitly referenced in the History. In addition to the ten times he is correctly cited, three times his material is cited as "Arrianus", probably to multiply the author's sources. Not only does the author copy from Herodian without citation, either direct lifts, abbreviations or supplementations, he often distorts Herodian, to suit his literary objective.

Then there is the deliberate citation of false information which is then ascribed to legitimate authors. For instance, at a minimum, five of the History's sixteen citations of Dexippus are considered to be fake, and Dexippus appears to be mentioned, not as a principal source of information, but rather as a contradictory author to be contrasted against information sourced from Herodian or the Enmannsche Kaisergeschichte. In addition Quintus Gargilius Martialis, who produced works on horticulture and medicine, is cited twice as a biographer, which is considered to be another false attribution.

=== Examples of false historical events and personages ===
The untrustworthiness of the History stems from the multifarious kinds of fraudulent, as opposed to simply inaccurate, information that run through the work, becoming ever more dominant as it proceeds. The various biographies are ascribed to different invented 'authors', and continue with the dedicatory epistles to Diocletian and Constantine, the quotation of fabricated documents, the citation of non-historical authorities, the invention of persons, extending even to the subjects of some of the minor biographies, presentation of contradictory information to confuse an issue while making a show of objectivity, deliberately false statements, and the inclusion of material which can be shown to relate to events or personages of the late 4th century rather than the period supposedly being written about. For example:

- The biography of Geta states he was born in Mediolanum on 27 May. The year is not specified but it was 'in the suffect consulships of Severus and Vitellius'. He was actually born in Rome on 7 March 189. There was no such pair of suffect consuls in this or any other year. It has been suggested that the names for these persons be amended to be Severus and Vettulenus, and that these men were suffect consuls sometime before 192.
- In the Vita Commodi, the biography on emperor Commodus, there is much doubt about the authenticity of the sources used and cited. Lampridius, the pseudonym the author works with here, claims to have used Marius Maximus on multiple occasions for his work. One instance forms a case in point: Lampridius supposedly quotes the senatorial speeches in Maximus’ work which were held after Commodus’ death. It is unclear whether the references to Maximus are genuine or made up by the author to give himself a sense of authority and expertise. Baldwin thinks that the senatorial speeches are probably a figment of Lampridius’ imagination. Molinier-Arbo believes in their authenticity. She suggests that the full report of the acta senatus (lit. acts of the senate) was handed down in the acta urbis (a kind of city gazette). Marius Maximus could have used this report for his work and Lampridius could have used it later on.
- A letter of Hadrian written from Egypt to his brother-in-law Servianus is quoted at length, and was accepted as genuine by many authorities well into the 20th century. Servianus is saluted as consul, and Hadrian mentions his adopted son Lucius Aelius Caesar: but Hadrian was in Egypt in 130, Servianus' consulship fell in 134, and Hadrian adopted Aelius in 136. The letter is said to have been published by Hadrian's freedman Phlegon, with the letter's existence not mentioned anywhere except in the History, in another suspect passage. A passage in the letter dealing with the frivolousness of Egyptian religious beliefs refers to the Patriarch, head of the Jewish community in the Empire. This office only came into being after Hadrian put down the Jewish revolt of 132, and the passage is probably meant in mockery of the powerful late 4th-century Patriarch, Gamaliel.
- Decius revives the office of Censor; the Senate acclaims Valerian as worthy to hold it in a decree dated 27 October 251. The decree is brought to Decius, on campaign against the Goths, and he summons Valerian to bestow the honour. The revival of the censorship is fictitious, and Decius had been dead for several months by the date stated.
- Valerian holds an imperial council in Byzantium, attended by several named dignitaries, none of them otherwise attested and some holding offices not known to exist until the following century, at which the general 'Ulpius Crinitus', a name apparently chosen to evoke the military glories of the Emperor Trajan, takes the young Aurelian, destined to be another military Emperor, as his adopted son. There are no grounds to believe this is anything other than invention.

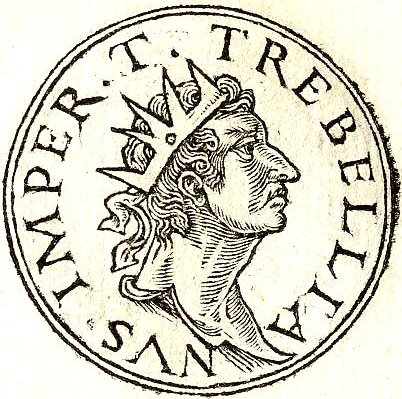
Trebellianus, one of the fictitious tyrants included in the Historia Augusta, drawn by Guillaume Rouillé's engraver in Promptuarii Iconum Insigniorum (1553)

- In the Tyranni Triginta, the author 'Trebellius Pollio' sets out to chronicle 'the 30 usurpers who arose in the years when the Empire was ruled by Gallienus and Valerian'. The number 30 is evidently modelled on the notorious 'Thirty Tyrants' who ruled Athens after the end of the Peloponnesian War. The chapter contains 32 mini-biographies. They include two women, six youths, and seven men who never claimed the imperial power, one usurper of the reign of Maximinus Thrax, one of the time of Decius, and two of the time of Aurelian, and a number who are not historical personages: Postumus the Younger, Saturninus, Trebellianus, Celsus, Titus, Censorinus, and Victorinus Junior.
- In the Life of Tacitus, the emperor is acclaimed by the Senate, meeting in the Curia Pompiliana, which never existed. The History then lists a number of individuals, all of whom are invented by the author: the consul 'Velius Cornificius Gordianus', 'Maecius Faltonius Nicomachus', the Prefect of the City 'Aelius Cesettianus', and the Praetorian Prefect 'Moesius Gallicanus'. Private letters commending Tacitus are quoted from the senators 'Autronius Tiberianus' and 'Claudius Sapilianus', both of whom are assumed to be non-historical personages. Most of the 'Maecii' and 'Gallicani' in the History are believed to be inventions of the author.
- In the Quadrigae Tyrannorum (Four tyrants: The Lives of Firmus, Saturninus, Proculus and Bonosus), the author includes Firmus, said to have been a usurper in Egypt under Aurelian. There is no certainty that this person ever existed. There was a Corrector named Claudius Firmus stationed in Egypt in 274, about the time Zosimus states that Aurelian was dealing with some trouble in that province. Nevertheless, the History's wealth of detail about him is considered to be completely invented. For example, he would eat an ostrich a day, he had a carriage drawn by ostriches, he would swim among crocodiles, he built himself a house fitted with square panels of glass.
- In the Life of Probus, the author 'Flavius Vopiscus of Syracuse' states that the Emperor's descendants (posteri) fled from Rome and settled near Verona. There a statue of Probus was struck by lightning, a portent according to soothsayers 'that future generations of the family would rise to such distinction in the senate they all would hold the highest posts', though Vopiscus, supposedly writing under Constantine, says this prophecy has not yet come to pass. This is one of the strongest indications of the History's late 4th-century date, as it seems to be a fairly transparent allusion to the rich and powerful senator Sextus Claudius Petronius Probus (consul in 371) whose two sons held the consulship together in 395. Petronius Probus was born in Verona.

== Marius Maximus or 'Ignotus'? ==
Certain scholars have always defended the value of specific parts of the work. Anthony Birley, for instance, has argued that the lives up to Septimius Severus are based on the now-lost biographies of Marius Maximus, which were written as a sequel to Suetonius' Lives of the Twelve Caesars. As a result, his translation of the History for Penguin Books covers only the first half, and was published as Lives of the Later Caesars, Birley himself supplying biographies of Nerva and Trajan (these are not part of the original texts, which begin with Hadrian).

His view (part of a tradition that goes back to J. J. Müller, who advanced Marius' claims as early as 1870, and supported by modern scholars such as André Chastagnol) was vigorously contested by Ronald Syme, who theorized that virtually all the identifiable citations from Marius Maximus are essentially frivolous interpolations into the main narrative source, which he postulated was a different Latin author whom he styled 'Ignotus ("the unknown one"), the good biographer'.

His theory argued, firstly, that as Marius wrote a sequel to the Lives of the Twelve Caesars, his work covered the reigns from Nerva to Elagabalus; consequently, this would not have included a biography of Lucius Verus, even though the biography of that Princeps in the History is mainly of good quality. Secondly, that 'Ignotus' only went up to Caracalla, as is revealed by the inferior and mostly fictitious biography of Macrinus.

Finally, that the composer of the Historia Augusta wrote the lives of the emperors through to the Life of Caracalla, including Lucius Verus, using Ignotus as his main source, and supplementing with Marius Maximus on occasion. It was only when the source failed that he turned to other less reliable sources (such as Herodian and Maximus), as well as his own fertile imagination, and it was at this juncture that he composed the first five minor lives, through to the Life of Geta.

A similar theory to Syme's has been put forward by François Paschoud, who claimed that Maximus was probably a satirical poet, in the same vein as Juvenal and not an imperial biographer at all. His argument rests on the point that, outside of the mentions in the History, the only extant referencing of Marius' work is always in the context of Juvenal, and that the History's description of him as a historian cannot be taken at face value, given how it invents or distorts so many other citations. This theory is rejected by historians such as Anthony Birley and David Rohrbacher.

== Literary value ==
The Historia Augusta has been described by Ronald Syme as "the most enigmatic work that Antiquity has transmitted". Although much of the focus of study throughout the centuries has been on the historical content, since the 20th century there has also been an assessment of the literary value of the work. For much of that time the assessment has been critical, as demonstrated by the analysis put forward by David Magie:

The literary, as well as the historical, value of the Historia Augusta has suffered greatly as a result of the method of its composition. In the arrangement in categories of the historical material, the authors did but follow the accepted principles of the art of biography as practised in antiquity, but their narratives, consisting often of mere excerpts arranged without regard to connexion or transition, lack grace and even cohesion. The over-emphasis of personal details and the introduction of anecdotal material destroy the proportion of many sections, and the insertion of forged documents interrupts the course of the narrative, without adding anything of historical value or even of general interest. Finally, the later addition of lengthy passages and brief notes, frequently in paragraphs with the general content of which they have no connexion, has put the crowning touch to the awkwardness and incoherence of the whole, with the result that the oft-repeated charge seems almost justified, that these biographies are little more than literary monstrosities.

M. L. W. Laistner was of the opinion that "even if the Historia Augusta was propaganda disguised as biography, it is still a wretched piece of literature", while Ronald Syme noted that with respect to the author's Latin prose:

He was not an elegant exponent. His normal language is flat and monotonous. But uneven, and significantly so. For this author is erudite, a fancier of words, and a collector. Hence many rarities, or even inventions ... first, when depicting the measures of a military disciplinarian, he brings in technical terms redolent of the camp. Second, archaism, preciosity, and flowery words.

Further, the work shows evidence of its having been put together in a very haphazard and hasty fashion, with little to no subsequent editing of the material to form a cohesive narrative. Birley sees an example of the carelessness with which the author approached the work in the construction of Marcus Aurelius' biography, where midway through the Life of Marcus Aurelius the author found himself in a muddle, probably because he had historical material in excess of what he required, and because he had already used up much of his source to write separate biographies of Lucius Verus and Avidius Cassius, whose lives intersected with Marcus'.

The answer he came up with was to use Eutropius as his source for a brief overview of Marcus' principate following the death of Lucius Verus. However, he found that in doing so, the narrative's ending was too abrupt and so, after including some gossip about Commodus not being his son, he once again began an account of Marcus' reign after the death of Verus.

Although these criticisms still form the prevailing view on the History's literary worth, modern scholars such as Rohrbacher have begun to argue that, while it is poorly written and not a stylistic or polished work, its use of allusion as a vehicle for parodying popular late 4th century biographical and historiographical works means that the very features which were once a cause for intense criticism (such as the inclusion of irrelevant or contradictory inventions alongside traditionally sourced material) are actually an intentional and integral part of the work, making it one of the most unusual pieces of literature to emerge from the ancient world.

== See also ==
- Enmannsche Kaisergeschichte

== Sources ==
- Anonymous (c. 395). Historia Augusta [Augustan History] (in Latin).
- Baldwin, Barry (1984). Studies on Late Roman and Byzantine History, Literature, and Language. Volume 12 of London studies in classical philology. Brill Academic Publishing. ISBN 978-90-70265-56-4.
- Baldwin, Barry (1981). "Acclamations in the Historia Augusta". Athenaeum. 59. Italy: Pavia: 138–149.
- Barnes, Timothy (1978). The Sources of the Historia Augusta. Latomus. ISBN 978-2-87031-005-2.
- Baynes, Norman Hepburn (1926). The Historia Augusta. Its Date and Purpose. Oxford: U.M.I.
- Birley, Anthony (2013). Hadrian: The Restless Emperor. Roman imperial biographies. Routledge. ISBN 978-1-135-95226-6.
- Birley, Anthony (1988). Lives of the Later Caesars. United Kingdom: Penguin. ISBN 978-0-14-193599-7.
- Birley, Anthony (2006). "Rewriting second- and third-century history in late antique Rome: the Historia Augusta". Classica. 19 n.1. Brazil: Belo Horizonte.
- Birley, Anthony (1967). "The Augustan History". Latin Biography.
- Birley, Anthony (1966). "Two Names in the Historia Augusta". Historia: Zeitschrift für Alte Geschichte. 15 (2). Germany: Franz Steiner Verlag: 249–253. JSTOR 4434928.
- Bray, John Jefferson (1997). Gallienus: A Study in Reformist and Sexual Politics. Wakefield Press. ISBN 978-1-86254-337-9.
- Breisach, Ernst (2007). Historiography: Ancient, Medieval, and Modern, 3rd ed. Chicago: University of Chicago Press. ISBN 978-0-226-07284-5.
- Browning, Robert (1983). "Biography". In Kenney, E. J.; Clausen, Wendell Vernon; Cameron, Averil (eds.). The Cambridge History of Classical Literature: Volume 2, Latin Literature, Part 5, The Later Principate. Vol. 2. Cambridge University Press. pp. 41–50. ISBN 978-0-521-27371-8.
- Bunson, Matthew (1991). A Dictionary of the Roman Empire. Oxford: Oxford University Press.
- Cameron, Alan (2010). The Last Pagans of Rome. Oxford: Oxford University Press. ISBN 978-0-19-978091-4.
- Campbell, Brian (1994). The Roman Army, 31 BC-AD 337: A Sourcebook. Routledge. ISBN 978-1-134-90940-7.
- Cancik, Hubert; Schneider, Helmuth; Salazar, Christine (2009). Brill's New Pauly: Encyclopaedia of the Ancient World. Antiquity. Vol. 14. Holland: Brill. ISBN 978-90-04-14219-0.
- Den Boeft, Jan; Drijvers, Jan Willem; Den Hengst, Daniël; Teitler, Hans (2013). Philological and Historical Commentary on Ammianus Marcellinus XXIX. Brill. ISBN 978-90-04-26787-9.
- Den Hengst, Daniel (2010). Emperors and Historiography. Brill. ISBN 978-90-04-17438-2.
- Gibbon, Edward (1776). Decline and Fall of the Roman Empire, Vol I.
- Habelt, Rudolf (1968). Bonner Historia-Augusta-Colloquium, Volume 4. Rudolf Habelt Verlag.
- Hadas, Moses (2013). A History of Latin Literature. Columbia University Press. ISBN 978-0-231-51487-3.
- Hornblower, Simon; Spawforth, Antony; Eidinow, Esther (2012). The Oxford Classical Dictionary. Oxford: Oxford University Press. ISBN 978-0-19-954556-8.
- Jones, Arnold Hugh Martin (1986). The Later Roman Empire 284–602, Vol 2. Oxford: Taylor & Francis. ISBN 978-0-8018-3354-0.
- Jones, Arnold Hugh Martin; Martindale, John Robert; Morris, John (1971). The Prosopography of the Later Roman Empire, Vol. I (A.D. 260–395). Cambridge University Press. ISBN 978-0-521-07233-5.
- Kreucher, G (2003). Der Kaiser Marcus Aurelius Probus und seine Zeit. Wiesbaden, Germany: Franz Steiner Verlag. ISBN 978-3-515-08382-9.
- Laistner, M. W. L. (1966). The Greater Roman Historians. University of California Press.
- Magie, David (1921). The Historia Augusta. London & Harvard: Loeb Classical Library.
- Maude, William (1900). William Maude, De Die Natale (the Natal Day) by Censorinus, Life of the Emperor Hadrian by Aelianus Spartianus. New York: Cambridge Encyclopedia Co.
- Marshall, Peter K (1983). "Scriptores Historiae Augustae". In Reynolds, Leighton Durham (ed.). Texts and Transmission: A Survey of the Latin Classics. Clarendon Press. pp. 354ff. ISBN 978-0-19-814456-4.
- Mehl, Andreas (2011). Roman Historiography. London: John Wiley & Sons. ISBN 978-1-4051-2183-5.
- Mellor, Ronald (2002). The Roman Historians. Routledge. ISBN 978-1-134-81652-1.
- Molinier-Arbo, Agnès (2010). "Les documents d'archives dans la Vita Commodi : degré zéro de l'histoire ou fiction". Dialogues d'Histoire Ancienne. suppl. 4.1. France: Persée: 87–112. doi:10.3406/dha.2010.3344.
- Momigliano, Arnaldo (1954). "An Unsolved Problem of Historical Forgery: The Scriptores Historiae Augustae". Journal of the Warburg and Courtauld Institutes. 17 (1/2). Oxford: 22–46. doi:10.2307/750131. JSTOR 750131. S2CID 195057185.
- Momigliano, Arnaldo (1969). "Review: Ammianus and the Historia Augusta by Ronald Syme". The English Historical Review. 84 (332): 566–569. doi:10.1093/ehr/LXXXIV.CCCXXXII.566. JSTOR 562486.
- Momigliano, Arnaldo (1973). "Review: Emperors and Biography. Studies in the Historia Augusta by Ronald Syme". The English Historical Review. 88 (346): 114–115. doi:10.1093/ehr/LXXXVIII.CCCXLVI.114. JSTOR 562570.
- Momigliano, Arnaldo (1984). Secondo Contributo Alla Storia Degli Studi Classici. Ed. di Storia e Letteratura.
- Claudian (1922). Claudian on LacusCurtius. Translated by Platnauer, Maurice. Harvard: Harvard University Press.
- Potter, David (2005). Literary Texts and the Roman Historian. Routledge. ISBN 978-1-134-96233-4.
- Prickman, Greg (2013). "Ninth Century – The Text" in The Atlas of Early Printing. Archived from the original on 2014-08-10 – via University Archives at the University of Iowa Libraries.Mirror at
- Raschke, Manfred (1976). "New Studies in Roman Commerce with the East". Politische Geschichte (Provinzen und Randvölker: Mesopotamien, Armenien, Iran, Südarabien, Rom und der Ferne Osten). 9. W. de Gruyter. ISBN 978-3-11-007175-7.
- Rohrbacher, David (2016). The Play of Allusion in the Historia Augusta. Wisconsin: University of Wisconsin Press. ISBN 978-0-299-30604-5.
- Rohrbacher, David (2013). "The Sources of the Historia Augusta Re-examined" (PDF). Histos. 7.
- Shorter, David (2008). Roman Britain: A Sourcebook.
- Syme, Ronald (1968). Ammianus and the Historia Augusta. United Kingdom: Clarendon Press. ISBN 978-0-19-814344-4.
- Syme, Ronald (1971). Emperors and Biography: studies in the 'Historia Augusta'. United Kingdom: Clarendon Press. ISBN 978-0198143574.
- Syme, Ronald (1983). Historia Augusta Papers. United Kingdom: Clarendon Press. ISBN 978-0-19-814853-1.
