= Lucius Aurelius Marcianus =

3rd century Roman general

Vir Perfectissimus Lucius Aurelius Marcianus
- Born: Illyricum(?)
- Military career
- Allegiance: Roman Empire
- Rank: Tribunus Cohortis Praetoriani, Dux Exercitus
- Conflicts: Achaea, Illyricum, Asia
- Other work: Praeses Dalmatiae(?)

Lucius Aurelius Marcianus was a Roman soldier whose military career coincided with the period of crisis that characterized the middle decades of the Third Century AD – see Crisis of the Third Century. Probably of humble origins in one of the Illyrician provinces of the Empire (Note: In the Third Century AD the term Illyricum was being used to define the Danubian provinces of the Empire, the area covered seemingly corresponding to the region of south east Europe commonly referred to as the Balkans while its inhabitants were known as Illyriciani – see Mocsy(1974:200-01).) he was one of the group of men from this region who chose a military career – or had it chosen for them – whose professional capabilities brought them to the fore of public life in those troubled times. Marcianus rose to the highest levels of the military hierarchy. The evidence suggests that he earned the trust of the Emperors Gallienus and Claudius II and, possibly, Marcus Aurelius Probus among their successors and that he was one of the principal commanders in the prolonged war against a coalition of what the late antique Greek writers called Scythian peoples whose incursions in that period seemed to threaten the very survival of the Roman state. These would refer to the major Germanic and Iranian peoples, among them the Goths and Roxolani, who invaded the Roman empire across the lower Danube River.

Nothing is known of his private life.

== The sources ==
=== Literary ===
==== Ancient ====
The notoriously inaccurate Scriptores Historiae Augustae (SHA) make several references to Marcianus's military exploits in two of the Imperial uitae, i.e. the Duo Gallieni (the Two Gallieni) and the Diui Claudii (the Deified Claudius), albeit solely in relation to his role in dealing with barbarian incursions into the Imperial provinces of the region now described as South Eastern Europe in 267–8 AD. They also assert that he was deeply involved in the conspiracy of senior officers that led to the assassination of Gallienus in 268 AD and his replacement by Claudius II – i.e. Claudius Gothicus.

The only other ancient literary source in which Marcianus is securely attested is the Νέα Ιστορία ("New History") of the Greek historian, Zosimus. Zosimus's "Marcianus" is generally agreed to be the same man as that referred to in the SHA, but he is mentioned only once in the "New History" and then in a purely military context. However, Zosimus's failure to make any mention of him in relating the events of the army marshals' coup against Gallienus is considered very significant by some modern commentators.

It was at one time believed that Marcianus was to be identified with the Marianus who was one of three leaders mentioned in a recently discovered fragment of Dexippus as coordinating Greek resistance to a Gothic invasion that swept across the Balkans in the early 260s. However recent scholarship has established Marianus as a previously unknown governor of Achaia

==== Secondary ====
The only modern biography specifically devoted to Marcianus is that of Gerov which was written in 1965. Gerov wrote before recent archaeological and numismatic discoveries encouraged the development of a new view of Imperial activity in Asia during the reign of Claudius II and Marcianus's possible involvement in this. Thus his biography did not consider the possibility that Marcianus commanded an expedition to counter Scythian incursions into Asia region at this time, for which the only literary reference was an off-hand statement in Zosimus. In addition, he was not able to take account of the very critical examination of the SHA material that took place from the late-1960s onwards, especially by Sir Ronald Syme, which might have affected his willingness to accept the account of Marcianus's activity propagated by that work. Although Gerov's paper is still considered the standard study of Marcianus, it is now possible to come to significantly different conclusions on some points.

=== Epigraphic ===
==== Reference to Marcianus authoritatively established ====
There are three epigraphic inscriptions that have been identified by published authorities as relating to the Marcianus of the ancient literary sources – albeit with varying degrees of confidence. These add considerably to the knowledge of his career derived from the literary sources:

1. From Philippopolis, Thracia (ancient city located in modern Plovdiv, Bulgaria): This inscription (in Greek) comes from a monument set up by the Town-Council and People of Philippopolis honouring one "Marcianus" (i.e. no praenomen or nomen) who saved the city when it was besieged by an unidentified enemy. The identification with the Marcianus of the literary sources (see above) was first made by Gerov;

2. From Termessos, Lycia et Pamphylia province, (ancient city located on Mount Dagi ( Taurus Mountains)), Antalya province, Turkey): This inscription (in Greek) is from a monument set up by the Town-Council and People of Termessos dedicated to one "L. Aurelius Marcianus", a "patron and benefactor" of the city who "brought peace". It is now proposed that this dates from the reign of Claudius II and that the dedicatee can be identified with the Marcianus of the Philippopolis Inscription. The Termessos inscription provides the only secure reference to Marcianus's praenomen (i.e. Lucius); however, his nomen is also confirmed in a third inscription

3. Discovered in Rhodes, but originally from Kibyra, Pamphylia (ancient city in south-west Turkey, near the town of Gölhisar, in Burdur Province: This inscription (in Greek) was on a monument honouring one "Aurelius Marcianus", who is celebrated as "a most generous military leader". This inscription, like that from Termessos, is now thought to date from the reign of Claudius II and to honour the same man.)

All three of these inscriptions give the dedicatee the title of διασημότατον (i.e. diasemotaton – nominative form diasemotatos), which is the Greek equivalent of the Latin honorific Vir Perfectissimus. Thus, when the monuments with which they were associated were set up, he was a member of the Second Class of the Roman equestrian order. The viri perfectissimi were invariably men of very high official and social status with close connections to the Imperial Court.

Similarly on each of them he is described as a δούξ (doux)- the Greek transliteration of the Latin Dux which was at this time still in the process of developing from a functional title to an established rank in the military hierarchy. (Note: In the case of the Philippolis Inscription Marcianus was a δούξ καί στρατηλάτης i.e. doux kai stratelates – lit "Leader and Marshal"). For a discussion of the possible significance of this description see below.) All known duces were Viri Perfectissimi. This suggests that, in addition to military capability, men who were entrusted with this function had to be known personally to and trusted by the reigning Emperor.

The status of a vir perfectissimus et dux was an exalted one in the hierarchy of the Imperial Service of the late 260s. (The governor of Lycia et Pamphylia probably ranked no higher than egregius ("Select"), the Third Grade of the Equestrian Order). That all three dedicatees mentioned in these inscriptions not only bore the same cognomen (and in the Asian instances, the same gentilicium), but were also of this rank strengthens the proposition that they were, in fact, the same man who was also the Marcianus referred to by the SHA and Zosimus.

If this identification is accepted, the detail of the inscriptions fills out the information relating to Marcianus's service in the war in Achaea and Illyricum under Gallienus that can be derived from the literary record. It also argues for the proposition that he subsequently saw active service against Scythians raiders in Asia for which there is no literary record.

In that latter connection, a recent study of a fourth inscription from the ancient city of Sagalassos (Lycia et Pamphylia – modern Antalya province, Turkey) seems to throw further light on his career. The Sagalassos document does not mention Marcianus specifically, but it does indicate that the operations against the Scythian pirates in the Eastern Mediterranean under Claudius II mentioned by Zosimus involved a significant land operation under Claudius II in Pisidian Asia. This encouraged a review of the then current interpretations of the Marcianus inscriptions

==== ... not established ====
A further inscription (in Latin) discovered near Salona, Dalmatia, (now Split, Croatia) honouring the Emperor Marcus Aurelius Probus was dedicated by an "Aurelius Marcianus", a Vir Perfectissimus, described as Praeses, i.e. equestrian governor, of the province of Dalmatia. The invocation of Probus as the reigning Emperor fixes this document to the period 276–82 AD which means that the dedicator was at least a contemporary of the Marcianus of the literary record. The possibility that he was that Marcianus is not inherently unlikely, but the identification has yet to be securely established.

== Origins ==
There is no information from the ancient sources relating to Marcianus's date or place of birth but he is generally assumed to have had his origin in one of the Danubian provinces – i.e. Illyricum. His nomen/gentilicium, (i.e. "Aurelius"), would usually be taken to indicate that his family was admitted to Roman citizenship as a result of the Emperor Caracalla's Constitutio Antoniniana of 212 AD. This would mean that he was certainly not a member of the aristocracy that had ruled the Empire under the Severan Dynasty, but owed his prominence to his own capabilities.

== Rise to eminence ==
Information for Marcianus's career in the years before he was entrusted with senior commands is almost non-existent. The only literary reference is from Zosimus who, recording Marcianus's appointment as theatre-commander in the war against Scythian invaders of Illyricum in 268 AD – see below – remarked that he was:

... a man of great experience in military affairs.

This indicates that his early career had been mainly as a soldier. It is most likely that Marcianus enlisted as a common soldier which would suggest that he had to serve many years before achieving commissioned rank. On this period of his life, apart from Zosimus's aside – see above – the sources are entirely silent. (Note: Despite this, Gerov (1965:340-1) concludes from the balance of probabilities that he is more likely to have enlisted as ranker like his near-contemporary Traianus Mucianus than to have profited from prior equestrian status to be directly commissioned as a centurion like Lucius Petronius Taurus Volusianus. Volusianus's appointment as Praetorian Prefect almost certainly coincided with Marcianus's time as a Guards tribunus – see below. This view of Marcianus's early career has not been queried in Academe.)

The Philippopolis Inscription (epigraphic source 1. above) records that before he began to receive Imperial commissions as a dux Marcianus had been the tribunus of a Praetorian Cohort and a Protector of Gallienus. (See Protectores Augusti Nostri). This indicates that, whatever his beginnings, he had not only survived involvement in the almost incessant warfare that was the condition of a soldier serving in the Illyrician garrisons in the middle decades of the Third Century, but also that he thereby distinguished himself and that by the mid-260s he had achieved equestrian status and had been singled out for promotion to the most senior commands.

Praetorian tribuni were chosen from among officers who were members of the Equestrian Order by the Emperor himself, usually on the recommendation of the Praetorian Prefect or other persons of influence in Court Circles. His status as a protector was almost certainly acquired during Gallienus's sole reign (260–8 AD) when these appointments were made from among senior Praetorian officers or legionary prefects (see, again, Volusianus and also Publius Aelius Aelianus) for by the end of Gallienus's reign and certainly under Claudius II these men were being appointed from the centurions of all units attached to the Imperial field-army – see Traianus Mucianus. Progression to more senior commands by way of a tour of duty in the units of the Roman garrison (sometimes with successive postings to the Vigiles, the Cohortes Urbanae and the Praetorian Guard) and admission to the ranks of the Protectores Augusti Nostri was a career-path followed by a number of Marcianus's eminent near-contemporaries. (Note: Again see Volusianus and Traianus Mucianus and, possibly also, Diocletian and Constantius Chlorus.)

== Career as a field-officer ==
The praetorian tribunate mentioned on the Philippopolis Inscription is the only known reference to Marcianus as a member of the regular military hierarchy in command of a specific unit of the army as traditionally organised – albeit with no hint as to which of the ten cohorts of the Guard he commanded. (Note: It is possible that the cohort that Marcianus commanded was not named in the Philippopolis inscription by error or because the name was a detail of no interest to those who commissioned the monument on which the epigraph appeared. However, it is equally possible that the tribunate was not a substantive command, but a rank given to Marcianus when he was actually employed in Gallienus's military entourage in some other capacity. In other words, the appointment could have been an administrative ploy resorted to merely to enable Marcianus to be advanced up the army-list while his actual duties about the court were of an administrative, ceremonial or advisory nature. See WP Article Traianus Mucianus for possible examples of such nominal appointments being given to an officer probably employed in the comitatus.) Otherwise he is always described as a dux. In this capacity he would have commanded composite forces consisting of detachments (vexillationes) of regular units put together to deal with particular emergencies that the local provincial garrisons were unable to deal with. In exercising such commands he would have been answerable to the Emperor directly.

His recorded military exploits in this capacity all relate to campaigns undertaken against incursions of barbarian war-bands from the region to the north of the Black Sea known to the Romans as Scythia in the period 267–69 AD. The details of this war are obscure. The narrative used here to put the scrappy references of the SHA and Zosimus into some sort of historical context is that described in the Battle of Naissus and by Biagi.

=== In Europe ===
==== Actions in Achaea ====
Marcianus's first recorded military exploit was a victory he won over Scythian invaders in the province of Achaea. (Note: The SHA names the barbarians concerned as "Goths". Other fourth-fifth century sources suggest that "Heruli" constituted a major element of the pirate fleet that invaded Achaea. The use of these names to identify the groups that threatened the Roman World in the Third Century is probably anachronistic: contemporary Romans probably knew them generically as "Scythians" ("Skythae" in Greek). (See Potter(2004:244)).) It is now accepted that this action related to the Scythian incursions that took place in 267 AD.

The enemy were part of a sea-born force that had arrived in Grecian waters after an eventful voyage across the Black Sea and into the Aegean and the Eastern Mediterranean. At first things had gone well for them and they had sacked Athens and then ravaged the Peloponnese as far south as Sparta. However, a Roman naval force seems to have destroyed many of their ships and, as they retired northwards overland, a force of Athenian militia under Dexippus inflicted a defeat on them near that city.

Their encounter with Marcianus's army was their first with regular Roman troops and, although he too managed to defeat them, the engagement was inconclusive. The barbarians seem to have retired in good order, withdrawing northward as a coherent force. However, somewhere in Illyricum they were intercepted by the Imperial field-army under Gallienus which won a substantial victory in the valley of the River Nestos (which marked the border between the provinciae of Macedonia and Thracia) persuading the war-leader of the "Heruli", Naulobatus, to make peace with the Emperor. This action probably took place before the end of the year 267 AD. It is not known if Marcianus was present, but Gerov considered that he retained his independent command after Gallienus took charge of the war in Illyricum. (As noted above, the relief of Philippopolis probably took place in the autumn of that year).

==== ... and Illyricum, 267–8 AD... ====
Marcianus is next recorded:

... making war on all the Scythians with varying success...which measures roused all the Scythians to rebellion.

This reference is rather opaque, but, it is interpreted to mean that after the Imperial victory over Naulobatus's war-band on the Nestos, Marcianus was given the task of clearing Illyricum of other Scythian invaders who seem to have been inspired by the initial success of the "Goths" and "Heruli" in Achaea and the eastern Mediterranean to swarm into the Balkans.

Gerov suggests that after the action by the Nestos the Romans were essentially engaged in "mopping up" operations against an enemy already defeated. However, as indicated, the language of the SHA gives the impression that the fighting was difficult and inconclusive and served only to stir up more barbarian attacks.

The Uita Diui Claudii appears to suggest that the future Emperor Claudius and Marcianus served as joint-commanders in this campaign. Furthermore, it is inferred that, whereas "Gothic" bands

escaped Marcianus after he had chastised them...

Claudius fared rather better in the SHA account

... hoping to prevent what actually came to pass [i.e. the necessity for a major campaign against Scythian invaders] (he) had not allowed [them] to break forth.

It is possible that Claudius did indeed serve alongside Marcianus although, if he did so, it was probably as Marcianus's subordinate/lieutenant. There is really no means of deciding who was the most effective commander in the field. However, recent historians have cast doubt on the notion that Claudius took any part at all in this campaign.

It may be significant that the Philippopolis Inscription honours Marcianus as the man who raised the siege, an action which seems to have taken place at this time, and makes no reference to Claudius.

==== ... as theatre-commander in Illyricum ====
Probably shortly after the Battle of the Nestos Gallienus found it necessary to abandon his operations in Illyricum and hurry back to Italy to crush Aureolus who had risen in revolt and seized Mediolanium (Milan). According to Zosimus, he left Marcianus to carry on the war against the Scythians. This appointment is not referred to by the SHA or any other ancient source now extant, but seems to be generally accepted by modern historians.

The title accorded Marcianus on the Philippopolis Inscription, doux kai strateletes, is interpreted by Gerov to mean that, whereas he had been a dux while Gallienus was in command in Illyricum, he was promoted above that rank when the Emperor left him in charge of the war against the Scythians after his own departure to fight Aureolus. This term is the Greek equivalent of the Latin Dux Ducum - i.e. Leader of Leaders (Commander-in-Chief). Gerov cites the instance of the Palmyran general Zabdas who was mentioned in one inscription as the strateletes of the army of Zenobia. This title - in the Latin form - was also bestowed on Aurelius Marcellinus in the epigraph on the gate of Verona (CIL, 3329 (ILS, 544) (Verona)).

Gerov further argues that as strateletes Marcianus's command had a territorial significance in that he was made a Praeses, probably of the two Moesias, provinces which lay athwart the main invasion-route for barbarian incursions from the Black Sea. Christol argues that it might indicate a wider responsibility for the Balkan provinces as a whole as indicated by Zozozimus - see above.

Gerov's interpretation of the title's significance is not accepted by the PLRE which considers that the term indicated no more than that Marcianus was a dux as this was currently understood. It argues that the addition of kai stratelates to the word doux had no other purpose than to "assist interpretation". (Note: Exactly what the PLRE meant by this is not clear. However, it seems to suggest that, in order to help a Greek-speaking audience understand the use of the Latin dux, in describing Marcianus's military function it gave an alternative Greek term that would have been more familiar to them).)

However, the phrase is interpreted, it seems likely that Town-Council and Citizens of Philippopolis intended it to be known that Marcianus was in supreme command of the force that had saved their city at its moment of greatest peril and that his only superior was Gallienus:

... Our August and Unvanquished Lord...

This would accord with the meaning of the term doux on Inscriptions 2 and 3 – see above.

Zosimus makes no reference to the nature of the war fought by Marcianus in his new capacity. As already indicated, Gerov suggests that, by the time Gallienus left for Italy, all that remained for his successor in Illyricum was to deal with scattered bands of barbarians who knew that they were beaten. However, as also indicated. the SHA can be interpreted to mean that Marcianus had to deal with new incursions of peoples encouraged by the earlier successes of the "Goths" and "Heruli". The presently preferred narrative of this war arguing for a second wave of incursions whose ultimate defeat was only achieved by a supreme effort of the Imperial field-army under the Emperor Claudius in bloody confrontations at the Battle of Naissus and in the central Balkans mountains seems to indicate that Marcianus as Gallienus's theatre-commander had had to fight a difficult campaign where successes were accompanied by reversals.

=== Role in the conspiracy against Gallienus ===
Marcianus is next recorded at Mediolanium where Aureolus was under siege by Gallienus's Imperial field-army. According to Gerov, Aureolus's stubbornly prolonged defence of the city after his defeat in the field had finally obliged Gallienus to summon Marcianus from Illyricum where that officer commanded the only other substantial force currently at his disposal.

According to the SHA in Italy he joined with Aurelius Heraclianus, Gallienus's Praetorian Prefect, in a plot to overthrow the Emperor. By this account the two generals could

... no longer endure the iniquities of Gallienus...

and they accordingly decided that he had to be killed and that one or the other of them should become Emperor in his place.

The SHA then goes on to suggest that Marcianus was instrumental in contriving the circumstances of Gallienus's death and, when that was accomplished, that it was he who pacified the army rank-and-file which had been enraged by the murder by arranging for the distribution of a substantial donative to each man from the treasury. However, whatever the intentions of the principals in the affair, in the event it was Claudius who was chosen to succeed the murdered Gallienus. Claudius had had nothing to do with the conspiracy, but, in the end, everybody agreed that he was

[...]the best man of all....

The SHA assertion that Marcianus was a principal conspirator is not confirmed by Zosimus – or by any other ancient source. According to the account in the "New History" it was Claudius who was Heraclianus's co-conspirator. Not only does Zosimus make no mention of Marcianus as being involved in the putsch he fails even to place him at Mediolanium when these dramatic events were unfolding. Modern historians are divided on the issue of which of Gallienus's senior officers was complicit in his murder and subsequent replacement by Claudius and, specifically, on the involvement of Marcianus. Gerov considers that he was indeed one of the principals in the conspiracy. Certainly, he is inclined to accept the account of the SHA as exculpating Claudius who he suggests was the posthumous victim of Zosimus's pagan antipathy to his memory as the proclaimed ancestor of Constantine the Great, the first Christian Emperor. Watson too believes that his fellow-marshals knew that they could rely on the support of Marcianus whether or not he was actually present at Mediolanium.

Other historians take the contrary view that Zosimus's account was broadly correct and that the SHA's attempt to involve Marcianus was an exercise in misdirection. They argue that that author of that work intended to refute any suggestion that Claudius might have been involved in a treasonable conspiracy against a legitimate Emperor, even one so contemptible as Gallienus, because he was, in fact, guilty of just that. They point out that this was a matter of present concern when the SHA were writing because Claudius was the proclaimed ancestor of the ruling Constantinian Dynasty. (Note: The intention of the author of the SHA seems fairly explicit when he reminds his readers that Claudius was the ancestor of the then ruling Emperor, Constantius – i.e.Constantius II, "... our most watchful Caesar..."(SHA(DG14.3).) For these historians the very suggestion that Marcianus was actually present at Mediolanium is suspect given the silence of Zosimus and the grave state of affairs he would have had to leave behind him in Illyricum.

Potter takes no position in this controversy which is, of course, ultimately, incapable of resolution. Nevertheless, his general observation on the matter is highly apposite:

[...] while the sources are less than clear about the precise chain of events, they are explicit on a single issue: that most of Gallienus's senior officials wanted him dead.

If Marcianus shared the initial view of the army rank and file and dissented from this sentiment there is no reason to suppose that he attempted to thwart the conspiracy or ever contemplated taking vengeance on those involved.

=== A campaign in Asia ===
The ancient sources give no indication as to the role of Marcianus in the great war against the "Goths" and related barbarian peoples that culminated in the Roman victories at the Battle of Naissus and, afterwards, in the Balkan mountains – Haemus Mons. However, the inscriptions from Termessoss and Kibyra (epigraphic sources 2 and 3 above) suggest that he was associated with a campaign to clear the Eastern Mediterranean of "Gothic" pirates who had been ravaging the islands and the southern Anatolian coast since their original incursion from the Black Sea in 267 AD. Recent archeological and numismatic discoveries in this region (in particular the Sagalassos Inscription – see above – now seem to indicate that Imperial forces were active in this region in the reign of Claudius II.

"Gothic" raids into the province of Pamphylia (modern Antalya) not only threatened communications between the European and the eastern provinces, but also put in danger the flow of corn and other produce from the Pisidian plateau at a time when Palmyrene activities in Egypt had made these all the more vital to Roman forces seeking to operate in the region. It is likely that the general disturbance caused by the Gothic pirates was also unsettling the peoples of Isauria in the central regions of Asia who the Romans had up to then been content to leave to their own devices.

Under the High Empire responsibility for local policing and regional defence in the Asian provinces had been entrusted to the militias of the autonomous Greek cities of the region and there were no significant Imperial forces in this region. The central Asian provinces were defined as inermis (lit. "unarmed") insofar that it had never seemed necessary to station permanent garrisons of imperial troops. (Note: Essentially the term inermis denoted a province without a legionary garrison. However, this did not exclude the possibility of there being local militias. In addition, detachments from the armed provinces (vexillationes were often sent into the provinciae inermes to carry out police duties.) However, it would seem that by the latter part of Claudius's reign this arrangement was no longer adequate and increased intervention by the central government became necessary. Control of Termessos and Kibyra together with that of Sagalassos, a third city where evidence of activity at the time of Claudius II is particularly noted by Biagi, would have been key to the maintenance of Rome's strategic interests in the region. A landward thrust into this area would also have complemented the naval campaign undertaken, apparently at that time, by Tenagino Probus, the governor of Aegyptus

Marcianus is likely to have arrived in the region accompanied by European troops and to have cooperated with the local police-forces. The inscriptions would suggest that he may have achieved his immediate objectives. (Zosimus asserts that the Gothic pirates:

... did not achieve much...

although, he gives Tenagino Probus, the commander of the naval operations, credit for this outcome). There is no evidence to suggest that Marcianus was still in the region when Zenobia of Palmyra launched her attempt to take control of the Asian provinces.

== Final years ==
=== Praeses Dalmatiae? ===
A number of factors make it tempting to identify the Marcianus of the literary record with "Aurelius Marcianus", the Vir Perfectissimus mentioned on the Salona Inscription as Praeses of Dalmatia under the Emperor Probus:

- Their chronological proximity;
- The coincidence of the names: "Marcianus" was not an uncommon cognomen, but
- The very high rank (i.e. dux) and social status (i.e. vir perfectissimus) attributed to both these persons increases the likelihood that they were one and the same; and
- The example of Publius Aelius Aelianus who was appointed Praeses of Mauretania Caesariensis by Probus some ten years after he was recorded as the equestrian commander of Leg. II Adiutrix in the mid-260s AD indicates that that prince would appoint seasoned military men to govern provinces where their professional expertise was likely to be required. Like Aelianus, the literary Marcianus certainly fulfils that criterion. Marcianus had had direct experience of campaigning in the mountains of Illyricum and would seem to have been well-suited to the task of governing a province as "difficult" as Dalmatia.

Nevertheless, there has never been a secure identification of Marcianus with the Salona dedicatee made by an authoritative source so this possibility must presently be discounted for WP purposes.

=== Later career and death ===
There is no information whatsoever as to the final stages of Marcianus's career or to the date and circumstances of his death.

=== Heirs ===
Marcianus left no known heirs.

== Works cited ==
=== Primary ===
- The Augustan History: Life of Gallienus Vitae Duo Gallieni (SHA DG); Life of the Deified Claudius Vita Divi Claudii (SHA VC) )
- Zosimus: New History Book 1 (Zos)

=== Secondary ===
- Alfoldi, A. (1965). Cambridge Ancient History Vol. XII: Chap. V, Invasions of peoples from the Rhine to the Black Sea. Cambridge: Cambridge University Press. pp. 138–164.(Alfoldi(1965))
- L'Année Épigraphique (AE)
- Biagi, Solange. (2006). "La fidélité d'une cité grecque, φίλη καὶ σύμμαχοι Ῥωμαίων: un miliaire de Sagalassos et les raids barbares sur la Pamphylie sous le règne de Claude II". La Crise de l'Empire Romaine: (Ed) Marie-Henriette Quet. Paris: PUPS. (Biagi(2006));
- Bray, J (1995). Gallienus: A study in reformist and sexual politics. Kent Town, South Australia: Wakefield Press.(Bray(1995));
- Bury, J.B. (1898). The History of the Roman Empire from its Foundation to the death of Marcus Aurelius (27 BC-180 AD). Cambridge University Press. (Bury(1898)):
- Mallan, C.; Davenport, C (2015). "Dexippus and the Gothic Invasions: Interpreting the New Vienna Fragment (Codex Vindobonensis Hist. gr. 73, ff 192-193)". Journal of Roman Studies. 105: 203–226. doi:10.1017/s0075435815000970. S2CID 163234044. (Mallan and Davenport (2015);
- Corpus Inscriptionum Latinarum (CIL)
- Christol, M. (1977). "La carrière de Traianus Mucianus et l'origine des protectores". Chiron. 7: 393–408.(Christol(1977))
- Christol, M. (1978). "Un duc dans une inscription de Termessos (Pisidie)". Chiron. 8: 529–40.(Christol(1978))
- Dobson, B. (1974). The significance of the Centurion and the 'Primipilaris' in the Roman Army and Administration. Aufstieg und Niedergang der römischen Welt II. Vol. 1. pp. 392–434.(Dobson(1974))
- Forgiarini, T. (1998). "À propos Claude II: les invasions gothiques et le role de l'empereur". In Frézouls, E.; Jouffroy, H. (eds.). Les empereurs illyriens. Strasbourg. pp. 81–86. (Forgiarini(1998))
- Jones, A.H.M.; Martindale, J.R.; Morris, J., eds. (1971–1992). The prosopography of the later Roman Empire (PLRE) (3 vols). Cambridge: Cambridge University Press. (PLRE (1971–92))
- Gerov, B. (1965). "La carriera militare di Marciano, generale di Gallieno". Athenaeum. 43: 333–354. (Gerov (1965)).
- Mennen, Inge (2011). Power and Status in the Roman Empire, AD 193–284. Leiden and Boston: Brill.(Mennen (2011)
- Nagy, Prof. T. (1965). "Commanders of Legions in the age of Gallienus". Acta Archeologica Hungarica. XVII: 290–307.(Nagy(1965)
- Potter, Prof. D.S. (2004). The Roman Empire at bay, AD183-395. London: Routledge.(Potter (2004))
- Saunders, R.T. (1991). A biography of the emperor Aurelian (A.D 270-75):Ph.D dissertation for University of Cincinnati. Ann Arbor, Michigan: UMI Dissertation Services. (Saunders(1991))
- Smith, R.E. (1979). Smallwood, Mary E. (ed.). "Dux, Praepositus". Zeitschrift für Papyrologie und Epigraphik. 36: 263–278. JSTOR 20185810.(Smith(1979))
- Southern, P. & Dixon, K.R. (2000). The Later Roman Army. London: Routledge.(Southern&Dixon(2000)
- Watson, Alaric (1999). Aurelian and the Third Century. London and New York: Routledge. (Watson(1999))

== Other external links ==
- Lucius Aurelius Marcianus on the Last Statues of Antiquity (LSA) Database at Oxford University
