= Traianus Mucianus =

3rd century Roman general

Traianus Mucianus was a Roman soldier of Thracian origins of the second half of the Third Century AD who rose from the lowest ranks of the army to senior commands. He was almost certainly a remarkable soldier. However, the successive promotions he secured in the latter part of his career are thought to owe much also to the favour shown him by men highly placed in the Imperial entourage whose patronage secured him advantageous postings in the Imperial comitatus, the mobile field force under the direct command of the Emperor, that was undergoing massive expansion at this time.

It seems likely that Mucianus's recorded career was passed entirely in military service. However, information relating to his later life is so fragmentary that it is not possible to be certain of this. The evidence can be construed as to read that, after achieving equestrian status (see Roman equestrian order), he was from time to time given gubernatorial postings in his home-province of Thracia and elsewhere.

== Ancient sources ==
=== The Mucianus Inscription ===
There are no surviving references to Mucianus in contemporary literary sources in either the Latin or the Greek traditions. The only evidence for the details of his career – or, indeed, for his very existence – consists of a single epigraphic inscription in Greek on a monument set up in his honour discovered on the site of Augusta Traiana. (Note: The Mucianus Monument is preserved in the Sophia Museum - Cat. 3578.) This document is dated to the years 268-85 AD, perhaps towards the end of that period

The inscription is badly damaged while the surviving text has many lacunae whose possible reconstruction is sometimes disputed by commentators. Furthermore, some sections of the text, particularly in the latter part, are so badly damaged as to make their reconstruction largely speculative

Nevertheless, accepting these drawbacks, the Mucianus Inscription is considered by some to give an unusually complete record of the career of a senior officer at a time when the Roman Army was undergoing profound organisational changes. His elevation to the centurionate, and his rise through that body to equestrian status and, hence, the higher levels of command, is thought to be particularly informative of the experiences of officers fortunate enough to have made their careers in the expanded Imperial field army. However, other scholars query how much light the evidence of the inscription actually sheds on the structure of officers' careers in general terms as opposed to the specific instance of Mucianus.

=== The Aurelianic Inscriptions ===
The interpretation of the Mucianus Inscription is assisted by evidence of two other inscribed monuments honouring two high-ranking officers of Thracian origin thought to be brothers, (Marcus) Aurelius Heraclianus and (Marcus) Aurelius Apollinarius. Both of these memorials, like that to Mucianus himself, were discovered at the site of Augusta Traiana.

It is generally accepted that Traianus Mucianus was the dedicator of both the Aurelianic monuments and that he set them up to express his gratitude to the brothers for the influence they had exercised - presumably with the Emperor (Gallienus) - to the benefit of his career. The particular benefit referred to is discussed below - see item 5.

== Origins ==
Mucianus's date of birth is not known. Like his presumed patrons, the Brothers Aurelii (see above) he was probably born in Augusta Traiana. Nothing is known of his family or their social circumstances.

== Career ==
The text of the Mucianus Inscription - so far as it survives – lists the appointments he held and, often, the rank at which he held them. The Greek gives the equivalents in that language of the Latin terms that would have been used by the Roman Army. These last are listed below insofar as they can be read or deduced from the inscription.

=== ... In the ranks ... ===
1. MILES, COH. I CONCORD... - i.e. served as an infantryman in a cohort of auxiliary infantry, Cohors I Concord...; (Note: Coh. I Concord... might refer either to a Cohors I Concord(ensium) or Cohors I Concord(ia Severiana), both of which were Severan creations)

2. LEGIONARIUS, LEGIO II PARTHICA - served as a legionary (infantryman) in Legio II Parthica:

3. EQUES, COH. VII PRAETORIAE - served as a cavalryman in Cohors VII, Praetorian Guard;

4. EVOCATUS - had served out his time in Coh. VII of the Praetorians and had made a sufficiently favourable impression to be then invited to re-enlist (Note: See Evocati Augusti).

=== ... in the centurionate ... ===
5. CENTURIO, LEGIO XIII GEMINA, PROTECTOR - promotion to the rank of Centurion in Legio XIII Gemina, with the additional title of Protector (Augusti Nostri) (i.e. designating him a member of Gallienus's newly created Imperial Bodyguard) (Note: Mucianus's appointment as a centurio protector is attributed to the influence of Aurelius Heraclianus who became Praetorian Prefect in 267 AD - see above. His membership of the Protectores Augusti Nostri indicates that Leg. XIII Gemina (or the detachment of that legion to which he was posted) was attached to the field army commanded directly by the Emperor, i.e. the comitatus. It is likely that the posting was served during Gallienus's campaigns in the Balkans against the barbarian Heruli and then in Italy against the rebel general Aureolus.)

6. CENTURIO PROTECTOR VIGILUM; CENTURIO PROTECTOR URBANICIANUS, CENTURIO PROTECTOR COH. V PRAETORII - indicates three successive postings as a Centurio Protector, in: (i) the Vigiles; (ii) the Urbaniciani (i.e. the Cohortes Urbanae); and (iii) Coh. V, Praetorian Guard; (Note: Mucianus's postings in the Vigiles and the Urbaniciani are thought to have been notional only (hence the absence of a cohort designation in these cases) being intended to fulfill the procedural requirements for his substantive third appointment to the Praetorian centurionate in a designated cohort.)

7. PRINCEPS PROTECT(ORUM) - appointment as the Principal Officer of the Centuriones Protectores; (Note: This office is otherwise unknown. It may have been equivalent in rank to a legionary Primus Pilus.)

=== ... Equestrian appointments ... ===
From this point on the listing of Mucianus's postings is based on reconstructions of the damaged inscription text which are often disputed;

8. PRIMIPILARIUS, PROTECTOR/E PROTECTORE(?) - becomes a Primipilarius. (Note: The term primipilarius designates an equestrian rank which was achieved by an army officer who had previously held office as a primus pilus and had served a year in that capacity. The rank had no substantive military or civil function.) During this time Mucianus was either still a member of the protectores or e protectore (i.e. 'formerly a Protector')

9. PRAEFECTUS (CASTRORUM?), LEGIO IIII FLAVIA - appointment as Praefectus Castrorum(?) (Note: The inscription text reads only Praefectus which might indicate that the appointment was as equestrian commander of Leg. IIII (i.e. Praefectus Legionis Agens Vice Legati - see item 14). However, the reading Praefectus Castrorum is generally preferred as this was the next substantive military appointment for an officer of primipilarius rank) in Legio IIII Flavia Felix;

10. DUX/PRAEFECTUS CASTRORUM(?), LEGIO IIII FLAVIA ET LEGIO VII CLAUDIA - he was appointed either Commander (Dux) (Note: The term Dux at this time denoted the commander of a composite force made up of more than one legion or vexillationes (i.e. detachments) drawn from more than one legion) with an ad hoc mandate not necessarily restricted to a specific province. Such an officer probably ranked above a legionary commander whose commission would usually be restricted to a single province Mucianus had yet to achieve a legionary command.) or Camp Prefect of a composite force comprising Legio IIII Flavia Felix and Legio VII Claudia or detachments of these legions;

11. TRIBUNUS(?) LIBURNARIORUM - appointment as a Commander, Fleet Marines, with a rank equivalent to that of a cohort tribune in the Vigiles, the Urbaniciani or the Praetorians; (Note: It is conjectured that this was, again, a notional appointment, this time in one the Praetorian fleets based at Misenum or Ravenna contrived t o give Mucianus the seniority he needed for his next substantive appointment)

12. Commands involving PEDITES ET EQUITES MAUROS ET OSROENOS and EXPLORATORES - the text is massively corrupted, but may have indicated that Mucianus served with a mixed infantry/cavalry formation attached to the Imperial entourage with scouting responsibilities (Note: A formation recruited from the Mauri and Osroeni peoples (see Mauritania and Osroene) may have been attached to the Imperial Household at this time) The term Exploratores usually denoted 'spies' or 'scouts';

13. DUCENARIUS, PRAEFECTUS … - Mucianus was in Mesopotamia for this posting almost certainly after the reimposition of Roman authority in that province following Aurelian's suppression of Zenobia of Palmyra. The text describing his rank/function is irredeemably corrupt, but one authority suggests that the use of the terms Ducenarius and Praefectus may indicate that he was the Prefect of Mesopotamia (Note: As in the case of Egypt, the governor of the Roman province of Mesopotamia was an equestrian with the title of "praefectus".) with the rank of Ducenarius (Note: See Roman equestrian order for discussion of the term Ducenarius) However, other commentators either evade the issue. or imply that Mucianus was exercising a purely military function – perhaps commanding an (unidentified) legion as a Praefectus Legionis agens vices legati (Note: The title/rank Praefectus Legionis Agens Vice Legati is discussed in the article on Publius Aelius Aelianus)

14. PRAEFECTUS (AGENS VICE LEGATI)(?), LEGIO XIII GEMINA - Equestrian commander of Leg. XIII Gemina. Mesopotamia has been suggested as the location. A date as late as 280 AD has been suggested;

15. DUX(?), EQUITES MAURI ET OSROENI - posting as a Commander (Dux) (Note: The rank is uncertain, but must have been at least equivalent to that Mucianus held as the commander of Leg. XIII - see item 14.) of a composite force of Moorish and Osroene Cavalry;

16. PRAEFECTUS (AGENS VICE LEGATI?), LEGIO II TRAIANA - Equestrian commander of Legio II Traiana Fortis. It is conjectured that Mucianus exercised this command in Egypt;

17. DUX(?), LEGIO IIII FLAVIA ET LEGIO II ... - posting as the commander of a composite force comprising Legio IiII Flavia and one of the legions enumerated II or substantial detachments of these formations (Note: The identity of the second legion is uncertain. Legio II Adiutrix has been tentatively suggested)Where Mucianus exercised this command is unknown. However, it is possible that the legion was engaged in one of the wars with Persia undertaken at this time - again see Legio IIII Flavia Felix. Alternatively, this command could have been exercised in Thracia - see below;

18. Posting in Thracia, possibly as governor (Note: While the surviving text does seem to indicate that he was in Thracia that he was there as governor is a conjectural reconstruction. However, most recent commentators doubt that the inscription gives any support to the notion that Mucianus ever exercised a non-military office.))

== Finale ==
The surviving inscription ends at this point and there is no further information relating to Mucianus's career. However, it is assumed that he was in Thracia when his memorial was erected. It is possible that he was then governor of the province, but a military command as a Dux is also possible. The inscription can be read either way, but the weight of modern commentary favours Dux

It was at one time thought that Mucianus might be identified with the Aurelius Mucianus, who was Praeses (i.e. governor of equestrian rank) (Note: After the Diocletianic administrative reforms the old formula used to indicate a praeses was of equestrian status – i.e. agens vice praesidis (AVP) – became otiose. All praesides were by then equestrians.) of the province of Raetia (coincides roughly with Switzerland) under Diocletian. Recent commentators have either specifically rejected this notion or ignored it.
