= Dexippus (spider) =

Scientific classification
- Kingdom: Animalia
- Phylum: Arthropoda
- Subphylum: Chelicerata
- Class: Arachnida
- Order: Araneae
- Infraorder: Araneomorphae
- Family: Salticidae
- Subfamily: Salticinae
- Genus: Dexippus; Thorell, 1891

Type species
- D. kleini Thorell, 1891

Species
- See text.

Genus of spiders

Dexippus is a genus of Asian jumping spiders (family Salticidae) that was first described by Tamerlan Thorell in 1891. The genus name is derived from Publius Herennius Dexippus, an ancient Greek historian. As of June 2019, it contains four species, found only in Asia:

- Dexippus kleini Thorell, 1891 – India, Sumatra
- Dexippus pengi Wang & Li, 2020 – India, China
- Dexippus taiwanensis Peng & Li, 2002 – Taiwan
- Dexippus topali Prószyński, 1992 – India
