= Naulobatus =

3rd century Herulian chief

Naulobatus was the name - or, perhaps, the title - of a chieftain of the various peoples who took part in the major seaborne incursion into the eastern Mediterranean of 267-8 AD now referred to as the Herulian Invasion. He is the only such leader for whom there is any record. "Naulobatus" is the Latinised form by which he was known to the Romans some centuries after his death. His actual name is unknown as is his ethnic origin. However, the Heruli seem to have been a Germanic group as opposed to the Iranian Sarmatae and Alani with whom they mingled in their homelands to the north of the Black Sea. They are sometimes associated with their Goth neighbours. (Note: No position is taken here on the heated WP controversy on the Heruli - quis videt)

== Historical significance ==
Naulobatus's historical significance lies in the fact that the piratical enterprise with which he was associated was ultimately unsuccessful. (See the Battle of Naissus for a summary of recent scholarship on this conflict and also Lucius Aurelius Marcianus). The defeat of the force of which he was obviously a prominent leader if not the supreme commander was the first major success secured by the Romans in their efforts to ward off such assaults by peoples who they knew generically as Scythians - "Skythae" in the Greek-speaking eastern provinces. The combination of measures of pro-active defence by which this was secured eventually enabled the Empire to regain the initiative vis-à-vis the barbarians beyond its northern frontier which, by and large, it was to retain for over one hundred years after Naulobatus's death.

However, the treatment accorded Naulobatus after he submitted is also significant. Syncellus states that he was granted Ornamenta Consularia, i.e. the status of an ex-Consul and the right to wear the distinctive regalia of that class of Roman senator on ceremonial occasions, a high honour usually reserved for allied kings in the east. It is assumed that, as a quid pro quo Naulobatus would have made some of his light-armed tribesmen available for service in the Roman Army. This indicates the readiness of the Romans to use diplomacy in addition to military might as a means of thwarting their enemies. In this instance the ploy failed. Whatever Naulobatus thought he was doing or intended when he made his peace with Gallienus, his people obviously did not consider that his personal agreement with the Roman Emperor should survive Gallienus's murder by his officers: the Heruli are soon recorded as making further assaults on the Empire both in the Balkans and Asia Minor - again see Lucius Aurelius Marcianus).

== Sources ==
The single literary reference to Naulobatus in the surviving primary sources appears in the Chronographia of George Syncellus. Syncellus prepared this work early in the Ninth Century AD, but seems to have had access to ancient works no longer extant, including, presumably, those of Dexippus. The anonymous Continuator Dionis mentions one "Andonnoballus" who is described as a Herulian refugee at the camp of Marcus Aurelius Claudius, Gallienus's murderer and successor as emperor. Bray suggests that this Andonnoballus is Naulobatus under an alternative name as he considers it unlikely that there were two prominent Heruls in the Imperial Entourage in the years 267-8 AD. This attribution is not accepted by others in Academe. However, the references are interesting in that they give us some insight into the contemporary Roman view of the barbarian as a cunning and impudent savage.

== Works cited ==
=== Primary ===
- Anonymous Continuator Dionis (1885). Muller (ed.). Fragmenta Historicorum Graecorum, Vol 1. Paris.(FHG(1));
- Syncellus, Georgius (1829). Dindorf (ed.). Chronographia. Bonn. (Syncellus);

=== Secondary ===
- Blois, Lukas De (1976). The policy of the Emperor Gallienus. Leyden, NL: Brill.;
- Bray, John (1995). Gallienus: A study in reformist and sexual politics. Kent Town, South Australia: Wakefield Press.
