= Publius Aelius Martialis =

Roman soldier of the mid-3rd century

Martialis (P. Aelius) was a Roman soldier of the mid-3rd century. He is known to us from a lapidary inscription on his sarcophagus dating from the early 260s found at Aquincum (i.e. Budapest) in the Roman province of Pannonia Inferior. This was dedicated to Martialis and his wife, Flavia Agathe, by his son, Publius Aelius Aelianus, and it designates him as the ex custode armorum (i.e. 'formerly in charge of the weapons') of Legio II Adiutrix. Custodes Armorum were principales, I.e. non-commissioned officers who earned one and one half times the pay of legionaries and, of course, enjoyed immunity from chores, fatigues etc. to which legionary greges (lit 'the common herd') were subject

The nomen Aelius suggests that Martialis's family became Roman citizens in the first part of the 2nd century and, possibly when the future emperor Hadrian was governor of the province of Pannonia and established Aquincum as a municipium — i.e., a town-settlement of citizens awarded the Latin Right — around 106 AD. The original Aelius is, therefore, likely to have been a soldier in a unit of auxilia who received the citizenship together with his diplomata (i.e. certificate of honourable discharge from the service). His descendants no doubt continued the connection with the local legion, II Adjutrix. (Martialis's son, Publius Aelius Aelianus, became the first equestrian commander of that unit in the early 260s following the exclusion of senators from military commands).
