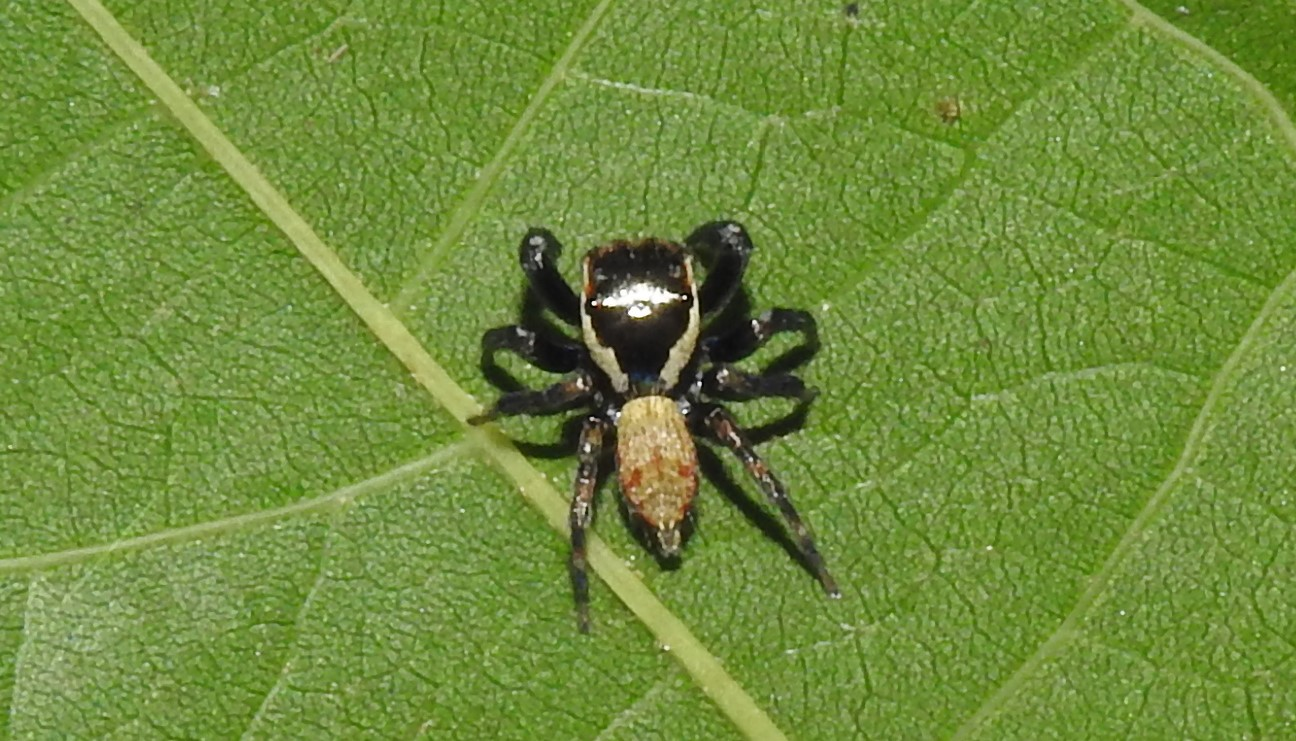

Scientific classification
- Kingdom: Animalia
- Phylum: Arthropoda
- Subphylum: Chelicerata
- Class: Arachnida
- Order: Araneae
- Infraorder: Araneomorphae
- Family: Salticidae
- Genus: Dexippus
- Species: D. pengi

Binomial name
- Dexippus pengi Wang & Li, 2020

= Dexippus pengi =

Species of spider

Dexippus pengi is a species of jumping spider found in China and India.
