= Dexippus taiwanensis =

Scientific classification
- Kingdom: Animalia
- Phylum: Arthropoda
- Subphylum: Chelicerata
- Class: Arachnida
- Order: Araneae
- Infraorder: Araneomorphae
- Family: Salticidae
- Genus: Dexippus
- Species: D. taiwanensis

Binomial name
- Dexippus taiwanensis Peng & Li, 2002

Species of spider

Dexippus taiwanensis is a jumping spider, similar in appearance to D. kleini. It is endemic to Taiwan, which provides its specific epithet "taiwanensis".
