= Protectores Augusti Nostri =

Protector Augusti Nostri (lit 'Protector of Our Augustus') was a title given to individual officers of the Roman army as a mark of their devotion to and approval by the Emperor himself. The term first appears with this meaning in the joint-reign of Valerian and Gallienus. Lucius Petronius Taurus Volusianus was the first recorded Protector appointed by Gallienus.

== Imperial Guards of Gallienus ==
The use of the title protector in the sense of a 'bodyguard of a Great Man' long preceded the appointment of Volusianus. In addition, the title was not only bestowed by Emperors. However, it does seem to be the case that Gallienus was the originator of the Protectores Augusti Nostri.

It seems that, when it was first bestowed, it was a title of honour and not a functional one carrying authority. It seems to have been granted to officers who had distinguished themselves serving directly under Gallienus in his wars against barbarian invaders of the Balkan and German provinces and Italy and would-be usurpers in those regions such as Ingenuus. The officers who were granted the title were therefore effectively marked out for accelerated promotion under his patronage. It would soon prove useful as another means of distinction within a new, more equestrian, military structure.

The first recipients were Tribunes of the Praetorian Cohorts – such as Volusianus – and equestrian commanders of legions such as Publius Aelius Aelianus. So far as is known it was never bestowed on any officer of senatorial rank – senators were effectively excluded from service in the army soon after the first protectores appeared. Toward the end of Gallienus's reign centurions too were given this title. By this time it was used exclusively to distinguish officers who had served in units associated with Gallienus's imperial field army, the comitatus.

Collectively, the first protectores might be more properly defined as a collegio (i.e., a guild) rather than a military unit serving a specific military purpose. There is contemporary reference to a Princeps Protectorum, but it is likely that this officer's functions were not related to direct command in battle, but were instead ceremonial.

Holding commissioned rank in a unit attached to the comitatus seems to have been a prerequisite of admission to the body. These were men noticed by the Emperor and likely received accelerated promotion in his service.

The purpose of the protectores at this time seems to have been two-fold: (i) to encourage a personal loyalty to the Augusti (particularly Gallienus: there is no reason to suppose that Valerian had any real interest in this innovation) among the most energetic and charismatic officers of the Imperial Field Army and thus combat the spirit of military dissent that was tearing the Empire apart at this time; (ii) to promote ambition among the officer cadres of provincial garrisons, which would serve the same purpose.

== After Gallienus ==
After the death of Gallienus the protectores seem to have evolved into a military unit. The future Emperor Diocletian made his successful bid for emperor in 284 AD as commander of this body, challenging the Praetorian Prefect Aper whose power-base was the Praetorian Guard. However, membership of the corps still seems to have continued to be reserved for young soldiers marked out for rapid promotion. Constantine I was probably a member at the court of Galerius and Ammianus Marcellinus got his first step on the ladder of promotion in this capacity. Thus by that time it had acquired some of the characteristics of an Imperial staff college.
