= Heruli =

Early Germanic people

Map of the Roman Empire and contemporary indigenous Europe in AD 125, showing a proposed location of Heruli on the Danish islands

The Heruli (also Eruli, Herules, Herulians) were one of the smaller Germanic peoples of Late Antiquity, appearing in records from the third to sixth centuries AD. The best recorded group of Heruli established a kingdom north of the Middle Danube, in or near present day Lower Austria, close to the kingdom of the Rugii. These two kingdoms were among several which precipitated out of the Hun empire, following the death of Attila in 453 and the Battle of Nedao in 454. After the conquest of this Heruli kingdom by the Lombards, which happened in the period 493-511, splinter groups moved to Scandinavia and the region near present day Belgrade, which was at that time under Eastern Roman control.

Concerning the earlier history of the Heruli there are several common proposals which are the debated by scholars. Firstly, the Danubian Heruli are generally seen as descendants, or at least relatives, of the "Eluri" who lived near the Sea of Azov during in the 3rd century. In 267–270 these Eluri led two massive raids into Roman provinces in the Balkans and Aegean Sea, attacking not only by land, but notably also by sea. These raids were part of a longer series which also involved similar actions by other eastern European peoples, most notably the Goths. The equation of these "ELuRi" with the "ERuLi" was made by several Byzantine authors, and is still widely accepted, although some scholars such as the linguist Alvar Ellegård have argued against it. Secondly, Ellegård and others have argued that the Heruli were really a wandering warrior brotherhood, and not a tribe in the normal sense of the term. However, this proposal has also not gained many followers. Thirdly it has also long been proposed that the Heruli had their earliest origins in Scandinavia, mainly because a group of the defeated 6th-century Heruli moved from the Danube to Scandinavia. Fourthly, another old proposal is that there was a "Western Heruli" settlement based near the North Sea, possibly on the Lower Rhine or in Jutland. One reason for this is that in 286 AD, only a few years after the eastern raids, a Heruli army was defeated in an attack on Roman Gaul, which some historians speculate to have been an attack by sea.

What is more certain is that already in third century records of the Eastern European raids, "Eluri" were entered into the Roman military. In the fourth century, the "(H)eruli" were serving in its military in western Europe, spending time for example in Roman Britain and Gaul. One unit was paired with elite Batavi auxiliaries, and possibly already established at Passau on the Roman Danube frontier. Not far from this location there are also indications that the Herulian and Rugian kingdoms known from later centuries may already have been founded just outside the empire, in a region which had been decimated by the Marcomannic Wars of the late second century. As an elite force the Heruli and Batavi became the subject of an apparent dispute between Julian the Apostate the future emperor, and Constantius II, who wanted these forces for fighting in the Middle East.

After the Battle of Adrianople in 378 the Middle Danubian region was overwhelmed with armed groups and settlers from the east including Alans, Goths and Huns, and Rome lost control of the region. In 409 AD Heruli were among the "ferocious" nations, mostly from the Middle Danubian border area, that Saint Jerome described as occupying all of Roman Gaul. In the meantime, the new Hunnic empire of Attila established its base in the region, and some form of the Heruli kingdom probably continued to exist within it, along with the kingdoms of the Rugii and Gepids. After the death of Attila the Heruli fought in the Battle of Nedao, but it is not certain which side they took. They also participated in successive conquests of Italy by Odoacer (476), Narses (554), and probably also the Lombards, starting in 568. Under Eastern Roman command Heruli soldiers played important military roles in Balkan, African, Middle Eastern and Italian conflicts. Their last known kingdom at Belgrade was under Roman domination, and other Heruli integrated into larger political entities such as the Gepids and Lombards. The Heruli disappear from the historical record around the time of the conquest of Italy by the Lombards. In this period the Middle Danube was coming under the control of the Pannonian Avars, and Slavic languages were becoming common in that region.

== Name ==
In English, the plural "Heruli" can also be spelled as Eruli, Heruls, Herules, or Herulians. The name is sometimes written without "h" in Greek (Ἔρουλοι, "Erouloi"), Latin (Eruli), and English. Whether or not the h was pronounced is uncertain.

In the earliest mentions of them in 4th-century records, they were apparently called "Eluri", with the "L" and "R" reversed compared to later records, although there are doubts about whether the "Eluri" from the Sea of Azov were the same people as the later "Eruli" who later lived near the Danube. Dexippus, whose writings about these "Eluri" only survive in fragments, connected their name to a Greek etymology, claiming that they were named after the swamps (ἕλη, hélē) of their Azov homeland, and this may have influenced the early spelling.

According to modern scholars the etymology of the name is uncertain, but it is generally thought to be Germanic. Traditionally it has been speculated that it is related to the English word earl (see erilaz) implying that it was an honorific military title. This etymology is associated with the controversial speculation that the Heruli were not a normal tribal group but a brotherhood of mobile warriors, but there is no consensus for this, and it is based only on this proposed etymology and the reputation of Heruli as soldiers. There have been proposals which connected this etymology with Germanic words found in runic inscriptions in Scandinavia signifying a pronunciation erilaR, and there have also been proposals that the word is connected to Germanic words for werewolves and beings with magic powers. None of these proposals can be verified.

== Classification and language ==
The 3rd century AD "Elouri" were referred to by contemporary writers such as Dexippus, most of whose work is now lost, as "Scythians", as were the Goths and other allied tribes. However, this was not a linguistic classification. The Goths and other "Scythians" were never classified as Germanic in classical times.

In the 6th century, Procopius categorized many Eastern European peoples who were now settled near the Danube as "Gothic" (or "Getic") peoples, and he asserted that they shared a common language called Gothic. He included the Gepids, Vandals, Sciri, and even the Alans, who did not originally speak a Germanic language. In contrast, historians such as Walter Goffart have pointed out that Procopius never listed the Heruli among the Gothic peoples, and he explicitly believed their homeland was near the Danube. Only Jordanes linked the eastern European Eluri to the later Danubian Eruli. Nevertheless, modern historians often group the Heruli with the Gothic peoples. Mihail Zahariade has pointed out that one much later medieval source, Zonaras (about 1070–1140), did state that the Heruli were of Gothic stock.

In contrast to ancient scholarship, modern scholars have traditionally used language to classify peoples. The Heruli are generally believed to have spoken a Germanic language, as the Goths certainly did, and to have therefore been a "Germanic people" in the modern sense. However, Heruli personal names are one of the only direct sources of evidence for their language, and the strength of this evidence has been debatable. Many of the identifiably Germanic names are indistinguishable from Gothic names, and could be a result of Gothic influence (Gotisierung) when the two peoples were living in southeastern Europe. In the period following World War 2, such name analysis became a topic of scholarly debate in America, when Robert L. Reynolds and Robert S. Lopez criticized the assumption by Otto J. Maenchen-Helfen that Odoacer was a "German" and could not have been a "Hun", and within this exercise they accepted that "the Heruls apparently were Germanic despite the fact that most of the personal names of their leaders baffle German philologists", noting several Heruli names which appear to come from other languages. Maenchen-Helfen subsequently replied, calling the article a good corrective, but insisting among other things that the Heruli were Germanic. In the same edition the counter reply of Reynolds and Lopez clarified that they think there is not enough evidence to decide. The strength of the evidence has remained controversial. Walter Goffart repeated the claim that most of Heruli personal names can't be explained, although some names are "definitely Germanic". More recently, Prostko-Prostyński has argued in detail that "a large number of Herulian names are certainly Germanic", though he also identifies some which appear to come from other language families.

On account of possibly having likely spoken an East Germanic language related to Gothic, the Heruli are sometimes more specifically classified as an "East Germanic people". However, other scholars who connect the Heruli to Scandinavia have argued that they originally spoke a North Germanic language, and the name evidence remains inconclusive about the original Herule language.

== History ==
=== Possible Scandinavian origins ===
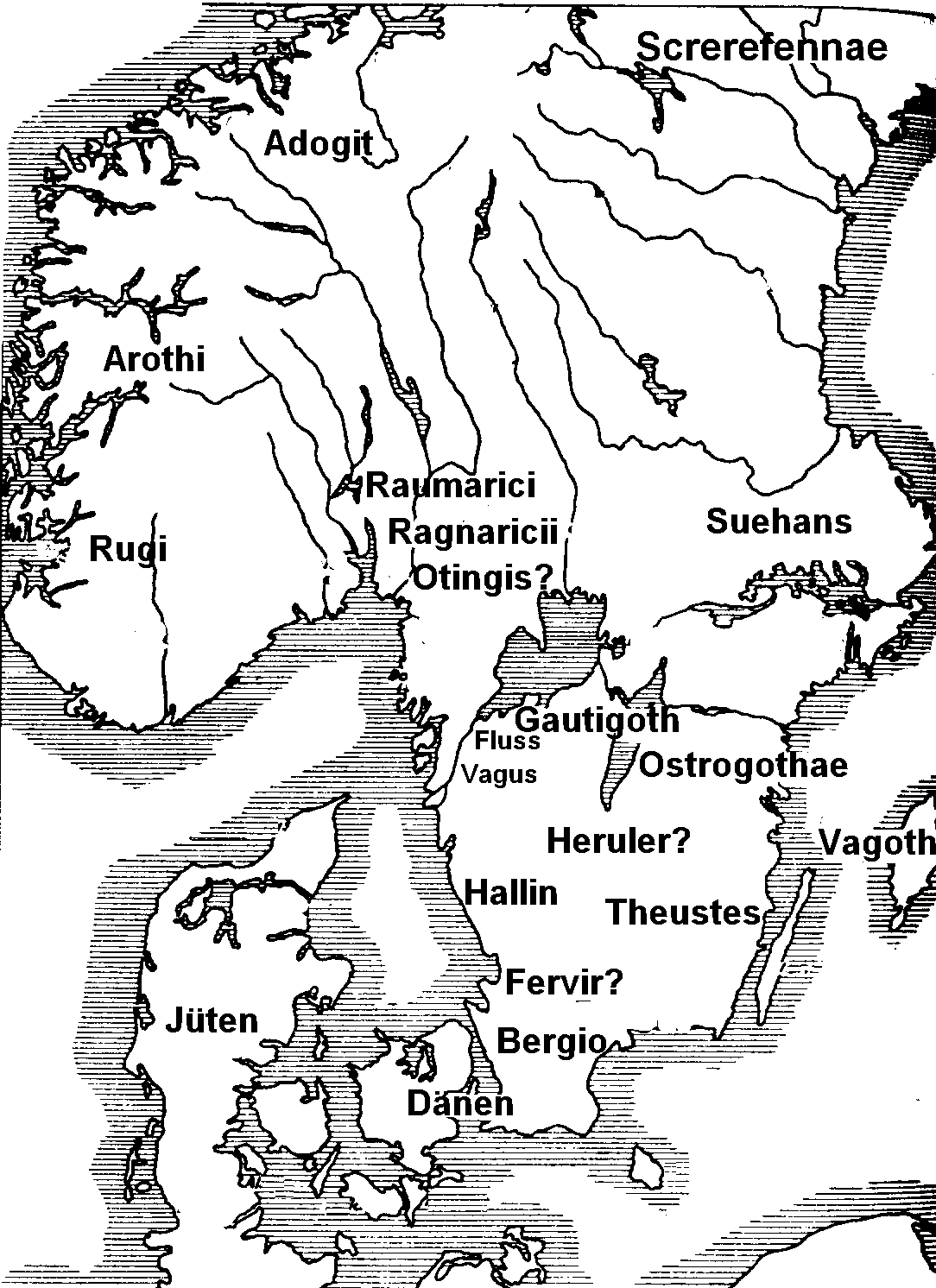
Map of Scandza based upon one interpretation of Jordanes, with the Herulian homeland located in the south of Sweden or on the Danish isles

Although the first clear contemporary records of the Heruli are either near the Sea of Azov in the 3rd century AD, or later on the Middle Danube, their ultimate origins have traditionally been sought in Scandinavia. The Heruli, or at least a part of them, are thus commonly believed to have migrated from the Baltic Sea to the Black Sea before the 3rd century. There is no record of this, or scholarly consensus, but their Black Sea neighbours the Goths, and their later Danubian neighbours the Rugii, are also both believed to have had their origins near the Baltic, and there are similar proposals that their ultimate origins were in Scandinavia.

A general idea that many non-Roman peoples in Europe had their ultimate origins in Scandinavia is derived from the 6th century historian Jordanes. He claimed that the Goths and Gepids both came from Scandinavia many centuries before his time, and he described it as being "like a workshop or even better the womb of nations" (quasi officina gentium aut certe velut vagina nationum). This narrative was very influential upon medieval writers, and modern scholars. Jordanes also specifically mentioned the Heruli in a discussion about Scandinavia, saying Heruli living there had been driven out of their own settlements in Scandinavia by the Danes (Herulos propriis sedibus expulerunt), although he does not specify when this happened. This is interpreted by modern scholars in at least two different ways.

- The expulsion happened centuries before Jordanes, and the Heruli origins are ultimately in present-day Denmark or southern Sweden.
- This expulsion from Scandinavia was not long before the time of Jordanes, and the Heruli involved may have been recent immigrants to Scandinavia, who had left the Danubian region after the Heruli kingdom there was destroyed. Such a migration is mentioned by Procopius, a contemporary of Jordanes, who mentioned that after the fall of the Danubian kingdom some Herules re-established themselves near present day Belgrade, among the Romans, while others moved north, crossing from the land of the Danes across the "ocean" to the "island" of Scandinavia ("Thule") where they became neighbours of the "Gauts". He also mentions that when the king of the Belgrade Heruli was later murdered, they sent an embassy to the Heruli in Scandinavia, and returned with a new king.

The account of Procopius still leaves debate open about whether the ultimate origins of the Heruli were in Scandinavia before they came to the Danube. However, while a migration to Scandinavia can itself be seen as evidence of an old and continuous connection between the Heruli and Scandinavia, some scholars are sceptical of this interpretation, noting that Procopius specifically says that the Heruli who moved to Scandinavia left the "home of their ancestors". In contrast, in 2021 Prostko-Prostyński argued that there is "no doubt" about Scandinavian origins. Even though Procopius does not explicitly mention it, "it is hard to assume they ventured so far north without a reason of such nature". In his review of Prostko-Prostyński, Roland Steinacher argued that this is debatable.

Ellegård, one of the scholars who argued that the expulsion involved immigrants whose real homeland was on the Danube, wrote that "the only thing we can say with reasonable certainty is that a small group of Eruli lived there [in Scandinavia] for some 38–40 years in the first half of the 6th century AD". (More controversially, Ellegård proposed that the evidence makes it most likely that the Heruli were actually "a loose group of Germanic warriors which came into being in the late 3rd century in the region north of the Danube limes that extends roughly from Passau to Vienna". This proposal has not been widely accepted.)

Other scholars have continued to see traces of the Herulian survivals in southern Sweden in the so-called Blekinge runestones, and in the Värend region northeast of Blekinge, as well as legal-historical and folkloric indications of Herulian influence. A controversial thesis sees the Heruli as the inventors and masters of the runic script, and a broad cultural influence throughout Scandinavia and Iceland.

=== The "Eluri" of the Sea of Azov ===
In 267/268 and 269/270 Graeco-Roman writers described two major campaigns by the "Eluri" into the Balkans and Aegean, which were among the last and biggest in a series of seaborne raids from the northern Black Sea coast starting in the 250s. These Eluri are normally equated to the later Danubian Heruli or Eruli. Although doubts have been raised about this link by Ellegård, Not only Jordanes in the 6th century, but also much later George Syncellus (around 800) equated them with the Heruli known in later times.

During the raids, Goths, Eluri, and other "Scythian" peoples took control of Black Sea Greek cities, and gained a fleet that they used to launch raids starting in the Black Sea itself, and going as far as Greece and Asia Minor. Although some historians in the past doubted whether there were really two invasions so close together, these invasions began in the reign of Gallienus (260-268 AD), and continued until at least 269 during the reign of Marcus Aurelius Claudius (268-269 AD), who subsequently took up the title "Gothicus" due to his victory.

In 267, a Heruli fleet departed from the Sea of Azov, past the Danube delta, and into the straits of the Bosphorus. They took control of Byzantion (the area of modern Istanbul) and Chrysopolis before retreating to the Black Sea. Emerging to raid Cyzicus, they subsequently entered the Aegean Sea, where they troubled Lemnos, Skyros and Imbros, before landing in the Peloponnese. There they plundered not only Sparta, the closest city to their landing site, but also Corinth, Argos, and the sanctuary of Zeus at Olympia. Still within 267 they reached Athens, where local militias had to defend the city. It seems to have been the Heruli specifically who sacked Athens despite the construction of a new wall, during Valerian’s reign only a generation earlier. This was the occasion for a famous defense made by Dexippus, whose writings were a source for later historians. Places sacked by the Heruli:

- Argos
- Athens
- Byzantium
- Corinth
- Chrysopolis
- Heraclea Pontica
- Lemnos
- Olympia
- Skyros
- Sparta

Further north, in 268, Gallienus defeated Heruli at the river Nestos using a new mobile cavalry, but as part of the surrender a Herulian chief named Naulobatus became the first barbarian known from written records to receive imperial insignia from the Romans, gaining the rank of a Roman consul. It is highly likely that these defeated Heruli were then made part of the Roman military. Recent researchers such as Steinacher and Prostko-Prostyński now have increased confidence that there was a distinct second campaign which began in 269, and ended in 270. Later Roman writers reported that thousands of ships left from the mouth of the Dnieper, manned by a large force of various different "Scythian" peoples, including Peuci, Greutungi, Austrogothi, Tervingi, Vesi, Gepids, "Celts", and Heruli. These forces divided into two parts in the Hellespont. One force attacked Thessaloniki, and against this group the Romans, led by Claudius now, had a major victory at the Battle of Naissus (Niš, Serbia) in 269. This was apparently a distinct battle from that at the Nessos. A Herulian chieftain named Andonnoballus is said to have switched to the Roman side, and this was once again a case where Heruli appear to have joined the Roman military. The second group sailed south and raided Rhodes, Crete, and Cyprus and many Goths and Heruli managed to return safely to harbor in the Crimea. Lesser attacks continued until 276.

Jordanes reported that these "Heruli" of the Azov area (who, he says, the Greeks call "Eluri") were later conquered in the late 4th century AD by Ermanaric, a Gothic king. According to Jordanes, they were led at that time by a king named Alaric. He describes them as being swift of foot, and swollen with pride, and "there was at that time no race that did not choose from them its light-armed troops for battle". Based on the lists given by Jordanes, Ermanaric's realm may also have included Finns, Slavs, Alans and Sarmatians. Herwig Wolfram suggested that the future Visigothic king Alaric I may have been named after this Herulian king.

In archaeological terms, these "Scythian" Eluri or Heruli are believed to have formed part of the Chernyakhov culture, which also included Goths and other peoples including Bastarnae, Dacians and Carpi. These Heruli are thus archaeologically indistinguishable from their contemporary neighbours the Goths.

=== Early "Heruli" in Western Europe (286-400) ===
The shield pattern of the Heruli seniores, a Late Roman military unit composed of Heruli.

Like the Goths, Heruli were already seen in Europe before the empire of Attila, both as raiders and as soldiers working under Roman authority. Unlike the Goths, the Heruli appear very early in western Europe. In 286 Claudius Mamertinus reported the victory of Maximian over a group of Heruli and Chaibones attacking Gaul. (The latter are known only from this one report unless they were the Aviones.) These forces had travelled from somewhere distant, as they were described by contemporaries as being the foremost barbarians in might, and most remote in location. Further reports of the Heruli in the west continue into the 4th century and based on this there is a proposal that there was a distinct Western kingdom of Heruli living near the Lower Rhine, who were not descended from the Heruli who lived near the Sea of Azov.

Already before the time of Attila the Romans established a Herulian auxiliary unit in the Western Roman Empire, and it has been argued that this implies that they were already settled somewhere in or near the empire. The Heruli seniores were stationed in northern Italy. This numerus Erulorum was a lightly-equipped unit often associated with the Batavian Batavi seniores. If there was ever a regiment called Heruli iuniores, then it is possible it was based in the Eastern Roman empire and it may have been one of the units which ceased to exist after the Battle of Adrianople in 378.

- In about 314, the Heruli (like the Sciri and Rugii) were already listed in the Laterculus Veronensis as one of the barbarian peoples living under Roman domination. Ellegård argues that this and other 4th-century sources indicate that several of Attila's future allies in the Middle Danube were already established in the 4th century. He proposes that the Heruli were already based somewhere between Passau and Vienna. Liccardo has criticized Ellegård's interpretation of the evidence, noting that they are placed (together with the Rugii) between the northern British Barbarians and the tribes of the Lower Rhine. On the other hand Ellegård believes that the Cosmographia of Julius Honorius, and the Liber Generationis are from a similar period and both listed the Heruli more specifically between the Marcomanni and Quadi, north of the Danube in the region where the Herule kingdom would later be found.
- In 360, Ammianus reported that Julian the Apostate the future emperor who then had command in Gaul as "Caesar", sent Herules and Batavi together with other light auxiliary forces to Britain. While there, Constantius II ordered Julian to send some of his best units including the Heruli, Batavi, and others, for fighting against the Parthians in the Middle East. Ammianus explains that this caused a revolution, leading Julian to become emperor, because the soldiers involved included many who had left homes beyond the Rhine and come to him under promise that they should never be led to regions beyond the Alps. Ellegård thinks is consistent with the Heruli having their homeland base near Passau (east of the Rhine), while Liccardo argues that these soldiers must have now lived west of the Rhine.
- In 366 the Batavian and Heruli units fought for the Romans against the Alamanni near the Rhine, under the leadership of Charietto, who died in the battle. The Batavi and Heruli had the same standard and it was lost in this battle.
- In 368 the Batavi and Heruli were once again in Britain, this time under Count Theodosius.

Ellegård argues that the association with the Batavi in this period should be seen not as a connection to the Lower Rhine, the original home of the Batavi unit centuries earlier, but to their quarters in this period which were at Passau (Castra Batava) on the Danube, not far from where the Heruli would later have their kingdom. Liccardo argues that even though "units were moved around and over time tended to lose any ethnic or geographical homogeneity" they could still give hints about the origins of ethnic groups.

In the late 4th century, large groups of Eastern European peoples including most notably the Goths and Alans, crossed the Lower Danube into the Roman empire, while others entered the Middle Danubian region, between the Carpathians and the Roman empire. The Huns and their allies also moved east and were establishing themselves near the Danube by 400. The Roman military was weakened and increasingly reliant upon barbarian forces. They were also internally divided, with a rebel emperor in Gaul, Constantine III, and open conflict between the Western and Eastern empires in the Balkans.

=== 5th century ===
Huns Territory in 450

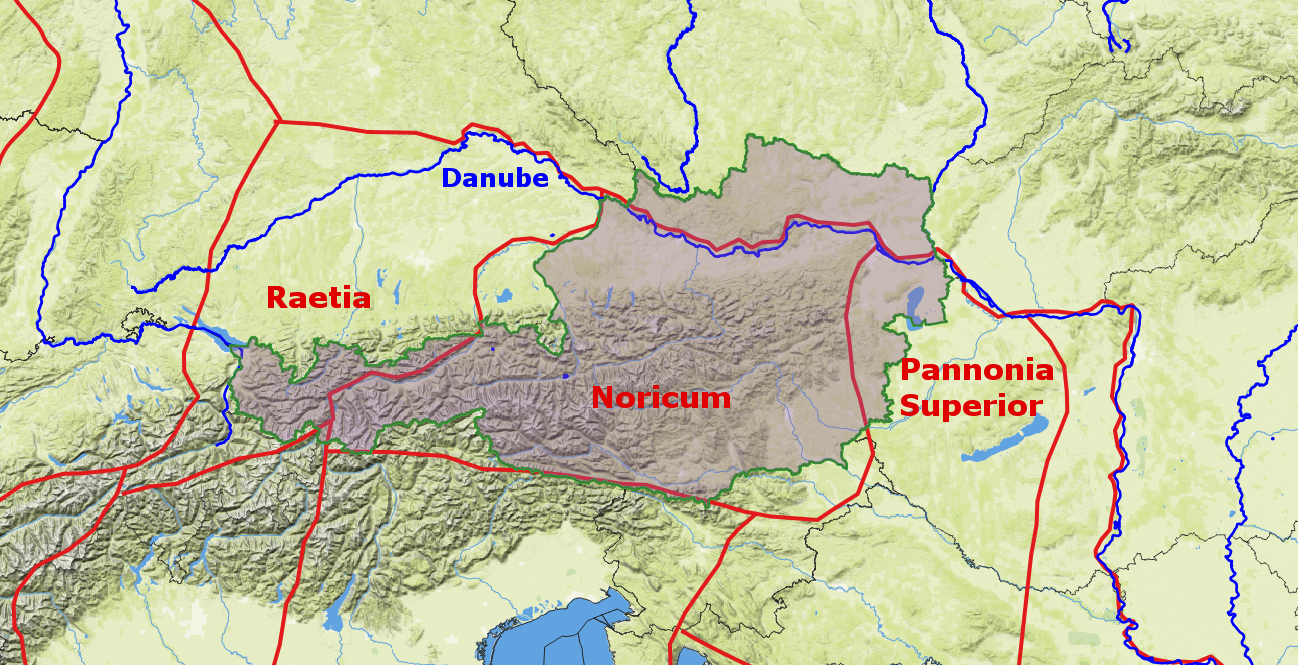
Roman provinces in the region of modern Austria

By 400 the situation near the Roman border in the Middle Danubian area had changed dramatically since the arrival of the Huns, Goths and Alans, and before 409, large numbers of "ferocious" peoples from regions near Pannonia, including the Heruli, Quadi, Vandals, Sarmatians, Alans, Gepids, and even provincial inhabitants from Roman Pannonia itself, are reported by Saint Jerome to have crossed the Rhine and occupied all parts of Roman Gaul. Many of these people later participated in establishment of the Kingdom of the Suebi in Iberia and the Kingdom of the Vandals and Alans in North Africa. During the same period when they moved to Gaul, a Gothic king Radagaisus built up an army in this region, and invaded Italy itself, making it difficult for Roman forces to defend Gaul or Iberia. In the Middle Danube area, many Heruli and the other peoples continued to live in the region including Gepids, Rugi, Sciri, and many of the Goths, Alans and Sarmatians, who had all come firmly under the command of the Hunnic empire of Attila by 450.

Far to the west of the Danube, two sea raids were made by Heruli around coastal northern Spain in the 450s, as reported by Hydatius. Some modern scholars have taken this as evidence of a western settlement of Heruli near the North Sea. However, it has also been seen as evidence that the Heruli were working with the Visigoths, and perhaps even Rome, against rebellious areas in northern Iberia. Halsall writes that it "must at least be a possibility" that the Herulian raids in Spain during this period "constituted part of a Romano-Visigothic offensive against the Sueves". These Suebi, themselves from central Europe, had recently established a kingdom on the northern coast of Spain, and the Visigoths coordinated with Rome against them.

In 451, although they were not specifically listed by Sidonius or Jordanes, Heruli are believed to have been among the peoples who fought at the Battle of the Catalaunian Plains between the Romans and Attila, possibly on both sides. Centuries later Paul the Deacon listed the subject peoples who Attila could call upon in addition to the better known Goths and Gepids: "Marcomanni, Suebi, Quadi, and alongside them the Herules, Thuringi and Rugii".

After the death of Attila in 453, his sons lost power over the various peoples of his empire at the Battle of Nedao in 454. The Heruli are listed by Jordanes as having fought at the Battle of Nedao, but we do not know if they took the Gepid or Ostrogothic side. They were subsequently among the several peoples now able to consolidate a kingdom near the Middle Danube. Procopius describes it as being north of the Danube. They ruled over a mixed population including Suevi, Huns and Alans. Compared to other Middle Danubian kingdoms in this period, Peter Heather has described this Heruli kingdom as "middle-sized", similar to the Rugian one, but "clearly not as militarily powerful, say, as the Gothic, Lombard, or Gepid confederations which generated much longer-lived political entities, and into which elements of the Rugii and Heruli were eventually absorbed". Peter Heather estimates that the Herulian kingdom could muster an army of 5,000-10,000 men.

In about 469 the neighbouring kingdoms of the Sciri and Suevi were badly defeated at the Battle of Bolia, against the Ostrogoths. According to some scholars the Heruli could have benefited, and been able to establish control of an area on the south side of the Danube, north of Lake Balaton in modern Hungary - an area which was nominally in Roman Pannonia. In contrast, Prostko-Prostyński thinks that the Heruli kingdom of this time was restricted to the area north of the Danube.

Shortly after 475 Sidonius Apollinaris reported the presence of Heruli at the Visigothic court of Euric in Bordeaux (reigned 466-484). They are listed in a poetic way together with other barbarians, from places as distant as Parthia, who Sidonius found looking for protection and patronage.

Latin	English
hic glaucis Herulus genis vagatur,	Here wanders the Herulian with his blue-grey cheeks,
imos Oceani colens recessus algoso prope concolor profundo.	who dwells in the uttermost retreats of Ocean and is almost of one colour with its algae-filled depths.

Scholars note that this passage surprisingly implies that the Heruli homeland is on the "Ocean". More generally the connection of these Heruli with the sea, so far to the west, is sometimes taken as evidence that these Heruli were not from the Danube or Black Sea. Steinacher, on the other hand, argues that the poetic references of Sidonius linking the Heruli to the sea might be "nothing more than a bookish reference to 3rd-century accounts of Herules" who attacked from the Black Sea. On the other hand, other scholars, such as Liccardo, emphasize that Sidonius lists the Herulians with Saxons, Franks and Burgundians—i.e., as if they were subjects or supplicants from Gaul, or nearby. Prostko-Prostyński argues that they were probably based in Jutland, because in another of his letters from this period Saint Jerome said that Hispania, fearing invasion, were reminded of the Cimbrian invasions of about 100 BC.

In 476, Odoacer, son of the defeated Scirian leader Edeko, and now commander of the imperial foederati troops in Italy, deposed the last Western Roman Emperor Romulus Augustus. He was seen as king over several of the Danubian peoples within the Roman military in Italy, including Sciri, Rugi, and Heruli. The Heruli in Italy suffered badly when Odoacer was defeated by the Ostrogoth Theoderic, who became the new king in 493. Paul the Deacon nevertheless mentioned Heruli continuing to live in Italy under Ostrogothic rule.

In about 480, according to the life story of Severinus of Noricum written by Eugippius, the Heruli attacked Ioviaco near Passau, which lay to the west of the Rugian kingdom, and is now on the border of Germany and Austria.

When Odoacer defeated the Rugian kingdom on the Danube in 488, according to Paul the Deacon the Lombards moved and occupied their country, and they stayed there a number of years. They then left and settled in a flat plain which modern scholars believe to be the Little Alföld region, now in Hungary. Procopius reported that by the time Anastasius became emperor in 491 the Heruli had forced the Langobardi and other surrounding peoples to pay tribute and no longer had anyone to attack in the area where they lived. According to him, only three years later, in 494, King Rodulf was pressured by his followers to attack the Lombards, despite their treaties. He died in the ensuing battle, and the Heruli kingdom came to an end. The Heruli had to move from the territory they had been holding. Many modern scholars believe however that the war, and the death of Rudulf, must have been significantly later than Procopius reports, because Theoderic, who ruled Italy from 493, had correspondence with Herulian royalty, preserved in the Variae of Cassiodorus, which are interpreted today as indications that he integrated the Heruli into a system of alliances which also included the Visigothic king Alaric II (reigned 484-507), who is mentioned in the correspondence. In one letter he adopted a Heruli king as an adult, gifting him with arms and calling this a tradition of the non-Roman peoples. Date estimates for the destruction of the kingdom have therefore ranged from 493-511.

The location of the 5th century Heruli kingdom near the Danube is never described in classical sources, but they imply that it shared a border with the Rugian kingdom that is described by Eugippius in his biography of Severinus of Noricum, stretching along the Danube in what is now Lower Austria, west of Vienna. Prostko-Prostyński argues that while many scholars assume they lived to the east of the Rugii, in southern Moravia or southwestern Slovakia, there is evidence that they lived further west, in another part of Lower Austria, or possibly in southwestern Bohemia. As evidence he notes that Eugippius reported that they raided to the west of Roman Noricum, implying that they had access without going though Rugian land. Also, the official correspondence of Theoderic implies that they were at some point in the period 493-507 in a position exposed to potential conflict with the Franks of Clovis. In contrast, proponents of a distinct Western Herulian kingdom near the Rhine note that the letter was also sent to the kings of the Thuringians and Warini—quite far to the north of the Danube, and more directly threatened by the Franks who are discussed in the letter; opponents emphasize that Theoderic was clearly concerned with a large part of central Europe, and that the Franks were in reality making inroads towards the Middle Danubian region in this period, threatening even Italy itself.

A panegyric delivered to Theoderic by Magnus Felix Ennodius in 507 indicates that large numbers of Heruli had been killed by the forces of Theoderic at their own settlements, after the Heruli had been involved in an attack against him.

=== 6th century ===
Balkans 6th century

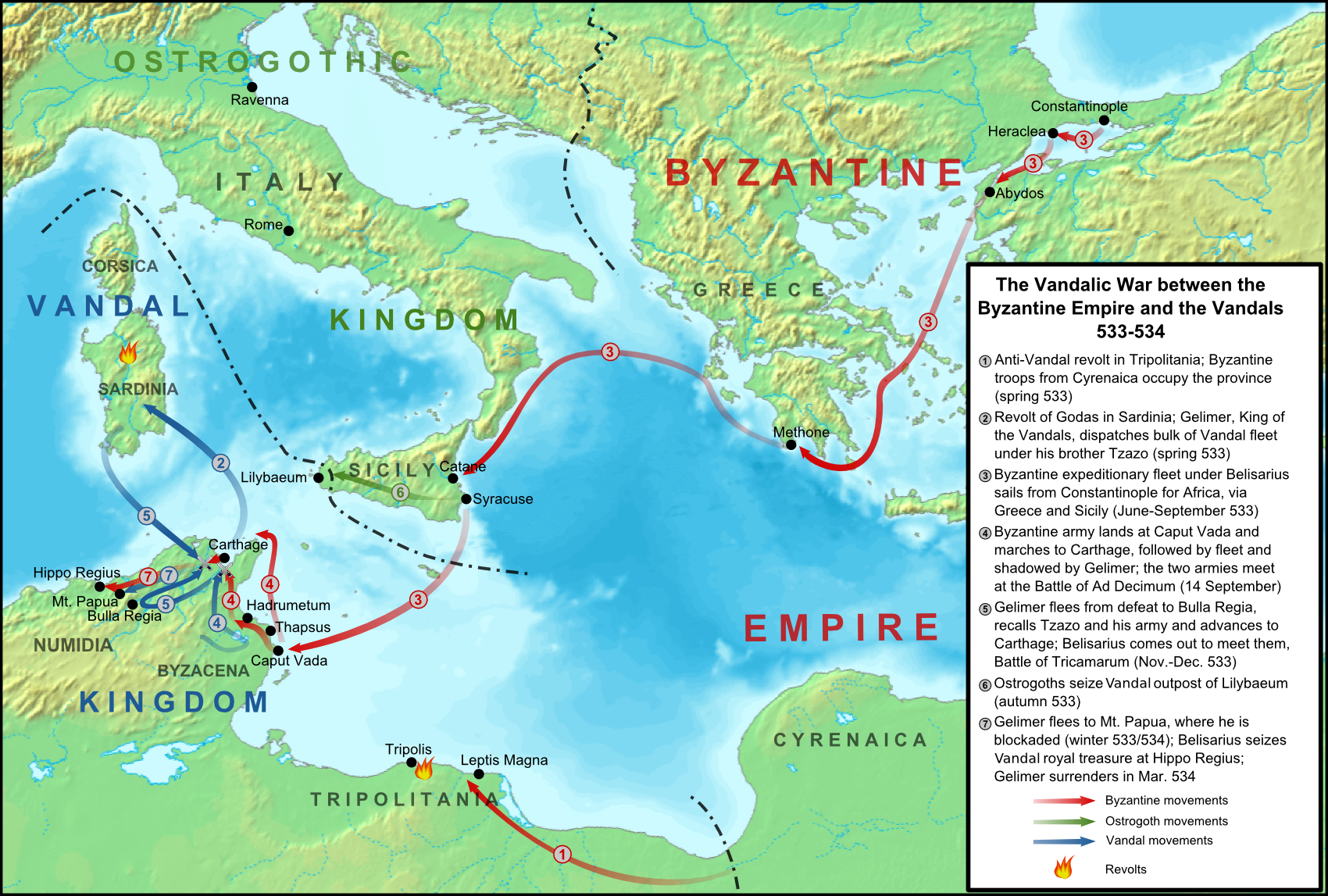
Vandalic War campaign map

Gothic War - First Phase, 535-540

Lazica in Late Antiquity

Army movements in the second phase of Justinian's Gothic War

After the Middle Danubian Herulian kingdom was destroyed by the Lombards, Herulian fortunes waned. According to Procopius they could not stay in the ancestral lands, so they moved around in the regions beyond the Danube, with their wives and children coming to territory where the Rugii had lived, but the land was barren and this led to famine. Scholars such as Prostko-Prostyński, interpret this to be Rugiland in northeastern Lower Austria, which had been emptied of population by Odoacer after 488. Others such as Steinacher believe it must be a region where the Rugians had lived only temporarily after they were defeated, and before they joined the Goths. The Heruli then moved to a region near the Gepids, as suppliants to them. However, the Gepids mistreated them, violating their women and stealing their property, so a large part of the Heruli crossed the Danube into Roman territory where they were welcomed by Emperor Anastasius I (reigned 491-518). Marcellinus Comes dates this to 512.

At this point the Heruli split. Another group including royalty went north and settled in Thule, which for Procopius meant Scandinavia. Procopius noted that these Heruli first traversed the lands of the Slavs, then empty lands, then the lands of Warini (Varni), followed by the land of the Danes, until finally crossing a part of the Ocean and settling near the Geats. Historian Peter Heather considers this account to be "entirely plausible" although he notes that others have labelled it a "fairy story", and given that it only appears in one source it is possible to deny its validity.

There is uncertainty regarding another Heruli group who are mentioned in the correspondence of Cassiodorus. Theoderic the Great ordered that they should be accommodated and assisted in Pavia in north Italy, so that they could travel further to the Gothic capital in Ravenna. The date is however unclear, and they may have been envoys from the kingdom of Rudolf, around the time of his fall. The letter specifies that the officials should "provide them promptly with ships of provisions for five days, that they may at once see the difference between Italy and their own hungry country".

Modern scholars believe the main group who entered the eastern empire were moved first to the area of Bassianae (near modern Donji Petrovci) in an eastern part of Pannonia north of Belgrade. Anastasius had recently recovered it from the Ostrogoths, who still occupied the rest of Pannonia, to the west. The Herules were attacked by Anastasius for treating the Roman population in a lawless way. Later, the remaining Heruli were given land near Singidunum (modern Belgrade) in Moesia by Emperor Justinian, after he became emperor in 527. Justinian integrated the Heruli into the empire as a buffer between the Romans and the more independent Lombards and Gepids to the north. Under his encouragement, the Herule king Grepes converted to Orthodox Christianity in 528 together with some nobles and twelve relatives. Procopius who felt that this made them somewhat gentler, also made it clear in his account of the wars against the African Vandals that some Heruli were heretical Arian Christians, like the Goths.

Heruli soldiers fighting for the Roman Empire were often mentioned during the times of Justinian, who used them in his extensive military campaigns in many countries. In 530, an Herulian cavalry unit under the command of Pharas fought under Belisarius in the Iberian War against the Persians, in what is now eastern Georgia, in the Caucasus. Pharas was a notable Herulian commander, described positively even by Procopius. Several thousand Heruli served in the personal guard of Belisarius throughout the campaigns.

In 533-534, Pharas and his Heruli also fought under Belisarius in Carthage against the Vandals, where Pharas played a very notable role in the Roman victory. Afterwards, in 536, 400 Heruli were involved in the failed revolt of Stotzas, incited by Arian priests according to Procopius. After this, the Herulian cavalry unit was disbanded.

Heruli also fought in Italy against the Ostrogoths, during the Gothic Wars. Narses brought a force of about 2000 to Italy in 538, commanded by Heruli leaders Aluith, Phanitheos and Visandus. When Narses left Italy in 539 the Heruli remained and first went to Liguria where they sold their slaves and animals to the Goths, and then linked up with another Roman general in Veneto. Under him they were then heavily defeated by the Ostrogoths in Treviso in 540, where the Herulian leader Visandus was killed.

In 542-543, during the Lazic War, Procopius mentions Heruli units fighting for Rome against new Persian incursions in the east. One of the Herule leaders was named Philemuth, but he died during this campaign and is therefore not the same as the later man of the same name.

A second Heruli force for Italy was recruited by Narses personally in 545, probably in Singidunum. It was led by a Herule named Philemuth. They were moved to Thrace, where they helped repel an invading force of Slavs, but it seems they were not shipped to Italy at this time.

By the early 540s, Grepes, who had been king of the Heruli in the Belgrade area, had apparently died along with most of his relatives, possibly during the Plague of Justinian (541-542). Procopius explained that in the 540s the Heruli who had been settled in the Roman Balkans killed their own king Ochus and, not wanting the new king assigned by the emperor, Suartuas, they made contact with the Heruli who had gone to Thule decades earlier, seeking a new king. Their first choice fell sick and died on the return trip, in the country of the Danes, and a second choice was made. The new king Datius arrived with his brother Aordus and 200 young men. Upon their return, the Singidunum Heruli decided to opt for Datius, and Suartas fled to Constantinople. Fearing the reaction of the Romans, the supporters of Datius, two thirds of the Heruli, submitted themselves to the Gepids. This period of rebellion against Rome lasted approximately 545–548, by which time a conflict between their larger northern neighbours the Gepids and Lombards had broken out. Justinian took the side of the Lombards and attacked the Gepids. 1500 Heruli fought for Rome under the command of Philemuth, and 3000 fought on the Gepid side. Before the Romans had left the empire they clashed with an Herulian force led by Aorda, and killed him. The Gepids and Lombards however quickly came to a new 2-year peace agreement, and the fighting stopped. The Heruli, or at least a significant part of them, continued to live under Roman control into the time that Procopius was writing.

There was another plan to use the forces under Philemuth in a new invasion of Italy in 550, which did not go through. Finally in 552 Philemuth and 3000 mounted Heruli were shipped to Italy where they participated in the conquest of the city of Rome. In 553 Philemuth died and was replaced by a kinsman Fulkaris, who died fighting Franks near Parma in northern Italy. Fulkaris was eventually replaced in 554 by Sinduald, an Italian "King of the Breoni" (a tribe in the mountains of Tyrol) who was said to be descended from the Herules who had long before entered Italy under Odoacer.

In 550, the Roman general Bessas entered the continuing Lazic War against Persia and a Herule named Uligangos led a Herulian force under his command. Uligangos and his Herules are last mentioned there in 555, when the Byzantine base at Archaeopolis was destroyed.

Suartas, no longer a king, but still a Herule general for the Romans, led Herule forces against the Gepids in 551/2 when they were finally defeated, and the Gepid state ceased to exist.

In 566, after the death of Justinian, Sinduald (or Sindval) the Herule military leader in northern Italy rebelled against the Romans, and was declared king of the Heruli. He was executed by Narses in 567. He was the last historically attested Herule.

After one generation in the Belgrade area, the Herulian federate polity in the Balkans disappears from the surviving historical records, apparently replaced by the incoming Avars. Some of the Heruli near Belgrade apparently became Roman provincials.

Peter Heather has written that:

by c. 540 being a Herule had ceased to be the main determinant of individual behaviour; the Heruli had ceased to operate together on the basis of that shared heritage, and different Heruli were adopting different strategies for survival in the new political conditions which even caused them to fight on opposing sides. After c.540, we still find small groups called Heruli fighting for the East Romans in Italy, and it is noticeable that the Roman commanders were careful to appoint for them leaders of their own race. Thus some sense of identity probably remained. That said, we are clearly dealing with a few fragments of the original group, and, in the prevailing circumstances, Herule identity had no future.

Along with the Rugii and Sciri, the Heruli may have contributed to the formation of the Bavarii.

== Representations in classical and early Medieval literature ==
Over several centuries Roman and Greek writers described the Heruli as a particularly physically imposing, violent, and undisciplined people.

In his panegyric written for emperor Maximian, Mamertinus described the Heruli and Chaibones who attacked Gaul in 286 as being the foremost barbarians in might, and most remote in location.

Jordanes, in his discussion of Scandinavia, reported that before they were expelled by the Danes the Heruli had been the tallest people in Scandinavia, even though the Scandinavians were taller than the people of Germania.

When discussing Ermanaric's conquest of the "Eluri" who Jordanes reported still living in the Sea of Azov in the 4th century, he says they were "a people swift of foot, and on that account were the more swollen with pride, for there was at that time no race that did not choose from them its light-armed troops for battle".

When describing the Battle of Nedao in 454 Jordanes says the Heruli formed a line of light-armed troops.

Similarly, the 5th-century writer Sidonius Apollinaris, in his panegyric for the emperor Avitus, said that when he was a young soldier he was a match for various barbarian peoples in their various typical skills, including the Heruli in running.

Magnus Felix Ennodius, a 6th-century bishop of Pavia, grouped the Heruli with the Franks and Saxons in his biography of the 5th century saint Anthony of Lérins. According to him, these three peoples had committed many acts "in the manner of wild beasts", and "enslaved to superstitious cults, this diversity of nations believed that their gods were soothed by human slaughter". They "were accustomed to offer up the deaths of their own kin" but anyone holding a religious office was seen as a choice offering.

The 6th-century writer Procopius was particularly negative about the Heruli, who he came into contact with when working under Belisarius in the Eastern Roman military. He emphasized that they were pagan, unlike their neighbours the Lombards, and he claimed that many of their customs were different from other men. In this category he claimed that the Heruli arranged for their relatives to be killed ceremonially when they were overcome by age or illness, and expected widows to hang themselves if they wished to have a good name and avoid offense to the husband's family.

Paul the Deacon, in his history of the Lombards, says that at the time that King Rodulf was defeated by the Lombards (approximately 494-511) the "Heroli were indeed at that time well trained in martial exercises, and already very famous from their many victories. And either to fight more freely or to show their contempt for a wound inflicted by the enemy, they fought naked, covering only the shameful things of the body".

After the Heruli were converted to Christianity in the time of Justinian Procopius said that they became gentler. However, according to Procopius they remained faithless toward the Romans, "and since they are given to avarice, they are eager to do violence to their neighbours, feeling no shame at such conduct". Furthermore he claimed that "they mate in an unholy manner, especially men with asses, and they are the basest of all men and utterly abandoned rascals". He argued that "no men in the world are less bound by convention or more unstable than the Eruli", explaining that because of their "beastly and fanatical character" they had suddenly decided to kill their king Ochus "for no good reason at all". Herulian kings had "practically no advantage over any private citizen whomsoever, but all claimed the right to sit with him and eat with him, and whoever wished insulted him without restraint".

Procopius, who had been with the 6th century Heruli on Roman campaigns, repeated the account of their light armour, saying that "the Eruli have neither helmet nor corselet nor any other protective armour, except a shield and a thick jacket, which they gird about them before they enter a struggle. And indeed the Erulian slaves go into battle without even a shield, and when they prove themselves brave men in war, then their masters permit them to protect themselves in battle with shields. Such is the custom of the Eruli".

== See also ==
- Järsberg Runestone

== Sources ==
=== Ancient sources ===
- Jordanes (1908). The Origins and Deeds of the Goths. Translated by Mierow, Charles C. Princeton University Press.. Also see Latin version: https://www.thelatinlibrary.com/iordanes1.html.
- Procopius (1914). History of the Wars. Translated by Dewing, Henry Bronson. Heinemann.

=== Modern sources ===
- Ellegård, Alvar (1987). "Who were the Eruli?". Scandia. 53.
- Goffart, Walter (2006). Barbarian Tides: The Migration Age and the Later Roman Empire. University of Pennsylvania Press. ISBN 9780812239393.
- Green, D. H. (2000). Language and history in the early Germanic world. Cambridge University Press. ISBN 0521794234.
- Halsall, Guy (2007). Barbarian Migrations and the Roman West, 376–568. Cambridge University Press. ISBN 9781107393325.
- Heather, Peter (1998), "Disappearing and reappearing tribes", in Pohl, Walter; Reimitz, Helmut (eds.), Strategies of Distinction: The Construction of the Ethnic Communities, 300–800, BRILL, ISBN 9004108467
- Heather, Peter (1994). Goths and Romans 332–489. Oxford Scholarship Online. doi:10.1093/acprof:oso/9780198205357.001.0001. ISBN 9780198205357.
- Heather, Peter (2007). The Fall of the Roman Empire: A New History of Rome and the Barbarians. Oxford University Press. ISBN 9780195325416.
- Heather, Peter (2010). Empires and Barbarians: The Fall of Rome and the Birth of Europe. Oxford University Press. ISBN 9780199892266.
- Liccardo, Salvatore (2024), "Who in the world are the Heruli?", Early Medieval Europe, 32 (3): 284–305, doi:10.1111/emed.12712
- Maenchen-Helfen, Otto (July 1947). "Communications". The American Historical Review. 52 (4). American Historical Association: 836–841. doi:10.1086/ahr/52.4.836. JSTOR 1842348.
- Neumann, Günter [in German] (1999). "Heruler: § 1. Philologisches". Reallexikon der germanischen Altertumskunde. Vol. 14. Walter de Gruyter. p. 468. ISBN 9783110164237.
- Nixon, C E V; Rodgers, Barbara Saylor (1994). In praise of later Roman emperors: the Panegyrici Latini. Berkeley: University of California Press. ISBN 0-520-08326-1 – via Internet Archive.
- Prostko-Prostyński, Jan (2021), A History of the Herules, Uniwersytet im. Adama Mickiewicza w Poznaniu Poznań, ISBN 978-83-232-3902-4
- Reynolds, Robert L.; Lopez, Robert S. (October 1946). "Odoacer: German or Hun?". The American Historical Review. 52 (1). American Historical Association: 36–53. doi:10.2307/1845067. JSTOR 1845067.
- Reynolds, Robert L.; Lopez, Robert S. (July 1947). "Communications". The American Historical Review. 52 (4). American Historical Association: 841–845. doi:10.1086/ahr/52.4.841. JSTOR 1842348.
- Sarantis, Alexander (2010). "The Justinianic Herules". In Curta, Florin (ed.). Neglected Barbarians. ISD. ISBN 9782503531250.
- Schwarcz, Andreas (2020), "Gotische und herulische maritime Einfälle in das Imperium Romanum in der zweiten Hälfte des 3. Jahrhunderts n. Chr.", in Mitthof, Fritz; Martin, Gunther; Grusková, Jana (eds.), Empire in Crisis: Gothic Invasions and Roman Historiography. Beiträge einer internationalen Tagung zu den Wiener Dexipp-Fragmenten (Dexippus Vindobonensis) in Wien, 3.–6. Mai 2017, pp. 389–401
- Speidel, Michael P. (2004). Ancient Germanic Warriors: Warrior Styles from Trajan's Column to Icelandic Sagas. Routledge. ISBN 1134384203.
- Steinacher, Roland [in German] (2010). "The Herules: Fragments of a History". In Curta, Florin (ed.). Neglected Barbarians. ISD. ISBN 9782503531250.
- Steinacher, Roland (2017), Rom und die Barbaren. Völker im Alpen- und Donauraum (300-600), Kohlhammer Verlag, ISBN 9783170251700
- Steinacher, Roland (2022), "Jan Prostko-Prostyński, A History of the Herules. Poznań, UAM 2021", Historische Zeitschrift, 315 (2): 477–478, doi:10.1515/hzhz-2022-1363
- Taylor, Marvin Hunter (1999). "Heruler". Reallexikon der germanischen Altertumskunde. Vol. 14. Walter de Gruyter. pp. 468–473. ISBN 9783110164237.
- Wolfram, Herwig (1990). History of the Goths. Translated by Dunlap, Thomas J. University of California Press. ISBN 0520069838.
- Wolfram, Herwig (2005). The Roman Empire and Its Germanic Peoples. University of California Press. ISBN 9780520244900.
- Zahariade, Mihail (2010), "A Crux in Bellum Scythicum. The Invasion of 267: Gothi or Heruli?", Antiquitas istro-pontica : Mélanges d'archéologie et d'histoire ancienneofferts à Alexandru Suceveanu

=== Further reading ===
- Banfi, Jaka (2022), "Kralji Herulov: vladarji ljudstva, ki ni »spisalo« zgodovine, in njihov regnum", in Cedilnik; Lovenjak (eds.), Na obzorju novega: območje severnega Jadrana ter vzhodnoalpski in balkansko-podonavski prostor v obdobju pozne antike in zgodnjega srednjega veka: posvečeno Rajku Bratožu ob njegovi sedemdesetletnici, Založba Univerze v Ljubljani, doi:10.4312/9789612970161, hdl:10807/236554, ISBN 978-961-297-016-1
- Christensen, Arne Søby (2002). Cassiodorus, Jordanes and the History of the Goths. Museum Tusculanum Press. ISBN 9788772897103.
- Drout, M. D. C.; Goering, N. (2020). "The Emendation Eorle (Heruli) in Beowulf, Line 6a: Setting the Poem in 'The Named Lands of the North'". Modern Philology. 117 (3): 285–300. doi:10.1086/707097. S2CID 214550424.
- Green, Dennis H. (2003). "Linguistic Evidence For The Early Migrations Of The Goths". In Heather, Peter (ed.). The Visigoths from the Migration Period to the Seventh Century. Boydell & Brewer Ltd. pp. 11–40. ISBN 9781843830337.
- Green, D. H. (2014). "The Boii, Bohemia, Bavaria". In Fries-Knoblach, Janine; Steuer, Heiko; Hines, John (eds.). The Baiuvarii and Thuringi: An Ethnographic Perspective. Boydell & Brewer Ltd. pp. 11–22. ISBN 9781843839156.
- Heather, Peter (2012). "Heruli". In Hornblower, Simon; Spawforth, Antony; Eidinow, Esther (eds.). The Oxford Classical Dictionary. Oxford University Press. p. 715. ISBN 9780191735257.
- Taylor, Marvin Hunter (1990). "The Etymology of the Germanic Tribal Name Eruli". General Linguistics. 30 (2): 108–125.
