= Publius Aelius Aelianus =

3rd century Roman general and governor

Publius Aelius Aelianus was a senior officer in the Imperial Roman army in the mid-3rd century AD who rose from lowly origins to become the prefect of a legion under Emperor Gallienus. He was one of the earliest beneficiaries of Gallienus's policy that effectively excluded senators from army commands in favour of career-soldiers of equestrian rank. His later life is obscure.

He was possibly procurator (i.e. Chief Financial Officer) of Epirus in the late-260s, but the foremost authorities query this identification. However, there are stronger grounds for believing that he was appointed a praeses (provincial governor of equestrian rank) in Africa, most likely under the Emperor Probus.

== Sources ==
The sum total of our knowledge of this man derives from five epigraph inscriptions from:

(a) A fragment of an epigraphic inscription from Poetovio (now Ptuj in Slovenia) that indicates that one AEL...I (a Vir Egregius, presumed to be Aelianus) commanded vexillationes (detachments) of the four legions of Pannonia;

(b) A sarcophagus dedicated by one Aelianus to the memory of his parents found at Obuda, a district of modern Budapest on the west bank of the River Danube which was the site of Aquincum Castrum, Pannonia Inferior, the base of Legio II Adiutrix;

(c) An altar dedicated one Aelianus to Herculi Augusti - i.e. to the Majestic Hercules - from Szentendre, the site of Ulcisia Castra an auxiliary fortress 12 km north of Aquincum;

(d) A stone from Photike in the Roman province of Epirus, nowadays a province of Greece; and

(e) A stone from Zucchabar in Algeria, in the Roman province of Mauritania Caesaensis.

The last four of these inscriptions are analysed in great detail by T. Nagy. This article largely reflects Prof. Nagy's findings and conclusions.

== Origins ==
It is likely that Aelianus was born at Aquincum in Pannonia Inferior which was the base of Legio II Adiutrix. His father was Martialis (P. Aelius) who had been a Custos Armorum (i.e. Warden of the Armoury) of Legio II (obviously he was described as ex custode armorum - i.e.'formerly Warden etc.' on his tomb) and his mother Fl. Agathe.

The gentilicum Aelius suggests that the family was either descended from one of the settlers who arrived in Pannonia in the century after the Roman conquest or from one of many native Pannonian clans that was given Roman citizenship when the future Emperor Hadrian was governor in the early years of the second century AD (around 106 AD). If the Aelius ancestor was indeed enfranchised during the reign of Hadrian or his successeor, Antoninus Pius he would have taken the name of the imperial dynasty as his own nomen as was the custom of the day. Thus by this interpretation of the onomastics Aelianus's clan had been Roman citizens for well over 100 years by the time he dedicated his parents’ sarcophagus and possibly more than 150 years and it is likely that the family had had connections with Legio II for generations.

== Early career ==
It can be safely assumed that, as a castrensis (i.e. 'Son of the Camp' - born of a serving soldier), Aelianus would have enlisted at the earliest age – i.e. 18-20 – probably in his father's legion. It is likely that he would have risen ex caliga – i.e. 'from the ranks of those who wear hobnailed sandals' (the footwear of legionary rankers). However, given that patronage and influence were major determinants (often the major determinants) of advancement in the Roman Army, it is not unreasonable to suppose that, as the son of a principalis, Aelianus would have enjoyed some advantages vis-à-vis his fellow-recruits that would have helped promote his career.

Nevertheless, the inscriptions cited make it clear beyond all doubt that Aelianus showed himself a highly capable soldier and probably a lucky one as well who prospered in the conditions of crisis that prevailed on Rome's northern frontiers in the middle years of the Third Century AD.

Although he probably enlisted in Legio II and certainly commanded it at a high point of his career, he is unlikely to have served solely with that legion. Like many of the soldiers who rose to prominence in his era, it seems safer to postulate that he rose through the centurionate receiving progressively more senior postings in different legions before he achieved primipilaris status (i.e. had been promoted primus pilus of a legion and had served a year at that rank) and then continued his career as an equestrian officer. Presumably after achieving equestrian rank as a primipilaris he had gone on to command vexillationes as a praepositus and had then been promoted to the rank of Praefectus Legionis - formerly Praefectus Castrorum Legionis. There is no evidence that he ever served as tribunus of cohortes of the Rome garrison often a prelude to ducal commands and equestrian governorships.

== Apogée in the Balkans ==
The first Aelianus inscription cited above is incomplete, but it mentions an AELI(us)... V(iri) E(gregii) DUCI(s) as the commander of detachments drawn from the four legions of the Pannonian provinces at Poetovio, a highly strategic fortress commanding the approaches to Italy through the Julian Alps. Whether or not this man is to be identified with P. Aelius Aelianus, the subject of this paper, is uncertain. Prof. Nagy and Jones et al. did not make the connection. However, Fitz believed that they were one and the same person). Fitz also suggests that the inscription should be dated to the period 262-4 AD - i.e. he was put in post in 262 after the expulsion of the Roxolani who had ravaged Illyricum after they had defeated and killed the usurper Regalianus and removed when he was made Praefectus legionis at Aquincum in 264.

Fitz's supposition that the Aelianus referred to was the P. Aelius Aelianus identified in the later inscriptions seems plausible, partly because: (i) it seems highly unlikely that there would have been two very senior officers of that name commissioning lapidary inscriptions in Pannonia within a very short period yet making no attempt to differentiate themselves from each other; and (ii) the Poetovio posting seems a highly probable career move for a man who was soon to be re-manifested as one of Gallienus's legionary prefects.

As the Praefectus Legionis II Adiutricis referred to on the Aquincum sarcophagus of Martialis and his wife Fl. Agathe(a), Aelianus is likely to have been one of the earliest beneficiaries of Gallienus's policy of excluding senators from army commands in favour of professional equestrian officers who would, more often than not, have risen from the ranks. Nagy argues that, as a non-senator, Aelianus would not have been given this posting prior to the Persian captivity in 260 AD of Gallienus's father and senior Augustus, the Emperor Valerian. The measures that opened the legionary commands to equestrian officers were taken by Gallienus during his sole reign - possibly in 261 AD. Nor could Aelianus have been given the command after 267 in which year Valerius Marcellinus was in command of Legio II. Nagy is inclined to ascribe Aelianus's promotion to the earlier part of this five year ’window’.

The Ulcisia altar describes the dedicator, P. Aelius Aelianus, as prefect of the Second legion, thus confirming that he was the same man as the one who had commissioned the sarcophagus of Martialis and Fl. Agathe. It adds the additional information that he was protector nostri augusti Gallieni – i.e. 'Protector of Our Majestic Lord Gallienus'. He was, thus, one of the earliest known recipients of that title. However, that the honorific should refer to 'Our Majestic Gallienus' rather than to 'Our Majestic Lords' (i.e. Valerian and Gallienus) as in the case of L. Petronius Taurus Volusianus shows that the inscription can be dated to the period of Gallienus's sole reign, but in the early part of that period when the honour was still awarded to senior officers rather than centurions as was later the case.(See Protectores Augusti Nostri. His membership of the Protectores nostril augusti Gallieni also suggests that when he commanded Leg. II Adjutrix that legion was brigaded with the Imperial field-army (comitatus) rather than serving with the provincial garrison of Pannonia Inferior - its usual station during High Empire period.

More important, perhaps, the inscription indicates that he was praefectus legionis agens vice legati – i.e. 'Prefect of the Legion acting on behalf of the (senatorial) legate' who we know was never to be appointed. However, the use of this terminology - presumably a formula to ensure that the prefect had the legal authority of a legate - seems to throw doubt on the proposition advanced by many historians that Gallienus had always intended the removal of senators from legionary commands as a permanent reform as opposed to an expedient resorted to in the crisis following the captivity of Valerian that was never reversed. In other words, it suggests Aurelius Victor was mistaken when he said that Gallienus had issued an edict incorporating the change in law. If such a law had been promulgated the formula agens vices legati would surely have been superfluous. Recent scholarship has suggested that the real purpose of Gallienus's Edict was not to exclude senators from army appointments - otherwise why did he continue to appoint senatorial provincial governors with supreme military authority within their provinciae(?) - but to make it possible for the Emperor to appoint equestrian officers to these positions thus broadening his powers choice at a time when the Empire was under particular pressure to find commanders with adequate military experience.

== Later career ==
The Photike inscription is in Greek and it identifies an 'Aelius Aelianus' as the chief financial officer (Lat. Procurator) of the province of Epirus sometime in the period 275-80 AD who had previously taken part in the census of the frontier province of Noricum. It is unlikely that the Aelianus who was a legionary prefect before 266 could have held these offices at a later date as the posts were lower in the equestrian career structure. However, the work of Brunt has thrown doubt on the theory that the Roman principate ever had a highly structured equestrian administrative service such as that envisaged by Pflaum and others and, in the light of this, it is possible to propose that Aelianus might have gone on from the command of a legion to a ducenarian procuratorship in the later 260s.

Less controversially, Nagy considered that the 'Aelius Aelianus' who was identified as V(ir) P(erfectissimus), praeses provinciae Mauritaniae Caesarensis (i.e. 'Best of Men, Governor of the province of Mauritania Caesarensis) in around 276 could well have been the same man as the praefectus legionis II in Aquincum of a dozen years earlier. He had by then been elevated to the perfectissimate, the second rank of the equestrian order. Nagy believed that this appointment would have been a promotion quite compatible with theories then current as to the equestrian career structure. Furthermore, it would also fit in with the known tendency to appoint military men to governing posts in Africa from the later years of the Emperor Probus onwards to deal with increased restlessness on the part of the Berber tribes of the Mauretanian interior. As Nagy observes, the Aelianus whose early experience of independent command had been against Sarmatian steppe nomads in Illyricum would have been well qualified to deal with Berber razzias in Rome's west African provinces.

== Rank and social status ==
As a Praefectus legionis vice legati Aelianus had been egregius - i.e. a member of the third grade of the equestrian order - but, as Praeses Mauritaniae, he was a perfectissimus. His promotion in rank had brought with it a promotion in his social status.

In addition it was not considered necessary to use the formula agens vice praesidis to emphasise that, as an equestrian, his rank as praeses was only 'acting'. This seems to have been a fairly recent development in the status of equestrian governors who were replacing senators in pro-praetorian provinces. For instance, not many years before in the 260s, as governor of the province of Pannonia Inferior, Lucius Flavius Aper had only had the status of vir egregius and the formula agens vice praesidis had been used to qualify his rank as though it was deemed necessary to emphasise that his governorship was only 'acting'.
