= Dexippus =

Greek historian, statesman and general (c. 210–273)

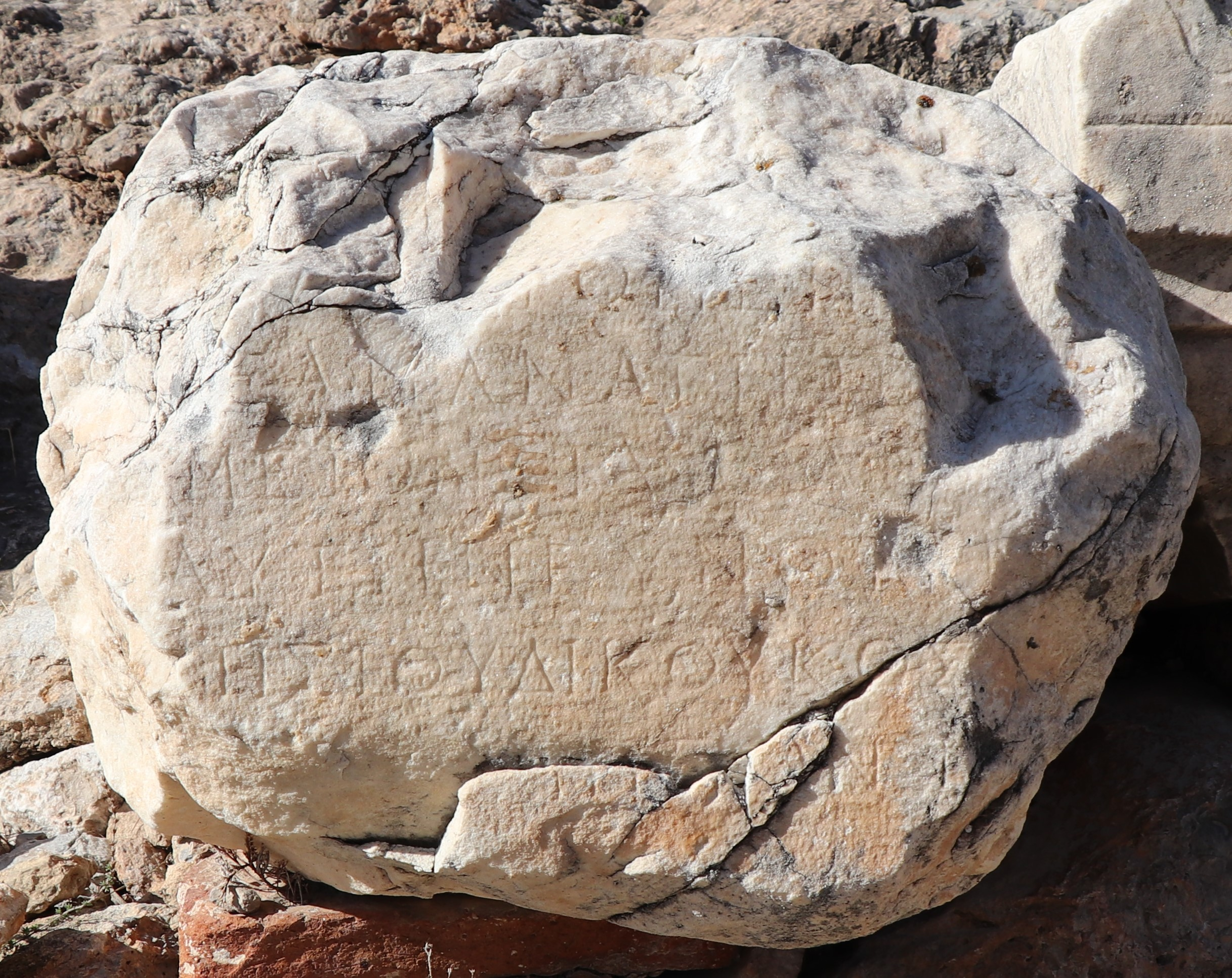
Fragmentary statue base erected for Dexippus at Eleusis (I.Eleusis 656 = IG II² 3671)

Publius Herennius Dexippus (Greek: Δέξιππος; c. 210–273 AD), Greek historian, statesman and general, was an hereditary priest of the Eleusinian family of the Kerykes, and held the offices of archon basileus and eponymous in Athens.

== Life ==
When the Heruli overran Greece and captured Athens (267), Dexippus showed great personal courage and revived the spirit of patriotism among his fellow countrymen. A statue was set up in his honour, the base of which, with an inscription recording his services, has been preserved. It is remarkable that the inscription is silent as to his military achievements.

Photius speaks very highly of the style of Dexippus, whom he calls a second Thucydides.

=== Works ===
Photius (cod. 82) mentions three historical works by Dexippus, of which considerable fragments remain:

1. Τὰ μετ᾽ Ἀλέξανδρον (The Events after Alexander), apparently an epitome of a work by Arrian
2. Σκυθικά (Scythica), a history of the wars of Rome with the Goths (called Scythians in archaizing language) in the 3rd century
3. Χρονικὴ ἱστορία (Chronike Historia) in twelve books, probably covering a thousand years to the reign of the emperor Claudius Gothicus (270)

The Chronicle was continued by Eunapius of Sardis, who opens his own history with a critique of his predecessor. The Chronicle also appears to be the primary source of the Historia Augusta between 238 and 270, but Paschoud has demonstrated that the author of the Historia Augusta sometimes attributes material to Dexippus falsely and so that evidence must be used with caution.

== Sources ==
- Martin, Gunther (2006). Dexipp von Athen. Edition, Übersetzung und begleitende Studien. Tübingen (edition and German translation).
- Mecella, Laura (2013). Dexippo di Atene. Testimonianze e frammenti. Introduzione, edizione, tradizione e commento. Tivoli.
- Millar, Fergus (1969). "P. Herennius Dexippus: The Greek World and the Third-century Invasions," Journal of Roman Studies 59: 12–29.
- Paschoud, François (1991). "L'Histoire Auguste et Dexippe," in G. Bonamente et al., eds., Historiae Augustae Colloquium Parisinum, 217–69.
