= Faustina =

Faustina may refer to:

== People ==
=== Saints ===
- Faustina Kowalska (1905–1938), Polish mystic, "Secretary of Divine Mercy"
- Saint Faustina and Saint Liberata of Como, 6th-century Italian nuns

=== Women from the Nerva–Antonine dynasty ===
- Rupilia Faustina, a daughter of Vitellia Galeria and the consul Lucius Scribonius Libo Rupilius Frugi Bonus
- Faustina the Elder (died c. 140), Annia Galeria Faustina Major, daughter of Rupilia Faustina and Marcus Annius Verus; wife of Emperor Antoninus Pius
- Faustina the Younger (2nd century – 175), Annia Galeria Faustina Minor, daughter of Faustina the Elder and Antoninus Pius; wife of Emperor Marcus Aurelius
- Annia Cornificia Faustina (123–152), cousin of Faustina to Younger and sister to Marcus Aurelius
- Annia Fundania Faustina (died 192), cousin of Faustina the Younger and Marcus Aurelius
- Ummidia Cornificia Faustina (141–182), daughter of Annia Cornificia Faustina and niece of Marcus Aurelius
- Vitrasia Faustina (died c. 180), daughter of Annia Fundania Faustina
- Annia Galeria Aurelia Faustina (147 – 2nd century), first-born daughter of Faustina the Younger and Marcus Aurelius
- Annia Cornificia Faustina Minor (160–212), another sister of Annia Aurelia Galeria Faustina
- Annia Faustina (daughter of Ummidia Cornificia Faustina) (165 – c. 210), noblewoman of Anatolian Roman descent and a wealthy heiress who lived in the Roman Empire
- Annia Faustina or Annia Aurelia Faustina, the great, granddaughter of Marcus Aurelius and Faustina the Younger, the third wife of Roman Emperor Elagabalus

=== Other Roman women ===
- Faustina (wife of Constantius II)
  - Faustina Constantia, daughter of Faustina and Constantius
- Faustina, a hagiographical version of Empress Valeria Maximilla, supposedly converted by St. Catherine of Alexandria

=== Other people ===
- Faustina Agolley, Australian television music presenter
- Faustina Acheampong, First Lady of the Republic of Ghana
- Faustina Bordoni (1697–1781), Baroque-era soprano nicknamed "Faustina"
- Faustina Maratti (c. 1670–1745), Italian Baroque poet and painter
- Faustina Sáez de Melgar (1834–1895), Spanish writer and journalist
- Faustina Pignatelli (died 1785), Italian physicist
- Faustina K. Rehuher-Marugg, Palauan curator and politician
- Doc Faustina (born 1939), NASCAR driver
- Faustina Woo Wai Sii (born 1992), Bruneian wushu practitioner

=== Fictional characters ===
- Faustina, a character in the 1969 novel A Void

== Other uses ==
- Faustina (1957 film), a 1957 Spanish comedy
- Faustina (1968 film), an Italian comedy
- Faustina (1995 film), a Polish religious drama
- Faustine (1991 novel), by Emma Tennant
- Faustina (gastropod), a genus of gastropods
- Faustina (play), a 1948 drama by Paul Goodman
