= Pomponius Bassus (consul 259) =

3rd century Roman senator and consul

Pomponius Bassus [...]stus (c. 220 – after 271) was a Roman Senator of Anatolian descent who lived in the Roman Empire.

== Life ==
Bassus was of Italian Roman and Pontian Greek ancestry, who came from a distinguished senatorial family. Bassus was the son of an elder Pomponius Bassus, the senator who served as consul in 211, and wife Annia Aurelia Faustina, who was a great-granddaughter of the Emperor Marcus Aurelius and wife Faustina the Younger. His sister was Pomponia Ummidia and through his mother, Bassus was a descendant of the Nerva–Antonine dynasty.

Bassus was born and raised in his mother's large estate in Pisidia. When Bassus' father died about 221, his mother was briefly married to the Emperor Elagabalus; the marriage ended by the end of that year.

Bassus was one of the most senior and well-respected senators of his day. He held his first consulship in 259 under the reign of the Emperors Valerian and Gallienus. There is a possibility that Bassus rose to prominence after his first consulship.

Bassus, being a senior consular, held various other senior positions, including that of proconsular governor of either Africa or Asia, possibly around 260. Under the Emperor Claudius Gothicus, Bassus was appointed corrector totius Italiae, and he was a comes augusti (or companion of the emperor). In January 271, Bassus shared his second consulship with the emperor Aurelian, which was the Emperor's first consulship. Either during or after Bassus' second consulship, he was appointed the praefectus urbi. Around this time, it appears Bassus was also the princeps senatus.

Bassus married Pomponia Gratidia, by whom he had a daughter, Pomponia Bassa (born c. 250). His daughter married Lucius Septimius Severus (born c. 245), son of a Lucius Septimius (born c. 210) and paternal grandson of Gaius Septimius Severus Aper. Their son was Septimius Bassus.

== Ancestry ==
Ancestors of Pomponius Bassus [...]stus

4. Gaius Pomponius Bassus Terentianus
2. Pomponius Bassus
1. Pomponius Bassus [...]stus
24. Gnaeus Claudius Severus Arabianus
12. Gnaeus Claudius Severus
6. Tiberius Claudius Severus Proculus
26. Marcus Aurelius Antoninus (brother of 31)
13. Annia Galeria Aurelia Faustina
27. Annia Galeria Faustina Minor
3. Annia Aurelia Faustina
7. Annia Faustina
30. Gaius Ummidius Quadratus Annianus Verus
15. Ummidia Cornificia Faustina
31. Annia Cornificia Faustina (sister of 26)

== Sources ==
- Alaric Watson, Aurelian the third century. Routledge, 1999.
- William M. Ramsay, The Cities and Bishoprics of Phyrgia: Being an Essay of the Local History of Phrygia from the Earliest Times to the Turkish Conquest, Volume 1. 2004

Political offices
Preceded by Marcus Nummius Tuscus, Mummius Bassus	Consul of the Roman Empire; 259 with Aemilianus	Succeeded by Publius Cornelius Saecularis, Gaius Iunius Donatus, Postumus, Honoratianus
Preceded by Flavius Antiochianus, Virius Orfitus, Victorinus	Consul of the Roman Empire; 271 with Aurelian, Tetricus I	Succeeded by Titus Flavius Postumius Quietus, Junius Veldumnianus, Tetricus I
