= Annia Faustina (disambiguation) =

Annia Faustina was a consort of Roman emperor Elagabalus.

Annia Faustina may also refer to:

- Annia Galeria Faustina the Elder, consort of emperor Antoninus Pius
- Annia Galeria Faustina the Younger, consort of emperor Marcus Aurelius
- Annia Cornificia Faustina, sister of emperor Marcus Aurelius
- Annia Cornificia Faustina Minor, daughter emperor Marcus Aurelius and Faustina the Younger
- Annia Galeria Aurelia Faustina, daughter emperor Marcus Aurelius and Faustina the Younger
- Annia Fundania Faustina, paternal cousin of emperor Marcus Aurelius and Annia Cornificia Faustina
- Annia Faustina (daughter of Ummidia Cornificia Faustina)
