= Pomponia Ummidia =

3rd century prominent Roman noblewoman

Pomponia Ummidia (c. 219-after 275) was an Anatolian Roman noblewoman and was a prominent figure in Rome during the reigns of the Roman Emperors Gallienus, Claudius Gothicus, Quintillus and Aurelian. She lived in the period the Crisis of the Third Century in the Roman Empire.

== Life ==
Pomponia Ummidia came from a distinguished senatorial family. She was the daughter of the Roman Senator Pomponius Bassus and the wealthy heiress Annia Aurelia Faustina, while her brother was the Roman Senator Pomponius Bassus. She was of Italian Roman and Pontian Greek ancestry.

The paternal great-grandparents of her mother were the Roman Emperor Marcus Aurelius and Roman Empress Faustina the Younger. Through her mother, Pomponia Ummidia was a descendant of the former ruling Nerva–Antonine dynasty of the Roman Empire.

Her cognomen Ummidia reveals that she was a distant relative to the Ummidia gens. Her mother named her this cognomen and names her in honor of three late relatives from the gens, who were:

- Gaius Ummidius Quadratus Annianus Verus, a Roman Senator who served as a suffect consul in 146 who married Marcus Aurelius' sister, Annia Cornificia Faustina, who was his cousin, as his cognomini Annianus Verus suggest
- Ummidia Cornificia Faustina, the daughter of Gaius Ummidius Quadratus Annianus Verus and wife and cousin Annia Cornificia Faustina, she was the niece of Marcus Aurelius and the maternal grandmother of Annia Aurelia Faustina
- Marcus Ummidius Quadratus Annianus Verus, b. 138, ordinary consul in 167, son of Gaius Ummidius Quadratus Annianus Verus, the brother of Ummidia Cornificia Faustina and the maternal nephew of Roman Emperor Marcus Aurelius
- Marcus Claudius Ummidius Quadratus Annianus Verus, b. abt. 167, son of Gnaeus Claudius Severus, ordinary consul in 167, and adopted son of Marcus Ummidius Quadratus Annianus Verus, his father's colleague as ordinary consul in 167

She along with her brother, were born and raised in her mother's large estate in Pisidia. The estate she and her brother was born and raised in, is one of a number of estates in Pisidia called the Cyllanian Estates. These estates were very large properties and existed from the time of the Roman Dictator of the Roman Republic, Lucius Cornelius Sulla (c. 138 BC-78 BC).

When her father died in 221, her mother was briefly married to the Roman Emperor Elagabalus. By the end of 221, Elagabalus had ended their marriage by divorcing her mother.

When Annia Aurelia Faustina died, Pomponia Ummidia inherited her mother's estate and the fortune of her mother. By this means, she became a very wealthy heiress. According to the inscriptions found on the estate, Pomponia Ummidia is named as the heiress of the estate, inheriting the estate from her parents. These inscriptions reveal that Pomponia Ummidia married a Greek Politician called Flavius Antiochianus. Flavius Antiochianus was an active politician in the reigns of the four above mentioned Roman Emperors. She spent her time between Rome and Pisidia. According to the inscriptions, Pomponia Ummidia appears to have been a virtuous person in character. It is unknown whether Pomponia Ummidia bore any of Flavius Antiochianus' children.

== Sources ==
- Alaric Watson, Aurelian the third century (Routledge, 1999)
- William M. Ramsay, The Cities and Bishoprics of Phyrgia: Being an Essay of the Local History of Phrygia from the Earliest Times to the Turkish Conquest Volume One, Part One
