= Fundania gens =

Ancient Roman plebeian family

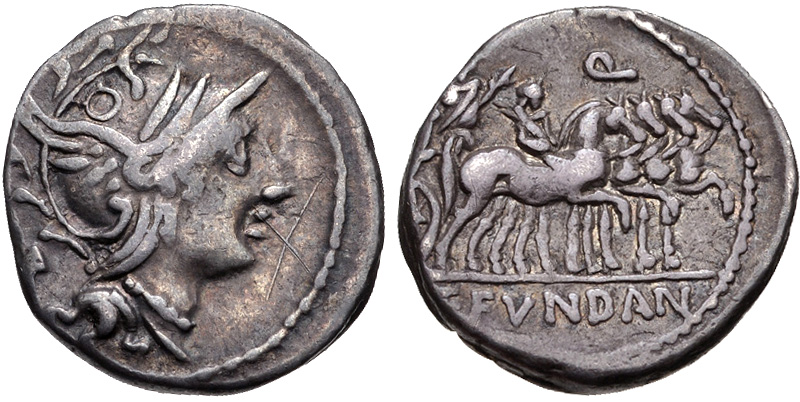
Denarius of Gaius Fundanius, 101 BC. The obverse depicts the head of Roma, while the reverse depicts Gaius Marius as triumphator in a chariot; the young man on horseback is probably his son. Marius was awarded this triumph for his victory over the Teutoni.

The gens Fundania was a plebeian family at Ancient Rome, which first appears in history in the second half of the third century BC. Although members of this gens occur well into imperial times, and Gaius Fundanius Fundulus obtained the consulship in BC 243, the Fundanii were never amongst the more important families of the Roman state.

== Origin ==
The nomen Fundanius is derived from the surname Fundanus, originally designating a resident of Fundi, a city of southern Latium, which was granted civitas sine suffragio at the close of the Latin War in 338 BC. The ancestors of the Fundanii probably came to Rome from Fundi, perhaps soon after the conclusion of the Latin War.

== Praenomina ==
The main praenomina of the Fundanii were Gaius and Marcus. Other praenomina appear occasionally, including Quintus among the earliest of the Fundanii, and Lucius in imperial times. All of these were very common names throughout Roman history.

== Branches and cognomina ==
The only cognomen used by the Fundanii under the Republic is Fundulus, a sausage, belonging to a large class of surnames derived from the names of familiar objects and animals. Lamia, a surname of Lucius Fundanius Aelianus, consul in AD 116, was inherited from the Aelia gens, where it was a regular cognomen.

== Members ==
This list includes abbreviated praenomina. For an explanation of this practice, see filiation.

=== Fundanii Funduli ===
- Quintus Fundanius Fundulus, grandfather of Gaius Fundanius Fundulus, the consul of 243 BC.
- Gaius Fundanius Q. f. Fundulus, the father of Gaius Fundanius Fundulus.
- Gaius Fundanius C. f. Q. n. Fundulus, consul in 243 BC. As plebeian aedile in 246, he and his colleague, Tiberius Sempronius Gracchus, had impeached Claudia, daughter of Appius Claudius Caecus, and imposed a heavy fine, which was used to build a temple to Libertas on the Aventine Hill. As consul, Fundanius went into Sicily to oppose Hamilcar Barca during the First Punic War. After first refusing Hamilcar's request for a truce for the interment of the dead, Fundanius relented and asked Hamilcar for the same terms, which the Carthaginian granted.
- Marcus Fundanius Fundulus, plebeian aedile in 213 BC, together with his colleague, Lucius Villius Tappulus, accused certain Roman matrons before the comitia tributa of a disorderly life, and procured their banishment.

=== Others ===
- Marcus Fundanius, tribune of the plebs in BC 195, together with his colleague, Lucius Valerius, proposed the abolition of the lex Oppia, a sumptuary law restricting the dress and manners of Roman women. They were opposed by the tribunes Marcus and Publius Junius Brutus, and by the consul Marcus Porcius Cato, but were vigorously supported by the Roman matrons, and by the other consul, Lucius Valerius Flaccus; and the law was rescinded.
- Gaius Fundanius, quaestor in 101 BC. He minted coins during his magistracy, which show his support of Gaius Marius. He was the first moneyer to depict a living Roman on coins.
- Gaius Fundanius C. f., father-in-law of Marcus Terentius Varro, in whose dialogue De Re Rustica he appears as one of the speakers. From Varro's description it appears that Fundanius was a scholar, who was acquainted with at least the statistics of agriculture. Varro also cited him in one of his philological treatises. He was probably senator in 81 and tribune of the plebs in 68.
- Fundania C. f. C. n., the wife of Varro, had purchased an estate, and Varro composed his three books, De Re Rustica, as a manual for her instruction in its management. The first book, De Agricultura, is dedicated to her.
- Marcus Fundanius, defended by Cicero in BC 65. The fragments of Cicero's oration do not enable us to understand either the nature of the charge or the result of the trial. Cicero's brother, Quintus, wrote that Fundanius would be of service to Cicero in his upcoming election for the consulship. He may be the same Fundanius mentioned by Quintus when he was serving as proconsul of Asia in 59.
- Gaius Fundanius (M. f.), a friend of Cicero; possibly the same as the eques Gaius Fundanius, who deserted Gnaeus Pompeius a few days before the Battle of Ategua, and went over to Caesar in BC 45.
- Marcus Fundanius, known from lead tokens he minted in Spain in the first century BC.
- Gaius Fundanius, a writer of comedies in the age of Augustus. Horace praises his management of the slaves and intrigantes of the comic drama.
- Lucius Fundanius Lamia Aelianus, consul in AD 116, during the reign of Trajan, and governor of Asia from 131 to 132. The route of his descent from the Fundanii is unclear, but the nomen was passed down to several of his descendants.
- Fundania L. f., wife of Marcus Annius Libo, the uncle of Marcus Aurelius. She had two children: Marcus Annius Libo, legate in Syria in AD 162, and Annia Fundania Faustina. After the elder Libo's death, Lucius Verus gave Fundania in marriage to Agaclytus, a freedman of Marcus Aurelius, quite against the latter's wishes.
- Annia Fundania Faustina, married Titus Pomponius Proculus Vitrasius Pollio, consul in AD 151, and was the mother of Titus Fundanius Vitrasius Pollio, and Vitrasia Faustina. Both of Faustina's children were put to death by Commodus in 182, ostensibly for conspiring against him, while Faustina herself was put to death on Commodus' orders in 192, not long before his assassination.
- Titus Fundanius Vitrasius Pollio, put to death along with his sister, Vitrasia Faustina, in AD 182, on the orders of his cousin, the emperor Commodus, who believed that they were conspiring against him.

== See also ==
- List of Roman gentes

== Bibliography ==
- Marcus Terentius Varro, Rerum Rusticarum, Fragmenta.
- Marcus Tullius Cicero, Epistulae ad Quintum Fratrem, Fragmenta.
- Quintus Tullius Cicero, De Petitione Consulatus (attributed).
- Gaius Julius Caesar, De Bello Hispaniensis (attributed).
- Quintus Horatius Flaccus (Horace), Satirae (Satires).
- Titus Livius (Livy), History of Rome.
- Diodorus Siculus, Bibliotheca Historica (Library of History).
- Aulus Gellius, Noctes Atticae (Attic Nights).
- Lucius Cassius Dio Cocceianus (Cassius Dio), Roman History.
- Aelius Lampridius, Aelius Spartianus, Flavius Vopiscus, Julius Capitolinus, Trebellius Pollio, and Vulcatius Gallicanus, Historia Augusta (Augustan History).
- Dictionary of Greek and Roman Biography and Mythology, William Smith, ed., Little, Brown and Company, Boston (1849).
- George Davis Chase, "The Origin of Roman Praenomina", in Harvard Studies in Classical Philology, vol. VIII, pp. 103–184 (1897).
- Wilhelm Dittenberger, Orientis Graeci Inscriptiones Selectae (Select Inscriptions from the Greek East, abbreviated OGIS), Leipzig (1905).
- T. Robert S. Broughton, The Magistrates of the Roman Republic, American Philological Association (1952–1986).
- Ronald Syme, "Ten Tribunes", in Journal of Roman Studies, vol. 53 (1963), pp. 55–60.
- E. Mary Smallwood, Documents Illustrating the Principates of Nerva, Trajan, and Hadrian, Cambridge University Press (1966).
- Michael Crawford, Roman Republican Coinage, Cambridge University Press (1974, 2001).
- Werner Eck, "Jahres- und Provinzialfasten der senatorischen Statthalter von 69/70 bis 138/139" (Annual and Provincial Fasti of the Senatorial Governors from AD 69/70 to 138/139), in Chiron, vol. 12 (1982).
- Robert K. Sherk, Translated Documents of Greece and Rome, vol. 4: Rome and the Greek East to the Death of Augustus, Cambridge (1984).
- Antón Casariego, Gonzalo Cores, Francisco Pliego, Catalogo de plomos monetiformes de la Hispanica antigva, Madrid, 1987.
