= Empress Faustina =

Empress Faustina may refer to the following Roman empresses:

- Faustina the Elder, consort of emperor Antoninus Pius
- Faustina the Younger, consort of emperor Marcus Aurelius
- Annia Faustina, consort of emperor Elagabalus
- Faustina, consort of Constantius II

== See also ==
- Empress Fausta (disambiguation)
- Annia Faustina (disambiguation)
