= Pomponius Bassus =

Pomponius Bassus may refer to:

- Pomponius Bassus (consul 211), Roman senator and consul
- Pomponius Bassus (consul 259 & 271), Roman senator and consul
- Gaius Pomponius Bassus Terentianus, Roman senator and suffect consul c. 193
- Lucius Pomponius Bassus, Roman senator and suffect consul 118
- Titus Pomponius Bassus, Roman senator and suffect consul 94; see Galatia (Roman province)
