= Tiberius Claudius Severus Proculus =

Roman senator (c. 163 – c. 218)

Tiberius Claudius Severus Proculus (about 163 – by 218) was a Roman Senator. Via his mother he was a grandson of Emperor Marcus Aurelius, but he played only a limited role in dynastic politics.

== Descent and family ==
Severus Proculus was of noble descent, born in a wealthy and prominent family in Pompeiopolis, a city in the Roman province of Galatia. He was the son of the Pontian Greek Senator and Peripatetic philosopher, Gnaeus Claudius Severus, and his second wife, the princess Annia Galeria Aurelia Faustina, daughter of Marcus Aurelius. He had a paternal half-brother called Marcus Claudius Ummidius Quadratus, from his father's first marriage, who was adopted by Marcus Ummidius Quadratus Annianus, consul in 167, a nephew of Marcus Aurelius.

His paternal grandfather, Gnaeus Claudius Severus Arabianus, was also a Senator and Peripatetic philosopher, and one of the teachers of Marcus Aurelius, whom he later befriended. His maternal grandparents were Marcus Aurelius and Faustina the Younger. Through his mother, Severus Proculus was a relative to the ruling Nerva–Antonine dynasty of the Roman Empire and among his maternal aunts and uncles were the Empress Lucilla and Emperor Commodus.

== Life ==
Severus Proculus was born and raised in Pompeiopolis. It is unknown whether he ever followed the philosophy of his father and grandfather.

It appears that Severus Proculus wasn't involved in any of the several plots to kill or overthrow Commodus. By the time his maternal uncle was assassinated in December 192, Severus was one of Commodus' few remaining living male relatives, but he was completely ignored as a potential successor.

In 193, after the deaths of Pertinax and Didius Julianus, Septimius Severus finally acceded to the throne, founding the Severan dynasty. During his reign (193-211), Severus Proculus served as a Senator and in 200 served as an ordinary consul.

After that, he married his wealthy maternal second cousin Annia Faustina, granddaughter of Marcus Aurelius' sister, Annia Cornificia Faustina. They settled on his wife's large estate in Pisidia, where an honorific inscription, dated to 207, was found attesting to their ownership.

Around 201, the couple had a daughter, Annia Aurelia Faustina, curiously not named after Severus. It appears that he named her in honor of his mother's family, the gentes Aurelia and Annia, probably to honor their links to the Nerva–Antonine dynasty. It seems that they did not have any more children.

About 216, Severus Proculus may have made a political alliance with a Senator who was a member of the Pomponia gens and married his daughter to Pomponius Bassus. Later, in 221, Annia would briefly become the third wife of Emperor Elagabalus (r. 218–222).

== Sources ==
- Anthony Richard Birley, Marcus Aurelius, revised edition. Routledge, 2000.
- Anthony Richard Birley, Septimius Severus: the African emperor. Routledge, 1999.
- Albino Garzetti, From Tiberius to the Antonines: a history of the Roman Empire AD 14-192, 1974
- William M. Ramsay, The Cities and Bishoprics of Phyrgia: Being an Essay of the Local History of Phrygia from the Earliest Times to the Turkish Conquest Volume One, Part One, 2004
- Marcus Aurelius, Meditations

Political offices
Preceded by Publius Cornelius Anullinus, and Marcus Aufidius Fronto	Consul of the Roman Empire; 200 with Gaius Aufidius Victorinus	Succeeded by Lucius Annius Fabianus, and Marcus Nonius Arrius Mucianus
