= Hedius =

Hedius is a name. Notable people with the name include:

- Hedius Lollianus Terentius Gentianus (fl. 3rd century AD), Roman politician
- Lucius Hedius Rufus Lollianus Avitus (consul 114), Roman senator
- Lucius Hedius Rufus Lollianus Avitus (consul 144) (fl. 2nd century), Roman senator
- Quintus Hedius Lollianus Plautius Avitus (fl. late 2nd to early 3rd century AD), Roman military officer
- Quintus Hedius Rufus Lollianus Gentianus (fl. 2nd century), Roman military officer
