= Gentianus =

Gentianus may refer to:

== People ==
- Decimus Terentius Gentianus, Roman senator
- Hedius Lollianus Terentius Gentianus (fl. 3rd century AD), Roman politician
- Quintus Hedius Rufus Lollianus Gentianus (fl. 2nd century), Roman military officer

== Other uses ==
- Ceyx gentianus, species of bird
