= Annia Faustina =

Early 3rd century Roman noblewoman and Augusta

Annia Aurelia Faustina
- Augusta
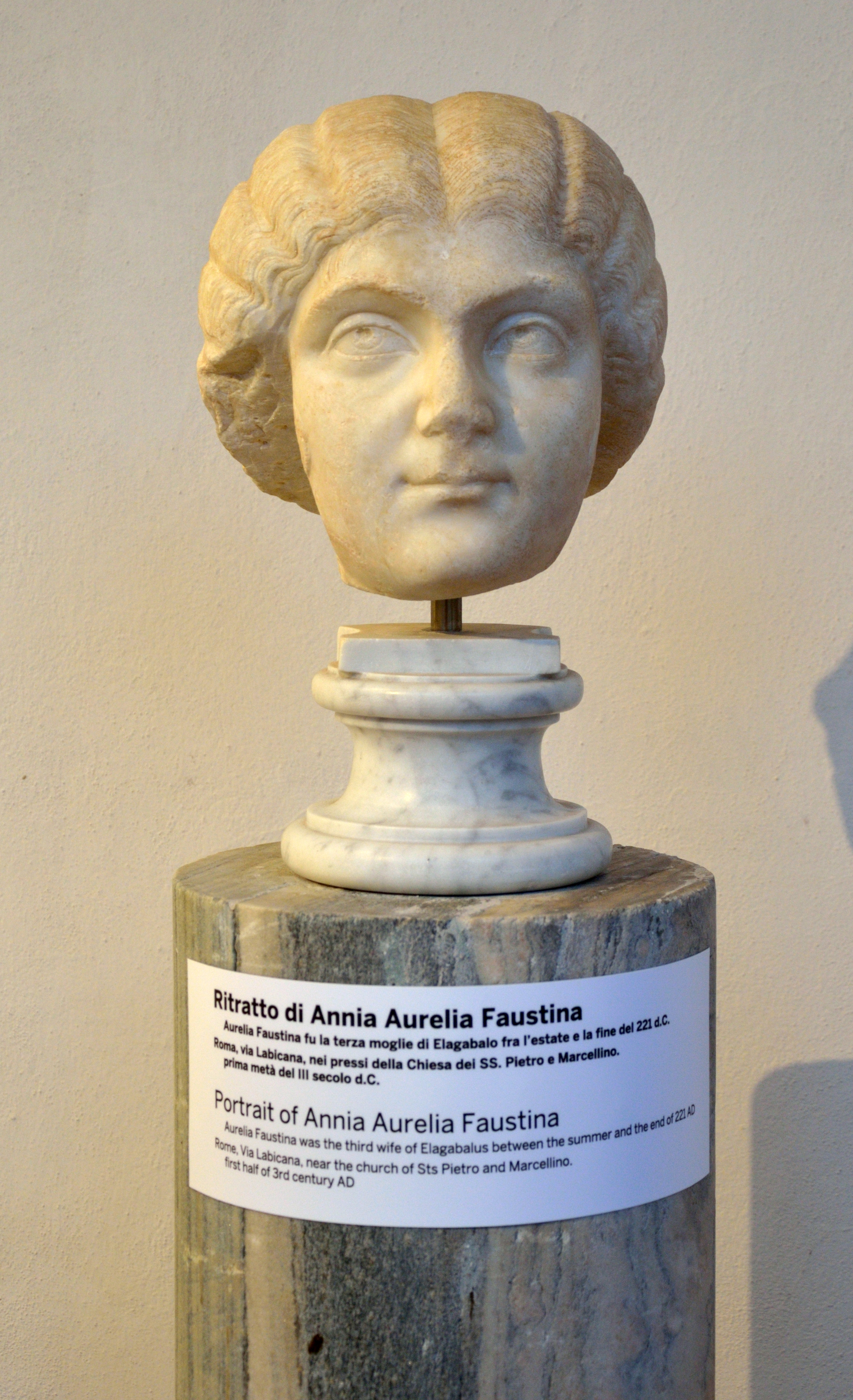
- Portrait of Annia Aurelia Faustina

Roman empress
- Tenure: AD 221
- Spouse: Pomponius Bassus; Elagabalus
- Issue: Pomponia Ummidia; Pomponius Bassus (consul 259)
Names
- Annia Aurelia Faustina
Regnal name
- Annia Aurelia Faustina Augusta
- Father: Tiberius Claudius Severus Proculus
- Mother: Annia Faustina

Annia Aurelia Faustina (fl. c. 201 – c. 222 CE) was an Anatolian Roman noblewoman. She was briefly married to the Roman emperor Elagabalus in 221 CE and thus was a Roman empress. She was Elagabalus' third wife.

== Ancestry and family ==
Faustina was of noble descent, the daughter and only child of the wealthy heiress Annia Faustina and the Roman Senator, consul Tiberius Claudius Severus Proculus. Her parents were maternal second-cousins.

Her paternal grandparents were the Pontian Greek Roman Senator and Peripatetic Philosopher, Gnaeus Claudius Severus and his second wife, the Roman Princess Annia Galeria Aurelia Faustina. Her maternal grandparents were wealthy Roman heiress Ummidia Cornificia Faustina and a Roman senator whose name is unknown. Her paternal half-uncle was Marcus Claudius Ummidius Quadratus, who had been adopted by the Roman Consul Marcus Ummidius Quadratus Annianus, the nephew of the Roman Emperor Marcus Aurelius. She was a Roman citizen of Pontic Greek and Italian ancestry.

Her paternal great-grandparents were the Roman emperor Marcus Aurelius; Roman empress Faustina the Younger; the Roman senator, philosopher Gnaeus Claudius Severus Arabianus and his wife, whose name is unknown. Her maternal great-grandparents were Marcus Aurelius’ sister, the noblewoman Annia Cornificia Faustina and Gaius Ummidius Quadratus Annianus Verus, a Roman Senator who served as a suffect consul in 146. Thus she was a descendant of the former ruling Nerva–Antonine dynasty of the Roman Empire. Although by birth, Annia Aurelia Faustina was of the gens Claudia, she was not named after her father; instead she was named in honor of her parents' relations to the gens Aurelia, the gens Annia and the Nerva–Antonine dynasty.

== Early life ==
Annia Aurelia Faustina was born and raised on her mother's estate in Pisidia, one of a number in that area called the "Cyllanian Estates". These estates were very large properties, established from the time of the dictator of the Roman Republic, Lucius Cornelius Sulla (c. 138-78 BC).

About 216, her father may have made a political alliance with a Roman Senator who was a member of the gens Pomponia that resulted in her marrying Pomponius Bassus.

Upon her marriage, they settled at her Pisidian estates. Pomponius treated Annia well and they both lived in domestic tranquility. She bore at least two known children during her marriage: a daughter, Pomponia Ummidia (born 219), and a son, Pomponius Bassus (born 220).

By 218, her parents had died and Annia inherited her mother's estate and their fortune, becoming a very wealthy heiress. On the site of the estate inscriptions have survived proclaiming her inheritance of the property from her parents and that she was its owner.

== Second marriage to Elagabalus ==
In the year 221, Roman Emperor Elagabalus was induced to end his highly controversial and politically damaging marriage to the Vestal Virgin Aquilia Severa by high-ranking courtiers and senior camp generals, led by his grandmother Julia Maesa. In its place he was advised to marry Annia Aurelia Faustina, to secure an alliance with the powerful clan represented by her blood connections to Marcus Aurelius (he was her great-grandfather) and the prior Nerva–Antonine dynasty. Annia Aurelia Faustina was recently widowed as her husband, Pomponius Bassus, had been executed for subversion and treason. The senatorial Roman ruling class was more receptive of this imperial marriage than the previous one.

Annia became Empress, and it seemed for a time that the Nerva–Antonine dynasty rule had returned to Rome. Elagabalus gave her the title of Augusta. Supporters of Elagabalus had hoped that Annia, the mother of two small children, would bear him a natural heir; however, they had no children. In the end of 221, Elagabalus divorced Annia and remarried Julia Aquilia Severa. Due to the brevity of the marriage, there are no surviving sources describing Annia Aurelia Faustina's rule as a Roman empress.

== Life after Elagabalus ==
When her marriage to Elagabalus ended, Annia Aurelia Faustina returned with her children to the Pisidian estate. She spent the final years of her life there. When she died, her daughter Pomponia Ummidia inherited the estate, and her descendants had become various distinguished nobles and politicians in Roman Society.

== Severan dynasty family tree ==
Severan family tree

Septimius Macer
Gaius Claudius Septimius Aper | Fulvius Pius | Lucius Septimius Severus
Publius Septimius Aper | Gaius Septimius Aper | Fulvia Pia | Publius Septimius Geta | Septimia Polla | Julius Bassianus
Septimius | Publius Septimius Geta | Septimia Octavilla | Paccia Marciana (1) | Septimius Severus (r. 193–211) | Julia Domna (2) | Julia Maesa | Gaius Julius Avitus Alexianus
Gaius Septimius Severus Aper | Fulvia Plautilla | Caracalla (r. 197–217) | Geta (r. 209–211) | Julia Soaemias | Sextus Varius Marcellus | Julia Avita Mamaea | Unknown (2)
Julia Cornelia Paula (1) | Aquilia Severa (2 and 4) | Elagabalus (r. 218–222) | Annia Faustina (3) | Sallustia Orbiana | Severus Alexander (r. 222–235)

- (1) = 1st spouse
- (2) = 2nd spouse
- (3) = 3rd spouse
- (4) = 4th spouse
- Dark green indicates an emperor of the Severan dynasty

Notes:

Except where otherwise noted, the notes below indicate that an individual's parentage is as shown in the above family tree.

Bibliography:

- Birley, Anthony R. (1999). Septimius Severus: The African Emperor. London: Routledge. ISBN 0415165911.
- Gibbon, Edward; Smith, William (1889). The Student's Gibbon: The Decline and Fall of the Roman Empire. London: Murray. OCLC 993285639.

== Sources ==
- Descriptive Catalogue of a Cabinet of Roman Imperial Large-brass Medals; by William Henry Smyth, 1834
- Septimius Severus: the African emperor; by Anthony Richard Birley; 2nd ed. Routledge, 1999
- Marcus Aurelius; by Anthony Richard Birley, Routledge, 2000
- The Cities and Bishoprics of Phyrgia: being an Essay of the Local History of Phrygia from the Earliest Times to the Turkish Conquest; Volume One, Part One; by William M. Ramsay, 2004
- Smith, William, Dictionary of Greek and Roman Biography and Mythology, v. 2, pp. 141, 1870, ancientlibrary.com via archive.org. Accessed 2012–5–29.
- Smith, William, Dictionary of Greek and Roman Biography and Mythology, v. 1, p. 473, 1870, ancientlibrary.com via archive.org. Accessed 2012–5–29.
- Annia Faustina, Forum Ancient Coins

Royal titles
| Preceded by Aquilia Severa | Empress of Rome; 221 | Succeeded by Aquilia Severa |
