= Pompeiopolis (disambiguation) =

Pompeiopolis was a city in ancient Paphlagonia, now in Turkey.

Pompeiopolis (Ancient Greek: Πομπηϊούπολις) may also refer to:

- Pompeiopolis in Cilicia, now in Turkey
- Pompeiopolis in Hispania, now in Spain
- Pompeiopolis in Pontus, a former name of Samsun, Turkey
