= Titus Pomponius Proculus Vitrasius Pollio =

2nd century Roman senator, consul and governor

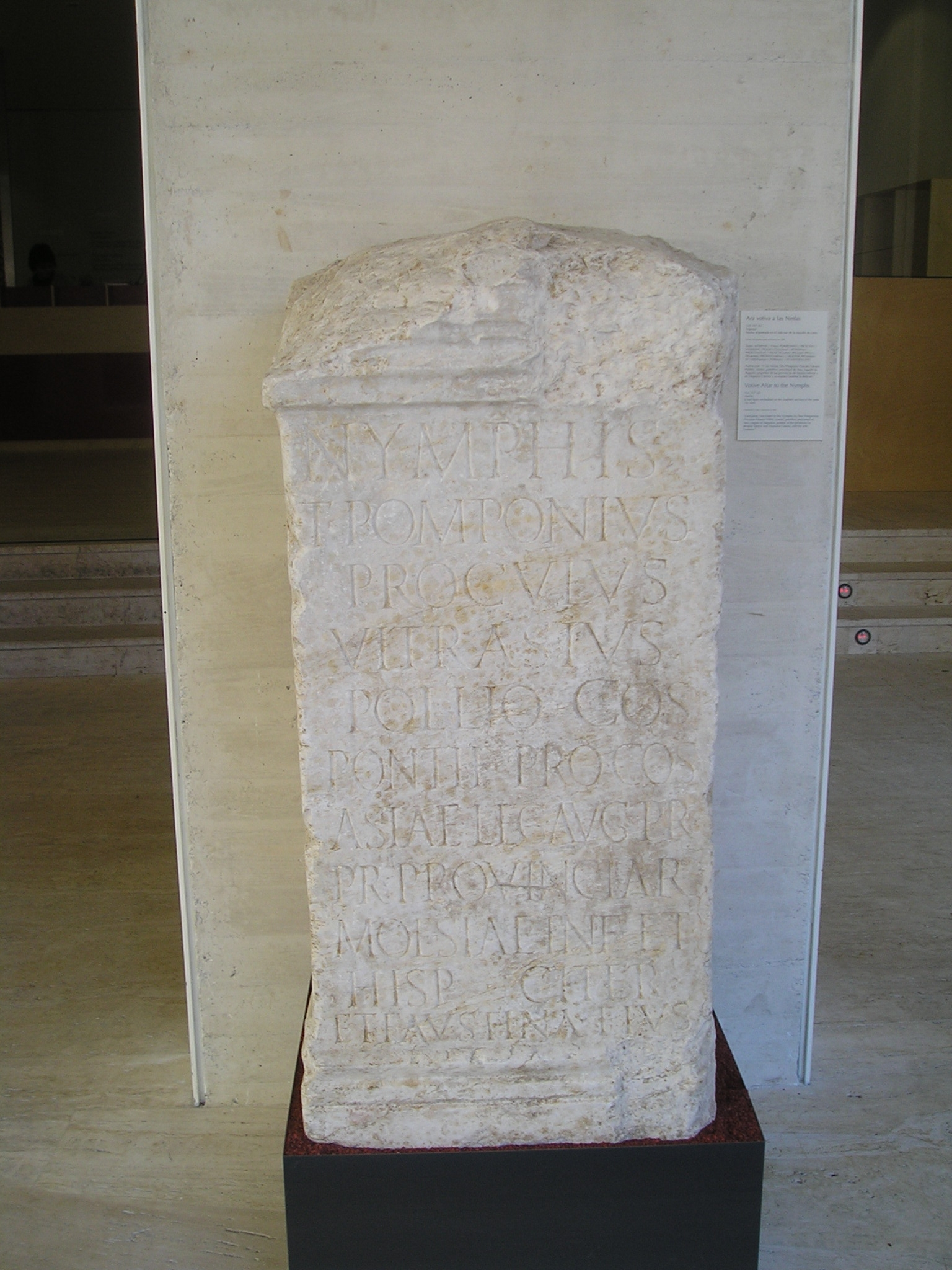
Inscription from Leondedicated to Pollio.

Titus Pomponius Proculus Vitrasius Pollio (died before 180) was a Roman senator, who held several imperial appointments during the reign of Marcus Aurelius. He was suffect consul in an undetermined nundinium around 151; he was a consul ordinarius in the year 176 with Marcus Flavius Aper as his colleague.

== Life ==
Vitrasius Pollio was born into a family of Patrician rank. Although the name of his mother is unknown, his father is Titus Vitrasius Pollio, consul around 137 in the reign of Hadrian. The older Vitrasius Pollio 's paternal grandfather was Gaius Vitrasius Pollio, who served as a Procurator of Egypt under Claudius (41-54) and whose father of the same name was also procurator of Egypt during the reign of Tiberius.

Two inscriptions, one from Rome, the other from Leon, provides us the details of his cursus honorum. Vitrasius Pollio's career began in his teens as one of the tresviri monetalis, the most prestigious of the four boards that comprise the vigintiviri; assignment to this board was usually allocated to patricians or favored individuals. His next office was as a quaestor, and upon completion of this traditional Republican magistracy Pollio would be enrolled in the Senate. As a patrician, Vitrasius Pollio was ineligible to hold the office of plebeian tribune, and was excused from serving as an aedile, so his next office was the traditional Republican magistracy of praetor. At this point, he acceded to the suffect consulship almost automatically after reaching his thirty-second or thirty-third birthday. By this point in his life Pollio had been admitted to the sodales Antoniniani.

Upon stepping down from the consulate, Vitrasius Pollio received a series of imperial appointments. First was curator aquarum, or overseer of the aqueducts of Rome. Next he served as a legatus or governor of Moesia Inferior; Géza Alföldy dates his tenure from around 156 to 159. After a space of a few years, he was appointed governor of Hispania Tarraconensis; Alföldy dates his tenure there from around 164 to 167. Then the sortition awarded him the proconsular governorship of Asia for the term 167/168. About this time, Pollio became a comes Augustorum, and accompanied the emperor Lucius Verus in the military campaigns against the Germans and Sarmatians, continuing after the emperor's death in 169, and earning dona militaria. He returned from the wars to open the year 176 at Rome with his second consulate.

Due to his outstanding military service, Vitrasius Pollio was awarded two statues in his honor. One statue of him depicts him in military clothing and was erected at Trajan's Forum. The second statue portrays him in civilian clothing and was erected at the Temple of Antoninus and Faustina. Vitrasius Pollio was deputy to Lucius Verus’ co-Emperor Marcus Aurelius in the Marcomannic Wars.

== Family ==
Pollio married a noblewoman called Annia Fundania Faustina, a member of the ruling Nerva–Antonine dynasty, whose paternal cousins were Marcus Aurelius and the Empress Faustina the Younger. Fundania Faustina bore him two children: Titus Fundanius Vitrasius Pollio, whom Commodus had executed in 182 because of his involvement in a conspiracy against the Emperor, and a daughter, Vitrasia Faustina.

Political offices
Preceded by Pertinax, and Didius Julianus	Consul of the Roman Empire; 176 with Marcus Flavius Aper II	Succeeded by Commodus, and Marcus Peducaeus Plautius Quintillus
