= Gaius Fundanius Fundulus =

Roman consul 243 BC

Gaius Fundanius Fundulus was a Roman politician of gens Fundania in the third century BC.

== Career ==
In 248 BC, Fundulus, as Tribune of the Plebs, accused Publius Claudius Pulcher of treason because of the defeat at the Battle of Drepana and the killing of the sacred chickens. Claudius Pulcher was condemned, and committed suicide shortly after. In 246 BC, while serving as Aedile, Fundulus fined Claudia, sister of Claudius Pulcher, for insulting the plebeians.

In 243 BC, he was elected consul together with Gaius Sulpicius Gallus. The consuls successfully fought in Sicily against Hamilcar Barca during the First Punic War.
