= Claudia (sister of Publius Claudius Pulcher) =

- Years active: 3rd-century BCE
- Known for: First woman to be convicted of treason in the Roman Republic
- Criminal charges: crimen maiestatis, damaging the majesty of the Roman people
- Criminal penalty: Fined 25,000 aes grave
- Parent: Appius Claudius Caecus
- Relatives: Appius Claudius Russus (brother); Tiberius Claudius Nero (brother); Publius Claudius Pulcher (brother); Gaius Claudius Centho (brother)
- Family: Claudia gens

Claudia was a Roman woman accused and convicted of treason, for which she was forced to pay a fine, the first woman convicted of treason in the Roman Republic. This incident is recounted in four separate Roman sources—those of Valerius Maximus, Livy, Suetonius, and Aulus Gellius. All sources agree that she was the sister of the consul Publius Claudius Pulcher, who had previously suffered a catastrophic defeat at the Battle of Drepana, leading to much loss of life on the part of the Romans. Suetonius records that, whilst her carriage ("carpento") was slowly passing through a mass of people, she expressed a wish that her brother should come to life so he could lose another fleet, thereby reducing the size of the crowds in Rome. Livy states that Claudia was returning from the games ("a ludis") and being "jostled by the crowd" ("cum turba premeretur") when she supposedly uttered the exact words "O that my brother were alive to command another fleet!" ("Utinam frater meus viveret; iterum classem duceret"). The account from Valerius Maximus corroborates many of the details mentioned by Livy—Maximus also records that she was returning home from the games ("a ludis domum rediens") and was being jostled by the crowd ("turba elideretur").

Aulus Gellius, in his version of the story, states that she had been leaving the games when she was jostled by the crowds of people, and—after having escaped from that situation—complained of how poorly she was handled ("cum se male habitam doleret"), before stating "What, pray, would have become of me, and how much more should I have been crowded and pressed upon, had not my brother Publius Claudius lost his fleet in the sea-fight and with it a vast number of citizens? Surely I should have lost my life, overwhelmed by a still greater mass of people." Afterwards, she then proclaimed her wish that her "brother might come to life again, take another fleet to Sicily, and destroy that crowd which has just knocked poor me about.” According to Gellius, due to these "wicked and impolite words" ("verba tam inproba ac tam incivilia"), the Plebeian aediles Gaius Fundanius and Tiberius Sempronius fined her 25,000 pounds of aes grave. Moreover, Gellius claims that another, now lost source—the commentary On Public Trials by Ateius Capito—states that this event occurred specifically during the consulships of Fabius Licinus and Fabius Licinius and Otacilius Crassus (i.e. during the year 246 BCE). The money gathered from this fine may have helped pay for the construction of a temple to Libertas on the Aventine Hill, which—according to Livy—was partially financed by funds Sempronius had amassed from fines.

On account of her statement, she was put on trial for treason, which was—according to Suetonius—an unprecedented charge for a woman. Suetonius states that she underwent a "trial of majesty" ("iudicium maiestatis"), indicating that her exact crime was that of a crimen maiestatis ("crime of majesty")—the act of damaging the grandeur of the Roman people. Claudia was the first person accused of this specific crime, which later went on to become the standard charge for treason under the Empire. Suetonius further specifies that the trial occurred "amongst the people ("apud populum"), presumably indicating that the trial occurred in the comitia tributa. If Aulus Gellius's account is accurate, and the case really was prosecuted by aediles, then this trial would stand amongst the earliest known instances of aediles prosecuting a major trial, perhaps even the earliest, though it was possibly preceded by the accusations of the ex-consul Gaius Veturius Cicurinus by Lucius Alienus.
