= Titus Vitrasius Pollio (consul 137) =

Titus Vitrasius Pollio was a Roman senator, who held a number of offices in the imperial service. He was suffect consul around the year 137.

The cursus honorum of Pollio is known from diverse sources. The tombstone of a soldier of Legio VII Gemina, which mentions Pollio as legatus legionis or commander of the unit, also mentions the consul Marcus Junius Homullus; since Homullus' nundinium as suffect consul has been dated to 128, Pollio's commission in the legion either was in that year or after. Pollio is also known to have been governor of the imperial province of Gallia Lugdunensis at the end of Hadrian's reign, although he could have held that office before or after his command of Legio VII.

One definite date in Pollio's life comes after his consulate, when the sortition awarded him the proconsular governorship of Asia, which he held for the term 151/152. During his tenure, he had to intervene in a protracted legal suit between the sophist Aelius Aristides and the inhabitants of Smyrna who had been nominating him to various civic posts that Prof. G.W. Bowersock described as "laden with honor, time-consuming, and expensive." The specific civic honor the Smyrnans wanted Aristides to accept was eklogeus, who was responsible for arrears in taxes; the assistant to the governor of Asia had confirmed Aristides' appointment. Aristides responded by appealing to Pollio, who saw that his assistant altered his confirmation, thus allowing Aristides to once again avoid his civic responsibilities.

Pollio must have married, although we are ignorant of his wife's name, for Titus Pomponius Proculus Vitrasius Pollio, consul in 176, is identified as his son.
