= Empress Fausta =

Empress Fausta may refer to:

- Flavia Maxima Fausta (289–326), wife of Constantine the Great, Roman emperor
- Fausta (wife of Constans II) (c. 630–after 668), Byzantine empress

== See also ==
- Empress Faustina (disambiguation)
