= Vitrasia Faustina =

Vitrasia Faustina (died 182 or 183 CE) was a noble Roman woman who lived in the 2nd century during the Roman Empire.

== Life ==
Vitrasia was the daughter of Annia Fundania Faustina and the Roman Senator Titus Pomponius Proculus Vitrasius Pollio, consul II in 176. Her brother was Titus Fundanius Vitrasius Pollio. Through her maternal grandfather, Marcus Annius Libo, consul in 128, she was a distant relative to the ruling Nerva–Antonine dynasty of the Roman Empire. Vitrasia was born and raised in Rome.

Through inheritances Vitrasia became a very wealthy heiress and had moved to Cales in Campania. Due to her influence, status and connections, Vitrasia became a public benefactor and a prominent citizen of Cales. Through her wealth, Vitrasia paid for the construction or repair of the civic Temple of Magna Dea or the Great Mother.

It is uncertain if Vitrasia had ever married or had children. In 182 or 183, she may have been involved in one of numerous conspiracies against her unstable maternal second cousin the Roman Emperor Commodus (who ruled 180–192). In 182, she was executed on the orders of Commodus.

== Sources ==
- Anthony Birley, Septimius Severus: the African emperor, 2nd edition (1999)
- Albino Garzetti, From Tiberius to the Antonines: a history of the Roman Empire AD 14-192 (1974)
- Eric R. Varner, Mutilation and transformation: damnatio memoriae and Roman imperial portraiture, (2004)
- http://www.mjengh.com/femina_habilis_8457.htm
