= Pomponius Bassus (consul 211) =

Roman senator and consul (175–221)

Pomponius Bassus (175 – 221) was a Roman senator active during the reigns of Septimius Severus, Caracalla, and Geta.

== Life ==
The father of Pomponius Bassus was probably Gaius Pomponius Bassus Terentianus (c. 155-after 193), who served as a suffect consul around 193; the name of his mother is unknown.

Bassus was ordinary consul in 211. Between 212 and 217 Bassus served as a legatus of Inferior or Superior Moesia and possibly as Roman governor of Mysia.

Sometime between 216 and 218, he married the wealthy Annia Aurelia Faustina, the great-granddaughter of Marcus Aurelius and Faustina the Younger. When Bassus married Faustina, they moved to Faustina's large estate in Pisidia. Their marriage was a happy one. There are inscriptions at the Pisidian estate attesting both to their marriage and joint ownership of the estate. Faustina bore Bassus at least two children: a daughter called Pomponia Ummidia (born 219) and a son, Pomponius Bassus (born 220).

Before June 221, Emperor Elagabalus became attracted to Faustina's charm, beauty, and imperial descent. Elagabalus ordered the Senate to put Bassus to death under some frivolous pretext in order to have her. After Bassus' execution, Elagabalus forbade Faustina to mourn him.

In July 221, Elagabalus took Faustina as his third wife, but he divorced her by the end of the year.

== Sources ==
- Descriptive catalogue of a cabinet of Roman imperial large-brass medals By William Henry Smyth 1834
- The Cities and Bishoprics of Phrygia: Being an Essay of the Local History of Phrygia from the Earliest Times to the Turkish Conquest Volume One, Part One - By William M. Ramsay 2004
- Article title^{[usurped]}

Political offices
Preceded by Manius Acilius Faustinus, and Aulus Triarius Rufinus	Consul of the Roman Empire; 211 with Hedius Lollianus Terentius Gentianus	Succeeded by Gaius Julius Asper, and Gaius Julius Camilius Asper
