= Gnaeus Claudius Severus (consul 167) =

2nd century Roman senator, consul and philosopher

Gnaeus Claudius Severus was a Roman senator and philosopher who lived in the Roman Empire during the 2nd century AD.

== Life ==
Severus was the son of the senator and philosopher Gnaeus Claudius Severus Arabianus by a mother whose name is unknown. Severus was of Pontian Greek descent. He was born and raised in Pompeiopolis, a city in the Roman province of Galatia. His paternal grandfather, Gaius Claudius Severus, was a consul and the first Roman governor of Arabia Petraea in the reign of the Emperor Trajan, 98–117.

Like his father, Severus was a follower of peripatetic philosophy. Although Severus held no major political influence, he was considered as an influential figure in the intellectual and philosophical circles in Rome. Like his father, Severus was a friend and had a great influence on the Emperor Marcus Aurelius (161-180). It was probably Severus that introduced Marcus Aurelius to the rhetorician Cornelianus and recommended Galen to him as his personal physician. Severus and his father accompanied Marcus Aurelius on a philosophical visit to Athens in 176.

Severus served as a suffect consul in 167 and an ordinary consul in 173. In the year of his second consulship, Severus became a patron and was made an honorary citizen of Pompeiopolis. That same year, an honorific inscription, which survives to this day on a statue base, was dedicated to Severus in his birth city:

For the good fortune of Gnaeus Claudius Severus who was consul twice, pontifex, son-in-law of the Emperor Caesar Marcus Aurelius Antoninus Augustus, patron of the city, the metropolis Pompeiopolis of the province of Paphlagonia put this up in the 178th year of the province through the work of Publius Domitius Augureinus Clodius Kalbeinus the chief archon.

== Wives and children ==
Severus married twice:

- A noblewoman, name unknown, with whom he had a son:
  - Marcus Claudius Ummidius Quadratus Annianus Verus. His birth name other than Claudius is unknown and he is known by his adopted name. Claudius was adopted by the other ordinary consul of 167, Marcus Ummidius Quadratus Annianus Verus, who was a cousin and a maternal nephew of Marcus Aurelius. In 182, he was involved in a failed plot to kill the Emperor Commodus (180-192), which led to the former's execution.
- After 159 he married Annia Galeria Aurelia Faustina, the second daughter and fifth child born to Marcus Aurelius and Faustina the Younger. They had a son called:
  - Tiberius Claudius Severus Proculus, who served as an ordinary consul in 200 and married his maternal second cousin Annia Faustina.

== Sources ==
- Anthony Richard Birley, Marcus Aurelius London: Routledge, 2000
- Anthony Richard Birley, Septimius Severus: the African emperor, second edition (1999)
- Albino Garzetti, From Tiberius to the Antonines: a history of the Roman Empire AD 14-192 (1974)
- Alan K. Bowman, Peter Garnsey, Dominic Rathbone, The Cambridge ancient history: The High Empire, A.D. 70-192, vol. 11, second edition (2000)
- William M. Ramsay, The Cities and Bishoprics of Phyrgia: Being an Essay of the Local History of Phrygia from the Earliest Times to the Turkish Conquest, Volume One, Part One (2004)
- https://www.livius.org/fa-fn/faustina/faustina_ii.html
- http://thecorner.wordpress.com/2006/06/21/chapter-two-septimius-and-the-cursus-honorum/
- Marcus Aurelius, Meditations

Political offices
Preceded by Servius Calpurnius Scipio Orfitus, and Sextus Quintilius Maximus	Consul of the Roman Empire; 173 with Claudius Pompeianus II	Succeeded by Lucius Aurelius Gallus, and Quintus Volusius Flaccus Cornelianus
