= Annia Faustina (daughter of Ummidia Cornificia Faustina) =

Late 2nd/early 3rd century Roman noblewoman

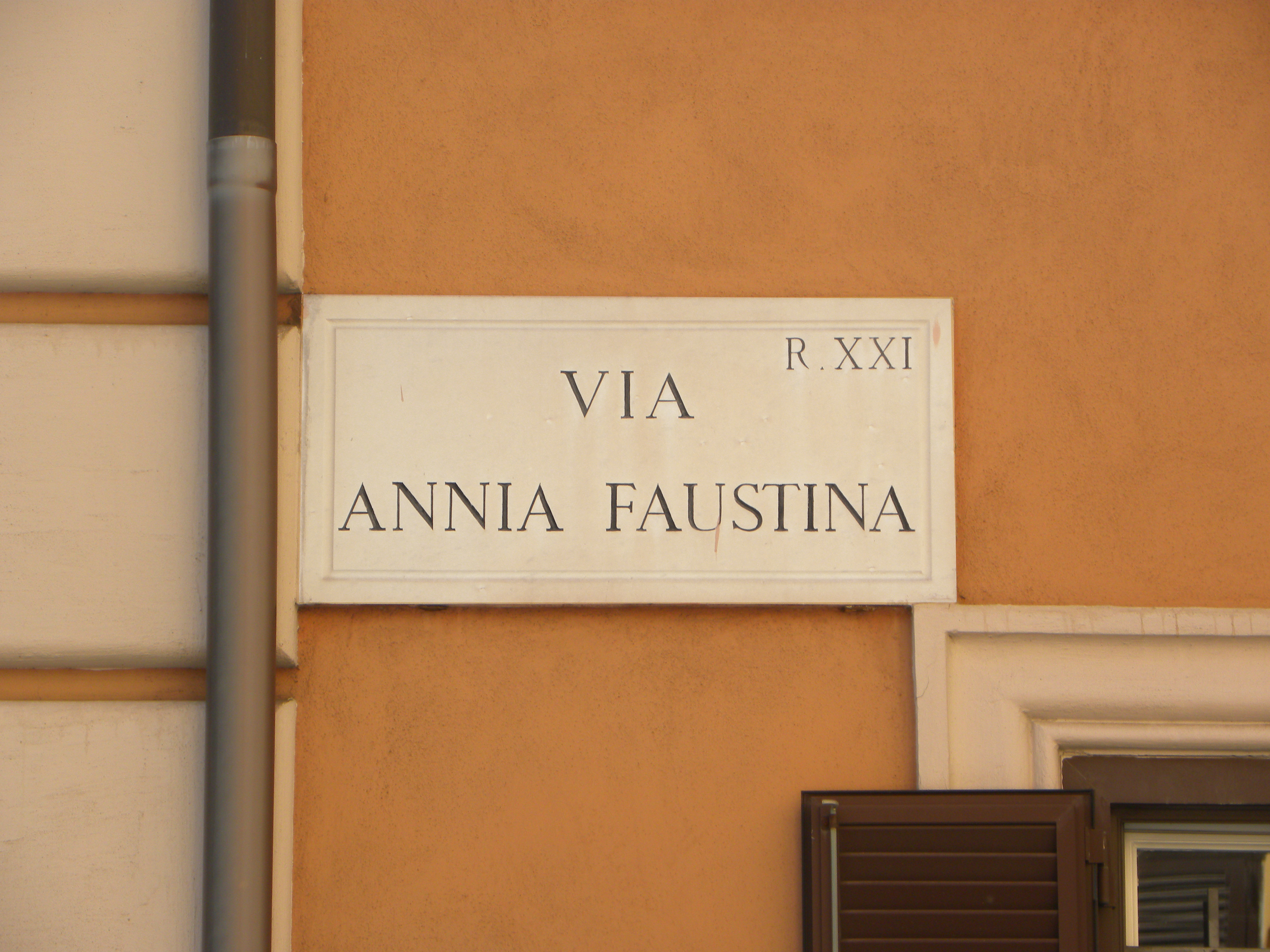
Plaque Via Annia Faustina, Rome

Annia Faustina (c. 165-by 218) was a noblewoman of Anatolian Roman descent and a wealthy heiress who lived in the Roman Empire. She was a mother-in-law of the emperor Elagabalus.

== Biography ==
Annia Faustina was the daughter and only child of the wealthy Roman heiress Ummidia Cornificia Faustina by an unknown Roman Senator. The full name of Annia Faustina is unknown. It appears she was named in honor of her mother and her late maternal grandmother, the noblewoman Annia Cornificia Faustina. The maternal grandmother of Annia Faustina was the sister of the Roman Emperor Marcus Aurelius and her maternal grandfather was Gaius Ummidius Quadratus Annianus Verus a Roman Senator who served as a suffect consul in 146. She was the great niece of Marcus Aurelius and through her mother, Annia Faustina was a distant relative of the ruling Nerva–Antonine dynasty of the Roman Empire. She is not mentioned in any ancient Roman historical sources. Annia Faustina has been only known through surviving inscriptions about her and her family found in Anatolia.

Annia Faustina was born and raised in her mother's estate in Pisidia. The estate she was born and raised in is one of a number of estates in Pisidia called the Cyllanian Estates. These estates were very large properties and were around from the time of the Roman Dictator of the Roman Republic, Lucius Cornelius Sulla (c. 138 BC-78 BC). There are surviving inscriptions at the estate recording Ummidia Cornificia Faustina with her daughter Annia Faustina.

The mother of Annia Faustina in 182 was involved in a failed plot to kill her first maternal cousin the Roman Emperor Commodus. When the plot was revealed, her mother was banished to the Italian island of Capri. Later in 182, Commodus sent a centurion to execute her mother.

After the death of her mother, Annia Faustina inherited the estate and her mother's fortune. Before 200, she had a posthumous honorific inscription dedicated to late mother at the estate.

There is an inscription dated about 200, stating that Annia Faustina was the owner of the estate. After 200, Annia Faustina married her maternal second cousin the Roman Senator and Consul Tiberius Claudius Severus Proculus, who was a grandson of Marcus Aurelius and Faustina the Younger. There is an inscription dated in 207, stating that the owners of the estate were Annia Faustina and Tiberius Claudius Severus Proculus.

Around 201, Annia Faustina bore Severus Proculus a daughter called Annia Aurelia Faustina. When their child was born, Severus Proculus did not name the child after himself. It appears that Annia Faustina and Severus Proculus named their daughter in honor of their ancestry and relations from the gens Aurelia, the gens Annia and the Nerva–Antonine dynasty. Their daughter was born and raised on the Pisidian Estate. It appears that Annia Faustina had no more children with Severus Proculus.

About 216, Severus Proculus may have made a political alliance with a Roman Senator who was a member of the Pomponia gens. In the result, their daughter married her first husband, the Roman Politician Pomponius Bassus. Later in 221 Annia Aurelia Faustina, would become a brief Roman Empress and marry the Roman Emperor Elagabalus (218-222) as her second husband. Elagabalus’ marriage with Annia Aurelia Faustina would have been his third marriage.

When Annia Faustina and Severus Proculus died, Annia Aurelia Faustina inherited the estate and the fortunes of her parents. According to the inscriptions, Annia Faustina seems to have been a person of a virtuous character who had principle and prudence. This personality that Annia Faustina had, was evident with her ancestors from the Nerva–Antonine dynasty.

== See also ==
- List of Roman women

== Sources ==
- Marcus Aurelius, by Anthony Richard Birley, Routledge, 2000
- Septimius Severus: the African emperor, by Anthony Richard Birley Edition: 2 - 1999
- The Cities and Bishoprics of Phyrgia: Being an Essay of the Local History of Phrygia from the Earliest Times to the Turkish Conquest Volume One, Part One - By William M. Ramsay 2004
- Descriptive catalogue of a cabinet of Roman imperial large-brass medals By William Henry Smyth 1834
