= Annia Fundania Faustina =

Roman noblewoman (died 192)

Annia Fundania Faustina (died 192 CE) was a noble Roman woman who lived in the Roman Empire during the 2nd century AD. She was the paternal cousin of Roman Emperor Marcus Aurelius and his sister Annia Cornificia Faustina.

== Life ==
Fundania Faustina was the daughter of the Roman consul Marcus Annius Libo and wife Fundania. Her brother was the younger Marcus Annius Libo who served as governor of Syria in 162. Fundania Faustina's maternal grandparents are inferred to be Lucius Fundanius Lamia Aelianus and his unknown wife; however her paternal grandparents are the Roman consul Marcus Annius Verus and Rupilia Faustina. She was born and raised in Rome.

Through her paternal grandmother, she was related to the ruling Nerva–Antonine dynasty of the Roman Empire. Her paternal aunt was Empress Faustina the Elder (wife of Emperor Antoninus Pius and mother of Empress Faustina the Younger) and her paternal uncle was praetor Marcus Annius Verus (father of Emperor Marcus Aurelius, the paternal grandmother of Empress Lucilla and Emperor Commodus).

Fundania Faustina, married the Roman Politician Titus Pomponius Proculus Vitrasius Pollio. She had two children with him who were:

- Titus Fundanius Vitrasius Pollio; he was executed in 182 on the orders of Commodus on the charge of conspiracy against the emperor.
- Vitrasia Faustina

Before 180, her husband had died and Fundania Faustina never remarried. During the reign of her unstable paternal cousin Commodus (180-192), she decided to withdraw from public life and chose to live in retirement in Achaea. Before he was assassinated in 192, Commodus ordered Fundania Faustina's death and she was later executed in that year.

== Sources ==
- Septimius Severus: the African emperor, by Anthony Richard Birley Edition: 2 – 1999
- From Tiberius to the Antonines: a history of the Roman Empire AD 14-192, by Albino Garzetti, 1974
- Mutilation and transformation: damnatio memoriae and Roman imperial portraiture By Eric R. Varner 2004
