= Hedius Lollianus Terentius Gentianus =

Roman senator and consul in 211

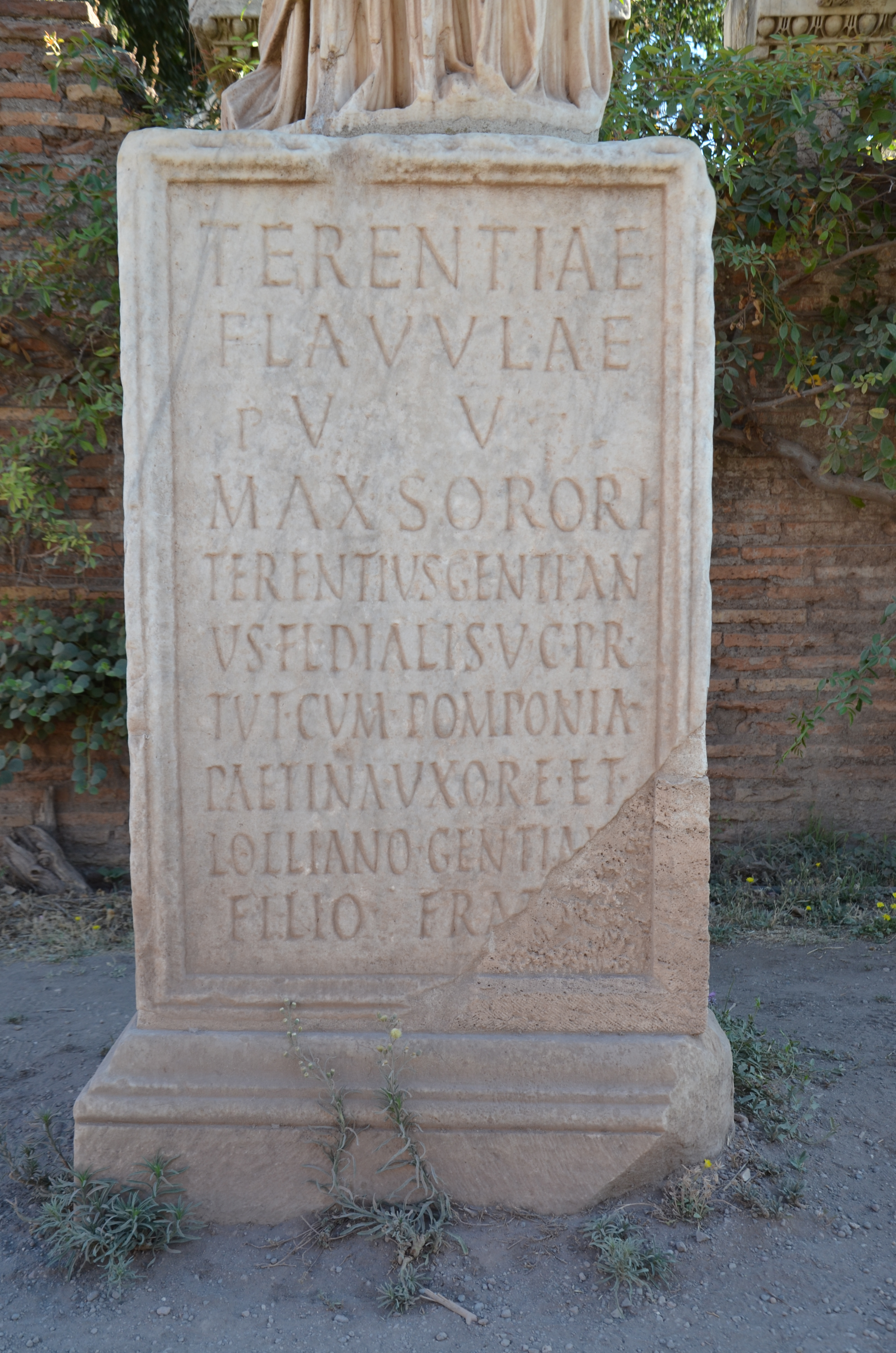
Inscription for statue of his sister Terentia Flavola, the chief Vestal

(Hedius Lollianus) Terentius Gentianus (fl. 3rd century AD) was a Roman politician who was appointed consul in AD 211 and also served as High Priest of Jupiter.

== Biography ==
Terentius Gentianus was the son of Quintus Hedius Rufus Lollianus Gentianus who had been suffect consul in around AD 186/8. In AD 200, Terentius Gentianus was elected as Praetor tutelaris. Then in AD 211, he was appointed consul ordinarius alongside Pomponius Bassus. He put up a statue in Rome for his sister Terentia Flavola, Chief Vestal. In the inscription he is mentioned as the Flamen Dialis, which makes him the latest-attested holder of that office.

Terentius Gentianus was married to Pomponia Paetina, who was possibly related to his colleague of 211.

Political offices
Preceded by Manius Acilius Faustinus, and Aulus Triarius Rufinus	Consul of the Roman Empire; 211 with Pomponius Bassus	Succeeded by Gaius Julius Asper II, and Gaius Julius Camilius Asper
