= Gaius Julius Asper =

Second-century Roman politician and senator

Gaius Julius Asper was a Roman politician and senator in the third century AD.

Asper came from the city of Attalia in Asia Minor. He was promoted to a high position in the Senate due to his learning and intellect. During the reign of Commodus, Asper served as suffect consul. In 204 AD, Asper was appointed as Proconsul of Africa. In 212 AD, he served as consul together with his son, Gaius Julius Camilius Asper. At the same time he was consul, Asper also was Urban Prefect of Rome.

However, in that same year, Asper fell out of favor and was exiled along with his son on the orders of Caracalla. Later, he was pardoned and appointed Proconsul of Asia in 217 AD, but the new emperor Macrinus revoked this appointment, citing Asper's old age and illness, installing Quintus Anicius Faustus in his stead.

Asper was a Priest of the Flamens and the Salii.
