= Gaius Pomponius Bassus Terentianus =

2nd century Roman military officer, senator and consul

Gaius Pomponius Bassus Terentianus (fl. 2nd century AD) was a Roman military officer and senator.

== Biography ==
Pomponius Bassus Terentianus was a member of the second century gens Pomponia by adoption and of gens Terentia by birth, as his cognomen Terentianus suggests. A successful imperial candidate for the post of quaestor provinciae early in his career, he was later appointed either curator rei publicae of Aquinum or Urvinum Mataurense. In around AD 185, Terentianus was possibly the Legatus and Iuridicus of Hispania Citerior.

In either 186 or 187, Terentianus was the proconsular governor of Lycia et Pamphylia. This was followed by a posting as Legatus Augusti pro praetore of Pannonia Inferior between 187 and 189. Then from around 190 to 192, Terentianus was a praefectus aerarii militaris (or official responsible for the military treasury) under the emperor Commodus. Finally, sometime around 193, he was appointed suffect consul, by one of the reigning emperors (Commodus, Pertinax, Didius Julianus or Septimius Severus).

It is possible that Terentianus was the Bassus who was reported as an amicus Severi (or friend of the emperor Septimius Severus). Less likely, he may also have been the Bassus who was Praefectus urbi of Rome for a few weeks during the reign of Didius Julianus. He was probably the father of Pomponius Bassus who was consul in 211.

== Sources ==
- Mennen, Inge, Power and Status in the Roman Empire, AD 193-284 (2011)

Political offices
Preceded by Uncertain	Consul suffectus of the Roman Empire around AD 193	Succeeded by Uncertain
