= Quintus Hedius Rufus Lollianus Gentianus =

- Occupations: Politician; senator
- Known for: Roman senator and suffect consul
- Office: Suffect Consul of the Roman Empire
- Term: 203 (with Marcus Annius Flavius Libo; nundinium)

Quintus Hedius Rufus Lollianus Gentianus (fl. 2nd century) was a Roman military officer and senator who was appointed consul suffectus in around AD 186–188.

== Life ==
Rufus Lollianus was a member of the gens Hedia Lolliana which probably originated from the region of Liguria, and which had achieved patrician status by the time that he began his career. He was the son of Lucius Hedius Rufus Lollianus Avitus, who was elected consul ordinarius in AD 144. He himself began in his teens as one of the tresviri monetalis, the most prestigious of the four boards that comprise the vigintiviri; assignment to this board was usually allocated to or favored individuals. This was followed by a commission as tribunus laticlavius in Legio VII Gemina, at the time stationed in Hispania Tarraconensis. A successful imperial candidate for both the offices of Quaestor and Praetor — further signs of imperial favor — he was eventually commissioned Legatus legionis of Legio XXII Primigenia, stationed at Moguntiacum, around the year AD 184. It is speculated that it was during this time that Rufus Lollianus formed a working relationship with the future emperor Septimius Severus, who was the governor of Gallia Lugdunensis.

He was appointed consul suffectus in around the years 186–188, after which Rufus Lollianus may have been the curator rei publicae Puteolanorum et Veliternorum. Possibly from AD 189–192, he was the Legatus Augusti pro praetore (or imperial governor) of Hispania Tarraconensis. Between AD 194 and 197, Rufus Lollianus was the Comes (or companion) to the emperors Septimius Severus and Caracalla on three occasions. It is speculated that he accompanied Septimius Severus as comes on his campaigns against Pescennius Niger, the first Parthian War of 194, and the war against Clodius Albinus.

From AD 197-198 Rufus Lollianus was appointed censitor of Gallia Lugdunensis, following which he may have been the censitor of Hispania Citerior, from 198 to 199. Finally, he was appointed the Proconsular governor of Asia, which he probably held in AD 201/2.

Rufus Lollianus was probably a patronus of the emperor Pertinax, who was mentioned in the Historia Augusta as having criticized Pertinax for breaking a promise.

== Family ==
Rufus Lollianus was married and had at least five children:

- Quintus Hedius Lollianus Plautius Avitus, consul ordinarius in AD 209.
- Hedius Lollianus Terentius Gentianus, consul ordinarius in AD 211.
- Hedia Terentia Flavola, the virgo vestalis maxima.
- Another daughter, who possibly married Lucius Egnatius Victor.
- Another son who probably died around AD 209/10.

== Sources ==
- Mennen, Inge, Power and Status in the Roman Empire, AD 193-284 (2011)

Political offices
Preceded by Uncertain	Consul suffectus of the Roman Empire around AD 186/188	Succeeded by Uncertain
