= Ummidia Cornificia Faustina =

Niece of the Roman Emperor Marcus Aurelius (141–182)

Ummidia Cornificia Faustina (AD 141–182) was a wealthy Roman noblewoman, an heiress and the niece of the Roman Emperor Marcus Aurelius.

== Family ==
Cornificia Faustina was the daughter of Marcus Aurelius’ sister, Annia Cornificia Faustina and a Roman Senator, Gaius Annianus Verus. Cornificia Faustina had descended from one of the leading families in Rome. She was born and raised in Rome. Through her mother, she was a member and a relative to the ruling Nerva–Antonine dynasty of the Roman Empire. Her brother Marcus Ummidius Quadratus Annianus served as one of the consuls in 167. Apart from her and her mother, Cornificia Faustina had another relative, who had the name Cornificia, her maternal cousin Annia Cornificia Faustina Minor.

== Life ==
Cornificia Faustina's mother had died sometime in 152–158. When her mother had died, Cornificia Faustina and her brother divided their mother's property that they inherited. Through the inheritances of their parents, Cornificia Faustina and her brother had become very wealthy.

From her mother, Cornificia Faustina had inherited a great estate located in Pisidia. This estate was one of a number of estates in Pisidia called the Cyllanian Estates. These estates were around from the time of the Roman Dictator of the Roman Republic, Lucius Cornelius Sulla (c. 138 BC-78 BC). The Cyllanian Estate properties were very large properties and her property inheritance was considered to be very large for the rank of Cornificia Faustina.

Little is mentioned in the Roman historical sources about Cornificia Faustina. What is known about her is mainly from the inscriptions, she has left behind in her Pisidian Estate. By 160, Cornificia Faustina had left Rome and had gone to live her estate in Pisidia. At that time, Cornificia Faustina had married an unknown Roman Senator by whom she had a daughter called Annia Faustina, who was born and raised there.

When Marcus Aurelius had died in 180, her maternal cousin Commodus succeeded Marcus Aurelius as Roman Emperor. Commodus’ sister, Lucilla was not happy living as a quiet, private citizen in Rome and became jealous of her brother and her sister-in-law because of all the attention that they received. Also she became very concerned due to the unstable behavior of her brother.

In 182, Lucilla, her daughter Plautia, her nephew-in-marriage and with the help of Quadratus Annianus, his adopted son and Cornificia Faustina had planned to assassinate Commodus and replace him with Lucilla and her second husband, the consul Tiberius Claudius Pompeianus Quintianus, as the new rulers of Rome. Cornificia Faustina, her brother Quadratus Annianus and his adopted son were involved in Lucilla's plot because the three may have had a dynastic dispute with Commodus.

Lucilla's plot to kill Commodus failed. When the conspiracy was revealed, the emperor ordered the deaths of Quadratus Annianus, his adopted son and Quintianus. Commodus may have confiscated her brother's property and fortune. Lucilla, her daughter and Cornificia Faustina were banished to the Italian island of Capri. Later that year, the emperor sent a centurion to Capri to execute the three women.

Shortly before her death, Cornificia Faustina had an inscription engraved at the estate. Annia Faustina inherited her mother's estate and fortune. Before 200, Annia Faustina had a posthumous honorific inscription dedicated to her late mother at the estate.

== Sources ==
- Marcus Aurelius, by Anthony Richard Birley, Routledge, 2000
- The Cities and Bishoprics of Phyrgia: Being an Essay of the Local History of Phrygia from the Earliest Times to the Turkish Conquest Volume One, Part One - By William M. Ramsay 2004
