= Pompeiopolis =

Roman city, today in Kastamonu Province, Turkey

- Πομπηιούπολις (Greek)
- Location within Turkey
- 41.517°N 34.213°E
- Location: Paphlagonia, Asia Minor, modern day Turkey
- Region: Kastamonu Province

Pompeiopolis (Greek: Πομπηιούπολις, city of Pompeius) was an important and rich Roman city located in Paphlagonia. It is 40 km north-east of Kastamonu in the Black Sea region of Turkey. It lies a short distance across the river from modern Taşköprü in the valley of the Gök River (Greek: Αμνίας, Amnías). The borders of Pompeiopolis reached the Küre mountains to the north, the Ilgaz mountains to the south, the Halys river to the east and the Pınarbaşı valley to the west.

The city is still being excavated revealng rich buildings.

== History ==
Pompeiopolis was one of the seven cities founded by the Roman general Pompey the Great along the fluvial plains of Iris, Halys and Amnias in 64/63 BC, when he conquered the Kingdom of Pontus and incorporated the region into the new Roman double province of Bithynia and Pontus. It is argued that Pompeiopolis was founded to take over the administrative function of the Hellenistic fortress of Pimolisa, located in Boyabat, which was abandoned and destroyed in the aftermath of the Mithridatic Wars.

It was later assigned by Mark Antony to the vassal princes of Paphlagonia, and in 6/5 BC was re-integrated into the Roman Empire and placed under the governor of the province of Galatia. During its peak in the 2nd century AD, the city was capital of the Roman province of Paphlagonia, as some inscriptions on stone and coins bear the title "Metropolis of Paphlagonia".

During the imperial era, several families from Pompeiopolis rose to imperial aristocracy, such as those of Gaius Claudius Severus (consul suffectus in AD 112), Gnaeus Claudius Severus Arabianus (consul in AD 146), Gnaeus Claudius Severus (consul in AD 173), and possibly Tiberius Claudius Subatianus Aquila (praefectus of Egypt in AD 206–211) and Tiberius Claudius Subatianus Proculus (governor of Numidia in AD 208–210). The city became richly endowed with ornate public and private buildings.

Being a bishopric since at least the early 4th century, Pompeiopolis received the title of autocephalous archdiocese at some time during the reign of Justinian I. Within the church province of Paphlagonia, Pompeiopolis always ranked immediately after Gangra, and above the other bishoprics. In the 10th/11th century, Pompeiopolis was a metropolitan see until the 14th century, when this diocese was suppressed by the invading Turks. Amongst the 14 known titular holders of the Christian diocese are: Philadelphus at the First Council of Nicaea, Severus of Constantinople, and Theodore of Constantinople. The bishopric of Pompeiopolis in Paphlagonia is included in the Catholic Church's list of titular sees. In the early 13th century, Pompeiopolis fell under Turkish rule and its name changed to Taşköprü (Stone Bridge). Byzantine Emperor Manuel II Palaiologos passed through the ruins of Pompeiopolis in 1391, during Bayezid I's campaigns, and described its desolate state after its destruction by the Turks.

== Archeology ==
In 2006, an international project for a holistic investigation of Pompeiopolis was initiated with extended surveys and excavations. Since 2017 the Kastamonu Museum has been carrying out annual excavations and conservation activities for the touristic development of the site. Although no remains were visible on the surface in 2005, a systematic geophysical survey over Zımbıllı Tepe detected the outline of a large city with roads, public buildings, and two theaters that were successively archaeologically investigated. The excavations in the major theatre unearthed the lowest marble seat rows as well as inscribed architraves with decorated friezes from the scaenae frons. From the inscription, it is understood that at least the stage was built around 150 AD. The theatre was dismantled within the 5th century. Scarce remains of an octagonal building were previously identified as the tholos of a macellum, but a few Christian graves that were excavated in the area in 2016 have suggested a later use as a church.

A multiphase Roman domus at the north-eastern foot of Zımbıllı Tepe was first discovered in 1984 by a rescue intervention of the Museum of Kastamonu and reopened in 2006-2008 by a German team. The grand-house occupies a whole block within a network of orthogonal roads that organize the urban plan of this part of the city. The north-eastern blocks were built around the middle of the 3rd century AD, and were progressively deserted since the beginning of the 7th century, with few episodes of partial reoccupation recorded until the 12th century. The grand-house is 2,550 square metres wide, its layout is organized around a central peristyle, and the northern side is provided by an honour court with direct accesses to wealthy reception rooms decorated with opus sectile wall revetments and mosaic floors. At least four rooms were equipped with a hypocaust heating system. The extensive excavation of the grand-house, still in progress, is accompanied by a systematic conservation program financed by the Meda Foundation, aimed at preserving and developing the monument into a public archaeological area with the involvement of local expertise and stakeholders.

Although no architectural remains in hitherto excavated areas can yet be assigned to the early phase of the city several coins found from this period confirm the localization of Pompeiopolis on the Zımbıllı Tepe. The stone bridge which spans the Amnias River linked the Roman period urban center on the Zımbıllı Tepe with the opposite riverbank, where the farmlands of the city were situated. The city center was gradually moved to the floodplain at the southern riverbank during the early Byzantine period. The Byzantine Pompeiopolis is covered today by Taşköprü, where building remains and finds are observed in the construction pits of the underground car park of Cumhuriyet Meydanı. The excavated archaeological findings are exhibited or stored in the Museum of Archaeology of Kastamonu. A small museum adjacent to the excavation house, created in 2014, exhibits stone monuments like inscriptions, architectural elements, and grave stelae from the city. The Municipal History Museum in Taşköprü, established in 2017, presents some hypothetical digital reconstructions of the city's lost appearance.

In November 2026, archaeologists announced further discoveries at Pompeiopolis. Excavations during the 2026 archaeological season revealed an extensive Roman mosaic inside a monumental basilica, together with a sculpted head of Eros. The mosaic covers approximately 120–130 square metres and consists of geometric decorative compositions. It was uncovered across the central and eastern aisles of the basilica and dates to approximately the fourth century AD. The pavement is relatively well preserved, although some sections require conservation to stabilise damaged areas and secure individual tesserae.

== Bibliography ==
- Annual excavation reports published in KST by Lâtife Summerer (2006-2016): https://kvmgm.ktb.gov.tr/TR-238493/kazi-sonuclari-toplantisi-02---35.html
- Christian Marek, "Pompeiopolis", Der Neue Pauly (DNP). Band 10, Metzler, Stuttgart 2001, ISBN 3-476-01480-0.
- Julie Dalaison, "L'atelier monétaire de Pompeiopolis en Paphlagonie", in Delrieux (F.) et Kayser (Fr.), éd., Hommages offerts à François Bertrandy, Tome 1: Des déserts d'Afrique au pays des Allobroges, Laboratoire Langages, Littératures, Sociétés, Collection Sociétés, Religions, Politiques, n° 16, Chambéry, 2010, p. 45-81.
- Latife Summerer, Alexander von Kienlin, "Pompeiopolis. Metropolis of Paphlagonia," Hadrien Bru, Guy Labarre (ed.), L'Anatolie des peuples, des cités et des cultures. (IIe millénaire av. J.-C. - Ve siècle ap. J.-C.). Colloque international de Besançon - 26-27 novembre 2010 (2 vols.). Besançon: Presses universitaires de Franche-Comté, 2014. 115-126. ISBN 9782848674735.
- Lâtife Summerer (ed.): Pompeiopolis I: Eine Zwischenbilanz aus der Metropole Paphlagoniens nach fünf Kampagnen (2006-2010) Beier & Beran, Langenweißbach 2011, ISBN 978-3-941171-63-3.
- Jörg W. E. Fassbinder Geophysikalische Prospektion in Pompeiopolis, in: Lâtife Summerer (ed.), Pompeiopolis I: eine Zwischenbilanz aus der Metropole Paphlagoniens nach fünf Kampagnen (2006–2010). Schriften des Zentrums für Archäologie und Kulturgeschichte des Schwarzmeerraumes, Bd 21. Langenweißbach: Beier and Beran, 2011, 17-28.
- Luisa Musso et al., L’edificio abitativo alle pendici orientali dello Zımbıllı Tepe, in: Lâtife Summerer (ed.), Pompeiopolis I: eine Zwischenbilanz aus der Metropole Paphlagoniens nach fünf Kampagnen (2006–2010). Schriften des Zentrums für Archäologie und Kulturgeschichte des Schwarzmeerraumes, Bd 21. Langenweißbach: Beier and Beran, 2011, 75-120.
- Lâtife Summerer, Alexander von Kienlin, Georg Herdt, Frühe Forschungen in Paphlagonien - Neue Grabungen in Pompeiopolis, Anatolian Metal IV, Beiheft 25, Bochum 2013, 257-266.
- Ruth Bielfeldt, Das Macellum von Pompeiopolis: eine neue kleinasiatische Marktanlage mit oktogonaler Tholos, in: Lâtife Summerer (ed.), Pompeiopolis I: eine Zwischenbilanz aus der Metropole Paphlagoniens nach fünf Kampagnen (2006–2010). Schriften des Zentrums für Archäologie und Kulturgeschichte des Schwarzmeerraumes, Bd 21. Langenweißbach: Beier and Beran, 2011, 49-62.
- Alexander von Kienlin, Topographie und bauliche Entwicklung in Pompeiopolis, in: Lâtife Summerer (ed.), Pompeiopolis I: eine Zwischenbilanz aus der Metropole Paphlagoniens nach fünf Kampagnen (2006–2010). Schriften des Zentrums für Archäologie und Kulturgeschichte des Schwarzmeerraumes, Bd 21. Langenweißbach: Beier and Beran, 2011, 215-230.
- Peri Johnson, How did the landscape of Pompeiopolis become Roman? in: K. Winther-Jacobson - L. Summerer, Landscape Dynamics and Settlement Patterns in northern Anatolia during the Roman and Byzantine Period (Stuttgart 2015) p. 61-82.
- Lâtife Summerer, Pompeiopolis-Taşköprü. 2000 Years from Metropolis to County Town (Istanbul 2017).
- J. Koch, Die Grabdenkmäler aus Pompeiopolis in Paphlagonien. Untersuchungen zur Typologie, Chronologie und Ikonographie der kaiserzeitlichen Sepulkralkust in Kleinasien. PhD Thesis 2018 Ludwig-Maximilians-Universität München. (awarded with the prize of Faculty of Cultural Sciences 2018 and in print at Pompeiopolis series at Zentrum for Archäologie und Kunstgeschichte des Schwarzmeerraumes (ZAKS).
- Lâtife Summerer, Revisiting Strabo 12.3.40: Along the Amnias Valley toward Pompeiopolis, Pimolisa and Sandracurgium, Geographia Antiqua 28 (2019), 113-125.
- Lâtife Summerer, The γέφυρα ἐκ λίθων of Pompeiopolis and the Stone Bridge of Taşköprü, in: G. Fingerova and A. Künzel (eds), Territories and Boundaries. Crossing Rivers at Byzantium and Beyond. (Tournhout/Brepols 2025) 275-301.
- Max Ritter, Vier byzantinische Bleisiegel aus der Grabung

Pompeiopolis (Paphlagonien), Mainzer Veröffentlichungen 18, 2024, 175-187. zur Byzantinistik
