= Annia Galeria Aurelia Faustina =

2nd century Roman noblewoman

Annia Galeria Aurelia Faustina (c. 151/153 - after 165) was a daughter of Roman emperor Marcus Aurelius and his wife, Faustina the Younger. Her sister was empress Lucilla and her younger brother was Commodus. Her maternal grandparents were Antoninus Pius and Faustina the Elder, while her paternal grandparents were Domitia Lucilla and the praetor Marcus Annius Verus. She was born and raised in Rome.

The parents of Faustina betrothed her to Gnaeus Claudius Severus, whom she later married after 159. Gnaeus Claudius Severus was a Roman Senator of Pontian Greek descent who came from Pompeiopolis, a city in the Roman province of Galatia. After Faustina married Claudius Severus, they settled in Pompeiopolis. Faustina bore Claudius Severus a son, Tiberius Claudius Severus Proculus, who served as consul in 200.

== Sources ==
- https://www.livius.org/fa-fn/faustina/faustina_ii.html
