= Faustina the Younger =

Roman empress from 161 to 175

- Diva Augusta
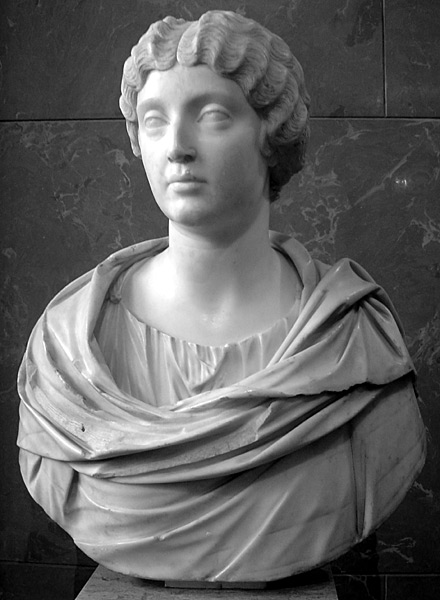
- Bust, c. 161 AD

Roman empress consort
- Tenure: 7 March 161 – 175 (alongside Lucilla from 164–169)
- Born: c. 130; Rome, Italy
- Died: 175/76 (aged c. 45); Halala, Cappadocia
- Burial: Mausoleum of Hadrian
- Spouse: Marcus Aurelius (m. 145)
- Issue Among others: Lucilla; Faustina; Fadilla; Cornificia Faustina minor Commodus; Annius Verus; Sabina
Names
- Annia Galeria Faustina Minor
Regnal name
- Annia Galeria Faustina Augusta Minor
- Dynasty: Nerva–Antonine
- Father: Antoninus Pius
- Mother: Faustina the Elder

Annia Galeria Faustina the Younger (c. 130 AD, (Note: The Feriale Duranum records the birthday of Diva Faustina as 20–22 September (between 10 and 12 days before the kalends of October). However, this could be either Faustina II or her mother Faustina I. A Roman inscription records the birthday of Faustinae uxoris Antonini as 16 February (14 days before the kalends of March). The text could refer to either Faustina II, who married Marcus Aurelius Antoninus, or Faustina I, who married Antoninus Pius.) – 175/176 AD) was Roman empress from 161 to her death as the wife of emperor Marcus Aurelius, her maternal cousin. Faustina was the youngest child of emperor Antoninus Pius and empress Faustina the Elder. She was held in high esteem by soldiers and her husband as Augusta and Mater Castrorum ('Mother of the Camp') and was given divine honours after her death.

== Life ==
=== Early life ===
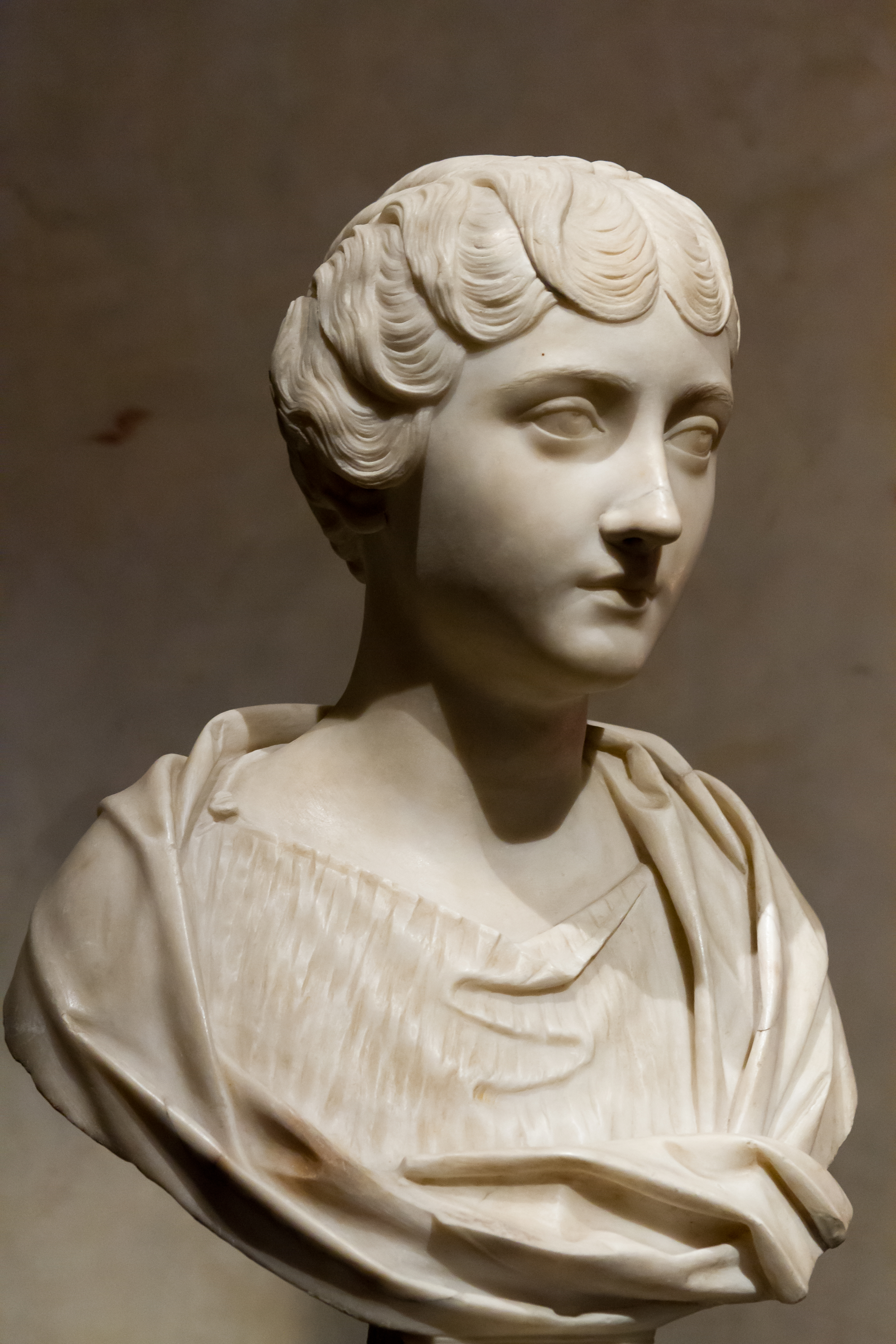
Bust of a young Faustina Minor, 147–48 AD, in the Musei Capitolini.

Faustina, named after her mother, was her parents' fourth and youngest child and second daughter; she was also their only child to survive to adulthood. She was born and raised in Rome.

Her second cousin three times removed, Hadrian, had arranged with her father for Faustina to marry Lucius Verus. On 25 February 138, she and Verus were betrothed. Verus' father Lucius Aelius Caesar was Hadrian's adopted son and intended heir, but died prematurely. Instead Hadrian adopted Faustina's father Antoninus, who eventually succeeded him as emperor. Antonius ended the engagement between his daughter and Verus, instead betrothing Faustina to her biological maternal cousin Marcus Aurelius, whom he also adopted.

=== Imperial heiress ===
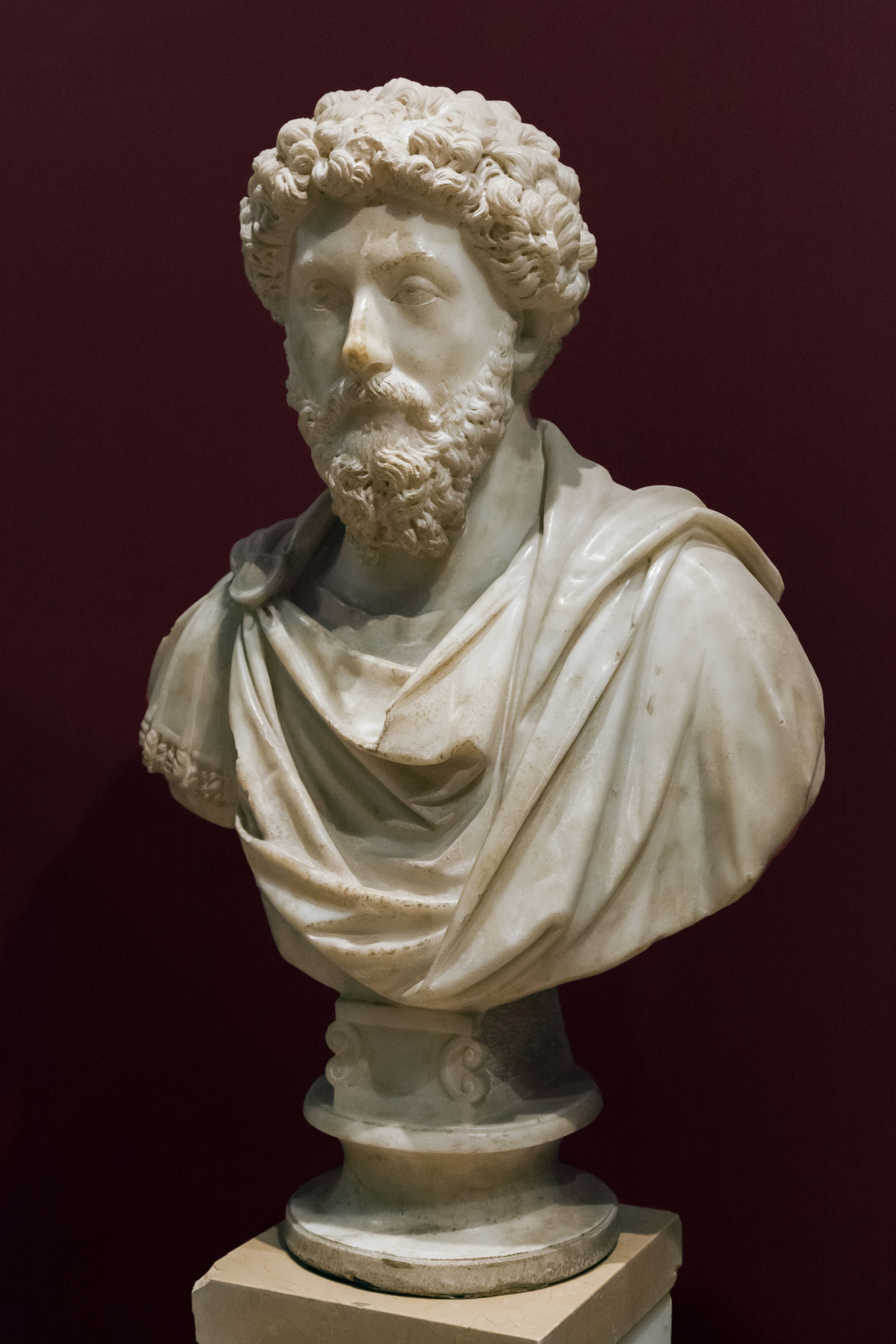
Bust of Marcus Aurelius in the Archaeological Museum of Istanbul, Turkey

In April or May 145, Faustina and Marcus Aurelius were married, as had been planned since 138. Since Aurelius was, by adoption, Antoninus Pius' son, under Roman law he was marrying his sister; Antoninus would have had to formally release one or the other from his paternal authority (his patria potestas) for the ceremony to take place. Little is specifically known of the ceremony, but it is said to have been "noteworthy". Coins were issued with the heads of the couple, and Antoninus, as Pontifex maximus, would have officiated. Marcus makes no apparent reference to the marriage in his surviving letters, and only sparing references to Faustina. Faustina was given the title of Augusta on 1 December 147 after the birth of her first child, Domitia Faustina.

=== Empress ===
When Antoninus died on 7 March 161, Marcus and Lucius Verus ascended to the throne and became co-rulers. Faustina then became empress. Following the birth of her first child in 147, Faustina obtained the title of Augusta granted to her by the Senate, before her husband Marcus Aurelius became Augustus himself in 161.

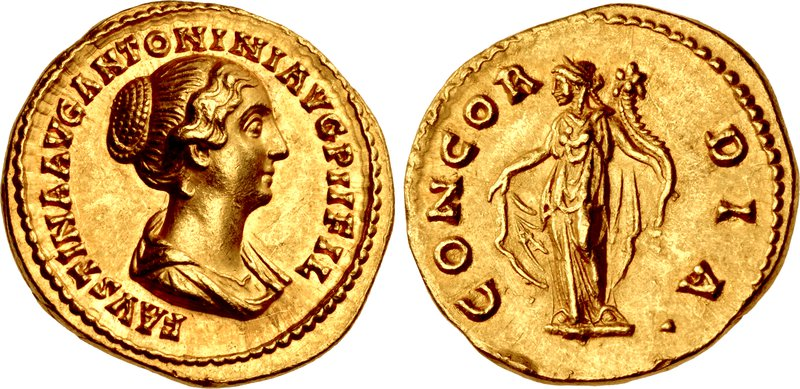
Aureus of Antoninus Pius, struck at the Rome mint, dated c. 147–152. Obv: Bust of Faustina the Younger. Rev: Goddess Concordia standing.

Not much has survived from the Roman sources regarding Faustina's life, but what is available does not give a good report. Cassius Dio and the unreliable Historia Augusta accuse Faustina of ordering deaths by poison and execution; she has also been accused of instigating the revolt of Avidius Cassius against her husband. The Historia Augusta mentions adultery with sailors, gladiators, and men of rank; however, Faustina and Aurelius seem to have been very close and mutually devoted.

Faustina accompanied her husband on various military campaigns and enjoyed the excessive love and reverence of Roman soldiers. Aurelius gave her the title of Mater Castrorum or 'Mother of the Camp'. She was in the north from 170 until 175, when she accompanied Aurelius to the east.

=== Revolt of Avidius Cassius and death ===
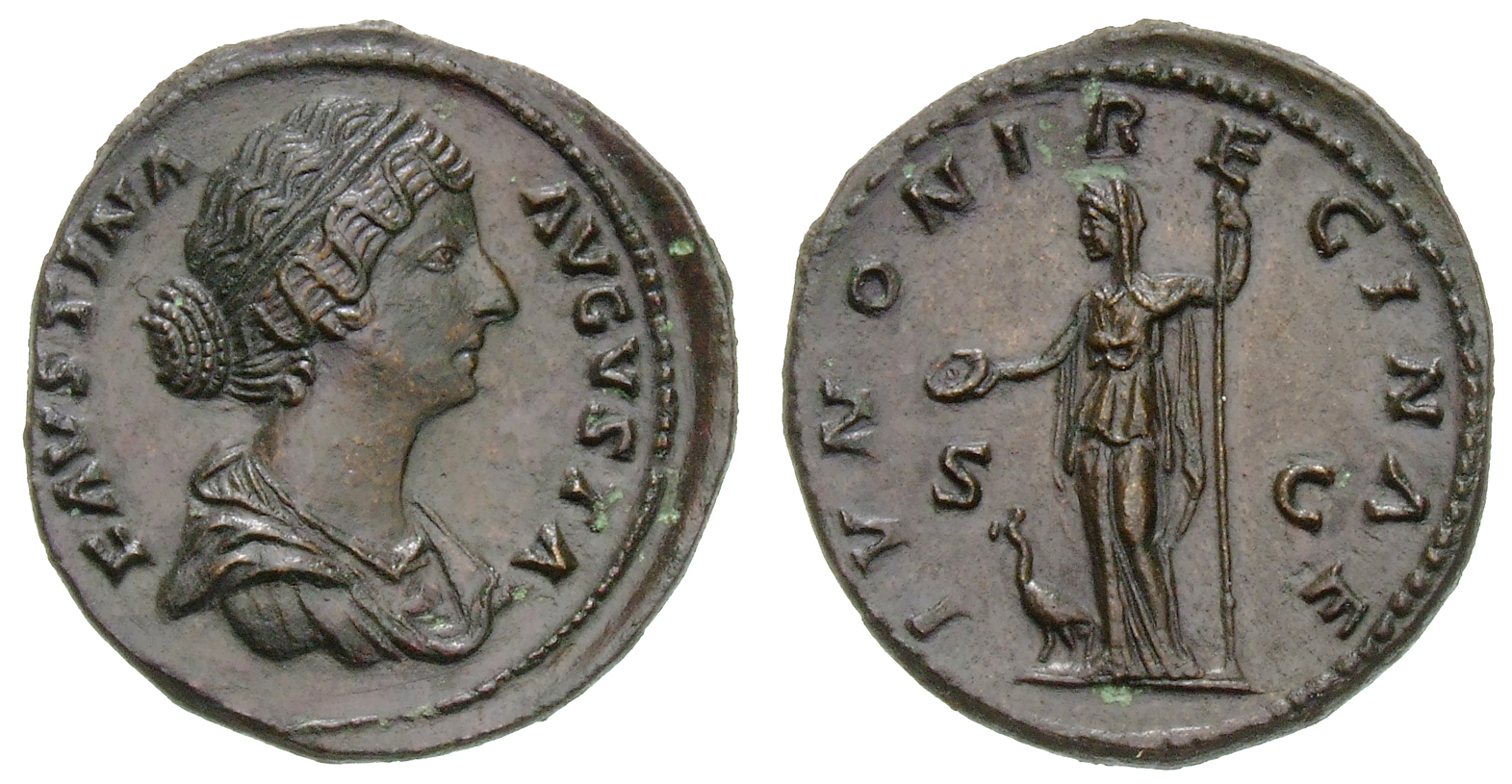
Sestertius of Marcus Aurelius, struck at the Rome mint, dated 174. Obv: Bust of Faustina the Younger. Rev: Juno standing.

There is evidence, some of it from his own Meditations, that Aurelius was seriously ill in 175. A false report of his death caused the general Avidius Cassius to be proclaimed as the new Roman emperor. The sources say that Faustina, fearful that Aurelius was genuinely on the point of death, supported Cassius so that he might be a protector for her son Commodus, aged 13. She also wanted someone who would act as a counter-weight to the claims of Tiberius Claudius Pompeianus, who was in a strong position to succeed Marcus as Princeps. "After a dream of empire lasting three months and six days", Cassius was murdered by a centurion; Egypt, which had supported his claims, recognized Marcus as emperor again by 28 July 175.

Faustina died in the winter of 175 at the military camp in Halala (a city in the Taurus Mountains in Cappadocia). The causes of her death are debated by scholars and range from death from natural causes, suicide, an accident, or even possibly assassination in retaliation for her alleged affair with Cassius earlier that year, depending on the source.

Aurelius grieved much for his wife and buried her in the Mausoleum of Hadrian in Rome. She was deified, with her statue placed in the Temple of Venus in Rome and a temple dedicated to her in her honor. Halala's name was changed to Faustinopolis and Aurelius opened charity schools for orphan girls called Puellae Faustinianae or 'Girls of Faustina'. The Baths of Faustina in Miletus are named after her.

== Marriage and issue ==
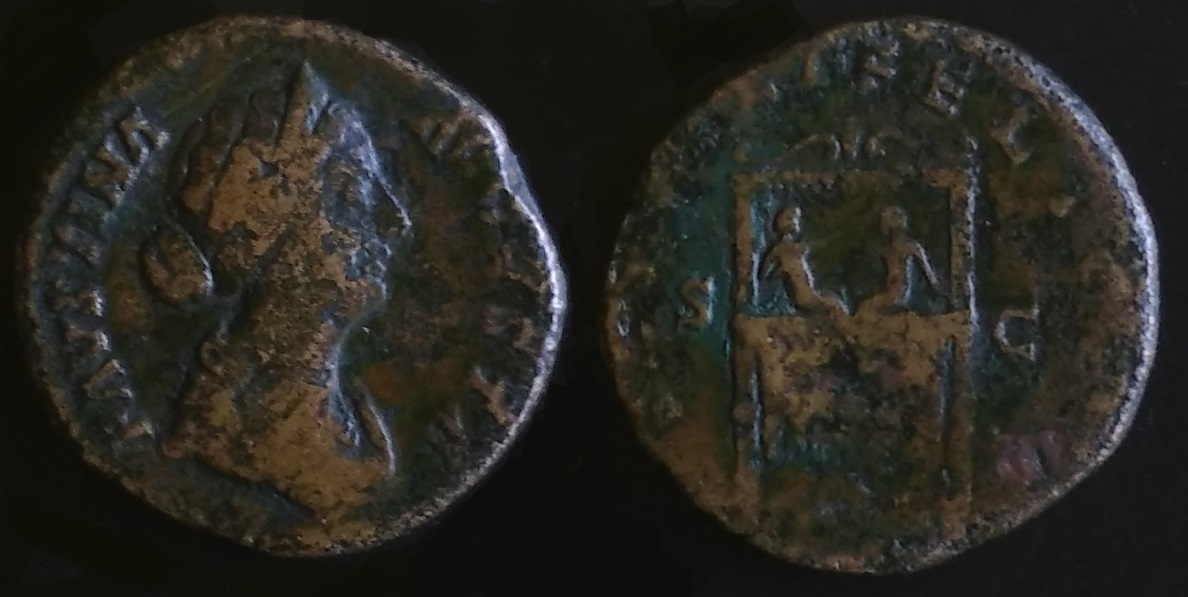
Sestertius celebrating the birth of Commodus and his twin brother

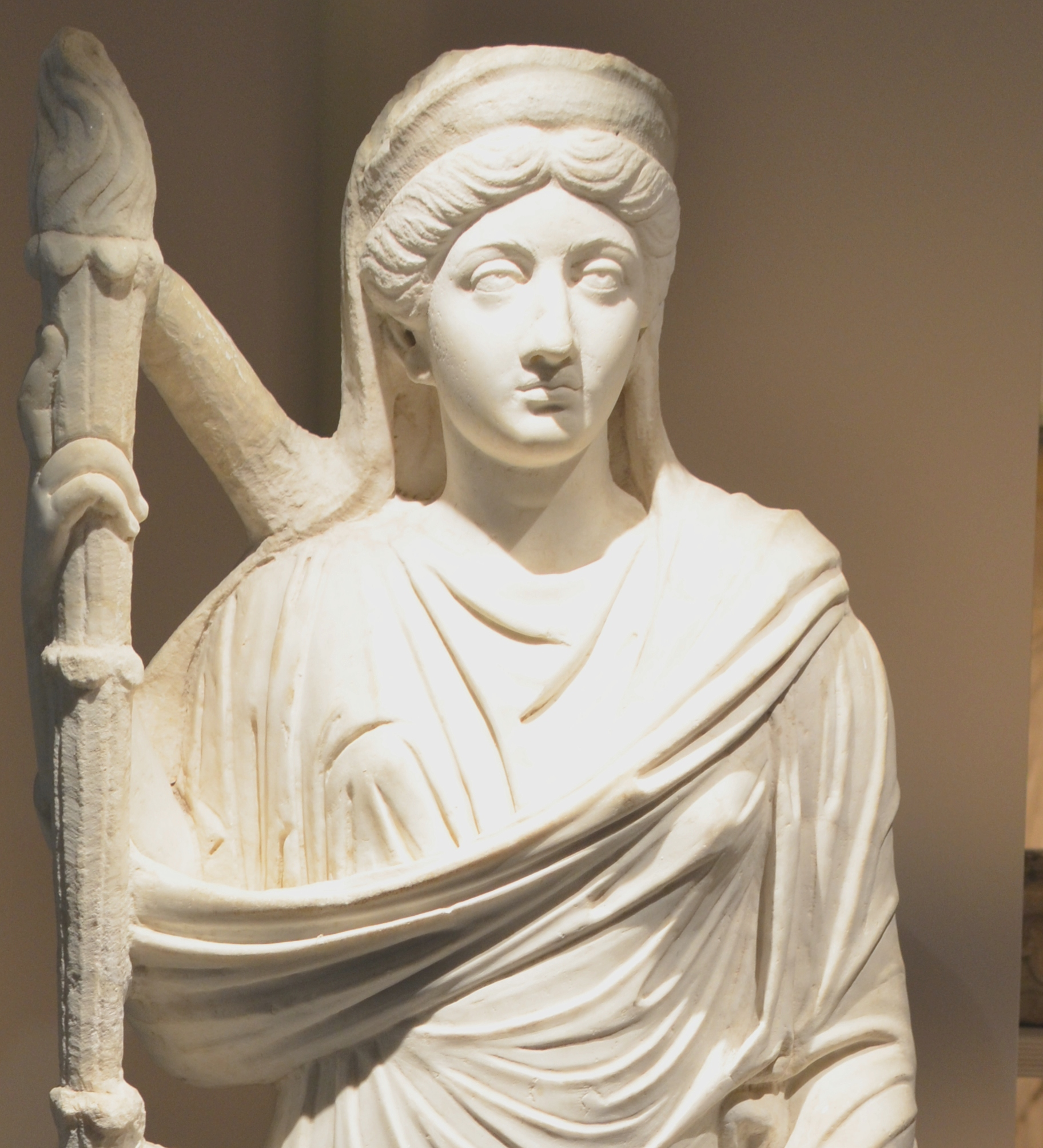
Marble statue of Faustina's daughter and joint empress Lucilla, Bardo National Museum, Tunisia

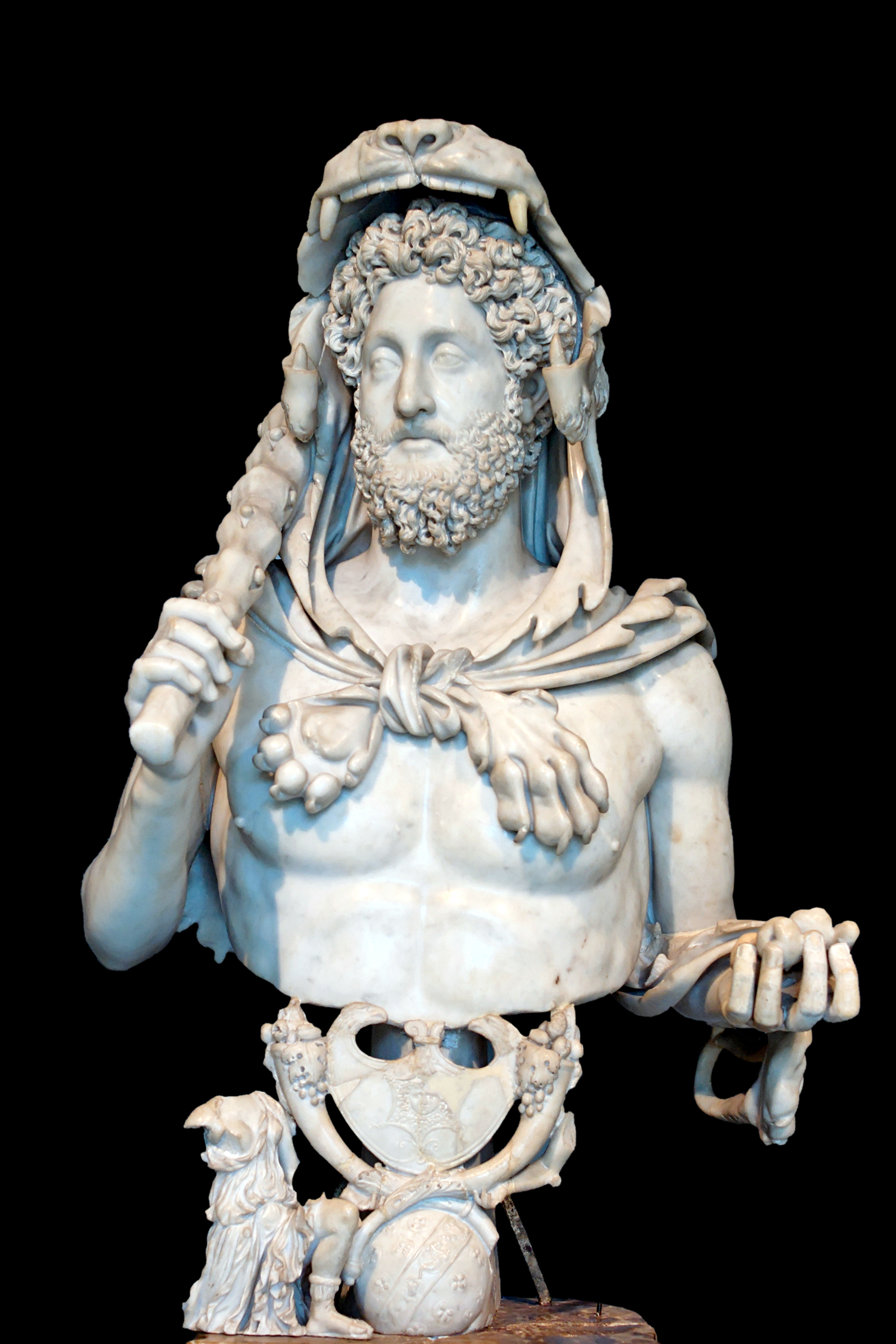
Commodus as Hercules, Capitoline Museums

In their thirty years of marriage, Faustina and Marcus Aurelius had at least fourteen children, including two sets of twins. Only six of them survived to adulthood, five daughters and the son Commodus.

Faustina's role as a mother was glorified, and with the birth of her daughter Fadilla, coins were issued portraying her as Juno Lucina.

Their known children were:

- Domitia Faustina (147–151), died in childhood;
- Titus Aelius Antoninus (born and died in 149), twin of Aurelius, died in infancy;
- Titus Aelius Aurelius (born and died in 149), twin of Antoninus, died in infancy;
- Annia Aurelia Galeria Lucilla (150–182), married her father's co-ruler Lucius Verus, then Tiberius Claudius Pompeianus, had issue from both marriages;
- Annia Galeria Aurelia Faustina (born in 151), married Gnaeus Claudius Severus, had a son;
- Tiberius Aelius Antoninus (born in 152, died before 156), died in childhood;
- Unknown child (died before 158), died in childhood;
- Annia Aurelia Fadilla (born in 159), married Marcus Peducaeus Plautius Quintillus, had issue;
- Annia Cornificia Faustina Minor (born in 160), married Marcus Petronius Sura Mamertinus, had a son;
- Titus Aurelius Fulvus Antoninus (161–165), elder twin brother of Commodus, died in childhood;
- Lucius Aurelius Commodus Antoninus (Commodus) (161–192), twin brother of Titus Aurelius Fulvus Antoninus, later emperor, married Bruttia Crispina, no issue;
- Marcus Annius Verus Caesar (162–169), died in childhood;
- Hadrianus, died in infancy;
- Vibia Aurelia Sabina (170 – died before 217), married Lucius Antistius Burrus, no issue.

== Nerva–Antonine family tree ==
Nerva–Antonine family tree

Q. Marcius Barea Soranus	Q. Marcius Barea Sura	Antonia Furnilla	M. Cocceius Nerva	Sergia Plautilla	P. Aelius Hadrianus
Titus (r. 79–81)	Marcia Furnilla	Marcia	Trajanus Pater	Nerva (r. 96–98)	Ulpia (Note: Sister of Trajan's father: Giacosa (1977), p. 7.)	Aelius Hadrianus Marullinus
Flavia (Note: Giacosa (1977), p. 8.)	Marciana (Note: Levick (2014), p. 161.)	C. Salonius Matidius (Note: Husband of Ulpia Marciana: Levick (2014), p. 161.)	Trajan (r. 98–117)	Plotina	P. Acilius Attianus	P. Aelius Afer (Note: Giacosa (1977), p. 7.)	Paulina Major (Note: DIR contributor (Herbert W. Benario, 2000), "Hadrian".)
Lucius Mindius (2)	Libo Rupilius Frugi (3)	Salonia Matidia (Note: Giacosa (1977), p. 9.)	L. Vibius Sabinus (1) (Note: Husband of Salonia Matidia: Levick (2014), p. 161.)
Paulina Minor	L. Julius Ursus Servianus (Note: Smith (1870), "Julius Servianus".)
Matidia Minor	Sabina	Hadrian (Note: Smith (1870), "Hadrian", pp. 319–322.) (r. 117–138)	Antinous (Note: Lover of Hadrian: Lambert (1984), p. 99 and passim; deification: Lamber (1984), pp. 2–5, etc.)
C. Fuscus Salinator I	Julia Serviana Paulina
M. Annius Verus (Note: Husband of Rupilia Faustina: Levick (2014), p. 163.)	Rupilia Faustina (Note: Levick (2014), p. 163.) (Note: It is uncertain whether Rupilia Faustina was Frugi's daughter by Salonia Matidia or another woman.)	Boionia Procilla	Cn. Arrius Antoninus
L. Ceionius Commodus	Appia Severa	C. Fuscus Salinator II
L. Caesennius Paetus	Arria Antonina	Arria Fadilla (Note: Levick (2014), p. 162.)	T. Aurelius Fulvus
L. Caesennius Antoninus	L. Commodus	Plautia	unknown (Note: Levick (2014), p. 164.)	C. Avidius Nigrinus
M. Annius Verus	Calvisia Domitia Lucilla (Note: Wife of M. Annius Verus: Giacosa (1977), p. 10.)	Fundania (Note: Wife of M. Annius Libo: Levick (2014), p. 163.)	M. Annius Libo	Faustina	Antoninus Pius (r. 138–161)	L. Aelius Caesar	Avidia
Cornificia	Marcus Aurelius (r. 161–180) (Note: Giacosa (1977), p. 10.)	Faustina Minor	C. Avidius Cassius (Note: The epitomator of Cassius Dio (72.22) gives the story that Faustina the Elder promised to marry Avidius Cassius. This is also echoed in HA "Marcus Aurelius" 24.)	Aurelia Fadilla	Lucius Verus (r. 161–169) (1)	Ceionia Fabia	Plautius Quintillus (Note: Husband of Ceionia Fabia: Levick (2014), p. 164.)	Q. Servilius Pudens	Ceionia Plautia
Cornificia Minor (Note: Levick (2014), p. 117.)	M. Petronius Sura	Commodus (r. 177–192)	Fadilla	M. Annius Verus Caesar	Ti. Claudius Pompeianus (2)	Lucilla	M. Plautius Quintillus	Junius Licinius Balbus	Servilia Ceionia
Petronius Antoninus	L. Aurelius Agaclytus (2)	Aurelia Sabina	L. Antistius Burrus (1)	Plautius Quintillus	Plautia Servilla	C. Furius Sabinus Timesitheus	Maecia Faustina	Junius Licinius Balbus?
Furia Sabinia Tranquillina	Gordian III (r. 238–244)

- (1) = 1st spouse
- (2) = 2nd spouse
- (3) = 3rd spouse
- Reddish-purple indicates emperor of the Nerva–Antonine dynasty
  lighter purple indicates designated imperial heir of said dynasty who never reigned
  grey indicates unsuccessful imperial aspirants
  bluish-purple indicates emperors of other dynasties
- dashed lines indicate adoption; dotted lines indicate love affairs/unmarried relationships
- Small Caps = posthumously deified (Augusti, Augustae, or other)

Notes:

Except where otherwise noted, the notes below indicate that an individual's parentage is as shown in the above family tree.

References:
- Giacosa, Giorgio (1977). Women of the Caesars: Their Lives and Portraits on Coins. Translated by Holloway, R. Ross. Milan: Edizioni Arte e Moneta. ISBN 0-8390-0193-2.
- Lambert, Royston (1984). Beloved and God: The Story of Hadrian and Antinous. New York: Viking. ISBN 0-670-15708-2.
- Levick, Barbara (2014). Faustina I and II: Imperial Women of the Golden Age. Oxford University Press. ISBN 978-0-19-537941-9.
- Smith, William, ed. (1870). Dictionary of Greek and Roman Biography and Mythology.
