= Nerva–Antonine dynasty =

Dynasty of 7 Roman Emperors from 96 AD to 192

The Nerva–Antonine dynasty comprised seven Roman emperors who ruled from 96 AD to 192 AD: Nerva (96–98), Trajan (98–117), Hadrian (117–138), Antoninus Pius (138–161), Marcus Aurelius (161–180), Lucius Verus (161–169), and Commodus (177–192). The first five of these are popularly known as the "Five Good Emperors".

The first five of the six successions within this dynasty were notable in that the reigning emperor did not have a male heir, and had to adopt the candidate of his choice to be his successor. Under Roman law, an adoption established a bond legally as strong as that of kinship.

It was common for patrician families to adopt, and Roman emperors had adopted heirs in the past: the Emperor Augustus had adopted Tiberius, and the Emperor Claudius had adopted Nero. Julius Caesar, dictator perpetuo and considered to be instrumental in the transition from Republic to Empire, adopted Gaius Octavius, who later became Augustus, Rome's first emperor. Moreover, there were often still family connections: Trajan adopted his first cousin once removed and great-nephew by marriage Hadrian, Hadrian made his half-nephew by marriage Antoninus Pius heir, and the latter adopted both Hadrian's half-great-nephew by marriage Marcus Aurelius (Antonius' nephew by marriage) and the son of Hadrian's original planned successor, Lucius Verus. Marcus Aurelius's naming of his son Commodus as heir was considered to be an unfortunate choice and the beginning of the Empire's decline.

With the murder of Commodus in 192, the Nerva–Antonine dynasty came to an end. It was followed by a brief period of turbulence known as the Year of the Five Emperors which ended with the establishment of the new Severan dynasty.

== History ==
=== Nerva–Trajan dynasty ===
Nerva–Trajan dynasty (r. 96–138)

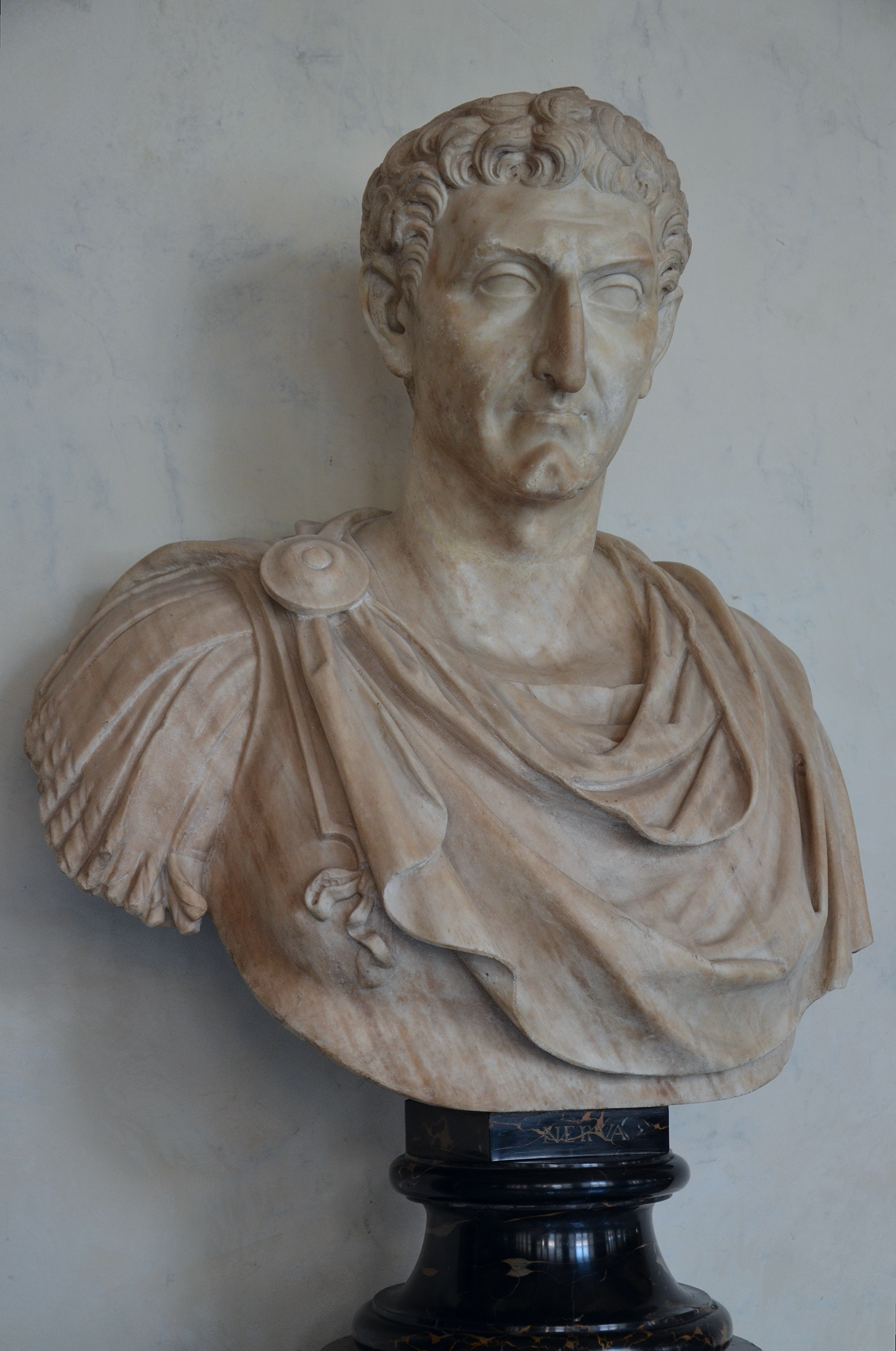
Nerva (r. 96–98)

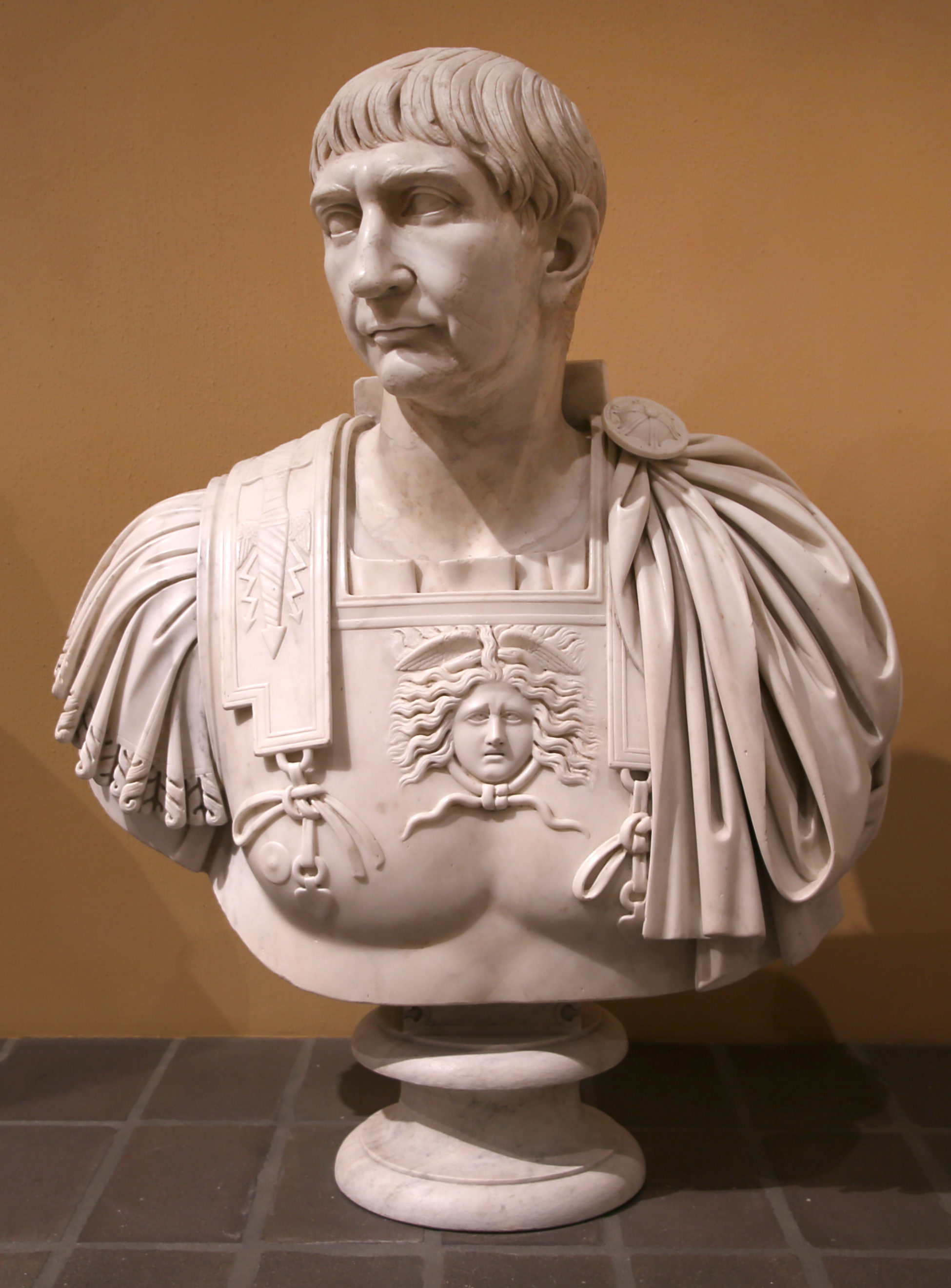
Trajan (r. 98–117)

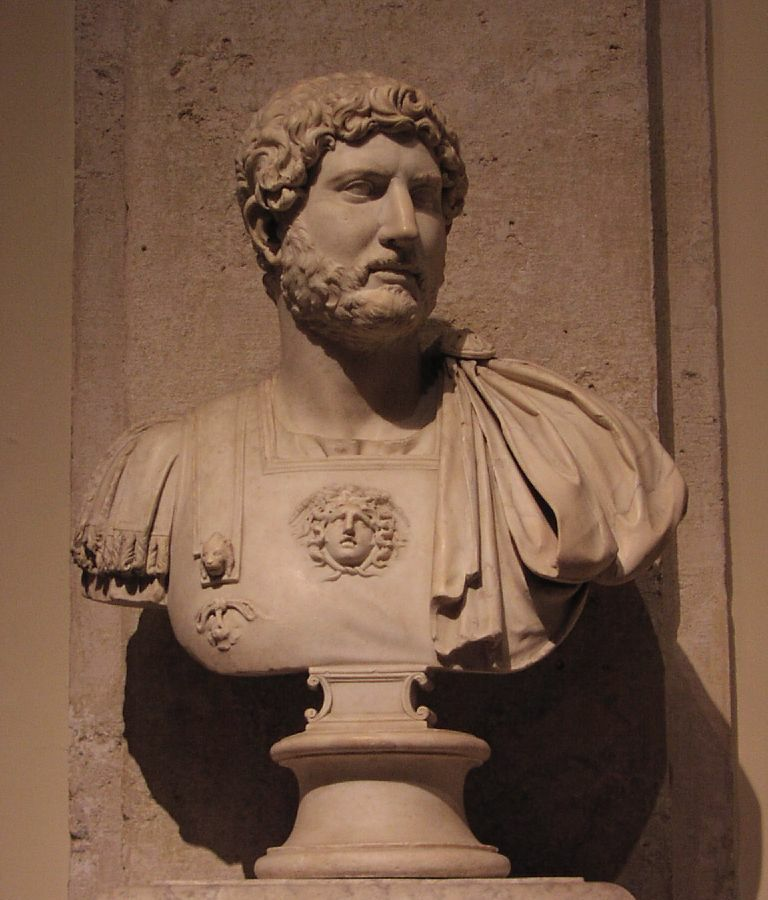
Hadrian (r. 117–138)

Nerva was the first of the dynasty. Though his reign was short, it saw a partial reconciliation between the army, the senate and the commoners, as well as the public denouncement of his predecessor Domitian's comparatively ruthless demeanor. Nerva adopted as his son the popular military leader Trajan. In turn, Hadrian succeeded Trajan; he had been the latter's heir presumptive, and averred that he had been adopted by him on Trajan's deathbed.

=== Antonine dynasty ===
Antonine dynasty (r. 138–192)

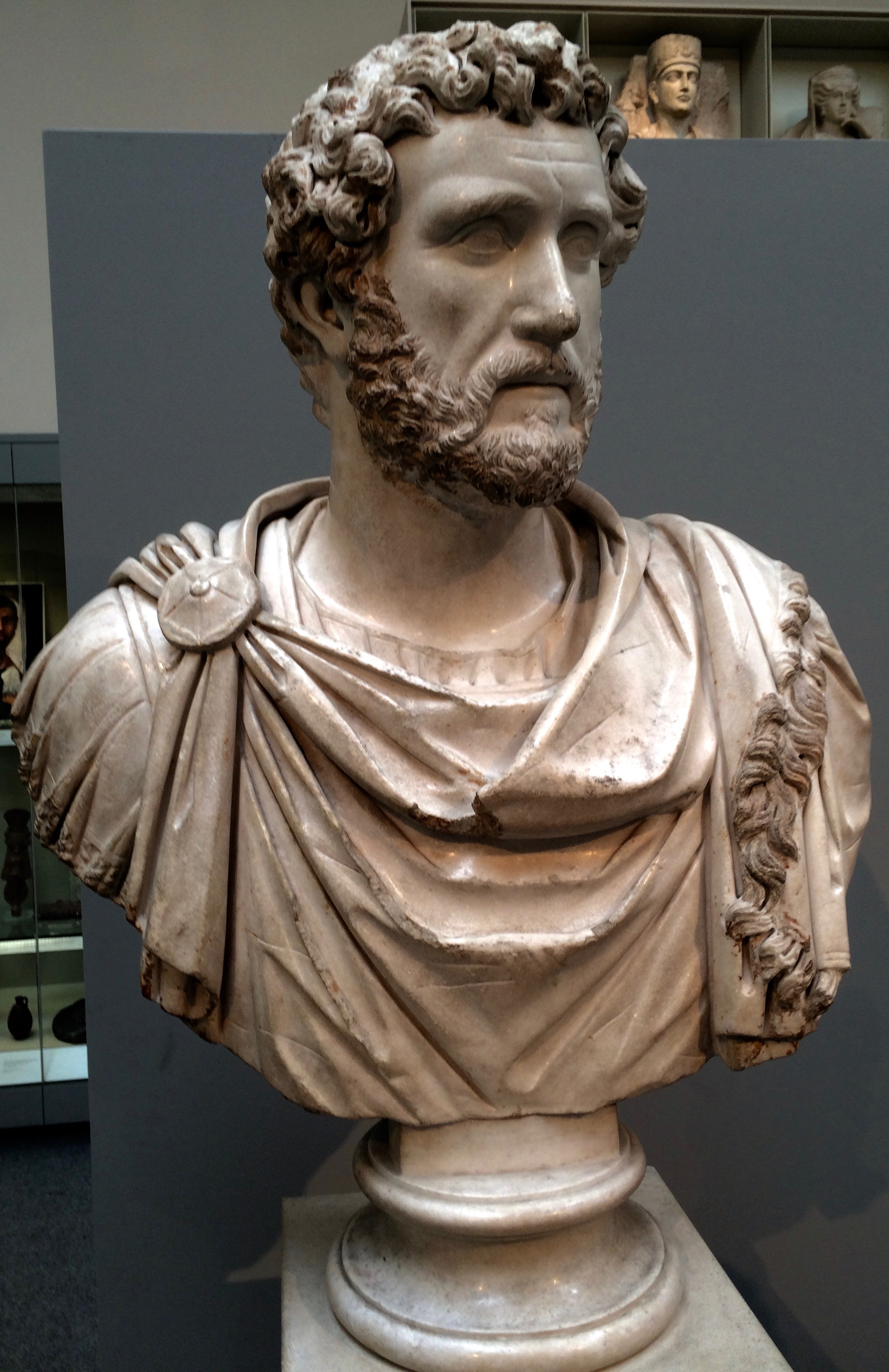
Antoninus Pius (r. 138–161)

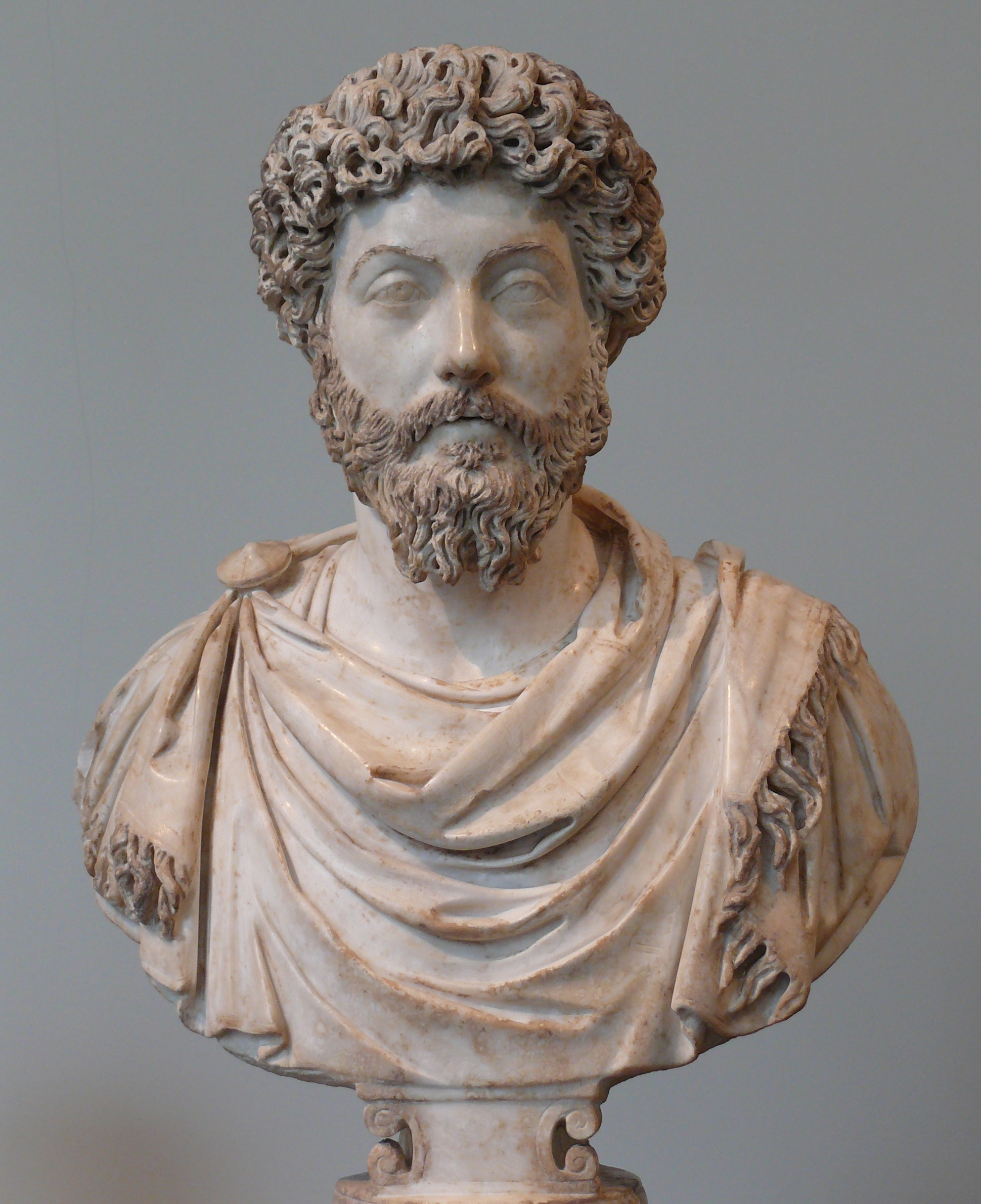
Marcus Aurelius (r. 161–180)

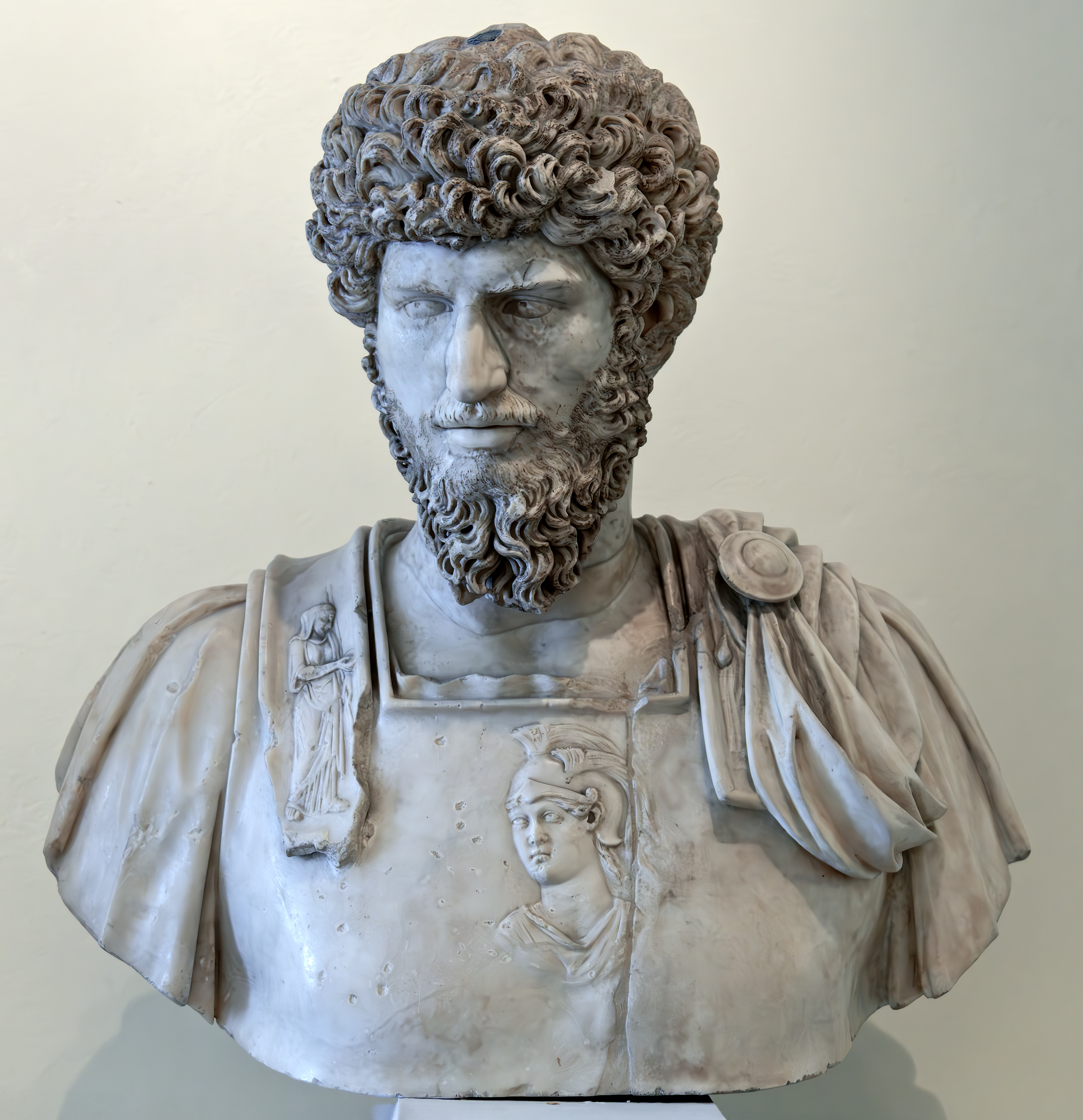
Lucius Verus (r. 161–169)

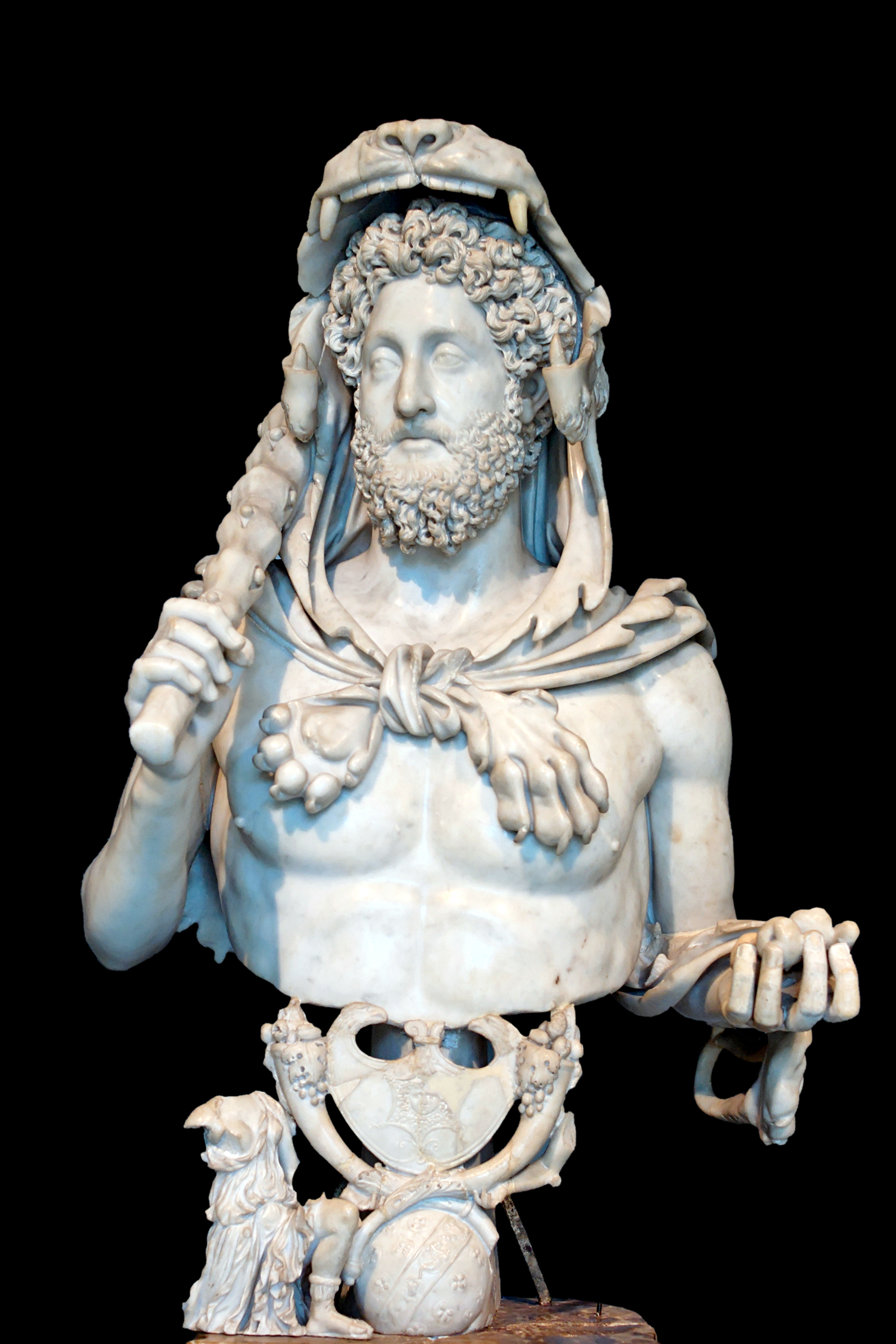
Commodus (r. 177–192)

The Antonines are four Roman Emperors who ruled between 138 and 192: Antoninus Pius, Marcus Aurelius, Lucius Verus and Commodus.

In 138, after a long reign dedicated to the cultural unification and consolidation of the empire, the Emperor Hadrian named Antoninus Pius his son and heir, under the condition that he adopt both Marcus Aurelius and Lucius Verus. Hadrian died that same year, and Antoninus began a peaceful, benevolent reign. He adhered strictly to Roman traditions and institutions, and shared his power with the Roman Senate.

Marcus Aurelius and Lucius Verus succeeded Antoninus Pius in 161 upon that emperor's death, and co-ruled until Verus' death in 169. Marcus continued the Antonine legacy after Verus' death as an unpretentious and gifted administrator and leader. He died in 180 and was followed by his biological son, Commodus.

== The Five Good Emperors ==
The rulers commonly known as the "Five Good Emperors" were Nerva, Trajan, Hadrian, Antoninus Pius, and Marcus Aurelius, who reigned from 96 AD to 180 AD. The term is based on Niccolò Machiavelli's review on Roman emperors in Book 1, Chapter 10 of his book The Discourses on Livy:

From the study of this history we may also learn how a good government is to be established; for while all the emperors who succeeded to the throne by birth, except Titus, were bad, all were good who succeeded by adoption; as in the case of the five from Nerva to Marcus. But so soon as the empire fell once more to the heirs by birth, its ruin recommenced.

Machiavelli argued that these adopted emperors earned the respect of those around them through good governance:

Titus, Nerva, Trajan, Hadrian, Antoninus, and Marcus had no need of praetorian cohorts, or of countless legions to guard them, but were defended by their own good lives, the good-will of their subjects, and the attachment of the senate.

Edward Gibbon wrote in The History of the Decline and Fall of the Roman Empire that their rule was a time when "the Roman Empire was governed by absolute power, under the guidance of wisdom and virtue". Gibbon believed that these benevolent monarchs and their moderate policies were unusual and contrasted with their more tyrannical and oppressive successors.

== Timeline ==
- Red denotes Senior Emperors
- Pink denotes Junior Emperors
- Blue denotes Caesars (official heirs)
