= Paternus (disambiguation) =

Paternus (Welsh Padarn) may refer to:

- Aspasius Paternus, (fl. 3rd century), Roman official
- Ovinius Paternus, consul 267
- Paternus (consul 269), Roman consul
- Paternus of Auch (died c.150), Basque bishop
- Padarn Beisrudd (born c.300), Welsh for Paternus Redcoat, Romano-British commander in Scotland
- Padarn (died c.550), Welsh bishop

The Paterni were a prominent family in third century Rome.
