= Plague of Cyprian =

Pandemic in the Roman Empire (AD 249–262)

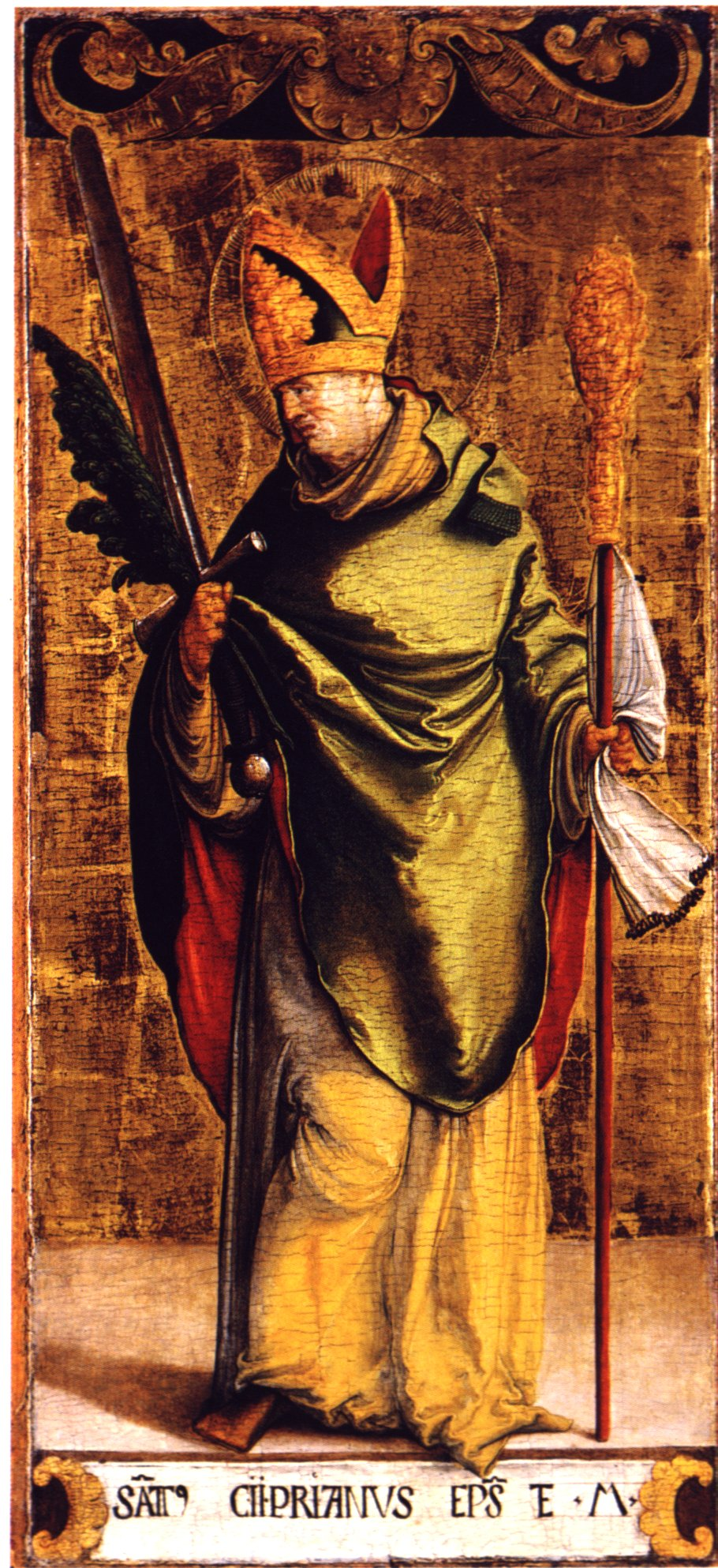
- 16th-century painting of Saint Cyprian, who documented the plague in his writings
- Disease: Unknown, possibly viral hemorrhagic fever, smallpox, or measles
- Pathogen: Unknown, possibly a filovirus
- Location: Roman Empire, Mediterranean basin
- Date: c. 250–270

The Plague of Cyprian was a pandemic which afflicted the Roman Empire from about AD 249 to 262, or 251/2 to 270. The plague is thought to have caused widespread manpower shortages for food production and the Roman army, severely weakening the empire during the Crisis of the Third Century. Its modern name refers to Cyprian (c. 210–258), a bishop of Carthage and early Christian writer who documented the plague in his treatise On the Plague. Its pathogen has not been identified; possibilities include smallpox, measles, and viral hemorrhagic fever (filoviruses like the Ebola virus). Cyprian noted that the plague attacked the "just and unjust" alike, and the response to it has strong ties to Christian beliefs and religion.

== Contemporary accounts ==
There are no accounts comprehensive enough to estimate the total number of deaths of the plague in the Roman Empire. At the height of the outbreak, 5,000 people a day were said to be dying in Rome. One historian has calculated the population of Alexandria dropped from 500,000 to 190,000 during the plague. Some of the decline in the city's population was possibly due to people fleeing. Pope Dionysus the Great of Alexandria wrote about the plague's effects there soon after the Decian persecution of 250 or Valerian persecutions of 257, as reported by Eusebius:

Now, alas! all is lamentation, everyone is mourning, and the city resounds with weeping because of the numbers who have died and are dying every day. As Scripture says of the firstborn of the Egyptians, so now there has been a great cry: there is not a house in which there is not one dead - how I wish it had been only one! (...) The most brilliant festival of all was kept by the fulfilled martyrs, who were feasted in heaven. Afterward came war and famine, which struck at Christian and heathen alike. We alone had to bear the injustices they did to us, but we profited by what they did to each other and suffered at each other's hands; so yet again we found joy in the peace which Christ has given to us alone. But when both we and they had been allowed a tiny breathing-space, out of the blue came this disease, a thing more terrifying to them than any terror, more frightful than any disaster whatever...

Cyprian's biographer, Pontius of Carthage, wrote of the plague at Carthage:

Afterwards there broke out a dreadful plague, and excessive destruction of a hateful disease invaded every house in succession of the trembling populace, carrying off day by day with abrupt attack numberless people, every one from his own house. All were shuddering, fleeing, shunning the contagion, impiously exposing their own friends, as if with the exclusion of the person who was sure to die of the plague, one could exclude death itself also. There lay about the meanwhile, over the whole city, no longer bodies, but the carcasses of many, and, by the contemplation of a lot which in their turn would be theirs, demanded the pity of the passers-by for themselves. No one regarded anything besides his cruel gains. No one trembled at the remembrance of a similar event. No one did to another what he himself wished to experience.

Some non-Christian Romans of the time may have blamed Christian impiety for the cause of the plague. Fifty years later, a North African convert to Christianity, Arnobius, defended his new religion from pagan allegations that neglect of the traditional gods had resulted in plague and other disasters:

[...] that a plague was brought upon the earth after the Christian religion came into the world, and after it revealed the mysteries of hidden truth? But pestilences, say my opponents, and droughts, wars, famines, locusts, mice, and hailstones, and other hurtful things, by which the property of men is assailed, the gods bring upon us, incensed as they are by your wrong-doings and by your transgressions.

Accounts of the plague date it about AD 251 to 262; however, there is controversy over when this disease began. One of the first appearances of this disease relies on the contents of two letters by Bishop Dionysius of Alexandria, pointing to the plague erupting around Easter of 249 AD in Egypt, quickly spreading across Europe, and reaching Rome by the second half of 251 at the latest. There was a later incident in 270 involving the death of Claudius II Gothicus, but it is unknown if this was the same plague or a different outbreak. According to the Historia Augusta, "in the consulship of Antiochianus and Orfitus the favour of heaven furthered Claudius' success. For a great multitude, survivors of the barbarian tribes, who had gathered in Haemimontum were so stricken with famine and pestilence that Claudius now scorned to conquer them further... during this same period the Scythians [Goths] attempted to plunder in Crete and Cyprus as well, but everywhere their armies were likewise stricken with pestilence and so were defeated". Archaeologists that worked in Thebes, Egypt, uncovered charred human remains leading them to believe that people were burning bodies during the plague.

Contemporary sources indicate the plague originated in Aethiopia, but treating Aethiopia as the source of contagious diseases goes at least as far back as Thucydides' account of the Plague of Athens. That the plague reached Alexandria at least one year before it reached Rome, however, is a mark in favour of an East African origin. Per Hubener, though, a trans-Danubian origin, depending on trade routes, would also allow for the plague to come to Alexandria before Rome.

== Symptoms ==
There were several symptoms frequently described by contemporaries. In his treatise De mortalitate ("On the Plague") Cyprian wrote on the horrors associated with the disease, and the symptoms experienced by victims, allowing researchers to find similarities to other diseases, narrowing down the options as to what this disease may have been. The symptoms included fever, continuous vomiting, deafness, blindness, diarrhea, and swollen throat. He also wrote that victims experienced conjunctivital bleeding (filling of blood in the eyes) as well as paralysis of the legs and feet. These symptoms resulted more often than not in the death of the victims.

Cyprian drew moralizing analogies in his sermons to the Christian community and drew a word picture of the plague's symptoms in his essay:

This trial, that now the bowels, relaxed into a constant flux, discharge the bodily strength; that a fire originated in the marrow ferments into wounds of the fauces; that the intestines are shaken with a continual vomiting; that the eyes are on fire with the injected blood; that in some cases the feet or some parts of the limbs are taken off by the contagion of diseased putrefaction; that from the weakness arising by the maiming and loss of the body, either the gait is enfeebled, or the hearing is obstructed, or the sight darkened;—is profitable as a proof of faith.

== Epidemiology ==
There is argument over the origins of the disease. The severe devastation to the European population from the two plagues may indicate that the population had no previous exposure or immunity to the plague's cause. The historian William Hardy McNeill asserts that both the earlier Antonine Plague (166–180) and the Plague of Cyprian (251–270) were the first transfers from animal hosts to humanity of two different diseases, one of smallpox and one of measles, but not necessarily in that order. Dionysios Stathakopoulos asserts that both outbreaks were of smallpox.

According to the historian Kyle Harper, the symptoms attributed by ancient sources to the Plague of Cyprian better match a viral disease causing a hemorrhagic fever, such as Ebola, rather than smallpox. (Conversely, Harper believes that the Antonine Plague was caused by smallpox.)

== Climate connections ==
According to 2024 research, major plagues that significantly impacted the Roman Empire, such as the Antonine Plague, the Plague of Cyprian, and the Plague of Justinian, are strongly linked to periods of cooler and drier climate conditions, indicating that colder weather may have contributed to the spread of these diseases during that time. It is thought climate stress interacted with social and biological variables, such as food availability, rodent populations, and human migration, making populations more susceptible to disease.

== Legacy ==
According to Harper, the plague nearly saw the end of the Roman Empire, and in the period between AD 248 and 268, Roman history becomes a puzzling tangle of brutal failures. The devastation within Rome was so intense that as it overcame the populations, the emperor Trebonianus Gallus and his son Volusianus gained popularity and support just for providing proper burials spaces for the plague victims, especially the poor and vulnerable. The structural integrity of Rome became questionable, as the collapse invited one candidate after another to try for legitimacy over the throne. Eventually, the empire fragmented and only the immense success of later emperors in the restructuring of the empire prevented this time from being the final period of Roman imperial history.

The Plague of Cyprian also gives way to many Christian beliefs, as most Christians believed that they suffered because they were fighting with the devil. While most people are curious by nature, this disease truly stumped the people of Rome. Cyprian urged the people to avoid fearing and wondering about the disease, and to remember that "there is hope in eternal life". The bishop also said to "bring yourselves to the sick and poor, and help them. God said love thy neighbor as I have loved you."

As the plague originated during the times of the early Church, both the threat of imminent death from the plague and the conviction among many of the Christian clergy in the face of it won many converts to that religion. The Church also promised an afterlife, a comfort to many sick and dying. Cyprian wrote of the passion of the faithful who had fallen ill in his treatise:

What a grandeur of spirit it is to struggle with all the powers of an unshaken mind against so many onsets of devastation and death! What sublimity to stand erect amid the desolation of the human race, and not to lie prostrate with those who have no hope in God; but rather to rejoice, and to embrace the benefit of the occasion; that in thus bravely showing forth our faith, and by suffering endured, going forward to Christ by the narrow way that Christ trod. We may receive the reward of His life and faith according to His own judgment!

== See also ==
- Disease in Imperial Rome
