= Domitian II =

Roman imperial usurper in c.271

- Usurper of the Gallic Empire
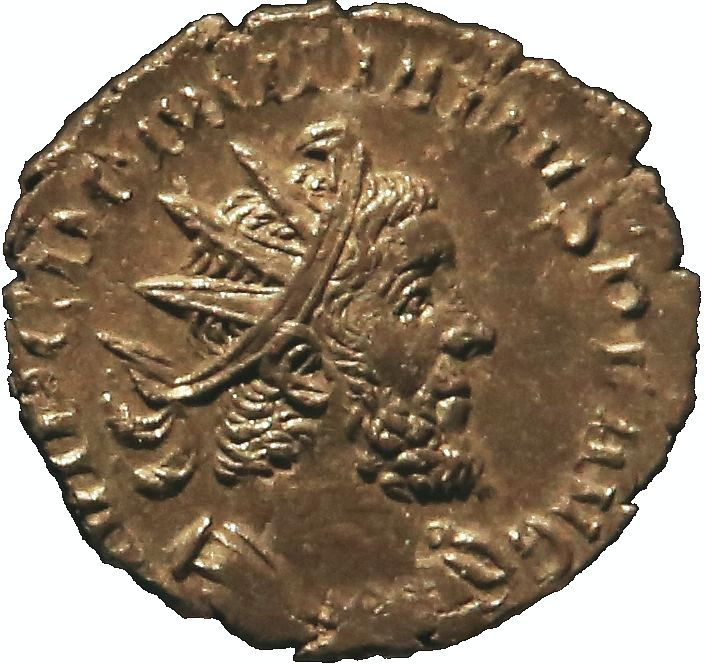
- Coin portrait of Domitian II, inscribed: imp·c·domitianus p·f· aug·
- Reign: c. 271
- Predecessor: Victorinus
- Successor: Tetricus I
- Died: c. 271
Names
- Domitianus (full name unknown)
Regnal name
- Imperator Caesar Domitianus Pius Felix Augustus

Domitian II (Latin: Domitianus) was a Roman soldier of the mid 3rd century who was acclaimed emperor, probably in northern Gaul in late 270 or early 271, and struck coins to advertise his elevation. It is now generally assumed that this man is to be equated with the Domitianus who is twice mentioned in the literary sources as a significant figure in the politics of the age, but on neither occasion as an outright contender for the Imperial throne.

Given that his reign lasted for, at best, a few weeks after his acclamation and he does not seem to have secured significant military or political support, Domitianus is more properly categorized as a Roman usurper rather than an emperor. His attempted coup should also be understood in the context of the troubled later history of the Gallic Empire rather than that of the Empire as a whole.

== Numismatic evidence ==
The only evidence for the existence and rule of an Imperial claimant named Domitianus derives from two coins. The first was part of a hoard discovered at Les Cléons, in the commune of Haute-Goulaine in the Loire-Atlantique department of France in 1900. The authenticity or significance of this coin was much debated and as late as 1992 Domitianus was widely considered "at best a conjectural figure". The other coin was found fused in a pot with some 5,000 other coins of the period 250–275 (thus providing incontrovertible provenance) in the village of Chalgrove in Oxfordshire, England, in 2003. The hoard was acquired by the Ashmolean Museum in 2004.

In 2006, an alleged third specimen of the same usurper was found in the Vidin Province in north-western Bulgaria (possibly Ratiaria) by an amateur archaeologist using a metal detector. This coin's identification is disputed, as although its obverse legend seemingly begins with DOM... and ends in ...AVG, its style is distinctly unlike the two other examples. It may instead be a barbarous radiate, as it is also significantly smaller and lighter (17mm and 1.53g) than the other examples.

The Bulgarian coin also depicts Laetitia on the reverse, unlike the other two examples which depict Concordia. The coin is stored at the Sofia National Museum of History (in the complex "Boyana"), under "Inv. No. 45197". It has not appeared in any academic publications besides those published in Bulgaria.

The design of the two genuine coins is typical of those associated with the Gallic Empire. They are of the radiate type, depicting Domitianus as a bearded figure and wearing a radiate crown representing the rays of the sun, in reference to Sol Invictus (i.e. the sun perceived as a deity lit. '"the Unconquered Sun"'). This depiction is very similar to that of the coins of the Gallic Emperors Victorinus (269–271) and Tetricus I (271–274).

Both coins bear the same legend, IMP C DOMITIANUS P F AUG, an abbreviation for Imperator Caesar Domitianus Pius Felix Augustus. An unusual feature here is the absence of any reference to Domitianus's nomen or praenomen. Gallic Empire coins usually bear the full tria nomina of the prince celebrated the better to carry out their propagandist function. On the reverse, the coins show Concordia, and have the legend CONCORDIA MILITVM, a propagandistic claim that the army was united behind Domitianus. Again this is a standard slogan for the Gallic Emperors.

Judging by their refined design, the coins were probably struck at the chief mint of the Gallic Empire – at Trier in the province of Gallia Belgica or Cologne in Germania Inferior – or, at least, from a die produced by artisans who were strongly influenced by those coins. It also suggests that the date of the coin was prior to 274 when the Emperor Aurelian suppressed the Gallic regime.

== Literary sources ==
There are only two literary references for Domitianus's existence, neither of which names him as an emperor:

- The 6th-century Byzantine historian Zosimus (1.49) records that a certain Domitianus was punished for a revolt during the reign of Aurelian (270–275). The text is vague as to the nature of his disloyalty and against whom it was directed. Because Zosimus places his coup in the reign of Aurelian and because he equates Domitianus with Septiminus (or Septimius) who was acclaimed Emperor by the Dalmatian garrison at about the same time it has usually been assumed that Domitianus was directly challenging Aurelian and that his revolt took place within the territory of the central Empire – those provinces not controlled by either the Gallic Emperors in the west or Zenobia's Palmyrene Empire in the east. (Watson suggests that his command lay somewhere southwest of Lake Geneva, in the frontier region between the Gallic Empire and the central Empire);
- The notoriously unreliable Historia Augusta (12.14) mentions a Domitianus as a general involved in the suppression of the revolt of Macrianus Major in 261. This text asserts that in this operation Domitianus was an associate (possibly, a cliens, client or protégé) of Gallienus's hipparchos (cavalry master general) Aureolus who is normally credited with the victory over Macrianus. However, the reference is made in terms that suggest that Domitianus was already a distinguished commander in his own right. There is nowhere in the text any suggestion that this Domitianus or any other man of that name was involved in any anti-regime activities during Aurelian's reign.

Historia Augusta also suggests that Domitianus was descendant of the Emperor Domitian, the son of Vespasian and his wife Domitilla the Elder. (Note: This may have been propaganda.) The intention here may be to suggest that Domitianus was of senatorial rank. It is possible that his motive in doing this was to deflect some of the glory accruing to the low-born Aureolus from his suppression of the Macrianic rebellion. The text's author cannot bring himself to say anything that might appear to denigrate the achievement of Aureolus in this connection in comparison to the supine effeminacy of his bête noire, the unworthy Gallienus. However, he was probably happy to be able suggest that his associate, Domitianus, was "one of us". One might remark that if Domitianus had been a senator he would probably have fallen foul of the decision taken by Gallienus early in his sole reign to strip all aristocratic army officers of their commissions. He would not, therefore, have been allowed to command the forces sent against the Macriani.

== Suggested interpretation ==
The evidence is not sufficient to confirm that the associate or protégé of Aureolus mentioned in the HA, the obscure rebel of Aurelian's reign mentioned by Zosimus and the Imperial claimant celebrated in the coins were one and the same man. However, academic opinion is inclined to the view that, more likely than not, they were one and the same.

It is quite possible that, as a client of Aureolus, Domitianus would later have become associated with the Gallic regime given what is suspected and known about his patron's relations with Postumus. If Historia Augusta’s assertions as to his military reputation are correct it is not unlikely that he would have been welcomed into the entourage of the Gallic Emperor and his successors. However, the evidence is too vague and circumstantial.

The evidence of his coins suggests that the Domitianus was almost certainly a military figure associated with the rebel Gallic Empire who commanded troops close enough to one of the mint cities of Trier or Cologne to ensure that his Imperial pretensions were proclaimed in the traditional manner. It was very difficult for would-be Emperors in regions where there was no established mint to issue coins. (Note: So far as is known Domitianus's contemporary Septiminus in Dalmatia did not issue coins (having no mint) and the Illyrian rebel, Ingenuus, had similarly failed twenty years before because Gallienus had removed his mint when he transferred his main theatre of operations in the defence of the west from the Danube to the Rhine. Regalianus too had only produced limited editions of overstrikes even though he survived for some considerable time after making his bid for power in 260.)

Given what is known of the chronology of the Gallic Empire his bid for Empire is most probably associated with the period of confusion following the officers’ coup against the Gallic Emperor Victorinus early in 271. The men who murdered Victorinus seem to have had no political agenda and it is not surprising that there should have been period of confusion after his death. In this circumstance it would not have been surprising that a faction may have been tempted to put forward a figure such as Domitianus who had an established military reputation – particularly if he was, indeed, the same man as the conqueror of the Macriani mentioned in Historia Augusta. On the other hand, the literary evidence does suggest that the forces favouring Tetricus I as the new Emperor were able to assert themselves so swiftly and decisively that Domitianus's elevation was hardly remarked outside the provinces controlled by the Gallic Empire.

The most likely interpretation of the evidence of the coins is that Domitianus was involved in the officers' coup that overthrew Victorinus and managed to secure temporary control of one of the Gallic mints. It is thus more likely that he was suppressed by Tetricus I than by the central Roman Emperor Aurelian as the Zosimus reference would appear to suggest.

The use of the cognomen alone in the Imperial title is sufficiently unusual to raise questions about the circumstances in which the coins were produced. The circumstances in which the Chalgrove specimen was discovered leaves no doubt that it was, indeed, struck by somebody in the early 270s, but we have to consider that it might have been produced by a faction of the Rhine army officer cadre which hoped to use Domitianus as a figurehead, possibly without his knowledge or approval.

Domitianus's fate is unknown. One possibility is that he was either executed by Tetricus or, more likely, that he was murdered by his own troops when the main Rhine army garrisons declared for Tetricus. A second possibility is that he was defeated by Placidianus, a general loyal to Aurelian who had been stationed to guard the lower Rhône valley during Victorinus' assault on Autun in 270. This would suggest that his rebellion took place in southern Gaul, near enough to the central empire's provinces to be of concern to Aurelian. John F. White proposed possibly identifying him with a nephew mentioned by Eutropius as having been killed by Aurelian. Domitianus then being the son of a sister of Aurelian (full name Lucius Domitius Aurelianus) named Domitia.
