= Victorinus =

Roman emperor in Gaul from 268/269 to 270/271

- Augustus of Gaul and Britannia
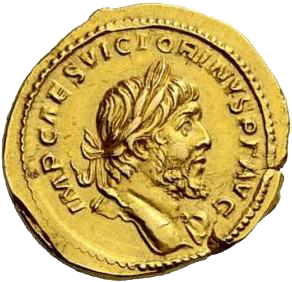
- Aureus of Victorinus, marked: imp·caes·victorinus p·f· aug

Emperor of the Gallic Empire
- Reign: 268–270 or 269–271
- Predecessor: Marcus Aurelius Marius
- Successor: Tetricus I
- Born: 3rd Century; Roman Gaul
- Died: 270 or early 271; Colonia Claudia Ara Agrippinensium (Cologne)
- Issue: Victorinus Junior (fictional)
Names
- Marcus Piavonius Victorinus
Regnal name
- Imperator Caesar Marcus Piavonius Victorinus Augustus
- Mother: Victoria

Marcus Piavonius Victorinus (Note: Some of the inscriptions record his name as M. Piavvonius Victorinus, as does the first release of coins from the Colonia mint. A mosaic from Augusta Treverorum (Trier) lists him as Piaonius.) was emperor in the Gallic provinces from 268 to 270 or 269 to 271, following the brief reign of Marius. He was murdered by a jealous husband whose wife he had tried to seduce.

== Reign ==
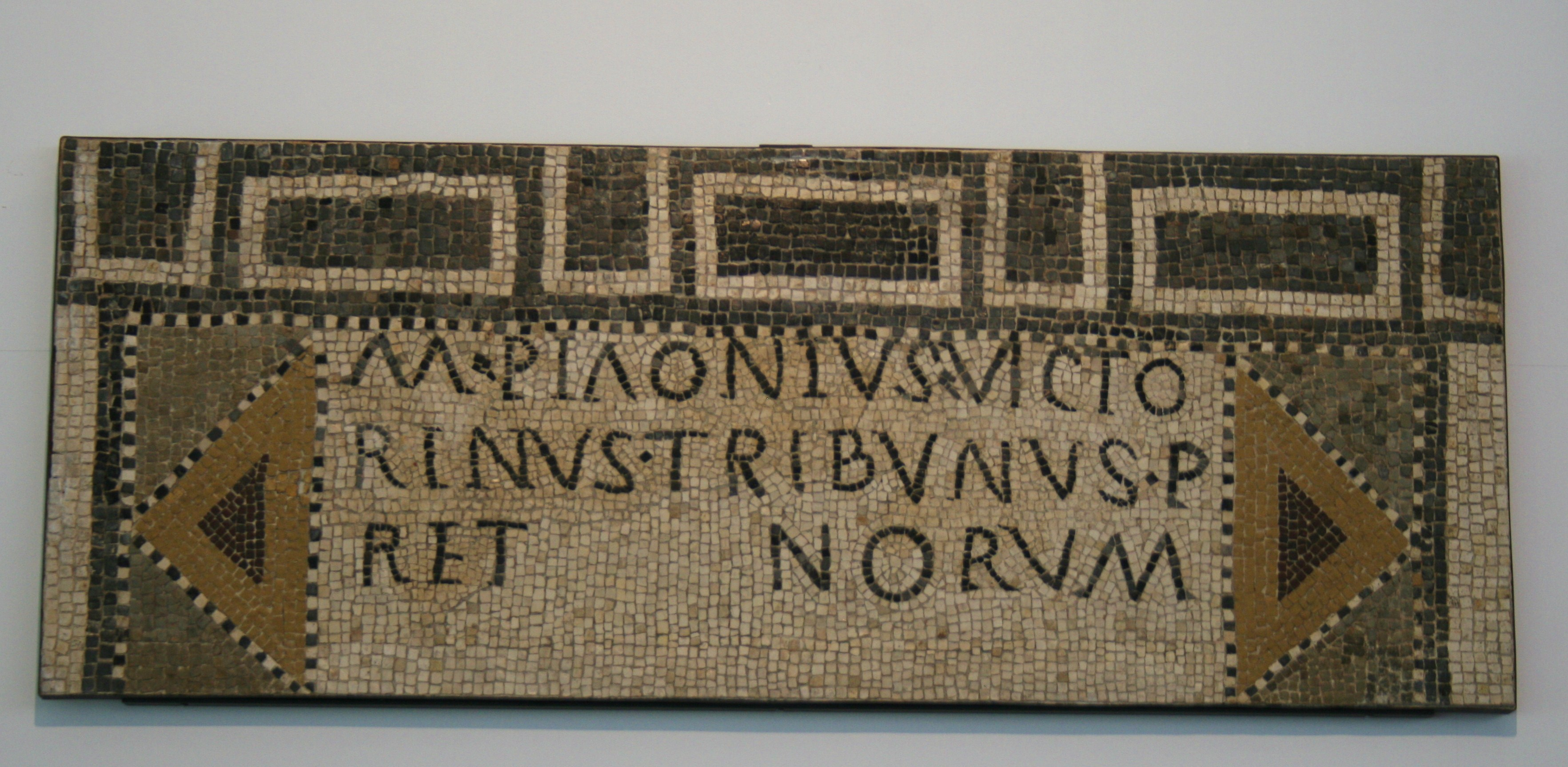
Mosaic with the name of Victorinus from Augusta Treverorum (CIL XIII, 03679 (4, p 43); Rheinisches Landesmuseum Trier)

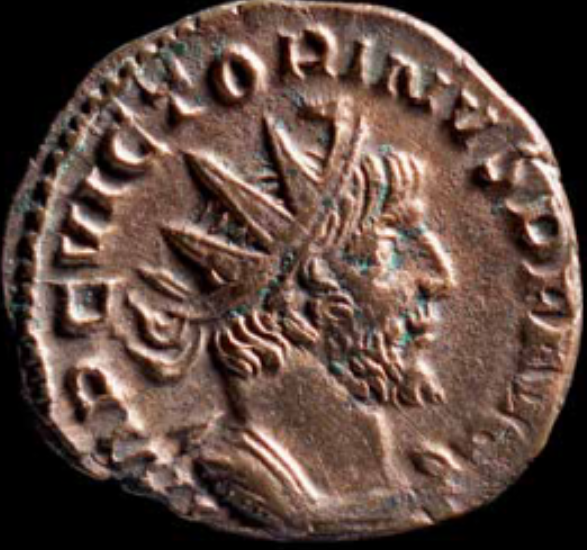
Bronze double denarius of the Gallic Roman emperor Victorinus (269–271) found at U Thong, Thailand and later donated to the U Thong National Museum.

Hailing from Gaul, Victorinus was born into a Gallic family of great wealth, and was a soldier under Postumus, the first of the so-called Gallic emperors. He showed considerable ability, as he held the title of tribunus praetorianorum (tribune of the praetorians) in 266/267, and rose swiftly to become co-consul with Postumus in 268. It is also possible that Postumus then elevated him to the post of praetorian prefect. Shortly after putting down a rebellion by Laelianus in 269, Postumus was murdered by his own troops, who appointed Marius as emperor in his place.

After engineering the death of Marius, Victorinus was declared emperor by the troops located at Augusta Treverorum (Trier) in the fall of 269. His principal concern was to prevent the western provinces from submitting to the central authority of the Roman Empire, a fact made clear to him from the first few weeks when only the provinces of Gaul, Germania and Britain recognised him. Hispania deserted the Gallic Empire and declared its loyalty to Claudius Gothicus. Claudius then sent his trusted general Placidianus to south-east Gaul with instructions to bring over as many of the wavering cities as he could. Very quickly Placidianus captured Cularo (Grenoble), but did not proceed any further.

The presence of Placidianus inspired the city of Augustodunum Haeduorum (Autun) to abandon Victorinus and declare its intention to declare for Claudius Gothicus. This forced Victorinus to march south and besiege it, where it fell after seven months, after which Victorinus’ troops plundered and destroyed the city. Victorinus returned to Colonia Claudia Ara Agrippinensium (Cologne) in triumph. It remains a mystery just why Claudius did not authorise Placidianus to go to the relief of Augustodunum; however, it is speculated that Claudius, who was fully engaged either in Italy against the Alamanni or in the Balkans against the Goths, did not wish to open a second theatre of operations in Gaul, which would not only have involved a major military effort, but would also have required Claudius to assume responsibility for the defense of the Rhine frontier had he been successful. There is evidence to suggest that Claudius was having some difficulties in the East, which also occupied his attention.

Victorinus was murdered at Colonia in early 271 by Attitianus, one of his officers, whose wife Victorinus had supposedly seduced. Since the motive was personal and not political, Victorinus' mother, Victoria (or Vitruvia), was able to continue to hold power after the death of Victorinus and she arranged for his deification and, after considerable payment to the troops, the appointment of Tetricus I as his successor. Another military commander appears to have been proclaimed as the emperor Domitianus II, but was soon eliminated.

Victorinus is listed among the Thirty Tyrants in the Historia Augusta. The dubious Historia Augusta equally has a short description of Victorinus Junior, allegedly the son of Victorinus, who was appointed emperor by his family the day his father was murdered, and would have been killed immediately afterwards by the troops. The Historia Augusta also says that both father and son were buried near Colonia Claudia Ara Agrippinensium in marble tombs.

== Sources ==
=== Primary sources ===
- Aurelius Victor, Epitome de Caesaribus
- Aurelius Victor, Liber de Caesaribus
- Eutropius, Brevarium, Book 9
- Historia Augusta, The Thirty Tyrants

=== Secondary sources ===
- Southern, Pat (2001). The Roman Empire from Severus to Constantine. Routledge.
- Potter, David Stone (2004). The Roman Empire at Bay, AD 180-395. Routledge.
- Jones, A.H.M.; Martindale, J.R. (1971). The Prosopography of the Later Roman Empire, Vol. I: AD260-395. Cambridge University Press.
- Polfer, Michel (1999). "Victorinus (A.D. 269-271)". De Imperatoribus Romanis. Archived from the original on 2023-05-28.
- J. F. Drinkwater, The Gallic Empire: Separatism and Continuity in the North-western Provinces of the Roman Empire A.D. 260–274 (Stuttgart 1987)
- Richard Abdy, "The Domitian II coin from Chalgrove: a Gallic emperor returns to history". Antiquity. 83 (321), 2009: 751–757.

Regnal titles
Preceded by Marcus Aurelius Marius	Emperor of the Gallic Empire; 269-271	Succeeded by Domitianus and/or Tetricus I
Political offices
Preceded by Gallienus, Sabinillus	Consul of the Roman Empire; 268 with Postumus, Ovinius Paternus, Arcesilaus	Succeeded by Aspasius Paternus, Publius Licinius Egnatius Marinianus, Postumus
Preceded by Aspasius Paternus, Publius Licinius Egnatius Marinianus, Postumus	Consul of the Roman Empire; 269-270 with Sanctus, Claudius II, Paternus	Succeeded by Aurelian, Pomponius Bassus, Tetricus I
