= Troketta =

Town of ancient Lydia

Coordinates: 38°27′46″N 27°45′12″E

Troketta was a town of ancient Lydia, inhabited during Roman times. Its site is located near Turgutlu in Asiatic Turkey.

Kaisareia Troketta is known from an inscription, dating to the time of the Antonine Plague (second half of the 2nd century CE), which records a response from the god Apollo prescribing a ritual purification to ward off the destructive effects of the demon Loimos. The oracle instructs the inhabitants to carry out a purification rite by sprinkling water drawn from seven springs upon their homes, followed by unspecified sacrifices (kállima) and the dedication of a statue to Apollo.
