= Paternus (consul 269) =

Roman statesman and consul in 269

Paternus was a Roman statesman who served as Consul in 269.

== Bibliography ==
- CIL III, 4289

Preceded by Aspasius Paternus, Publius Licinius Egnatius Marinianus, Claudius Gothicus	Consul of the Roman Empire; 269 with Claudius Gothicus, Victorinus, Sanctus	Succeeded by Flavius Antiochianus, Virius Orfitus, Victorinus
