= Disease in Imperial Rome =

Overview of diseases in Imperial Rome

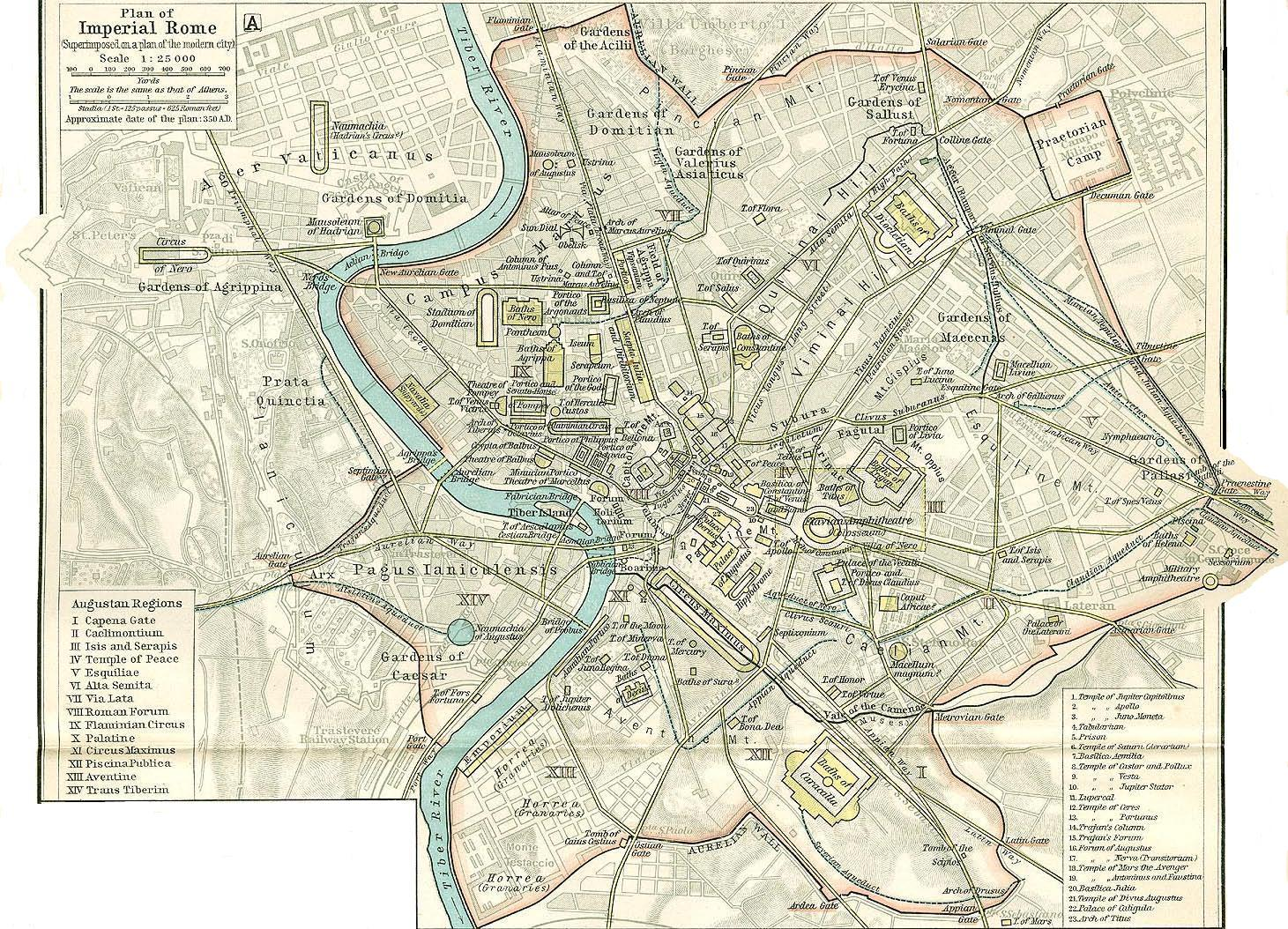
Map of Imperial Rome in 350 AD

During the imperial period of Rome, disease was a devastating aspect of life. As the borders of the empire continuously expanded and the population steadily grew, cities in the Roman Empire were exposed to a multitude of diseases. There were a variety of potential causes of these diseases present in the highly dense and quickly growing society's way of living. The sewage systems, the public bathing houses, and the diet of citizens in Imperial Rome all contributed to the spread of disease.

Environmental problems also played a part. For instance, deforestation led to a higher rate of transmission due to a chain reaction in the marshes from the rising water table that stemmed from deforestation. The diseases ranged in severity, some being catastrophic and others being not quite as deadly. One of the most prominent plagues during this period was the Antonine Plague (165–180 AD). The people of Imperial Rome often had a very small amount of insight regarding the diseases that were overtaking their society. All of the information was known by a few prominent physicians that came up with the treatments, which were usually not very effective.

== Causes ==
=== Hygiene ===
==== Roman sewage and aqueduct systems ====
The Roman Empire has garnered itself a mostly positive reputation for the complicated sewer systems that ran underneath many of its cities. Roman engineering brought water to the city from the Alban Hills using an aqueduct system implemented in 312 BC. Although primitive forms of sewage systems have existed in Rome since pre-imperial times, these were mostly primitive drains that led to the nearby rivers and streams. Another source of water that proved to be dangerous was the Tiber River, which the Roman Army drank from, contributing to their vulnerability to many diseases. As the skills of engineers continued to grow, the complexity of the sewers did as well. For example, the Cloaca Maxima was one of the first complex and expansive sewer systems that ran under Rome. The aqueduct systems had an extremely complex design and for the most part succeeded in providing Romans with adequate amounts of relatively clean water for consumption and bathing.

While the sewage systems of Imperial Rome may have been engineering marvels and set precedents, there were still major flaws in Roman sewer systems. The population of Rome and other cities in the empire steadily grew, increasing the strain on the waste systems. However, due to the public health laws concerning street disposal of public waste, most of the large outbreaks and public health crises cannot be directly attributed to the sewer systems of Rome. There were many other more serious factors that added to the catastrophe of the major public health crises of Imperial Rome. Since most sewer systems were privately owned, they were privately maintained, and in turn neglected. Instead, citizens would turn to their latrines; if they lived on anything but the ground floor they would even throw their excrement onto the street. This led to sewage being exposed to flies, dogs, and bacteria, all of which helped spread disease among Romans. Although it is unclear what specific diseases were caused by the toilets in Imperial Rome due to the lack of clarification in ancient texts during that time period, it is likely that a multitude of intestinal diseases would have been caused through the lack of sanitation. Some examples of waterborne diseases include dysentery, typhoid fever, and other types of diarrhea. Another infamous hazard to health was the lead piping used to transport water throughout the city. Modern science has proven the deleterious effects of lead, especially in regard to fertility. Some experts believe this may have been a leading factor in the population decline in the latter Imperial period. In fact, a study by Dr. Arthur Aufderheide of the University of Minnesota revealed that "Imperial age populations demonstrated up to ten-fold more bone lead than their predecessors or successors."

==== Alcohol consumption ====
Studies indicate that lead was very prominent in Roman beverages. This is mostly due to the lead-based storage containers that were popular during the time. Some scholars speculate that the levels of alcohol consumed on a daily basis were more to blame for the health ailments of the aristocrats of Rome, with the average consumption rate being approximately 3 bottles of wine a day. The practice of diluting wine was common as the source mentions, and that undiluted wine was considered barbaric. In fact, the Romans would typically mix one part wine to two parts of water. It was also common practice to warm wine or reduce its sweetness through the use of sea water.

==== Litter pollution ====
The city of Rome also faced a major problem with street garbage and the build up of trash. Poets and satirists often made the Roman litter problem the subject of jokes and writings, with descriptions of trash being everywhere, including in Roman households and on the floor. The lack of sanitation on the streets and households of Rome contributed to disease and sickness. Trash items ranged from discarded household items to actual human waste, meaning contamination chances were very high. The Romans realized this was becoming a problem, and a series of laws and other measures were taken to limit garbage build up in the streets. Most of these measures were implemented in order to prevent pedestrian casualties from waste falling on them, however these measure also increased the public health by eliminating the waste from the immediate city. There is evidence to suggest that they allowed waste carriages to go throughout the city and collect waste during hours in which other modes of transportation were banned. This strategy did not completely solve the problem, as most of the waste was just moved outside the city limits meaning the risk for contamination and odor was still present.

==== Bathing ====
Public and private bath houses were common in Rome during the Imperial period of Rome. Commonly referred to as Thermae, these bath houses varied widely, but most had similar bathing processes. Occupants would exercise, use a variety of saunas and cooling rooms, and sometimes swim in a pool. Even an imperial-version sauna was created for cleansing the body of toxins. The hours typically started at lunchtime and closed at dusk and was open to everyone, with only a small fee required to enter. Bath houses were typically located near the forum of Roman towns. Due to the high poverty rate in Rome, it was uncommon for the middle class citizens to own a private bath, according to journalist Jay Stuller. The heated bath water was not always chemically cleansed or filtered with chemicals such as chlorine, causing bacteria to thrive and spread. When Christianity came to Rome, it viewed the public nudity of the bathing system as debauchery and therefore it became frowned upon. While the bathing system may not have been pristine, abstaining from cleanliness altogether brought upon many more potentially fatal diseases, especially in infants.

=== Environment ===
==== Population density ====
Rome's population was unprecedentedly large in the ancient world, reaching 1 million during the high point of the Empire. This was much larger than the other major cultures that co-existed and predated the Romans. Paired with the poor living conditions that many Romans experienced, the city was a perfect breeding ground for disease. In the poorer boroughs of Rome, tight living conditions and filth increased the spread of disease. The Antonine and Cyprian plagues were transmitted through touch, which only added to the severity of the plagues, especially in areas of poverty.

Rome had an extremely high population, and remnants of buildings suggest the average living space was very small. Many people crammed into small spaces led to very high rates of infection for transmittable diseases. As the Antonine and Cyprian plagues were transmitted through touch, a dense population rate would contribute highly to their spread.

==== Deforestation ====
Deforestation of Rome's cities, particularly near the Tiber River, led to higher disease rates. The causality is as follows: deforestation lead to a rising water table, which increased marshes. This increased the larva in Rome, and in turn increased disease borne from blood-sucking insects. Mosquitoes and other vectors were carriers of various diseases, such as malaria.

==== Air pollution ====
The air in Rome was undoubtedly polluted, with many sources remarking on the odours that could be found walking around the city. There were multiple sources of Rome's air pollution, open fires and human waste just being some of it. This degree of waste also attracted rodents and pests of all natures, only adding to the number of concerns for public health. It wasn't until the rule of Emperor Domitian that air pollution was attempted to be taken care of within the city. Laws were passed with the threat of fines and regulations that helped to attempt and clean the air.

== Diseases ==
In Imperial Rome, influenza, colds, and other ailments were just as apparent, if not more, compared to ailments in modern day Rome. Imperial Rome had many noteworthy diseases, ranging from sexually transmitted diseases to catastrophic plagues. This range indicates significant differences in the severity of the ailments present in Imperial Rome. As said by the Roman physician Galen, "This populous city, where daily ten thousand people can be discovered suffering from jaundice, and ten thousand from dropsy."

=== Plagues ===
==== The Antonine Plague ====
The Antonine Plague was the first known pandemic impacting the Roman Empire. The plague, generally believed to be smallpox, was possibly brought by soldiers returning from the campaign in Western Asia, leading to catastrophic results for the Roman populace, who had likely never been exposed to the disease before. The main symptoms included diarrhea, skin sores and irritations and sore throats. Symptoms lasted for around two weeks before they either died, or recovered and in turn developed immunity from further infection. Emperor Marcus Aurelius implemented several changes which suggest the dire status of the Empire. This included loosening the regulations for membership of higher councils in multiple important settlements throughout the empire, including Athens. Egypt was another region that saw catastrophic loss in the populations of their cities. This was demonstrated in the papyrus scripts documenting the loss in revenue from the massive decrease in population. The entire empire was facing hardship from the plague. Public building projects ceased in many of the provinces' major cities, including London. This all simultaneously happened while the empire faced attacks from the Sarmatians in the east. It is estimated that up to 15% of the Roman population was wiped out during the ten year plague, including Emperor Marcus Aurelius in 180 AD. It is widely believed that the plague was what is now known as smallpox. This can be determined largely due to the notes and commentary from famed Greek physician Galen. It is estimated that the Antonine Plague's impact on the Roman Empire was devastating and the effects lasted for centuries after the fact, some historians arguing that it permanently impaired the Empire and assisted in its downfall.

The Antonine Plague was named after the emperor whose reign it originated in, Aurelius Antoninus, according to Louise Cilliers and Francis Retief. Historical sources suggest that Roman soldiers returning from campaign in Mesopotamia spread the disease, which lasted from 165 to 180 AD. Based on the written observations of fever, diarrhea, and boils by the Greek physician Galen, historians infer that smallpox caused the plague. Including substantial army deaths, the outbreaks decimated an estimated two thirds of the Roman population, killing roughly 2000 people per day.

==== The Plague of Cyprian ====
The Plague of Cyprian (249–262 AD) caused widespread shortages across the empire, and was one of the major contributing factors to the Crisis of the Third Century. Due to a lack of sources, the nature of the causative agent of the plague is speculative with smallpox, measles, zoonotic influenza or viral hemorrhagic fever having all been suggested. Its name commemorates Cyprian, the bishop of Carthage, an early Christian writer who witnessed and described the plague. While the original origin of the plague is unknown, it possibly entered the Roman Empire via Gothic invasions on the Danube rather than traveling up the Nile from inner Africa. Although no exact figures are known, the death toll was large, with estimates that the population of Alexandria alone dropped from 500,000 to 190,000 during the plague.

=== Blood-borne diseases ===
==== Morbus Gallicus ====
Morbus Gallicus (Gallic disease), better known in modern times as syphilis, or the "French Disease", was not prominent in ancient Europe but with recent bone studies, it has been found that a type of European treponematosis bacterium may have even affected children. However, according to an article published by Kristin Harper in 2008, ancient European civilizations may have had a related form of the bacterium but not venereal syphilis itself, which may have had its origin in the pre-Columbian Americas. The term ‘syphilis" was coined later on by a 15th-century Italian poet Girolamo Fracastoro, who wrote an epic poem of a boy named Syphilus who insulted Apollo, and was in turn punished with the disease. During the Medieval and Renaissance periods the likely mutated forms of the treponematoses resulted in epidemics.

==== Malaria ====
The earliest known case of malaria is from Roman DNA dated to 450 AD. An excavation of a village shows signs of a serious malaria problem, with bone tests and traces of honeysuckle, a plant used to treat fevers. Also noted is that the area was a "zone of pestilence". Deforestation and sanitation issues were the main causes of malaria.

==== Mentagra ====
Mentagra, notably thought by the Imperial Romans to be spread by kissing, was a skin disease most commonly starting in the chin and moving on to the entire face and sometimes other body parts. The aesthetic factor was very unappealing, while the disease was hardly adverse to health at all. Even though it was not dangerous, Romans ironically went as far as scar-inducing cauterizations to rid them of the abhorrent disease.

=== Respiratory diseases ===
Respiratory diseases, most prominently anthracosis, were common due to pollution in Roman homes according to Professor Luigi Capasso. Carbon was constantly produced with their lamps, cooking, and fireplaces. The carbon produced lesions on their lungs, apparent in bone studies (made possible by the well-preserved bodies stored under the remnants of a volcanic eruption of Vesuvius) and even a study on a Roman mummy.

== Relevant study ==
An extensive study done by Mario Novak and Mario Slaus found many skeletal remains available for examination in one specific colony in ancient Rome, Colonia Iulia Iader also known as Zadar. With tests it was found that the mean age of death for men was 37.4 years (with a standard deviation of 9.43 years), and for women was 38.4 years (with a standard deviation of 9.29 years). While this is only a sample representation of our study population, it could give reasonable insights to the whole of Rome. In the remains, several indicators of nutritional stress were found widespread among certain age groups. With the rates of these nutritional problems, it was even found that Romans favored male children in things like breastfeeding, leaving the females with higher rates of malnutrition. Periostitis was also found in many samples, with a frequency indicating overcrowding and overall poor quality of life.

== Treatment ==
Rome had a few prominent physicians in its Imperial era who came up with treatment for various diseases, and were generally the only source of medicinal information. Although there was a large amount of information known about human anatomy, many of the cures and medicines were extremely ineffective.

=== Doctors ===
The highly experienced medical personnel were focused on the military, which was often the most vulnerable group to any given disease. Dioscorides served under Emperor Nero, experimenting with surgical techniques and medicinal herbs. Pliny the Elder also had a strong focus on botany, well known for his herbal knowledge. Each specialist had different methods and the ways of treating diseases was very varied, causing most treatments to be extremely useless due to the lack of consistency.

==== Galen ====
Galen, perhaps the most prominent Roman physician, studied anatomy as well as herbal remedies. Galen's contributions to medicine mainly consisted of his detailed book series that aided in future doctors' studies of practical medicine. As far as his contribution to medicine in the ancient world, he expanded the knowledge of medicine through using similar methods to Hippocrates, which strayed away from the mythical methods of medicine that proved to be ineffective. These methods that he practiced included studying anatomy and using many different procedures in an attempt to find reliable ways of treatment.

=== Treatment methods ===
==== Herbal medicines ====
Natural medicine was of great importance, seeing as they could not synthetically manufacture anything. Many traces of herbs at ancient Roman army bases have been found, as well as medicated wine. An example of these kind of medicine is green jasper, which was used to treat stomach problems. Army doctors had knowledge of the herbs, and perhaps even grew their own in their respective gardens. The Romans were not correct with all of the herbs uses, but a placebo effect possibly still made some of the herbs useful. Pills, also referred to as pastille, consisted of herbs and plants along with a metallic ingredient.

==== Surgery ====
Surgery was not a very common practice during the period of Imperial Rome and was only used as a last option and if absolutely needed. The reason for this was due to the risk of the patient being in more pain post-surgery than they were prior to it. Even when performed, it was confined to only surface level procedures, using flax, linen threads, or metal pins. Regarding internal damage that can be caused by diseases, many doctors did not attempt to fix this due to the fear of their medical reputation being damaged if unsuccessful, which was likely to occur due to the lack of knowledge regarding these procedures.
