= Barbarous radiate =

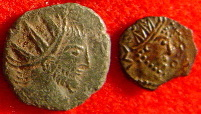

Barbarous radiates are imitations of the antoninianus, a type of coin issued during the Roman Empire, which are so named due to their crude style and prominent radiant crown worn by the emperor.

Barbarous radiates were issued privately, primarily during the Crisis of the Third Century (c. 259–274 AD) in the western provinces. They are not generally regarded as forgeries, since they were rarely deceptive because they were smaller and cruder than standard issues. They probably functioned as small change.

Although earlier numismatists, notably Philip V. Hill, theorized that barbarous radiates were produced long after their prototypes and into the Dark Ages and Saxon period, more recent works argue that they were generally contemporary to their prototypes.

According to Hill, in England, although barbarous radiates were clearly produced at several locations, hoard evidence demonstrate local styles. For example, in northern England there was a greater affinity towards producing barbarous radiates with reverse figures with relief-less outlines, while in southern England bolder, fuller, high relief figures were more common. Similar "schools of art" exist for pieces produced in continental Europe.

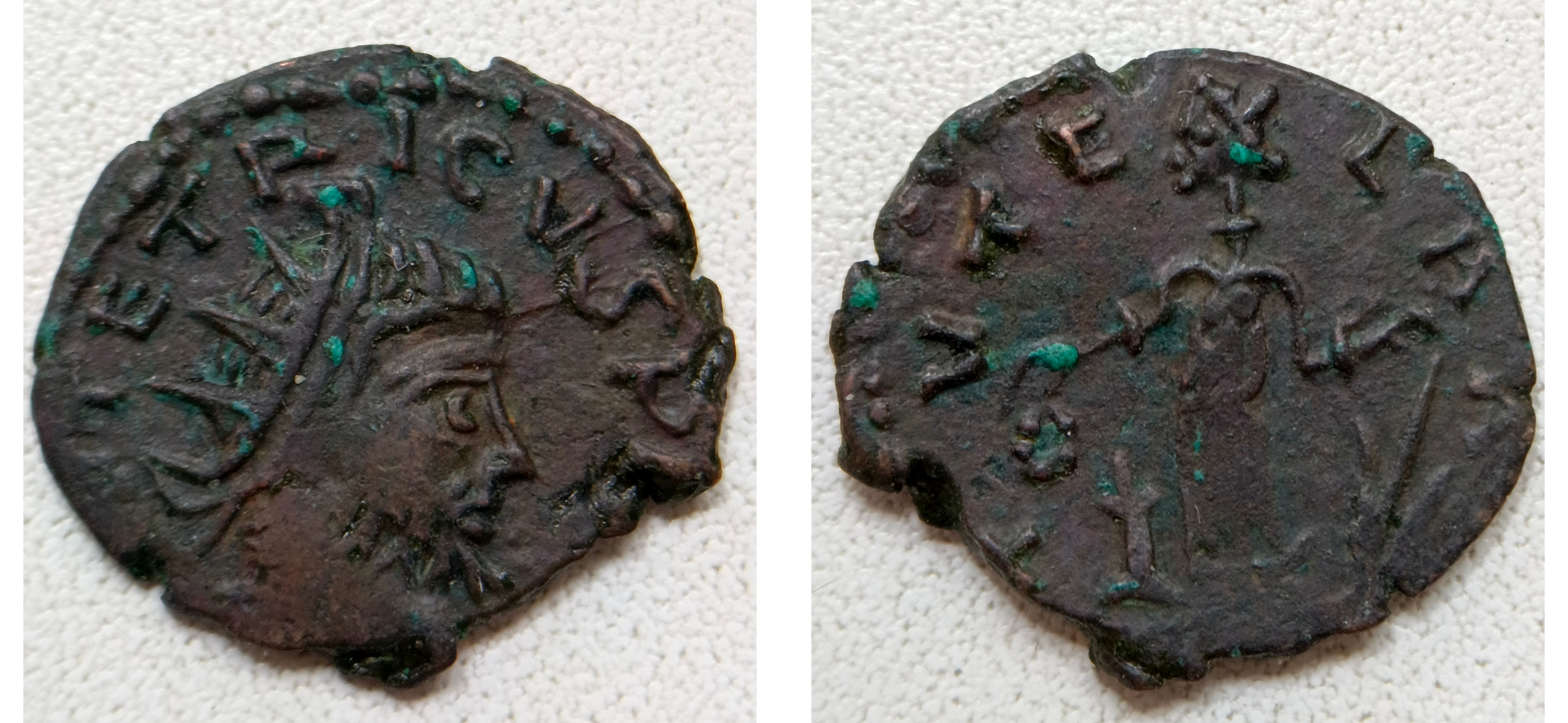
Barbarous radiate of Tetricus I with a reverse legend error: TVTELA AVG instead LAETITIA AVG.

Due to their unofficial manufacture, barbarous radiates exhibit many peculiarities. Reverse types portray a certain deity or personification, for example Spes, might feature a reverse legend instead for Pietas. On some specimens, the devices normally associated with one deity or personification is shown with a different deity or personification. For example, the sceptre, which is normally a device of Pax, is instead shown with Pietas. The result is a generic reverse personification or deity.

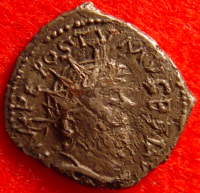
Barbarous radiate of Postumus

Legends of barbarous radiates range from correct and exact copies of the prototype, to a jumble of unintelligible, meaningless letters and symbols. Smaller pieces known as minims, which are less than 10 mm in diameter, are often anepigraphic (without markings/lettering). For very degraded barbarous imitations, there is a tendency to emphasize a particular feature of the prototype, in this case the radiate crown.

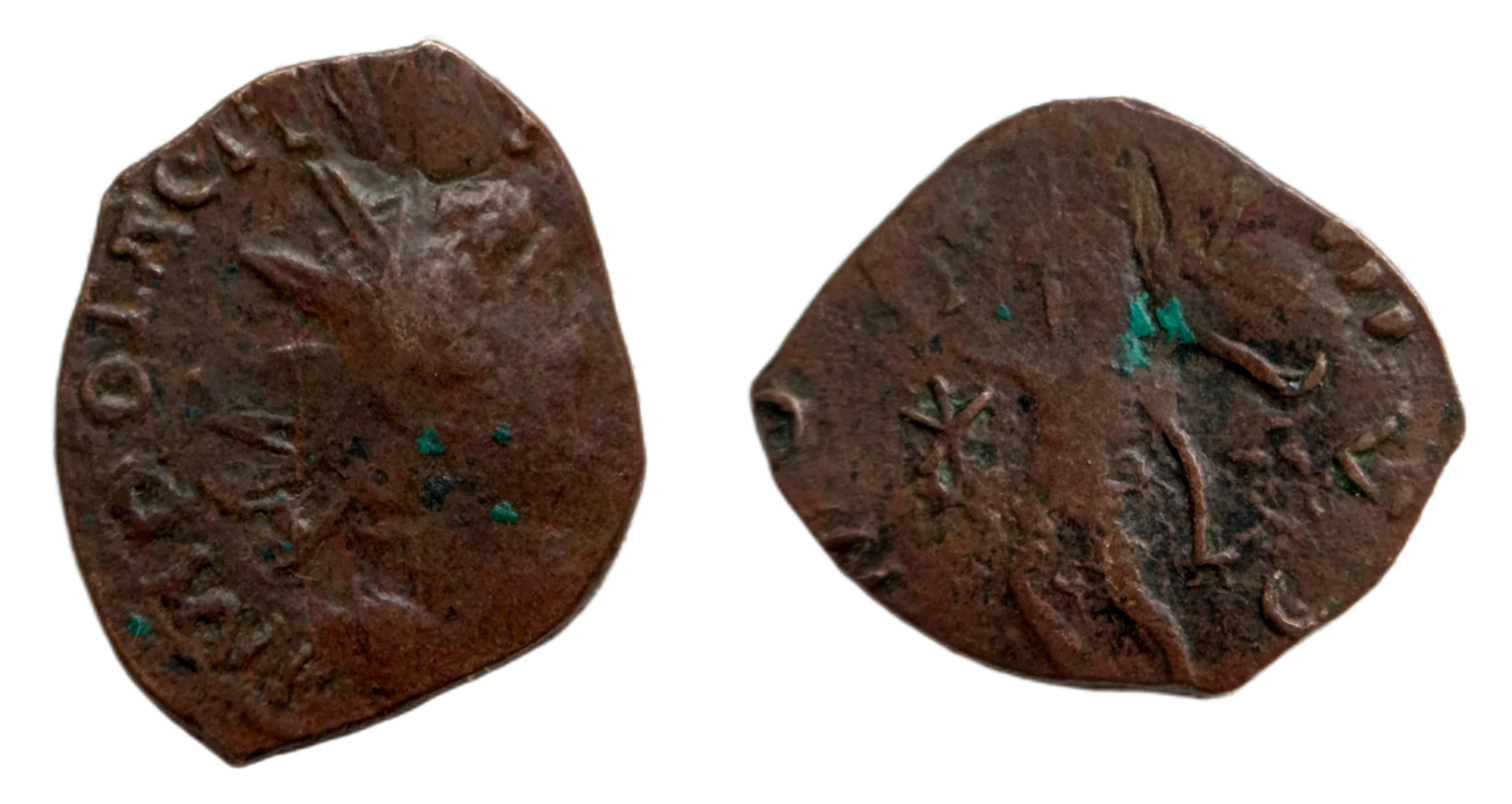
Barbarous radiate of Tacitus.

The most frequently imitated prototypes are of the Gallic emperors the Tetrici (270–273), Tetricus I and his son, Tetricus II. The next most frequent are those of Claudius II (270), especially the posthumous issue with the altar reverse, and Victorinus (268-270). Imitations of Postumus antoniniani are scarce, although imitations of his large bronzes (such as the double sestertius) are relatively common. Other uncommon to rare types in order of frequency are Gallienus, Quintillus, Probus, Aurelian, and Tacitus.
