= Claudius Gothicus =

Roman emperor from 268 to 270

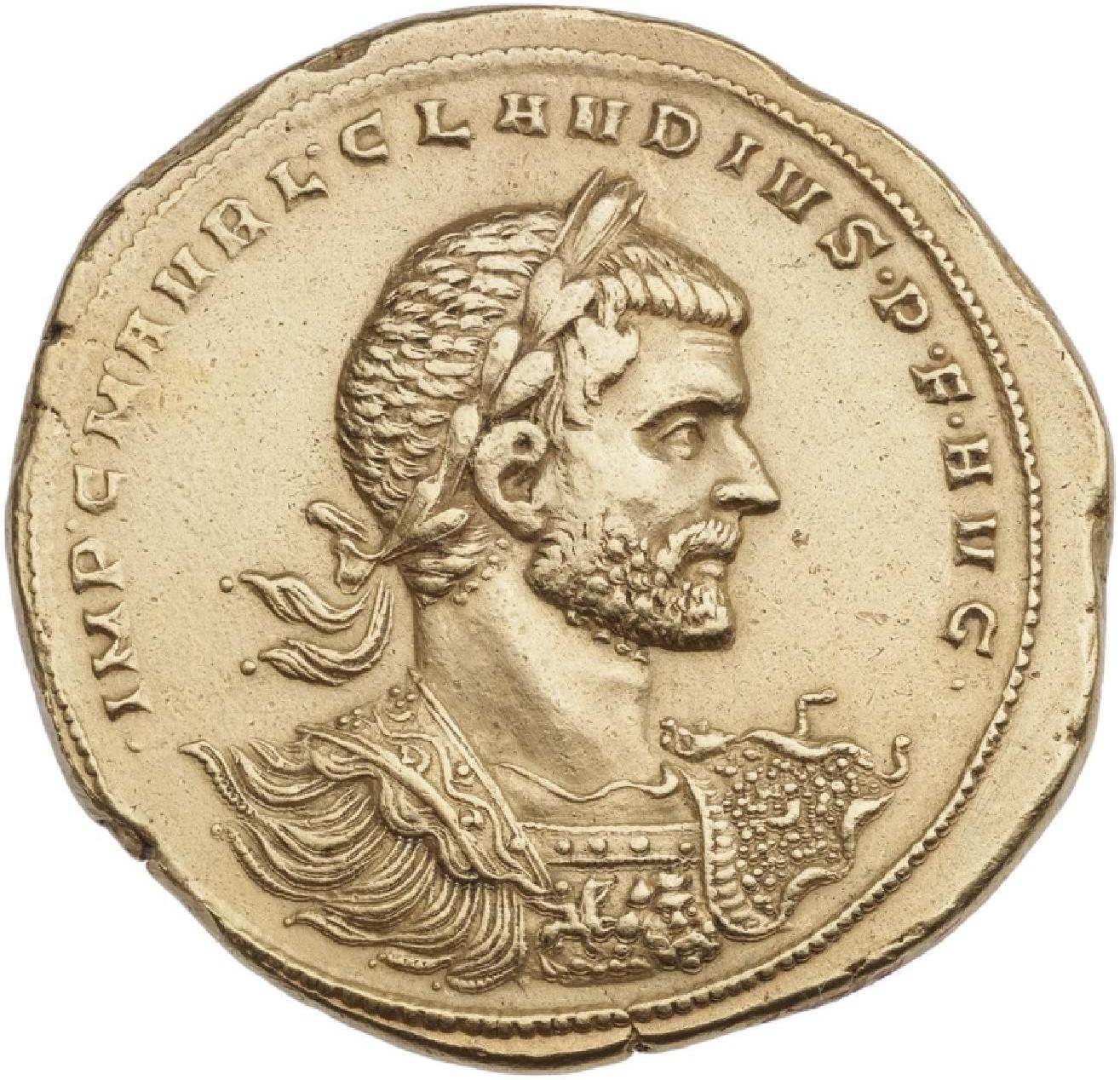
- Gold medallion (worth 8 aurei) depicting Claudius Gothicus. Legend: imp c m aurl claudius p f aug

Roman emperor
- Reign: 268–270
- Predecessor: Gallienus
- Successor: Quintillus
- Born: 10 May 214
- Died: August/September 270 (aged 55)
Names
- Marcus Aurelius Claudius
Regnal name
- Imperator Caesar Marcus Aurelius Claudius Augustus
- Dynasty: Gordian?
- Father: Unknown, possibly Gordian II
- Mother: Unknown

Claudius 'Gothicus' (Latin: Marcus Aurelius Claudius; 10 May 214 – August/September 270), also known as Claudius II, was Roman emperor from 268 to 270. During his reign he fought successfully against the Alemanni and decisively defeated the Goths at the Battle of Naissus. He died after succumbing to a "pestilence", possibly the Plague of Cyprian that had ravaged the provinces of the Empire.

== Origins and early life ==
The most significant source for Claudius II (and the only one regarding his early life) is the collection of imperial biographies called the Historia Augusta. However, his story, like the rest of the Historia Augusta, is riddled with fabrications and obsequious praises. In 4th century, Claudius was declared a relative of Constantine the Great's father, Constantius Chlorus, and, consequently, of the ruling dynasty. The Historia Augusta should be used with extreme caution and supplemented with information from other sources: the works of Aurelius Victor, Pseudo-Aurelius Victor, Eutropius, Orosius, Joannes Zonaras, and Zosimus, as well as coins and inscriptions.

The future emperor Marcus Aurelius Claudius was born on 10 May 214. Some researchers suggest a later date of 219 or 220. Nevertheless, most historians adhere to the first version. Moreover, as the 6th century Byzantine historian John Malalas reports, at the time of his death Claudius was 56 years old. The birthplace of Claudius is unknown. He might have been born somewhere near the Danube.

According to the fourth-century Epitome de Caesaribus, he was thought to be a bastard son of Gordian II, although this is doubted by some historians.

The Historia Augusta refers to him as a member of the gens Flavia, likely an attempt to further connect him with the future emperor Flavius Valerius Constantius.

== Rise to power ==
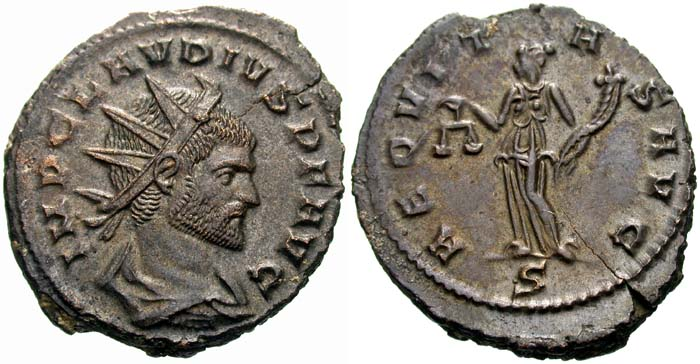
AE antoninianus of Claudius. Legend: imp clavdivs p f avg

Before coming to power, Claudius served with the Roman army, where he had a successful career and secured appointments to the highest military posts. The Historia Augusta says that he was a military tribune in the reign of Decius (249–251). The same source describes his being sent to defend Thermopylae, in connection with which the governor of Achaea was ordered to supply him with soldiers. However, there is no evidence that the Goths who invaded at that time threatened the region, since their activities did not extend beyond the middle Balkans. Most likely the account in the Historia Augusta is an anachronism, since it is known that the garrison at Thermopylae appeared in 254. Historian François Pashau suggests that this passage was invented in order to contrast the successful pagan commander Claudius with the unlucky Christian generals who allowed the ruin of Greece by the Gothic leader Alaric I in 396.

It is possible Claudius gained his position and the respect of the soldiers by being physically strong and especially cruel. A legend tells of Claudius knocking out a horse's teeth with one punch. In a wrestling match during the 250s, he also knocked out the teeth of an opponent who had tried to disable him by seizing his genitals. Aurelius Victor says that Decius rewarded Claudius after he demonstrated his strength while fighting another soldier at the Games of Mars. After the murder of his predecessor Gallienus, in which he was rumored to be involved, Claudius tempered his violent disposition and asked the Roman Senate to spare the lives of Gallienus's family and supporters. He was less magnanimous toward Rome's enemies and it was to this that he owed his popularity.

Claudius was proclaimed emperor by his army, and, like Maximinus Thrax before him, was of barbarian birth. After a period of failed aristocratic Roman emperors following Maximinus's death, Claudius was the first in a series of tough "soldier emperors" who would eventually restore the Empire after the Crisis of the Third Century.

=== Downfall of Gallienus ===
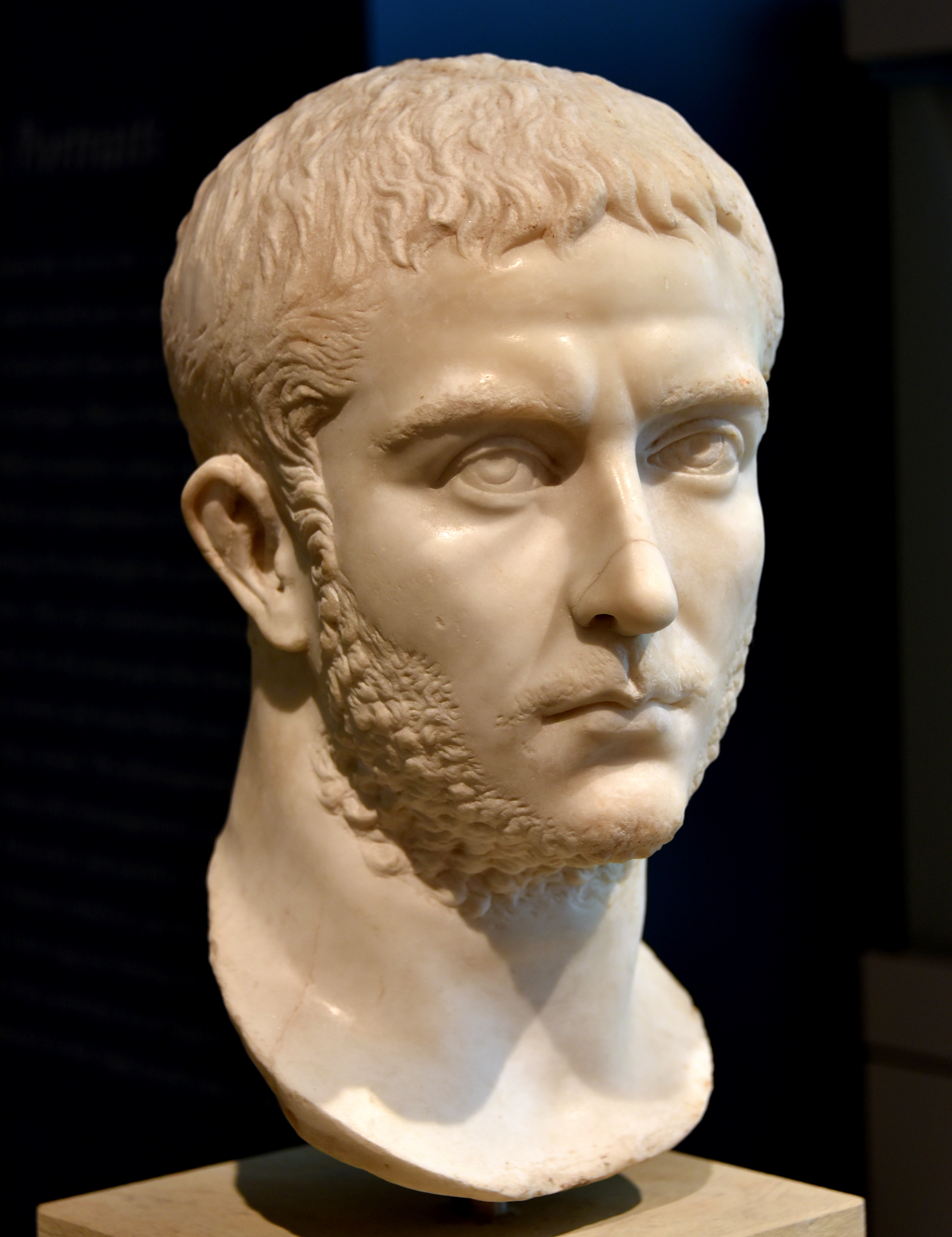
Roman emperor Gallienus, (r. 253–268)

During the 260s, the breakup of the Roman Empire into three distinct governing entities (the core Roman Empire, the Gallic Empire and the Palmyrene Empire) placed the whole Roman imperium in a precarious position. Gallienus was seriously weakened by his failure to defeat Postumus in the West, and his acceptance of Odaenathus ruling a de facto independent kingdom within the Roman Empire in the East. By 268, this situation had changed, as Odaenathus was assassinated, most likely due to court intrigue, and Gallienus fell victim to a mutiny in his own ranks. Upon the death of Odaenathus, power fell to his younger son, who was dominated by his mother, Zenobia.

Under threat of invasion in the Balkans by multiple Germanic tribes, Gallienus's troubles primarily lay with Postumus, whom he could not attack because his attention was required in dealing with an insurrection led by Macrianus and the threats created by the invading Scythians. After four years of delay, Postumus had established some control over the Empire. In 265, when Gallienus and his men crossed the Alps, they defeated and besieged Postumus in an (unnamed) Gallic city. When victory appeared to be near, Gallienus made the mistake of approaching the city walls too closely and was gravely injured, compelling him to cease his campaign against Postumus. Over the next three years, Gallienus's troubles only got worse. The Scythians successfully invaded the Balkans in the early months of 268, and Aureolus, a commander of the Roman cavalry based in Milan, declared himself an ally of Postumus and went so far as to claim the imperial throne for himself.

At this time, another invasion was taking place. In 268, a tribe or grouping called the Herulians moved through Asia Minor and then into Greece on a naval expedition. Despite this, scholars assume Gallienus's efforts were focused on Aureolus, the officer who betrayed him, and the defeat of the Herulians was left to his successor, Claudius Gothicus.

The death of Gallienus was surrounded by conspiracy and betrayal, as were many emperors' deaths. Different accounts of the incident have been recorded, but they agree that senior officials wanted Gallienus dead. According to two accounts, the prime conspirator was Aurelius Heraclianus, the Praetorian Prefect. One version of the story tells of Heraclianus bringing Claudius into the plot while the account given by the Historia Augusta exculpates the soon-to-be emperor and adds the prominent general Lucius Aurelius Marcianus into the plot. The removal of Claudius from the conspiracy may be due to his later role as the progenitor of the house of Constantine, a fiction of Constantine's time, and suggests that the original version from which these two accounts derive was current prior to the reign of Constantine. It was written that while sitting down at dinner, Gallienus was told that Aureolus and his men were approaching the camp. Gallienus rushed to the front lines, ready to give orders, when he was struck down by a commander of his cavalry. In a different and more controversial account, Aureolus forges a document in which Gallienus appears to be plotting against his generals and makes sure it falls into the hands of the emperor's senior staff. In this plot, Aurelian is added as a possible conspirator. The tale of his involvement in the conspiracy might be seen as at least partial justification for the murder of Aurelian himself under circumstances that seem remarkably similar to those in this story.

Whichever story is true, Gallienus was killed in the summer of 268, probably between July and October, and Claudius was chosen by the army outside of Milan to succeed him. Accounts tell of people hearing the news of the new emperor, and reacting by murdering Gallienus's family members until Claudius declared he would respect the memory of his predecessor. Claudius had the deceased emperor deified and buried in a family tomb on the Appian Way. The traitor Aureolus was not treated with the same reverence, as he was killed by his besiegers after a failed attempt to surrender.

== Reign ==
At the time of Claudius's accession, the Roman Empire was in serious danger from several incursions, both inside and outside its borders. The most pressing of these was an invasion of Illyricum and Pannonia by the Goths. Although Gallienus had already inflicted some damage on them at the Battle of Nestus, Claudius, not long after being named emperor, followed this up by winning his greatest victory, and one of the greatest in the history of Roman arms.

The Roman Empire in 268

At the Battle of Naissus, Claudius and his legions routed a huge Gothic army. Together with his cavalry commander, the future Emperor Aurelian, the Romans took thousands of prisoners and destroyed the Gothic cavalry as a force. The victory earned Claudius his surname of "Gothicus" (conqueror of the Goths). The Goths were soon driven back across the Danube by Aurelian, and nearly a century passed before they again posed a serious threat to the empire.

Around the same time, the Alamanni had crossed the Alps and attacked the empire. Claudius responded quickly, routing the Alamanni at the Battle of Lake Benacus in the late fall of 268, a few months after the Battle of Naissus. For this he was awarded the title of "Germanicus Maximus." He then turned on the Gallic Empire, ruled by a pretender for the past eight years and encompassing Britain, Gaul, and the Iberian Peninsula. He won several victories and soon regained control of Hispania and the Rhone river valley of Gaul. This set the stage for the later destruction of the Gallic Empire under Aurelian.

=== Government and foreign affairs ===
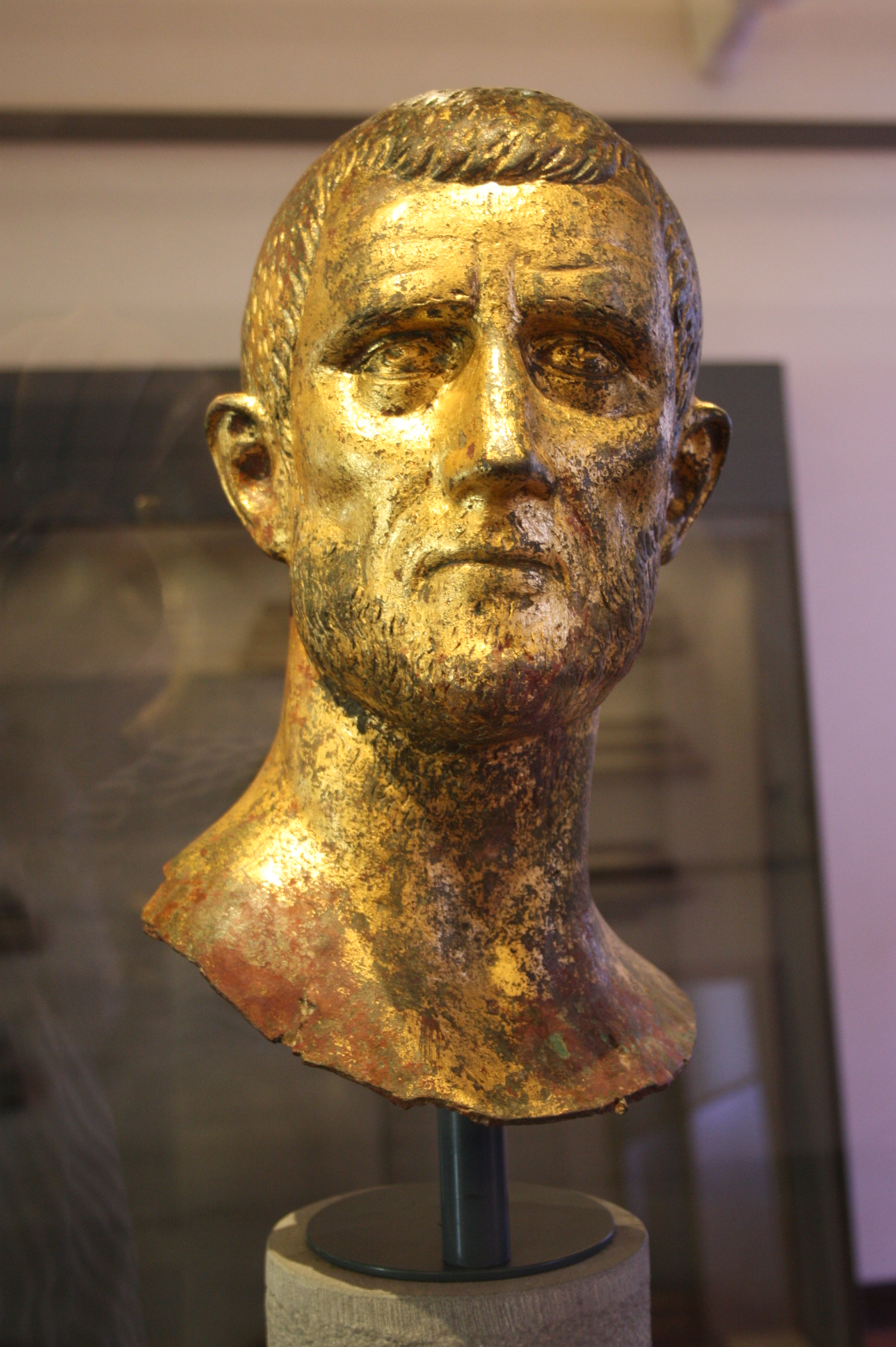
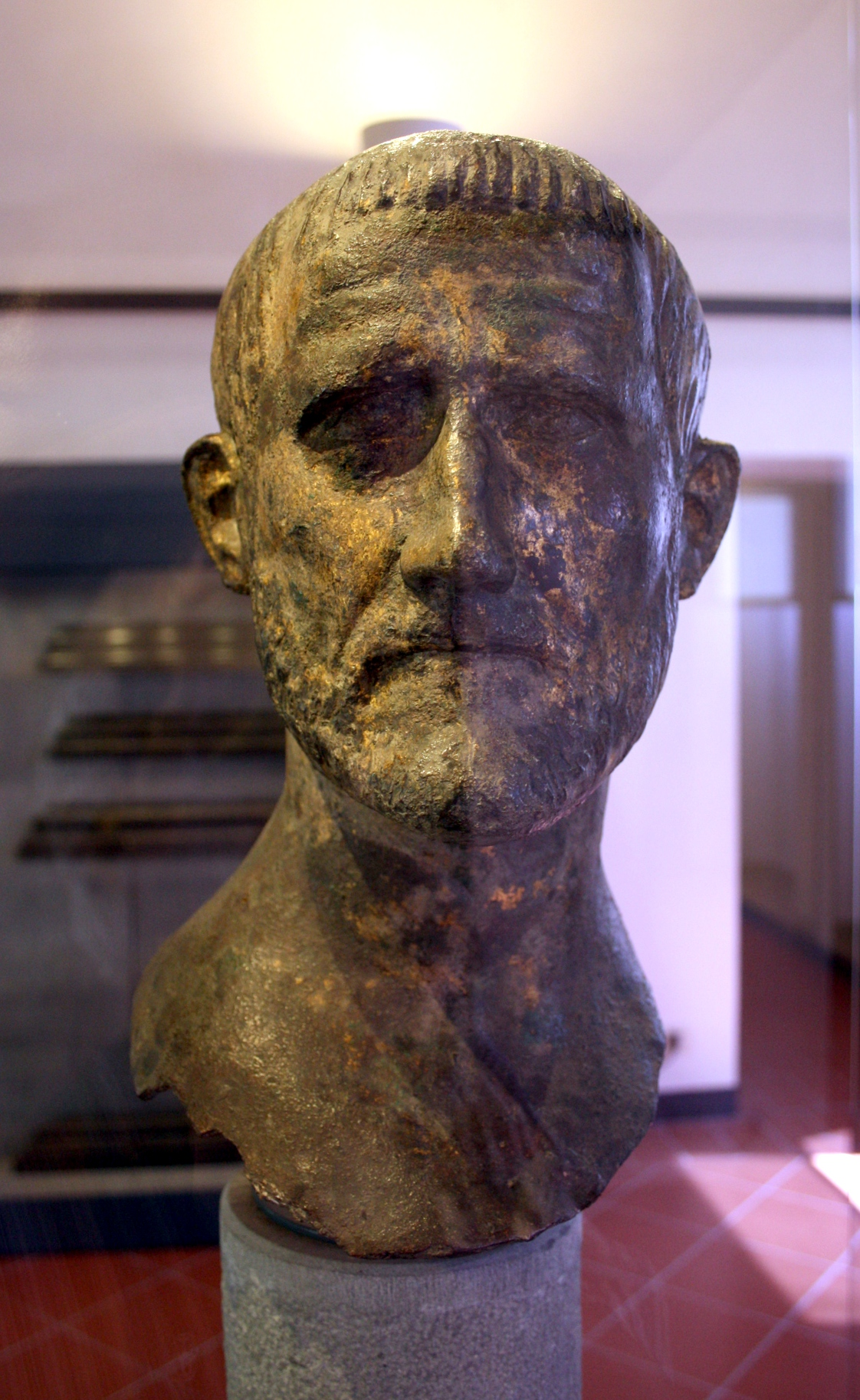
Two bronze statues traditionally identified as Claudius Gothicus. Santa Giulia Museum, Brescia (Italy). Such identifications have been questioned.

Claudius was not the only man to reap the benefits of holding high office after the death of Gallienus. Before the rule of Claudius Gothicus, there had only been two emperors from the Balkans, but afterwards there would only be one emperor who did not hail from the provinces of Pannonia, Moesia or Illyricum until 378, when Theodosius I from Hispania would take the throne. Four inscriptions provide an insight into the government at the time. The first is a dedication to Aurelius Heraclianus, the prefect involved in the conspiracy against Gallienus, from Traianus Mucianus, who also gave a dedication to Heraclianus's brother, Aurelius Appollinaris, who was the equestrian governor of the province of Thracia in 267–68 AD. Because these men shared the family name, Marcus Aurelius, a name given to those made citizens by the constitutio Antoniniana, these men did not come from the imperial élite. The third inscription reveals the career of Marcianus, another leading general by the time that Gallienus died. The fourth honours Julius Placidianus, the prefect of the vigiles. Heraclianus, Appollinaris, Placidianus, or Marcianus may not have been of Danubian origin themselves, but none of them were members of the Severan aristocracy, and all of them appear to owe their prominence to their military roles. Marcus Aurelius Probus (another emperor in waiting) was also of Balkan background, and from a family enfranchised in the time of Caracalla.

Although their influence was weakened, there were still a number of men with influence from the older aristocracy. Claudius assumed the consulship in 269 with Paternus, a member of the prominent senatorial family, the Paterni, who had supplied consuls and urban prefects throughout Gallienus's reign, and thus were quite influential. In addition, Flavius Antiochianus, one of the consuls of 270, who was an urban prefect the year before, would continue to hold his office for the following year. A colleague of Antiochianus, Virius Orfitus, also the descendant of a powerful family, would continue to hold influence during his father's term as prefect. Aurelian's colleague as consul was another such man, Pomponius Bassus, a member of one of the oldest senatorial families, as was one of the consuls in 272, Junius Veldumnianus.

In his first full year of power, Claudius was greatly assisted by the sudden destruction of the imperium Galliarum. When Ulpius Cornelius Laelianus, a high official under Postumus, declared himself emperor in Germania Superior, in the spring of 269, Postumus defeated him, but in doing so, refused to allow the sack of Mainz, which had served as Laelianus's headquarters. This proved to be his downfall, for out of anger, Postumus's army mutinied and murdered him. Selected by the troops, Marcus Aurelius Marius was to replace Postumus as ruler. Marius's rule did not last long though, as Victorinus, Postumus's praetorian prefect, defeated him. Now emperor of the Gauls, Victorinus was soon in a precarious position, for the Spanish provinces had deserted the Gallic Empire and declared their loyalty to Claudius, while in southern Gaul, Placidianus had captured Grenoble. Luckily, it was there that Placidianus stopped and Victorinus's position stabilized. In the next year, when Autun revolted, declaring itself for Claudius, the central government made no moves to support it. As a result, the city went through a siege, lasting many weeks, until it was finally captured and sacked by Victorinus.

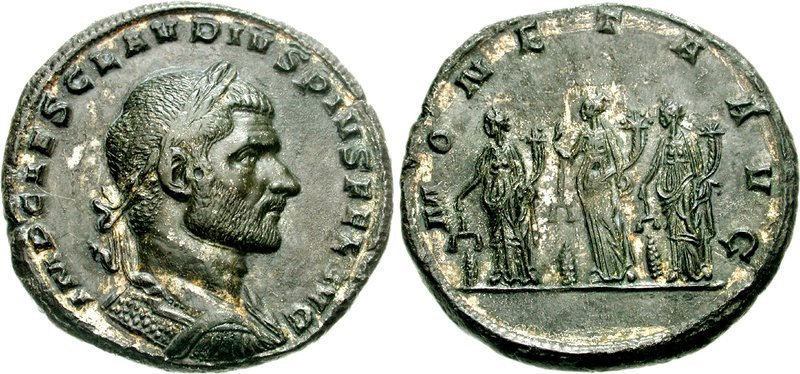
Medallion of Claudius. An attempt of his to reform Roman currency is commemorated on the reverse with three Monetae, personifications of gold, silver, and bronze

It is still unknown why Claudius did nothing to help the city of Autun, but sources tell us his relations with Palmyra were waning in the course of 269. An obscure passage in the Historia Augusta's life of Gallienus states that he had sent an army under Aurelius Heraclianus to the region that had been annihilated by Zenobia. But because Heraclianus was not actually in the east in 268 (instead, at this time, he was involved in the conspiracy of Gallienus's death), this cannot be correct. But the confusion evident in this passage, which also places the bulk of Scythian activity during 269 a year earlier, under Gallienus, may stem from a later effort to pile all possible disasters in this year into the reign of the former emperor. This would keep Claudius's record of being an ancestor of Constantine from being tainted. If this understanding of the sources is correct, it might also be correct to see the expedition of Heraclianus to the east as an event of Claudius's time.

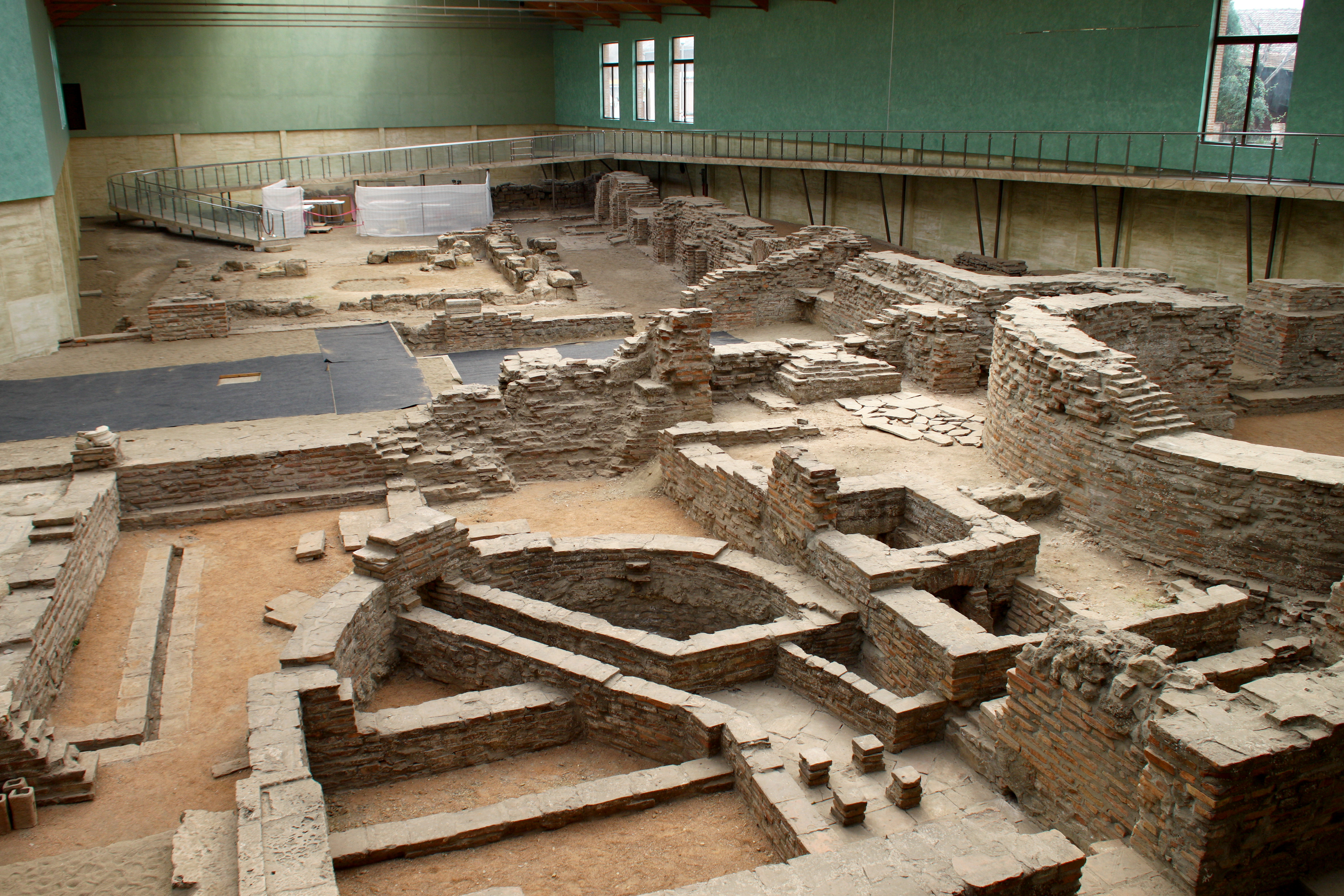
Ruins of Imperial Palace at Sirmium, today in Sremska Mitrovica

The victories of Claudius over the Goths would not only make him a hero in Latin tradition, but an admirable choice as an ancestor for Constantine I, who was born at Naissus, the site of Claudius's victory in 269. Claudius is also held in high esteem by Zonaras, whose Greek tradition seems to have been influenced by Latin. For Zosimus, a more reasoned contemporary view shows Claudius as less grand. Claudius's successes in the year 269 were not continued in his next year as emperor. As the Scythians starved in the mountains or surrendered, the legions pursuing them began to see an epidemic spreading throughout the men. Also, Claudius's unwillingness to do anything at the siege of Autun likely provoked a quarrel with Zenobia.

Although it is not proven that the invasion of Gaul was the breaking point between Claudius and Zenobia, the sequence of events point to the siege as an important factor. The issue at hand was the position that Odaenathus held as corrector totius orientis (imparting overall command of the Roman armies and authority over the Roman provincial governors in the designated region). Vaballathus, the son of Zenobia, was given this title when Zenobia claimed it for him. From then on, tension between the two empires would only get worse. Aurelius Heraclianus's fabled arrival might have been an effort to reassert central control after the death of Odaenathus, but, if so, it failed. Although coins were never minted with the face of Odaenathus, soon after his death coins were made with image of his son – outstripping his authority under the emperor.

Under Zabdas, a Palmyrene army invaded Arabia and moved into Egypt in the late summer. At this time, the prefect of Egypt was Tenagino Probus, described as an able soldier who not only defeated an invasion of Cyrenaica by the nomadic tribes to the south in 269, but also was successful in hunting down Scythian ships in the Mediterranean. However, he did not see the same success in Egypt, for a group allied to the Palmyrene empire, led by Timagenes, undermined Probus, defeated his army, and killed him in a battle near the modern city of Cairo in the late summer of 270.

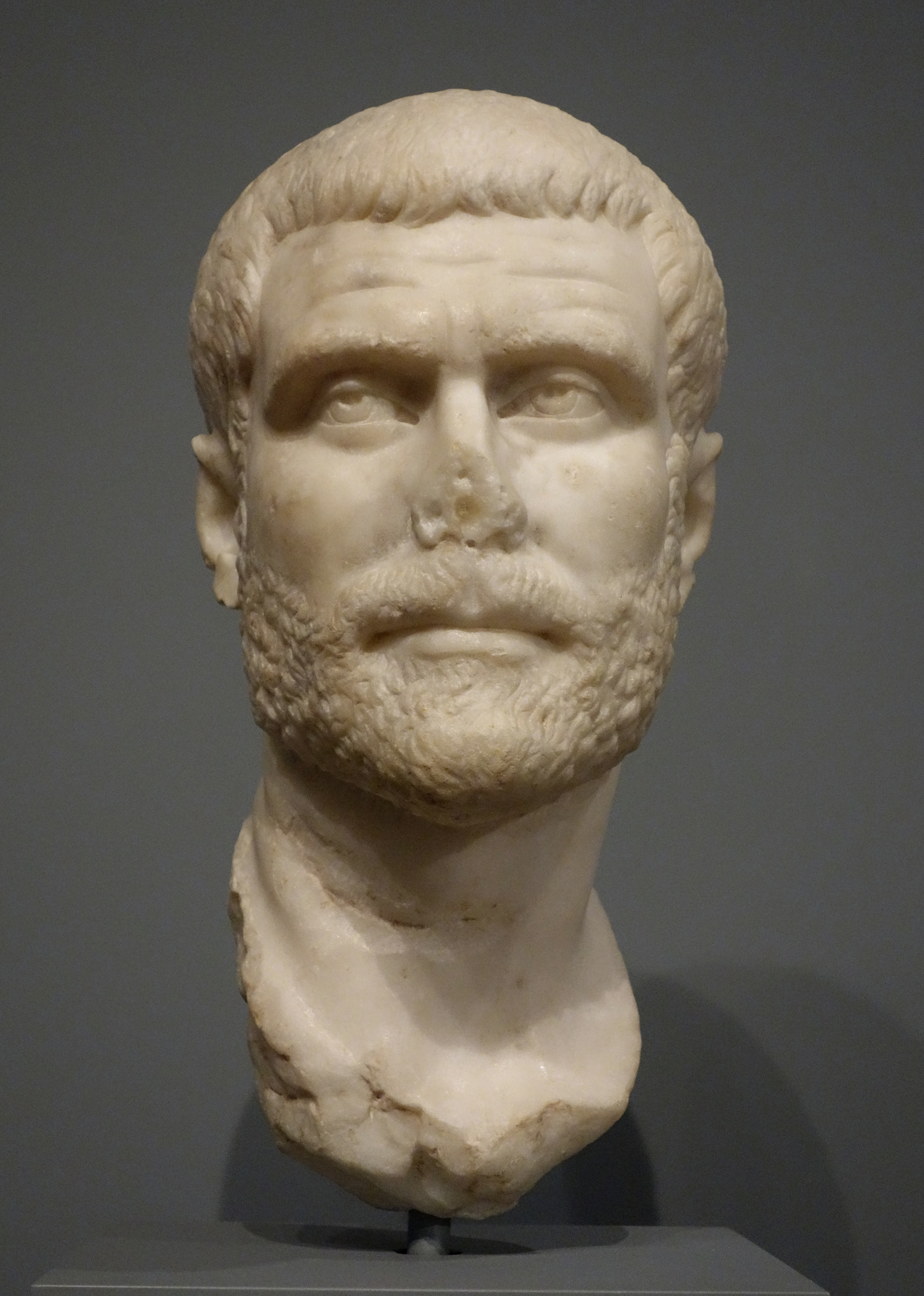
Portrait head of a 3rd-century soldier-emperor, very likely Claudius Gothicus (Worcester Art Museum).

Generally, when a Roman commander is killed it is taken as a sign that a state of war is in existence, and if we can associate the death of Heraclianus in 270, as well as an inscription from Bostra recording the rebuilding of a temple destroyed by the Palmyrene army, then these violent acts could be interpreted the same way. Yet they apparently were not. As David Potter writes, "The coins of Vaballathus avoid claims to imperial power: he remains vir consularis, rex, imperator, dux Romanorum, a range of titles that did not mimic those of the central government. The status vir consularis was, as we have seen, conferred upon Odaenathus; the title rex, or king, is simply a Latin translation of mlk, or king; imperator in this context simply means "victorious general"; and dux Romanorum looks like yet another version of corrector totius orientis" (Potter, 263). These titles suggest that Odaenathus's position was inheritable. In Roman culture, the status gained in procuring a position could be passed on, but not the position itself. It is possible that the thin line between office and the status that accompanied it were dismissed in the Palmyrene court, especially when the circumstance worked against the interests of a regime that was able to defeat Persia, which a number of Roman emperors had failed to do. Vaballathus stressed the meanings of titles, because in the Palmyrene context, the titles of Odaenathus meant a great deal. When the summer of 270 ended, things were looking very different in the empire than they did a year before. After its success, Gaul was in a state of inactivity and the empire was failing in the east. Insufficient resources plagued the state, as a great deal of silver was used for the antoninianus, which was again diluted.

=== Death ===
Claudius did not live long enough to fulfil his goal of reuniting all the lost territories of the empire. Late in 269 he had travelled to Sirmium and was preparing to go to war against the Vandals, who were raiding in Pannonia. However, he fell victim to the Plague of Cyprian (possibly smallpox), and died early in 270. Before his death, he is thought to have named Aurelian as his successor, though Claudius's brother Quintillus briefly seized power. The Senate immediately deified Claudius as "Divus Claudius Gothicus".

Historians date Claudius's death in either January, April, August, or September. These discrepancies are the result of the various conflicting sources. The Chronograph of 354 gives Claudius a reign of "1 year and 4 months", Jerome and Aurelius Victor both give "1 year and 9 months". Some Alexandrian coins have been dated to his third year, suggesting that he died in September 270 (the Coptic calendar began on 29 August). Arthur Stein dated Claudius' death to April, citing a document of Aurelian that he dated to 25 May 270. However, modern scholars believe this document to be dated to 271. The date is strangely given as the "3rd" and "1st year", which most likely refers to the third year of Claudius and first of Aurelian (who dated his reign from Claudius' death). The last confirmed document is dated to 20 September 270, although another undated papyri could be tentatively dated to October.

== Religion ==
A short history of imperial Rome, entitled De Caesaribus, written by Aurelius Victor in 361, states that Claudius consulted the Sibylline Books prior to his campaigns against the Goths. Hinting that Claudius "revived the tradition of the Decii", Victor illustrates the senatorial view, which saw Claudius's predecessor, Gallienus, as too relaxed when it came to religious policies.

== Links to the Constantinian dynasty ==
The unreliable Historia Augusta reports Claudius and Quintillus having another brother named Crispus and through him a niece, Claudia, who reportedly married Eutropius and was mother to Constantius Chlorus. The same source also gives Claudius the nomina "Flavius Valerius" to strengthen his connection to Constantius. Zonaras and Eutropius on the other hand claim Chlorus was Claudia's daughter's son. Historians suspect these accounts to be a genealogical fabrication intended to link the family of Constantine I to that of a well-respected emperor.

== Saint Valentine ==
Claudius Gothicus has been linked to Saint Valentine since the Middle Ages. Contemporary records of his deeds were most probably destroyed during the Diocletianic Persecution in early 4th century and a tale of martyrdom was recorded in Passio Marii et Marthae, a work published in the 5th or 6th century. 20th-century historians agree that the accounts from this period cannot be verified. The legend refers to "Emperor Claudius", but Claudius I did not persecute Christians (minus the one mention by Suetonius of Jewish followers of "Chrestus" being expelled from Rome; see Suetonius on Christians), so people believe he was Claudius II even though this emperor spent most of his time warring outside his territory.

The legend was retold in later texts, and in the Nuremberg Chronicle of 1493, involved the Roman priest being martyred during a general persecution of Christians. The text states that St. Valentine was beaten with clubs and finally beheaded for giving aid to Christians in Rome. The Golden Legend of 1260 recounts how St. Valentine refused to deny Christ before the "Emperor Claudius" in 270 and as a result was beheaded. Since then, February 14 marks Valentine's Day, a day set aside by the Christian church in memory of the Roman priest and physician.

== See also ==
- List of Roman emperors

== Sources ==
=== Primary sources ===
- Aurelius Victor, Epitome de Caesaribus
- Eutropius, Breviarium ab urbe condita
- Historia Augusta, Life of Claudius The accuracy of this source has been questioned.
- Joannes Zonaras, Compendium of History extract: Zonaras: Alexander Severus to Diocletian: 222–284
- Zosimus, Historia Nova

=== Secondary sources ===
- Weigel, Richard D. "Claudius II Gothicus (268–270)", De Imperatoribus Romanis, 2001
- Jones, A. H. M.; J. R. Martindale & J. Morris (1971). The Prosopography of the Later Roman Empire Volume 1: A.D. 260–395. Cambridge University Press. ISBN 0-521-07233-6.
- Gibbon. Edward Decline & Fall of the Roman Empire (1888)
- Curran, John R. Pagan City and Christian Capital: Rome in the Fourth Century. Oxford: Clarendon, 2000. Print
- Larue, Gerald A. "There They Go Again!" The Humanist Sept. 1999: 1. Print.
- Meijer, Fik. Emperors Don't Die in Bed. London: Routledge, 2004. Print.
- Potter, David S. "Bryn Mawr Classical Review 2005.08.01." The Bryn Mawr Classical Review. 2004.
- Homo, L. (1903). De Claudio Gothico, Romanorum imperatore (268–270). Paris: H. Jouve.
- Damerau, P. (1934). Kaiser Claudius II. Goticus (268–270 n. Chr.). Leipzig: Dieterich.
- Henze, Walter, "Aurelius 82", Realencyclopädie der classischen Altertumswissenschaft, volume 4 (II.2), Metzlerscher Verlag (Stuttgart, 1896), columns 2458–2462.
- Kienast, D. (2017). Römische Kaisertabelle. Grundzüge einer römischen Kaiserchronologie (in German). Darmstadt: Wissenschaftliche Buchgesellschaft. ISBN 978-3-534-13289-8.
- Paschoud, F. (1992). "Claude II aux Thermopyles? A propos de HA, Claud. 16,1, Zosime 5,5 et Eunape, Vitae Soph. 7, 3, 4-5". Publications de l'École française de Rome (in French). 159: 21–28.
- Kotula, T. (1994). "Autour de Claude II le Gothique: péripéties d'un mythe". Revue des Études Anciennes (in French). 96 (3): 499–509. doi:10.3406/rea.1994.4592.
- Southern, Pat (2001). The Roman Empire from Severus to Constantine. London, New York: Routledge. ISBN 978-0-415-23943-1.
- Watson (2004). "A.". Aurelian and the Third Century. London: Routledge. ISBN 978-1-134-90815-8.
- Potter, D. S. (2004). The Roman Empire at Bay, AD 180—395. London: Routledge. ISBN 978-0-415-10058-8.
- Hartmann, U.; Gerhardt, T. (2008). Johne K.-P (ed.). Die Zeit der Soldatenkaiser: Krise und Transformation des Römischen Reiches im 3. Jahrhundert n. Chr. (235-284) (in German). Berlin: Walter de Gruyter. ISBN 978-3-05-008807-5.

Regnal titles
Preceded by Gallienus	Roman emperor 268–270	Succeeded by Quintillus
Political offices
Preceded by Aspasius Paternus; P. Licinius Egnatius Marinianus; Postumus	Roman consul 269 with Paternus, Victorinus, Sanctus	Succeeded by Flavius Antiochianus; Virius Orfitus; Victorinus
