= Postumius Suagrus =

Postumius Suagrus or Suagrius (fl. 3rd century AD) was a Roman senator.

== Biography ==
Postumius Suagrus was a member of the third century gens Postumii, which was not descended from the Republican family of the same name. He may have served as suffect consul sometime prior to AD 275. In that year, he was appointed Praefectus urbi of Rome.

== Sources ==
- Martindale, John R.; Jones, A. H. M.; Morris, John, eds. (1971). The Prosopography of the Later Roman Empire: Volume I, AD 260–395. Cambridge: Cambridge University Press. ISBN 0-521-07233-6.
- Mennen, Inge, Power and Status in the Roman Empire, AD 193-284 (2011)

Political offices
Preceded by Uncertain	Consul suffectus of the Roman Empire before AD 275	Succeeded by Uncertain
Preceded by Virius Orfitus	Praefectus urbi 273 – 274	Succeeded by Ovinius Pacatianus
