= Flavius Antiochianus (praetorian prefect) =

Roman eques (died 222)

Flavius Antiochianus (died March 222) was a Roman eques who flourished during the reign of the emperor Septimius Severus and his sons. He was appointed to a series of imperial offices, most importantly praetorian prefect under the Roman emperor Elagabalus.

Antiochianus served as a prefect of one auxiliary cohort in Germania Superior in 211, and subsequently of another in Mauretania Caesariensis. He returned to Rome to serve as a praetorian prefect before 222, the year Elagabalus was assassinated. According to the Historia Augusta, Antiochianus defended Elagabalus against praetorians who were intent on killing him, confronting the soldiers searching for the emperor in the Gardens of Spes Vetus, reminding them of their oath to the emperor and persuading them not to kill him. He may have been one of the associates of Elagabalus murdered in the wake of the emperor's death.

His son, also called Flavius Antiochianus, was prominent during the reigns of several later Emperors.
