= Arcesilaus (consul) =

Roman senator and consul in 267

Arcesilaus (fl. 3rd century) was a Roman senator who was appointed consul in AD 267.

== Biography ==
Possibly of Greek descent, Arcesilaus was probably the grandson of Titus Flavius Arcesilaus, who was a Flamen of the Arval Brethren, and who served as the magister creatus throughout the 220s. Arcesilaus himself was probably the Comes of Rome and Italia in AD 257. He was later made consul posterior alongside Ovinius Paternus in AD 267.

== Sources ==
- Christol, Michel, Essai sur l'évolution des carrières sénatoriales dans la seconde moitié du IIIe siècle ap. J.C. (1986)
- Martindale, John R.; Jones, A. H. M.; Morris, John, eds. (1971). The Prosopography of the Later Roman Empire: Volume I, AD 260–395. Cambridge: Cambridge University Press. ISBN 0-521-07233-6.

Political offices
Preceded by Publius Licinius Gallienus VII; Sabinillus	Consul of the Roman Empire; 267 with Ovinius Gaius Julius Aquilius Paternus	Succeeded by Aspasius Paternus II; Publius Licinius Egnatius Marinianus
