= Antonine Plague =

Disease outbreak (165–180 CE)

- Disease: Probably smallpox, but possibly measles
- First reported: Seleucia
- Date: 165–180
- Deaths: 5–10 million (estimated)
- Fatality rate: 25 percent

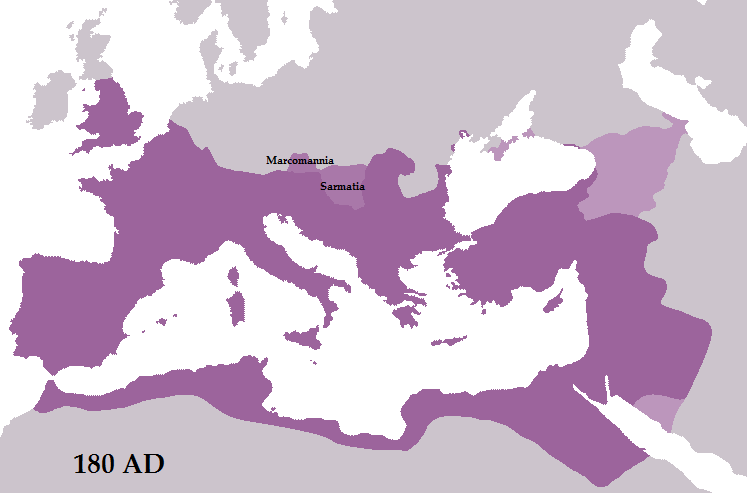
The Roman Empire in 180 AD.

The Antonine Plague of AD 165 to 180 (named for the emperors Marcus Aurelius and Lucius Verus of the Antonine dynasty), also known as the Plague of Galen (after Galen, the Greek physician who described it), was a prolonged and destructive epidemic, which affected the Roman Empire. It was possibly contracted and spread by soldiers who were returning from a campaign in the Near East.

Scholars generally believed that the plague was smallpox, due to the skin eruptions over the entirety of the body which appeared to be red and black (Horgan), but recent genetic evidence strongly suggests that the most severe form of smallpox did not arise in Europe until much later. Measles has also been suggested as a possible cause. As yet, there is no genetic evidence from the Antonine plague.

Ancient sources agree that the plague is likely to have appeared during the Roman siege of the Mesopotamian city of Seleucia in the winter of 165–166, during the Parthian campaign of Lucius Verus. Ammianus Marcellinus reported that the plague spread to Gaul and to the legions along the Rhine. Eutropius stated that a large proportion of the empire's population died from this outbreak. According to the contemporary Roman historian Cassius Dio, the disease broke out again nine years later in 189 AD and caused up to 2,000 deaths a day in the city of Rome, 25% of those who were affected. The total death count has been estimated at 5–10 million, roughly 10% of the population of the empire. The disease was particularly deadly in the cities and within the Roman army.

The Antonine plague occurred during the last years of the Pax Romana, the high point in the influence, territorial control, and population of the Roman Empire. Historians differ in their opinions of the impact of the plague on the empire in the increasingly troubled eras after its appearance. Based on archaeological records, Roman commercial activity in the Indian Ocean extending to the Indian subcontinent and Southeast Asia from ports of Roman Egypt seems to have suffered a major setback after the plague. This disruption likely contributed to a broader economic decline and social instability throughout the empire in the years that followed.

== Economic growth and poor health ==
Epidemics were common in the ancient world, but the Antonine plague was the first known pandemic of the Roman Empire. The Antonine plague spread throughout the Roman Empire and infected many millions of people. The pandemic erupted during the last years of what is often considered the "golden age" of Rome during the reign of co-emperor Marcus Aurelius. The Roman Empire at that time had a population estimated at 75 million people. Historians generally agree that the population of the Roman Empire peaked at about the time that the Antonine Plague appeared and, thereafter, the population declined.

The economic prosperity of the Roman Empire notwithstanding, the conditions were propitious for a pandemic. The population was unhealthy. About 20 percent of the population — a large percentage by ancient standards — lived in one of hundreds of cities; Rome, with a population estimated at one million, being the largest. The cities were a "demographic sink" even in the best of times. The death rate exceeded the birth rates and a constant in-migration of new residents was necessary to maintain the urban population. As perhaps more than one-half of children died before reaching adulthood, the average life expectancy at birth was only in the mid-twenties. Dense urban populations and poor sanitation contributed to the dangers of disease. The connectivity by land and sea between the vast territories of the Roman Empire made the transfer of infectious diseases from one region to another easier and more rapid than it was in smaller, more geographically confined societies. Epidemics of infectious diseases in the empire were common, with nine recorded between 43 BC and 148 AD. The rich were not immune to the unhealthy conditions. For example, only two of emperor Marcus Aurelius' fourteen children are known to have reached adulthood.

A good indicator of nutrition and the disease burden is the average height of the population. The conclusion of the study of thousands of skeletons is that the average Roman was shorter in stature than the people of pre-Roman societies of Italy and the post-Roman societies of the Middle Ages. The view of historian Kyle Harper is that "not for the last time in history, a precocious leap forward in social development brought biological reverses". This decline in average height during the Roman era may reflect the stresses of urbanization, warfare, and economic inequality. Despite increasing development, average height did not increase in Europe between 1000 and 1800, while it increased in the 5th and 6th centuries during late antiquity.

== Spread of the disease ==
The traditional Roman view attributed the cause of the Antonine plague to the violation by the Roman army of a temple in the city of Seleucia during the Parthian campaign of Lucius Verus. The soldiers then carried it back to the Roman Empire from the Parthian Empire in early 166. However, the first documented case of the plague was in Smyrna (in Roman Anatolia) in 165 where the orator Aelius Aristides almost died from the disease. From the east the plague spread westward reaching Rome in 166 and nearly every corner of the empire by 172. The co-emperor Lucius Verus died from the plague in 169 and it ravaged the Roman army.

The plague endured until about 180 and another epidemic, possibly related, is reported by Dio Cassius to have struck the city of Rome in 189. Two thousand people in the city often died on a single day. Whether this new epidemic, or recurrence of the Antonine plague, impacted the empire outside the city of Rome is unknown.

== Epidemiology ==
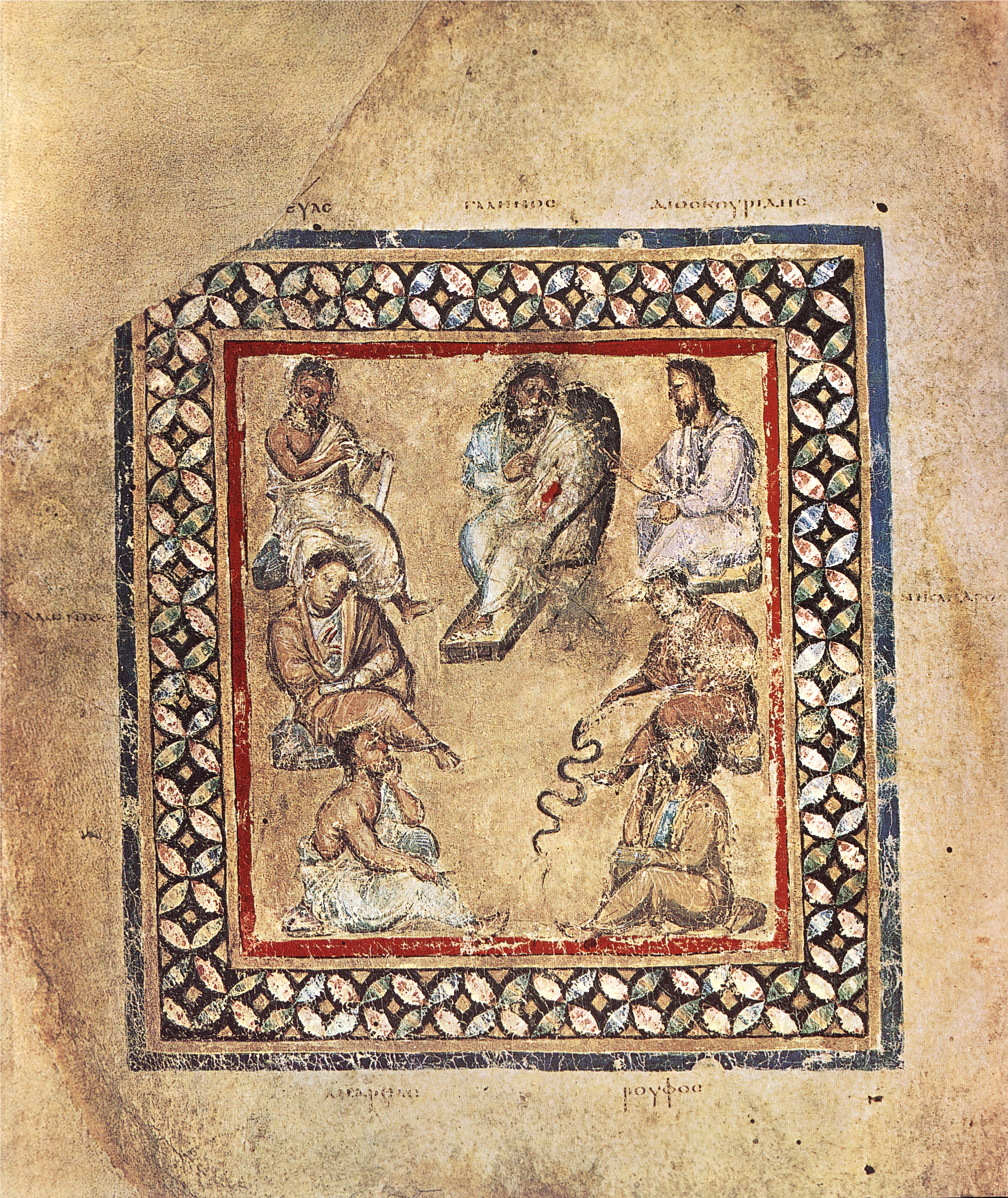
A group of physicians in an image from the Vienna Dioscurides. Galen, shown at the top centre, was an eyewitness to the Antonine Plague.

In 166, during the epidemic, the Greek physician and writer Galen traveled from Rome to his home in Asia Minor and returned to Rome in 168, when he was summoned by the two Augusti, the co-emperors Marcus Aurelius and Lucius Verus. He was present at the outbreak among troops stationed at Aquileia in the winter of 168/69. Galen briefly recorded observations and a description of the epidemic in the treatise Methodus Medendi ("Method of Treatment"), and he scattered other references to it among his voluminous writings. He described the plague as "great" and of long duration, and mentioned fever, diarrhea, and pharyngitis as well as a skin eruption, sometimes dry and sometimes pustular, that appeared on the 9th day of the illness to be a series of symptoms. The information that was provided by Galen does not unambiguously identify the nature of the disease, but scholars have generally preferred to diagnose it as smallpox.

The historian William H. McNeill asserts that the Antonine Plague and the later Plague of Cyprian (251–c. 270) were outbreaks of two different diseases, one of smallpox and one of measles but not necessarily in that order. The severe devastation to the European population from the two plagues may indicate that people had no previous exposure to either disease, which brought immunity to survivors. Other historians believe that both outbreaks involved smallpox. The latter view is bolstered by molecular estimates that place the evolution of measles sometime after 1000 AD. However, Galen's description of the Antonine Plague is not completely consistent with smallpox.

== Impact ==
Historians differ in their assessment of the impact of the Antonine Plague on Rome. To some, the plague was the beginning of the decline of the Roman Empire. To others, it was a minor event, documented by Galen and other writers but only slightly more deadly than other epidemics which frequently ravaged parts of the empire. Estimates of the fatalities from the pandemic range from 2 to 33% of the Roman Empire's population with deaths between 1.5 and 25 million people. Most estimates coalesce around a fatality rate of about 10% (7.5 million people) of the total population of the empire with death rates of up to 15% in the cities and the army. If the pandemic was indeed smallpox, the number who died would have probably been about 25% of those infected as the survival rate from smallpox is often around 75%.

The traditional view was expressed by Barthold Georg Niebuhr (1776–1831) who concluded that "as the reign of Marcus Aurelius forms a turning point in so many things, and above all in literature and art, I have no doubt that this crisis was brought about by that plague ... The ancient world never recovered from the blow inflicted on it by the plague which visited it in the reign of Marcus Aurelius." More recently, scholar Kyle Harper said something similar: the pandemic "in any account of Rome's destiny ... merit[s] a place squarely in the forefront." To the contrary, a team of six historians questioned the "extreme" position of Harper and others on this plague as "ignoring scholarship that suggests it had a less than catastrophic outcome," but the historians affirmed that "we do not doubt that disease and climate had some of the impact Harper describes."

Some historians have hypothesized that the epidemic resulted in a surge in the popularity of the cult of Asclepius, the god of medicine; the epigraphic record, however, shows no evidence of such increase in the cult's popularity.

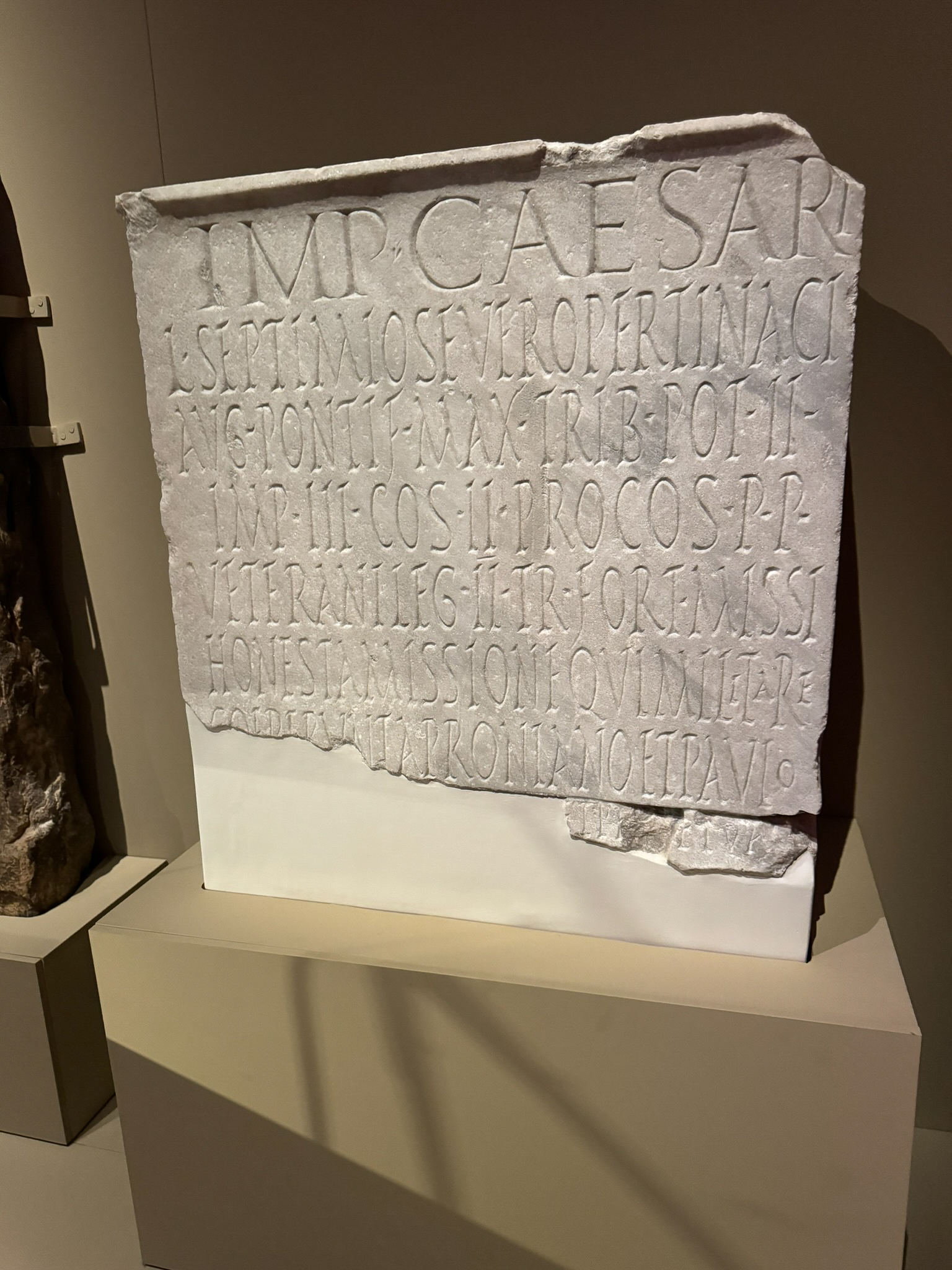
Memorial plaque dedicated by legionary veterans and survivors

=== Impact on the Roman army ===
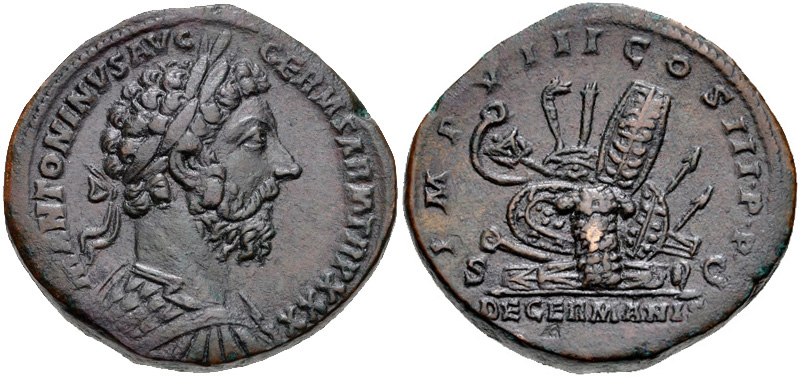
A Roman coin commemorating the victories of Marcus Aurelius in the Marcomannic Wars against the Germanic tribes along the Danube frontier in the early 170s AD

The ancient chroniclers portray the plague as a disaster for the Roman army with the army "reduced almost to extinction." This came in 166 at the beginning at the Marcomannic Wars in which Germanic tribes were invading Roman territory south of the middle Danube in what is now the Czech Republic and Slovakia, and south to Italy. As the Roman army struggled with manpower shortages, the plague not only decimated their ranks but also weakened their strategic positions. The impact of the plague forced Marcus Aurelius to recruit and train additional soldiers from among "gladiators, slaves, and bandits." After a delay of two years, in 169 the emperor launched an attack against the Germanic tribes. By 171, the Roman army had driven the invaders out of Roman territory. The war would continue sporadically until 180 when Marcus Aurelius died, possibly of the plague. This ongoing conflict contributed to a cycle of instability in the region. The plague may also have impacted the Germanic tribes.

== Climate connections ==
A VE7 volcanic event occurs in 173 AD at Taupo New Zealandia. VE7 events are rare events. According to 2024 research, major plagues that significantly impacted the Roman Empire, such as the Antonine Plague, the Plague of Cyprian, and the Plague of Justinian, are strongly linked to periods of cooler and drier climate conditions, indicating that colder weather may have contributed to the spread of these diseases during that time. It is thought climate stress interacted with social and biological variables, such as food availability, rodent populations, and human migration, making populations more susceptible to disease.

== See also ==
- List of epidemics

== General and cited references ==
- Bruun, Christer, "The Antonine Plague and the 'Third-Century Crisis'", in Olivier Hekster, Gerda de Kleijn, Danielle Slootjes (ed.), Crises and the Roman Empire: Proceedings of the Seventh Workshop of the International Network Impact of Empire, Nijmegen, June 20–24, 2006. Leiden/Boston: Brill, 2007 (Impact of Empire, 7), 201–218.
- Elliott, Colin (2025). Pox Romana: The Plague That Shook the Roman World. Princeton: Princeton University Press. ISBN 978-0-691-22070-3.
- de Crespigny, Rafe (2007). A Biographical Dictionary of Later Han to the Three Kingdoms (23–220 AD). Leiden: Koninklijke Brill, pp. 514–515, ISBN 978-90-04-15605-0.
- Gilliam, J. F. "The Plague Under Marcus Aurelius". American Journal of Philology 82.3 (July 1961), pp. 225–251.
- Hill, John E. (2009). Through the Jade Gate to Rome: A Study of the Silk Routes during the Later Han Dynasty, First to Second Centuries CE. BookSurge. ISBN 978-1-4392-2134-1.
- Littman, R.J.; Littman, M.L. (Autumn 1973). "Galen and the Antonine Plague". American Journal of Philology. 94 (3): 243–255. doi:10.2307/293979. JSTOR 293979. PMID 11616517.
- Marcus Aurelius. Meditations IX.2. Translation and Introduction by Maxwell Staniforth, Penguin, New York, 1981.
- McNeill, William H. Plagues and Peoples. Bantam Doubleday Dell Publishing Group, Inc., New York, 1976. ISBN 0-385-12122-9.
- Pulleyblank, Edwin G. "The Roman Empire as Known to Han China", Journal of the American Oriental Society, Vol. 119 (1999), pp. 71–79
- Zinsser, Hans. Rats, Lice and History: A Chronicle of Disease, Plagues, and Pestilence (1935). Reprinted by Black Dog & Leventhal Publishers, Inc. in 1996. ISBN 1-884822-47-9.
