= Virius Orfitus =

Roman statesman and consul in 270

Virius Orfitus was a Roman statesman who served as Consul in 270 and Praefectus urbi from 273 to 274. He was likely related to Lucius Virius Lupus Iulianus and Lucius Virius Agricola.

Preceded by Claudius Gothicus and Paternus	Consul of the Roman Empire; 270; With: Flavius Antiochianus	Succeeded by Aurelian and Pomponius Bassus
Preceded by Flavius Antiochianus	Praefectus urbi 273 – 274	Succeeded by Postumius Suagrus
