= Ovinius Paternus =

Roman senator and consul in 267

Ovinius Gaius Julius Aquilius Paternus (fl. 3rd century) was a Roman senator who was appointed consul in AD 267. (Note: He is not to be confused with the Consul of 268 (Aspasius Paternus) or 269 (also named Paternus).)

== Biography ==
Ovinius Paternus was a member of the Paterni, a prominent third century senatorial family. He was appointed consul prior in AD 267 alongside Arcesilaus. He exercised his duties in Rome while the emperor Gallienus was campaigning along the Danube against the Goths. In AD 281, Paternus was assigned by lot to a Proconsular province, either Africa or Asia, but in an unusual move he refused to accept the offered post. Instead, he took up the position of Praefectus urbi of Rome.

== Sources ==
- Christol, Michel, Essai sur l'évolution des carrières sénatoriales dans la seconde moitié du IIIe siècle ap. J.C. (1986)
- Martindale, John R.; Jones, A. H. M.; Morris, John, eds. (1971). The Prosopography of the Later Roman Empire: Volume I, AD 260–395. Cambridge: Cambridge University Press. ISBN 0-521-07233-6.

Political offices
Preceded by Publius Licinius Gallienus Augustus VII, and Sabinillus	Consul of the Roman Empire; 267 with Arcesilaus	Succeeded by Aspasius Paternus II, and Publius Licinius Egnatius Marinianus
