= Antoninianus =

Coin used during the Roman Empire

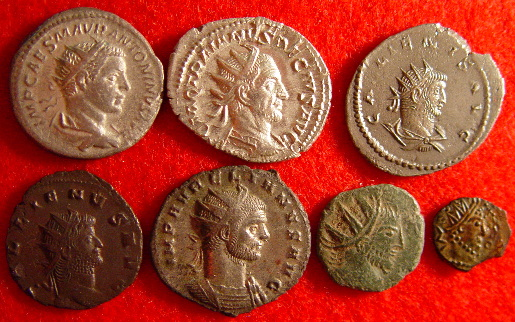
Row 1: Elagabalus (silver 218–222 AD), Trajan Decius (silver 249–251 AD), Gallienus (billon 253–268 AD Asian mint); Row 2: Gallienus (copper 253–268 AD), Aurelian (silvered 270–275 AD), barbarous radiate (copper), barbarous radiate (copper)

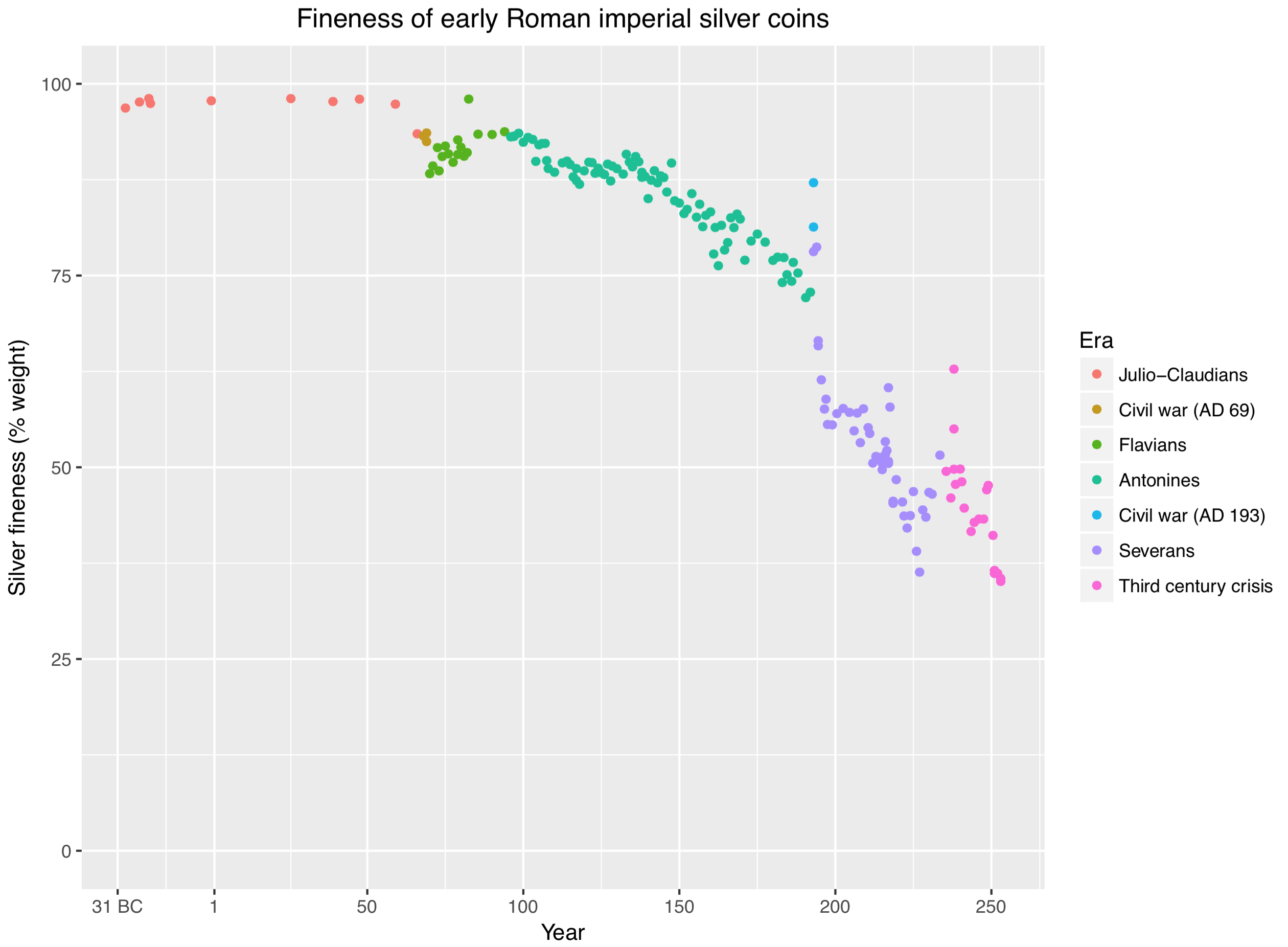
The antoninianus, introduced in 215 AD, continued the denarius's slow decline in silver purity.

The antoninianus or pre-reform radiate was a coin used during the Roman Empire thought to have been valued at 2 denarii. It was initially silver, but was slowly debased to bronze with a minimal silver content. The coin was introduced by Caracalla in early 215 AD. It was silver, similar to the denarius, except that it was slightly larger and featured the emperor wearing a radiate crown, indicating it was a double denomination. Antoniniani depicting women (usually the emperor's wife) featured the bust resting upon a crescent moon.

Even at its introduction, the silver content of the antoninianus was only equal to 1.5 denarii. This created inflation: people rapidly hoarded the denarii (Gresham's law), while both buyers and sellers recognized the new coin had a lower intrinsic value and elevated their prices to compensate. Silver bullion supplies began running short because the Roman Empire was no longer conquering new territory, the Iberian silver mines had been exhausted, and a series of soldier emperors and usurpers needed coin to pay their troops and buy their loyalty. Each new issue of the antoninianus thus had less silver in it than the last, and thus contributed to ever-increasing inflation.

In 271 AD, Aurelian increased the average weight of the antoninianus, this change lasting for only a short time. Around this time, the enigmatic XXI was first marked on the reverse of the antoninianus. The true meaning of this series of numbers is still a topic of debate, but is thought to represent a 20:1 silver ratio (4.76% silver, which may originally have been 5%, if worn-away silver enrichment on the surface is allowed for).

By the late 3rd century AD, antoniniani were almost entirely made of bronze reclaimed from melted-down older issues like the sestertius. Vast quantities were minted, with a large percentage of the circulating stock being contemporary forgeries, often with blundered legends and designs. Individual coins were by then practically worthless, and were lost or discarded by the millions. The resultant situation was not unlike the hyperinflation of the Weimar Republic in 1920s Germany, when paper money was printed in reckless abundance. The coin ceased to be used by the end of the 3rd century, when a series of monetary reforms attempted to arrest the decline by issuing new coinage.

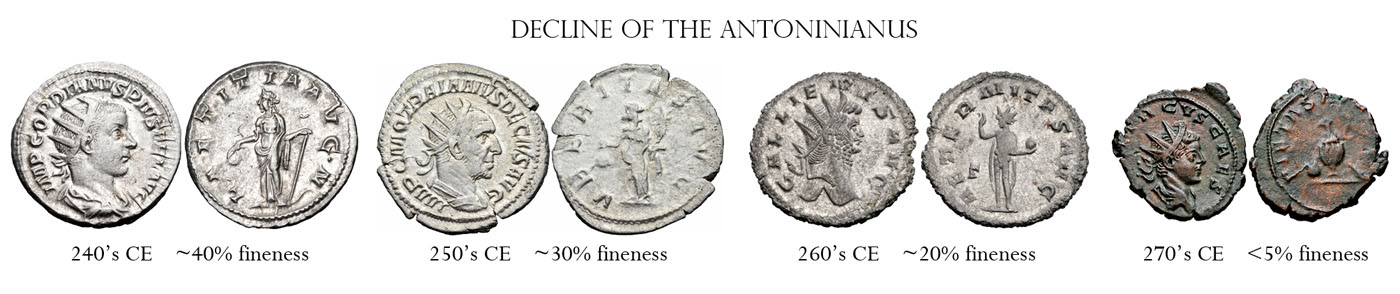
The rapid decline in silver purity of the antoninianus

Today most of these coins are extremely common finds, with a few scarcer examples including Aemilianus, Marcus Aurelius Marius, Quietus, and Regalianus. The rare issues of these short-lived emperors are catalogued in volume IV of the Roman Imperial Coinage (e.g. RIC IV Aemilian 1–100) and in the open catalogue Online Coins of the Roman Empire (OCRE).

Modern numismatists use "antoninianus" because it is not known what it was called in antiquity. An ancient Roman document called the Historia Augusta (of generally low reliability) refers to silver coins named after an Antoninus on several occasions (several Roman emperors in the late 2nd and early 3rd centuries bore this name). Because Caracalla's silver coin was a new issue, and he had taken Antoninus as part of his imperial name, an association (though likely false) was made with it, and the name stuck.
