= Flavius Antiochianus =

3rd century Roman senator and consul

Flavius Antiochianus (flourished 3rd century) was a prominent Roman politician during the reigns of the emperors Gallienus, Claudius Gothicus, Quintillus and Aurelian, in the period referred to as the Crisis of the Third Century in the Roman Empire.

== Life ==
Flavius Antiochianus was from a family of Greek descent from Antioch, Syria. The identity of his mother is unknown; however, his father was the Flavius Antiochianus who served as a prefect of a cohort in Germania Superior in 211, and subsequently in Mauretania Caesariensis, returning to Rome to serve as a praetorian prefect in 221 under the emperor Elagabalus.

The younger Antiochianus married a prominent and wealthy noblewoman, Pomponia Ummidia, sister of the Senator Pomponius Bassus. She was of Italian and Pontian Greek ancestry and a descendant of the former Nerva–Antonine dynasty.

Following their marriage, they lived at her large estate in Pisidia. Inscriptions have been found there with Antiochianus and Pomponia Ummidia named as the owners. It is unknown whether they had any children.

Sometime in 268–270, in the reign of Claudius Gothicus, Antiochianus served as a suffect consul and as a praefectus urbi. In 270 under Aurelian, he served a second ordinary consulship with the Emperor, and as a Praefectus urbi between 271-272 and then again 274. There is a possibility that during his second consulship, Antiochianus may have been responsible for the construction of the Balineum Antiochiani, one of the ancient baths (thermae) in Rome.

== Sources ==
- Lawrence Richardson, A new topographical dictionary of ancient Rome, (JHU Press, 1992)
- Alaric Watson, Aurelian the third century, (Routledge, 1999)
- Garrett G. Fagan, Bathing in Public in the Roman World (University of Michigan Press, 2002)
- William M. Ramsay, The Cities and Bishoprics of Phyrgia: Being an Essay of the Local History of Phrygia from the Earliest Times to the Turkish Conquest Vol. I, Part 1 (reprint, 2004)

Political offices
Preceded by Imp. Caesar M. Aurelius Claudius Augustus, and Paternus	Consul of the Roman Empire; 270 with Virius Orfitus	Succeeded by Imp. Caesar L. Domitius Aurelianus Augustus, and Pomponius Bassus
