= Aspasius Paternus =

3rd century Roman senator and governor

Aspasius Paternus (fl. 3rd century) was a Roman senator who was appointed consul twice.

== Biography ==
Aspasius Paternus was a member of the Paterni, a prominent senatorial family. He was appointed consul suffect sometime around AD 246. In AD 257, Paternus was assigned as the Proconsular governor of Africa. His next appointment was as Praefectus urbi of Rome, a position he held from AD 264 – 266. In AD 268, Paternus was appointed consul prior, alongside Marinianus. He may have been among the supporters of the emperor Gallienus who died in late 268 during the purge of Gallienus’ partisans by the incoming emperor Claudius Gothicus.

== Sources ==
- Christol, Michel, Essai sur l'évolution des carrières sénatoriales dans la seconde moitié du IIIe siècle ap. J.C. (1986)
- Martindale, John R.; Jones, A. H. M.; Morris, John, eds. (1971). The Prosopography of the Later Roman Empire: Volume I, AD 260–395. Cambridge: Cambridge University Press. ISBN 0-521-07233-6.

Political offices
Preceded by Uncertain	Consul suffectus of the Roman Empire around 246	Succeeded by Uncertain
Preceded by Ovinius Gaius Julius Aquilius Paternus VII, and Arcesilaus	Consul of the Roman Empire; 268 with Publius Licinius Egnatius Marinianus	Succeeded by Marcus Aurelius Claudius Augustus, and Paternus
