= Kyle Harper =

American historian and classicist (born 1979)

J. Kyle Harper (born December 29, 1979) is an American historian and classicist who specializes in ancient history, particularly that of ancient Rome. He is a professor of classics and letters at the University of Oklahoma (OU), where he holds the G.T. and Libby Blankenship Chair in the History of Liberty. Harper was provost of OU from 2014 to 2020.

== Early life and education ==
Kyle Harper was born in Norman, Oklahoma. In 2001, he graduated from the University of Oklahoma (OU) with a bachelor's degree in letters. In his final year of college Harper was named one of Oklahoma's two finalists for a Rhodes Scholarship. He went on to earn a MA (2003) and PhD (2007) from Harvard University. His doctoral thesis on Slavery in the Late Ancient Mediterranean was advised by Christopher P. Jones and Michael McCormick.

== Career ==
Upon graduating from Harvard, Harper was hired as an assistant professor at OU. In 2009 he was named the founding director of OU's Institute for the American Constitutional Heritage. He was promoted to be a full professor of classics and letters in 2014.

Harper also worked in university administration and was provost of the university from 2014 to 2020. After stepping down as provost, he returned to the university's academic faculty. In 2021, Harper was named the G.T. and Libby Blankenship Chair in the History of Liberty.

He became an external faculty member of the Santa Fe Institute.

== Books ==
- Slavery in the Late Roman World, AD 275–425 (2011)
- From Shame to Sin: The Christian Transformation of Sexual Morality in Late Antiquity (2013)
- The Fate of Rome: Climate, Disease, and the End of an Empire (2017)
- Plagues upon the Earth: Disease and the Course of Human History (2021)
- The Last Animal: Human History and the Fate of Life on Earth from the Ice Age to the Sixth Extinction (2026)

== Personal life ==
Harper has been married since 2007, and as of 2015 had two children. In 2015, Harper and his wife were confirmed as members of the Episcopal Church.
