= Michel Christol =

French historian (born 1942)

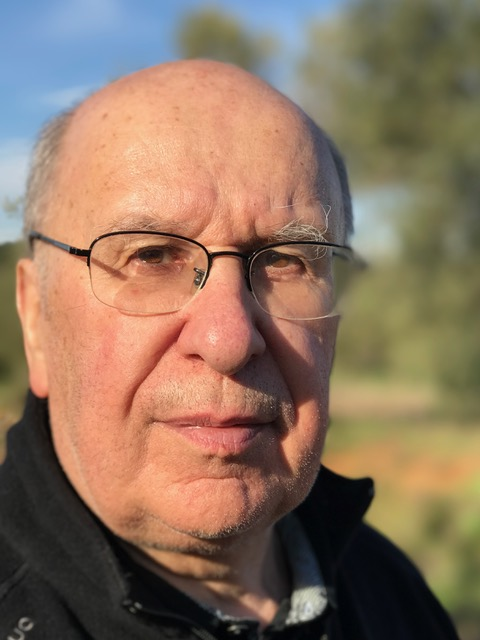
Image of Michel CHRISTOL

Michel Christol (25 October 1942, Castelnau-de-Guers) is a French historian, specialist of ancient Rome, and particularly epigraphy.

== Biography ==
Born in Herault, Michel Christol attended high school in Béziers then his university studies in Montpellier. A student of Hans-Georg Pflaum, Michel Christol devoted his thesis to the crisis of the Roman Empire under Valerian and Gallienus under the direction of William Seston then Charles Pietri, and defended it under the presidency of André Chastagnol. He became professor at the University of Paris-I in 1983, a position he held until his retirement in 2008.

In addition to his teaching duties, Michel Christol was director of the Publications de la Sorbonne from 1989 until 2000, as well as president of Gallia (journal).

Author of textbooks, including one co-written with Daniel Nony, constantly re-edited since its first publication in 1974, Michel Christol is an expert on Roman political history and the province of Gallia Narbonensis. He is known for his analyzes of epigraphic sources, particularly in terms of onomastics and prosopography.

== Publications ==
- 1974: (with Daniel Nony) Rome des origines aux invasions barbares, Paris
- 1986: Essai sur l'évolution des carrières sénatoriales dans la 2e moitié du IIIe s. ap. J.-C.
- 1987: (with Thomas Drew-Bear) Un castellum romain près d'Apamée de Phrygie, Osterreichische Akad. der Wissenschaften, Philosophisch-Hist. Kl., Denkschriften, 189. Band. Ergänzunsbande zu den Tituli Asiae Minoris, 12, Vienna.
- 1989: (with Andreina Magioncalda), Studi sui procuratori delle due Mauretaniae, Sassari (Pubblicazioni del Dipartimento di Storia dell'Univ. degli Studi di Sassari, 9)
- 1997: L'Empire romain du IIIe siècle. Histoire politique, 192-325 après J.-C., Paris
- 2003: (with Dominique Darde) La collection Séguier au Musée archéologique de Nîmes (Cahiers des musées et monuments n° 12), Nîmes
- 2005: Regards sur l’Afrique romaine, Paris
- 2005: Dissertation sur l’inscription de la Maison Carrée par Jean-François Séguier, Présentation et commentaire, Aix-en-Provence
- 2010: Une histoire provinciale. La Gaule narbonnaise de la fin du IIe siècle av. J.-C. au IIIe siècle ap. J.-C., Publications de la Sorbonne
