= Licinius Valerianus Minor =

Brother of Roman emperor Gallienus (died 268)

Licinius Valerianus Minor (died 268) was the second son of Roman emperor Valerian and half-brother of emperor Gallienus. His mother may have been named Cornelia Gallonia.

== Life ==
In a nundinium sometime between 253 and 264, he was made suffect consul and was appointed ordinary consul in 265. He likely functioned as a high-ranking dynastic presence in Rome to maintain his family's political grip on the Senate and appease the Roman aristocracy. He died in the wake of his brother's assassination in the autumn of 268 when he was consul with his relative Marinianus, in a purge against Gallienus' partisans; Joannes Zonaras reported that he was killed at Rome, whereas Eutropius and the Historia Augusta state that he was murdered at Mediolanum.

== Family tree ==
Aulus Egnatius Priscillianus philosopher
Quintus Egnatius Proculus consul suffectus	Lucius Egnatius Victor
Egnatius Victor Marinianus consul suffectus	1.Egnatia Mariniana	Valerian; Roman Emperor; 253-260	2.Cornelia Gallonia
previous Aemilianus; Roman Emperor; 253	(1) Gallienus; Roman Emperor; 253-268 ∞ Cornelia Salonina	(2) Valerianus Minor consul suffectus	Claudius Gothicus; Roman Emperor; 268-270	Quintillus; Roman Emperor; 270	next Aurelian; Roman Emperor; 270-275
Valerian II caesar	Saloninus co-emperor	Marinianus consul 268

Political offices
Preceded by Gallienus; Saturninus	Roman consul 265 with Egnatius Lucillus	Succeeded by Gallienus; Sabinillus
