= Saloninus =

Roman emperor in 260

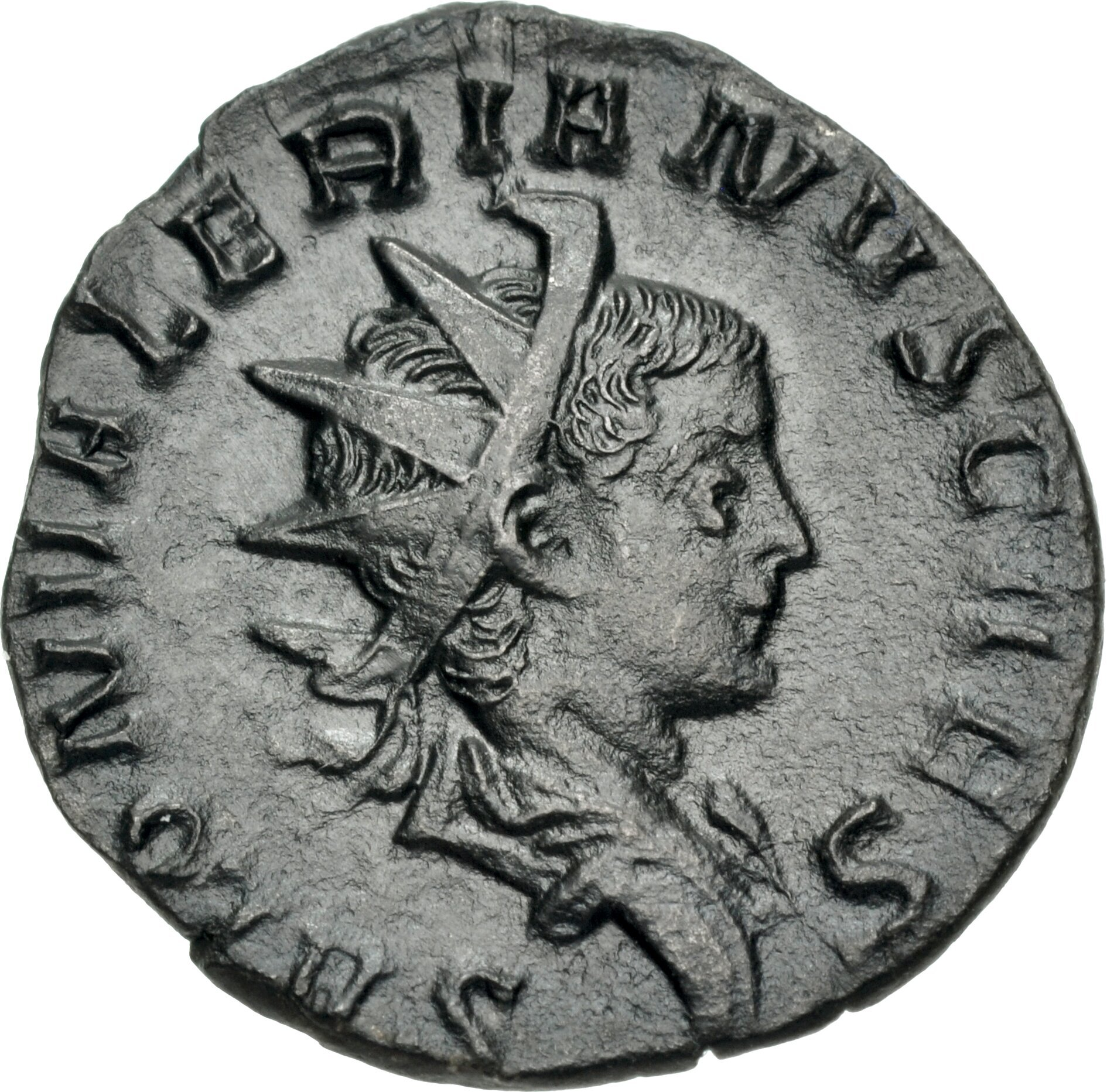

Roman emperor
- Augustus Caesar: July (?) 260 (briefly); 258–260
- Predecessor: Gallienus
- Successor: Postumus as Gallic Emperor
- Died: 260; Colonia Agrippina
Names
- Publius Licinius Cornelius Saloninus Valerianus
Regnal name
- Imperator Caesar Publius Cornelius Licinius Saloninus Valerianus Pius Felix Invictus Augustus
- Dynasty: Valerian
- Father: Gallienus
- Mother: Cornelia Salonina

Publius Licinius Cornelius Saloninus Valerianus (died 260), typically just called Saloninus, was a young Roman nobleman who briefly became emperor in 260. The grandson of Valerian I, Saloninus was appointed caesar (heir) in 258 in an attempt to shore up the Licinian line of succession during the Crisis of the Third Century. During his time in power, Saloninus administered the German marches out of Cologne. Nevertheless, Saloninus soon became embroiled in a dispute with future Gallic emperor Postumus over war spoils. In 260, Saloninus' troops acclaimed him augustus (emperor) in an unsuccessful bid for political legitimacy; Postumus killed Saloninus shortly thereafter.

== Early life ==
Saloninus' father was the emperor Gallienus, his mother Cornelia Salonina, a Greek from Bithynia. In 258 Saloninus was appointed Caesar by his father (just like his older brother Valerian II, who had died around 258) and sent to Gaul to make sure his father's authority was respected there (the title Caesar in Imperial nomenclature indicated that the holder was the Crown Prince and first in line of succession after the Augustus, the title reserved for the ruling Emperor). Like Valerian II, who was made the ward of Ingenuus, governor of the Illyrian provinces, Saloninus was put under the protection of the praetorian prefect Silvanus (otherwise named as Albanus). As Caesar in Gaul, Saloninus had his main seat in Cologne.

== Reign ==
Bray conjectures that Saloninus's appointment as Caesar, like that of his elder brother, Valerian II, in Illyria, was made at the instigation of Valerian I who was, simultaneously, the senior Emperor (Augustus) and grandfather of the two young Caesars and, as head of the Licinius clan, exercised also the patria potestas over all members of the Imperial family, including his son Gallienus, his co-Emperor (and co-Augustus). Bray suggests that Valerian's motive in making these appointments was securing the succession and establishing a lasting imperial dynasty. It is not known how Valerian envisaged his grandson interacting with the existing governors and military commanders of the Gallic provinces. There is no reason to suppose that he planned as systematically as Diocletian when he established the Tetrarchy some thirty years later. However, Silvanus must have been a seasoned soldier and administrator, and he does seem to have harboured the notion that, as guardian of Saloninus, he should exercise real authority in Gaul. This was demonstrated by the circumstances in which he fell out with the Gallic emperor Postumus.

In 260 (probably in July) Silvanus (no doubt in Saloninus's name) ordered Postumus to hand over some booty that Postumus's troops had seized from a German warband which had been on its way home from a successful raid into Gaul. However, Postumus's men took violent exception to this attempt to enforce the rights of the representative of a distant emperor who was manifestly failing in his duty to protect the Gallic provinces. Asserting what was probably the prevailing custom of the frontier, they turned on Saloninus and Silvanus, who had to then flee to Cologne with some loyal troops. It was probably at this time that Postumus was acclaimed emperor by his army. Riding the tide of military discontent which he could barely control, Postumus then besieged Saloninus and Silvanus in Cologne.

== Death ==
Gallienus, who was fully engaged elsewhere – probably campaigning on the middle Danube – could do nothing to save his son (by this time Saloninus's grandfather, the senior Emperor Valerian, was probably already a captive of the Persian King Shapur I). Saloninus's troops, in their desperation, finally proclaimed him emperor, perhaps hoping that this would induce Postumus's army to desert him and join them in a bid for Empire – i.e., against Valerian and Gallienus. If this was indeed their hope, they were to be disappointed, for Postumus's army pressed on with the siege and, about one month later, the citizens of Colonia Agrippina handed Saloninus and his guardian over to their enemy. Postumus may have been unable to prevent his army from murdering them. Despite his public protestations of regret, it seems unlikely that Postumus made a serious effort to resist this course of events.

Whether or not Gallienus ever concurred with Valerian's dynastic experiment is not known. The murder of Saloninus, so soon after the suspicious death of Valerian II, seems to have cured Gallienus of any ambition in this regard. Throughout the period of his sole reign, Gallienus made no effort to elevate his third son, Egnatius Marinianus, to the purple or associate him in any way with his government of the Empire – although he did allow him to be elected to the largely ceremonial office of Consul in 268.

== Coinage and portraiture ==
Christopher Entwistle and Noël Adams have argued that a grey and white sardonyx kept in Munich that is generally thought to depict Philip II may actually be of Saloninus.

== Family tree ==
Aulus Egnatius Priscillianus philosopher
Quintus Egnatius Proculus consul suffectus	Lucius Egnatius Victor
Egnatius Victor Marinianus consul suffectus	1.Mariniana	Valerian; Roman Emperor; 253-260	2.Cornelia Gallonia
previous Aemilianus; Roman Emperor; 253	(1) Gallienus; Roman Emperor; 253-268 ∞ Cornelia Salonina	(2) Valerianus Minor consul suffectus	Claudius Gothicus; Roman Emperor; 268-270	Quintillus; Roman Emperor; 270	next Aurelian; Roman Emperor; 270-275
Valerian II caesar	Saloninus co-emperor	Marinianus consul 268

Regnal titles
Preceded by Gallienus	Roman Emperor; 260; Served alongside: Gallienus	Succeeded by Gallienus
