= Valerian II =

Roman emperor from 256 to 258

- Caesar
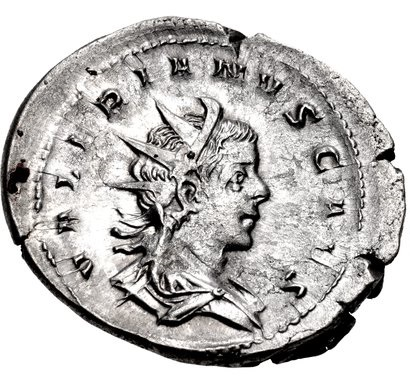
- Antoninianus of Valerian II

Caesar of the Roman Empire
- Reign: 256–258
- Successor: Saloninus
- Emperors: Valerian; Gallienus
- Died: 258
Names
- Publius Licinius Cornelius Valerianus
- Dynasty: Valerian
- Father: Gallienus
- Mother: Cornelia Salonina

Publius Licinius Cornelius Valerianus (died 258), also known as Valerian II (/vəˈlɪəriən/), was the eldest son of Roman Emperor Gallienus and Augusta Cornelia Salonina who was of Greek origin and grandson of the Emperor Valerian who was of a noble and traditional senatorial family.

== Life ==
Shortly after his acclamation as Emperor (Augustus) Valerian made Gallienus his co-Emperor and his grandson, Valerian, Caesar, in 256. (For a discussion of the dynastic politics that motivated this process, see the related article on Saloninus).

The young Caesar was then established in Sirmium to represent the Licinius family in the government of the troubled Illyrian provinces, while Gallienus transferred his attentions to Germany to deal with barbarian incursions into Gaul. Because of his youth (he was probably no more than fifteen at the time), Valerian was put under the guardianship of Ingenuus, who seems to have held an extraordinary command as governor of the Illyrian provinces, i.e. Upper and Lower Pannonia and Upper and Lower Moesia.

It is reported that Salonina was not happy with this arrangement. Although she could not publicly dispute the decisions of Valerian, the pater patriae which had been formally agreed by her husband, Gallienus, she suspected Ingenuus's motives and asked an officer called Valentinus, otherwise unknown, to keep an eye on him. Despite this precaution, Valerian died in early 258 in circumstances sufficiently suspicious for Gallienus to attempt to demote Ingenuus. It was this action that sparked the attempted usurpation of the Empire by Ingenuus, who had widespread support among the Illyrian garrisons and the provincial establishment.

As in case of his brother, Saloninus, who was later made Caesar in Gaul, the little we know of Valerian's short reign in Illyria is indicative of the chaotic situation that prevailed on the northern frontiers of the Empire under Valerian and Gallienus. It seems to show that the mere presence of a member of the Imperial House in a troubled region was not sufficient to assuage local fears of being neglected by the distant Emperor. The local Caesar had to wield undisputed authority in his region and command the resources and the experience to deal with the internal and external threats to its security. Diocletian and Maximian seem to have understood this when they set up Constantius Chlorus and Galerius as Caesars in Gaul and Illyria respectively some thirty-five years later.

== Family tree of Licinia gens ==
Aulus Egnatius Priscillianus philosopher
Quintus Egnatius Proculus consul suffectus	Lucius Egnatius Victor
Egnatius Victor Marinianus consul suffectus	1.Mariniana	Valerian; Roman Emperor; 253-260	2.Cornelia Gallonia
previous Aemilianus; Roman Emperor; 253	(1) Gallienus; Roman Emperor; 253-268 ∞ Cornelia Salonina	(2) Valerianus Minor consul suffectus	Claudius Gothicus; Roman Emperor; 268-270	Quintillus; Roman Emperor; 270	next Aurelian; Roman Emperor; 270-275
Valerian II caesar	Saloninus co-emperor	Publius Licinius Egnatius Marinianus consul 268

== Bibliography ==
- Vagi, David L. (2000). Coinage and History of the Roman Empire, c. 82 B.C.– A.D. 480. Chicago: Fitzroy Dearborn. ISBN 9781579583163.
