= Fire in the East (novel) =

2008 historical novel by Harry Sidebottom

- Author: Harry Sidebottom
- Language: English
- Series: Warrior of Rome Series
- Genre: Historical novels
- Publication date: 2008
- Publication place: United Kingdom
- Media type: Print (Hardcover and Paperback)
- Preceded by: none
- Followed by: King of Kings

Fire in the East is a historical novel in the Warrior of Rome Series by Harry Sidebottom, first published in 2008. It is the first novel in the series, focusing on the exploits of Marcus Clodius Ballista (a fictionalized version of Balista, or Callistus), a Roman military officer originally of the Germanic Angles, during the military and political Crisis of the Third Century.

Fire in the East spent five weeks on the United Kingdom's Top 10 list upon its release in 2008, and has since sold over 100,000 copies.

== Plot summary ==
=== Prologue ===
During the civil war of AD 238, the Emperor Maximinus Thrax is killed in his tent outside the Northern Italian town of Aquileia. The assassin is a young soldier named Ballista, who has been coerced into acting by the other conspirators, out of fear for his and his own family's safety.

=== The story ===
Ballista, aged thirty-four, now an eques and a distinguished soldier in the service of the Emperor Valerian and his son Gallienus, is appointed Dux Ripae, the military commander of the Empire's eastern frontier, between the Euphrates and Tigris rivers. His task is to prepare the small fortified town of Arete, on the banks of the Euphrates, for an attack by the invading armies of the Sassanid Persians, under Shapur I. Despite the eminence of his position, he is expected to accomplish this with only the troops of the town's garrison, and whatever levies he can borrow from the surrounding potentates - an impossible task.

Traveling with his familia (entourage) and a siege engineer, Mamurra, he embarks on a trireme from Brundisium to Antioch, and then over land to Arete. There, in addition to the shortage of troops, he is forced to cope with the arrogance of his subordinate officers (who, since he was originally a diplomatic hostage from the Angles tribe, consider him a barbarian), and the divides between the various religious, national and political factions that control the town's government. Early attempts to sabotage the town's supply depot and granaries also make it clear that there are several Persian sympathizers inside.

Under Ballista's direction, the town is prepared for a siege before the arrival of the Persian army, outnumbering the defenders by at least ten to one and led by Shapur in person. Thanks to Ballista's preparations, the Persians' several assaults are stymied over the course of several months, and Ballista becomes hopeful that the town can survive until autumn, when a relief army is expected to arrive.

Unfortunately, the defeat of the Persians' "last" assault makes the defenders overconfident, and they fall into drunken celebration. On that night, a fanatic Christian priest, inviting punishment of all the "sinners" inside the town, guides the Persians to a tunnel underneath the walls, and the city is overrun. Ballista barely manages to escape with his entourage, a few soldiers, and the daughter of one of the town councilors.

As he watches Arete burn from afar, Ballista reflects that he has failed to hold the town, but bitterly realizes that he was never meant to; the Empire is already engaged in other wars on two different fronts, and no relief force was dispatched to the East. Ballista's mission was simply to delay the Persian advance; in that respect he has succeeded, but his surviving the mission rather than dying is likely to embarrass the Emperor and make Ballista a political liability. Turning his thoughts to the immediate future, Ballista leads his small party away from the sack.

== Characters ==
- Marcus Clodius Ballista, Dux Ripae
- Calgacus, Ballista's manservant
- Maximus, Ballista's bodyguard
- Demetrius, Ballista's military secretary
- Bagoas, Persian interpreter, purchased at the slave market in Delos
