= Silvanus (praetorian prefect) =

3rd century Roman praetorian prefect

Silvanus was a Roman soldier and probably praetorian prefect during the third century who came briefly to the notice of history in the reign of Valerian and his co-Emperor Gallienus. He is generally assumed to have been the commander of the praetorians under Gallienus.

However, the sources only tell us that he was made the guardian of the Caesar Saloninus by Saloninus's father, the Emperor Gallienus. This seems likely to mean that he exercised a guiding influence over his young protégé as he represented the Imperial Dynasty in the government of the Gallic provinces. In this respect Silvanus may be compared with Ingenuus who seems to have exercised a similar function, in loco parentis, in the command of the Danubian provinces by Saloninus's elder brother, the Caesar Valeriannus, earlier in the 250s. He would not have been given this office had he not been a seasoned soldier and administrator, but this does not mean that he was Gallienus's Praetorian Prefect.

It was Parker who supposed that Silvanus must have held that office. This suggestion has since been generally accepted without question by academic opinion. However, while his command was clearly above that of a provincial governor, there is no proof that this was the case. Being Praetorian Prefect was not a necessary condition of being made the guardian of a Licinian Dynasty Caesar: it has never been seriously suggested that Ingenuus, who seems to have been similarly in loco parentis in respect of Saloninus's brother, the Caesar Valerian in the Danubian provinces, was so honoured.

Praetorian Prefect or not, in 260 Silvanus fell into dispute with Postumus over the disposition of loot which the latter had seized from a group of German raiders in Gaul. Postumus's army, infuriated, then proclaimed their man Emperor and attacked Silvanus and the young Caesar in Colonia Claudia Ara Agrippinensium (modernday Cologne). The pair were eventually given up by the citizens and killed by Postumus's men.
