= Nummia gens =

Ancient Roman family

The gens Nummia was a plebeian family at ancient Rome. Members of this gens appear almost exclusively under the Empire. During the third century, they frequently obtained the highest offices of the Roman state.

== Praenomina ==
Little can be said about the praenomina of the early Nummii, for nearly all of the Nummii Albini, the only prominent family, bore the praenomen Marcus, and were distinguished from one another by their various other names. The only other praenomen occurring among the Nummii who appear in history is Titus, although in inscriptions we also find Lucius, Gaius, Publius, and Quintus.

== Branches and cognomina ==
The main family of the Nummii bore the surname Albinus, "whitish", an old and honourable cognomen long associated with aristocratic Roman families. Members of this family bore additional surnames, such as Senecio ("old man"), Justus ("just, upright"), Dexter ("right, fortunate"), and Tuscus ("Etruscan"). Besides these, one of the early Nummii adds Gallus, a surname that can be translated as either "cockerel" or "Gaul", and perhaps Rusticus ("rural, rustic").

== Members ==
This list includes abbreviated praenomina. For an explanation of this practice, see filiation.

- Titus Rustius Nummius Gallus, consul suffectus in AD 34.
- Didius Nummius Albinus, the brother or half-brother of Marcus Didius Severus Julianus, emperor in AD 193. He was probably put to death by Septimius Severus. He may have been the father of Marcus Nummius Umbrius Primus Senecio Albinus, consul in AD 206.
- Marcus Nummius M. f. Umbrius Primus Senecio Albinus, consul in AD 206, had been one of the Salii Palatini. He married Vibia Salvia Varia, and was the father of Marcus Nummius Senecio Albinus, consul in AD 227, and Nummia Varia. Marcus Nummius Justus may have been another son.
- Marcus Nummius M. f. M. n. Senecio Albinus, consul in AD 227, was the step-brother of Lucius Roscius Aelianus Paculus Salvius Julianus, consul in AD 223. Senecio was the father of Marcus Nummius Tuscus, consul in AD 258, and perhaps also of Marcus Nummius Albinus, consul in 263.
- Nummia M. f. M. n. Varia, daughter of the consul of 206, was a priestess of Venus Felix. In AD 242, she was assigned the prefecture of Peltuinum.
- Marcus Nummius Justus, perhaps a son of the consul of 206.
- Nummius (M. f. M. n.) Albinus, (Note: This Nummius may be identified with the praefectus urbi "Ceionius Albinus" whom the Historia Augusta alleges received a letter from Valerian. Syme says the letter is a fabrication, and notes that the name Ceionius is not otherwise attested for him specifically, although a union between the Ceionii and Nummii dates from around this period.) a senator, served as consul in an uncertain year, circa AD 240. He was praefectus urbi in 256, during the reign of Valerian, and again from 261 to 263. He was consul for the second time in 263. He is probably the same Albinus who died as an old man under Aurelian.
- Marcus Nummius Attidius Senecio Albinus, possibly identical with Nummius Albinus, consul in 263.
- Marcus Nummius M. f. M. n. Tuscus, consul in AD 258, was probably the father of Nummius Tuscus, consul in 295.
- Nummius Faustianus, consul in AD 262.
- Marcus Nummius Ceionius Annius Albinus, praetor urbanus in the late 3rd century. He was likely a son of Albinus, consul in 263.
- Nummius (M. f. M. n.) Tuscus, consul in AD 295, and praefectus urbi from 302 to 303.
- Nummius Albinus, dedicated an altar to Jupiter Serenus at Rome, perhaps in the late 3rd or early 4th century.
- Nummius Albinus, named in pottery fragments from Carthage, together with Nummius Tuscus.
- Nummius Tuscus, named in pottery fragments from Carthage, together with Nummius Albinus. Possibly identical with the consuls of 258 or 295.
- Marcus Nummius Albinus signo Triturrius, consul in AD 345.
- Nummius M.f. Secundus, son of Albinus Triturrius.
- Nummius Aemilianus Dexter, proconsul of Asia between AD 379 and 387, and praetorian prefect of Italy in 395.

== See also ==
- List of Roman gentes

== Bibliography ==
- Chronograph of 354.
- Aelius Lampridius, Aelius Spartianus, Flavius Vopiscus, Julius Capitolinus, Trebellius Pollio, and Vulcatius Gallicanus, Historia Augusta (Augustan History).
- Dictionary of Greek and Roman Biography and Mythology, William Smith, ed., Little, Brown and Company, Boston (1849).
- Theodor Mommsen et alii, Corpus Inscriptionum Latinarum (The Body of Latin Inscriptions, abbreviated CIL), Berlin-Brandenburgische Akademie der Wissenschaften (1853–present).
- George Davis Chase, "The Origin of Roman Praenomina", in Harvard Studies in Classical Philology, vol. VIII (1897).
- Paul von Rohden, Elimar Klebs, & Hermann Dessau, Prosopographia Imperii Romani (The Prosopography of the Roman Empire, abbreviated PIR), Berlin (1898).
- Syme, Ronald, Ammianus and the Historia Augusta, Oxford University Press (1968).
- Jones, A.H.M.; J.R. Martindale & J. Morris (1971–1992). Prosopography of the Later Roman Empire. Cambridge University Press. ISBN 0-521-07233-6.
- August Pauly; Georg Wissowa; Wilhelm Kroll; Kurt Witte; Karl Mittelhaus; Konrat Ziegler, eds. (1894–1980). Paulys Realencyclopädie der classischen Altertumswissenschaft. Stuttgart: J. B. Metzler.
- John C. Traupman, The New College Latin & English Dictionary, Bantam Books, New York (1995).
