= Gallonia gens =

The Gallonia gens was a minor ancient Roman gente known from the republican and imperial periods.

== Members ==
- Gaius Gallonius, governor of the city of Gades during Caesar's Civil War
- Gaius Gallonius Fronto Quintus Marcius Turbo, Roman governor of Thrace in 152
- Gallonius Basilius, friend of emperor Gallienus mentioned in the dubiously reliable Historia Augusta
- Gallonius Avitus, legate of Thrace under emperor Aurelian
- Gallonia C.f. Octavia Marcella, senatorial woman from Utica, and wife of Lucius Accius Julianus Asclepianus, and mother of Accia Heuresis Venantia and Accia Asclepianilla Castorea

== See also ==
- Gallia gens
- Cornelia Gallonia, possible Roman empress
