= Alcimus (disambiguation) =

Alcimus was a high priest in Jerusalem in the 2nd century BC.

Alcimus may also refer to:

== People ==
- Alcimus (mythology), several figures in Greek mythology
- Alcimus (rhetorician), 3rd-century BC Greek rhetorician
- Alcimus Alethius, 4th-century AD Latin poet
- Avitus of Vienne, 6th-century bishop, also known as Saint Alcimus Ecdicius Avitus

== Other uses ==
- Alcimus (fly), a genus of robber flies in the family Asilidae

== See also ==
- Alkimos (disambiguation)
