= Gallonius Avitus =

Roman legate of the 3rd century

Gallonius Avitus was legate over the provinces of Thrace under the ancient Roman emperor Aurelian, and a letter addressed to him by that emperor is quoted by Flavius Vopiscus in the Historia Augusta.

Some critics have supposed, that he was the author of an allocutio sponsalis, in five hexameters, preserved among the fragmenta epithalamiorum veterum, and that the little poem itself was one of the hundred nuptial lays which were composed and recited when Gallienus celebrated the marriages of his nephews. The 18th-century scholar Johann Christian Wernsdorf, however, considers that the lines belong to Alcimus Alethius.

Some scholars have gone so far as to suggest that he was a fictitious creation of the authors of the Historia Augusta.

== See also ==
- Gallonia gens
