= Marcus Nummius Albinus =

Roman senator and consul (c.200-c.274)

Marcus Nummius Albinus (possibly Marcus Nummius Attidius Senecio Albinus) (c. AD 200 – c. AD 274) was a Roman senator who was appointed consul twice, first as a suffectus sometime around AD 240, and secondly as an ordinarius in AD 263.

== Biography ==
Nummius Albinus was possibly the son of Marcus Nummius Senecio Albinus who had been consul in AD 227. He, in turn, was appointed suffect consul before AD 256, possibly around AD 240, during which time he may have been honoured by a statue erected at Adada in Pisidia. In AD 256, he was appointed the Praefectus urbi of Rome. He held this post a second time under the emperor Gallienus, from 261 to 263, and was elevated to the office of consul prior alongside an otherwise unidentifiable individual named Dexter or perhaps Maximus Dexter in 263.

Nummius Albinus may also have been the Albinus who was either Praeses or legatus proconsulis in Lycia et Pamphylia. It is assumed that he was the Albinus who died of old age during the reign of Aurelian. He was perhaps the brother of Marcus Nummius Tuscus who was consul ordinarius in AD 258, and he may have been the father of Marcus Nummius Ceionius Annius Albinus, who was probably Praetor urbanus during the reign of Diocletian.

== Sources ==
- Martindale, John R.; Jones, A. H. M.; Morris, John, eds. (1971). The Prosopography of the Later Roman Empire: Volume I, AD 260–395. Cambridge: Cambridge University Press. ISBN 0-521-07233-6.
- Mennen, Inge, Power and Status in the Roman Empire, AD 193-284 (2011)

Political offices
Preceded by Gallienus Augustus V Nummius Faustianus	Roman consul 263 with Dexter	Succeeded by Gallienus Augustus VI; Saturninus
