= Cornelia Salonina =

Roman empress from 253 to 268

- Augusta
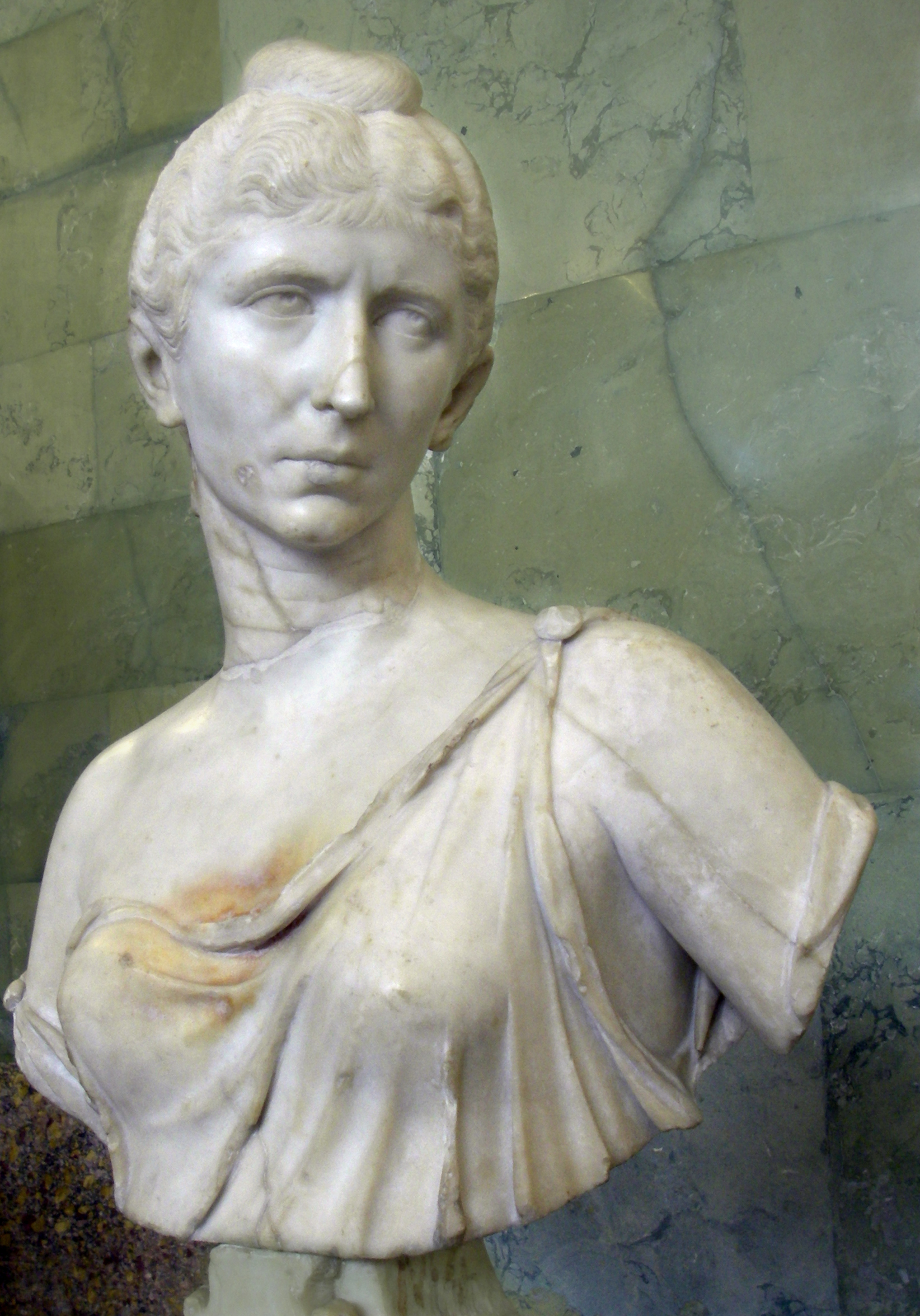
- Marble bust of Cornelia Salonina

Empress of the Roman Empire
- Tenure: 253 – 268
- Born: Possibly Bithynia
- Died: 268 (disputed); Mediolanum, Italia (disputed)
- Spouse: Gallienus
- Issue: Valerianus; Saloninus; Marinianus
Names
- Publia Licinia Julia Cornelia Salonina
Regnal name
- Julia Publia Licinia Cornelia Salonina Augusta
- Dynasty: Valerian

Publia Licinia Julia Cornelia Salonina (died 268, Mediolanum) was an Augusta of the Roman Empire, married to Roman Emperor Gallienus and mother of Valerian II, Saloninus, and Marinianus.

== Life ==
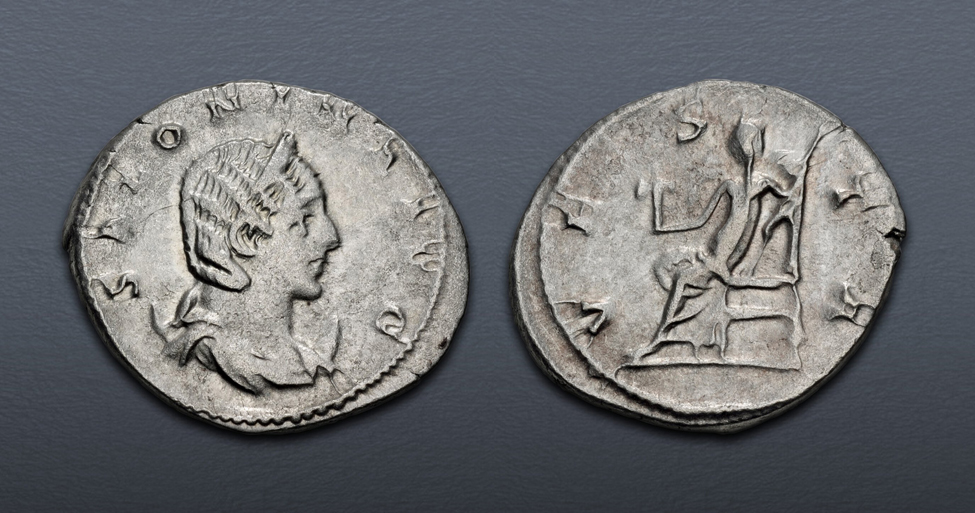
Antoninianus with bust of Salonina

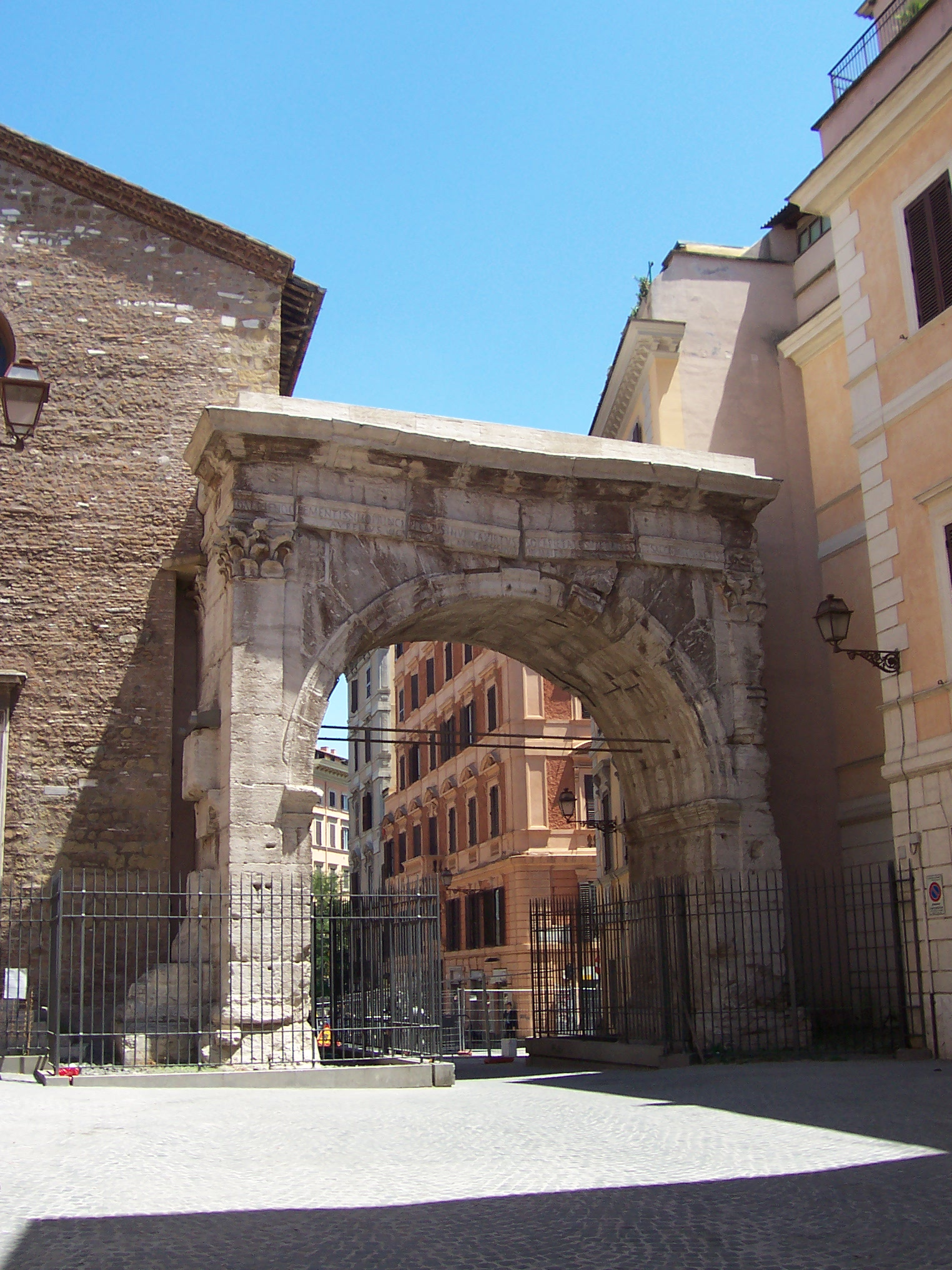
This arch, a gate in the Servian Walls of Rome, was dedicated to Gallienus and SALONINAE SANCTISSIMAE AUG, "to Salonina, most holy Augusta".

Salonina's origin is unknown. One modern theory is that she was born of Greek origin in Bithynia, then part of the province of Bithynia et Pontus, Asia Minor. However, there exists some scepticism on that. There has been speculation that she was related to a senator named Publius Cornelius Saecularis of Salona. She may also have been related to her father-in-law's possible second wife Cornelia Gallonia, and possibly to the previous empress Julia Cornelia Paula.

She married Gallienus about ten years before his accession to the throne. When her husband became joint-emperor with his father Valerian in 253, Salonina was named Augusta.

Salonina was the mother of three princes, Valerian II, Saloninus and Marinianus. Her fate after Gallienus was murdered during the siege of Mediolanum in 268 is unknown. One theory is that her life was spared; another is that she was executed together with other members of her family, at the orders of the Senate of Rome.

Her name is reported on coins with Latin legend as Cornelia Salonina; however, from the Greek coinage come the names Iulia Cornelia Salonina, Publia Licinia Cornelia Salonina, and Salonina Chrysogona (an attribute that means "begotten of gold"). The names "Publia Licinia" were probably added to her name to mirror her husband whose two first names were "Publius Licinius".

== Bibliography ==
- Bray, John. Gallienus : A Study in Reformist and Sexual Politics, Wakefield Press, Kent Town, 1997, ISBN 1-86254-337-2
- "Salonina", Dictionary of Greek and Roman Antiquities, edited William Smith (1870).
- Partial Salonina coinage
- "Dictionary of Roman Coins", by Seth William Stevenson (1889).

Royal titles
Preceded by Cornelia Supera	Empress of Rome; 253–268	Succeeded by Ulpia Severa
Preceded by Herennia Etruscilla	Empress-Mother of Rome; 260	Succeeded by Eutropia
