= Egnatius Lucillus =

Roman senator and consul (died 268)

Egnatius Lucillus (died 268) was a Roman senator.

== Biography ==
Lucillus was a relative of the Roman emperor, Gallienus, who was appointed consul posterior in 265 alongside Valerianus Minor. Nothing else is recorded about his career. It is assumed that he was one of the relatives of Gallienus murdered at Rome in 268, after the assassination of Gallienus.

It has been speculated that Lucillus was son of Egnatius Lucillianus and the father of an Egnatius Lollianus, married to a Flavia, daughter of a Quintus Flavius and wife a Maesia, the parents, speculated by his name, of Quintus Flavius Maesius Egnatius Lollianus Mavortius, and Egnatia Lolliana, wife of Rufius Caecina Postumianus. However, a familial relationship between the imperial members of the gens Egnatii and Egnatius Lucillianus has been described as "extremely doubtful".

== Sources ==
- Martindale, John R.; Jones, A. H. M.; Morris, John, eds. (1971). The Prosopography of the Later Roman Empire: Volume I, AD 260–395. Cambridge: Cambridge University Press. ISBN 0-521-07233-6.
- Mennen, Inge, Power and Status in the Roman Empire, 193–284 AD (2011)

Political offices
Preceded by Gallienus; Saturninus	Consul of the Roman Empire; 265 AD; With: Valerianus Minor	Succeeded by Gallienus; Sabinillus
