= Gallienus =

Roman emperor from 253 to 268

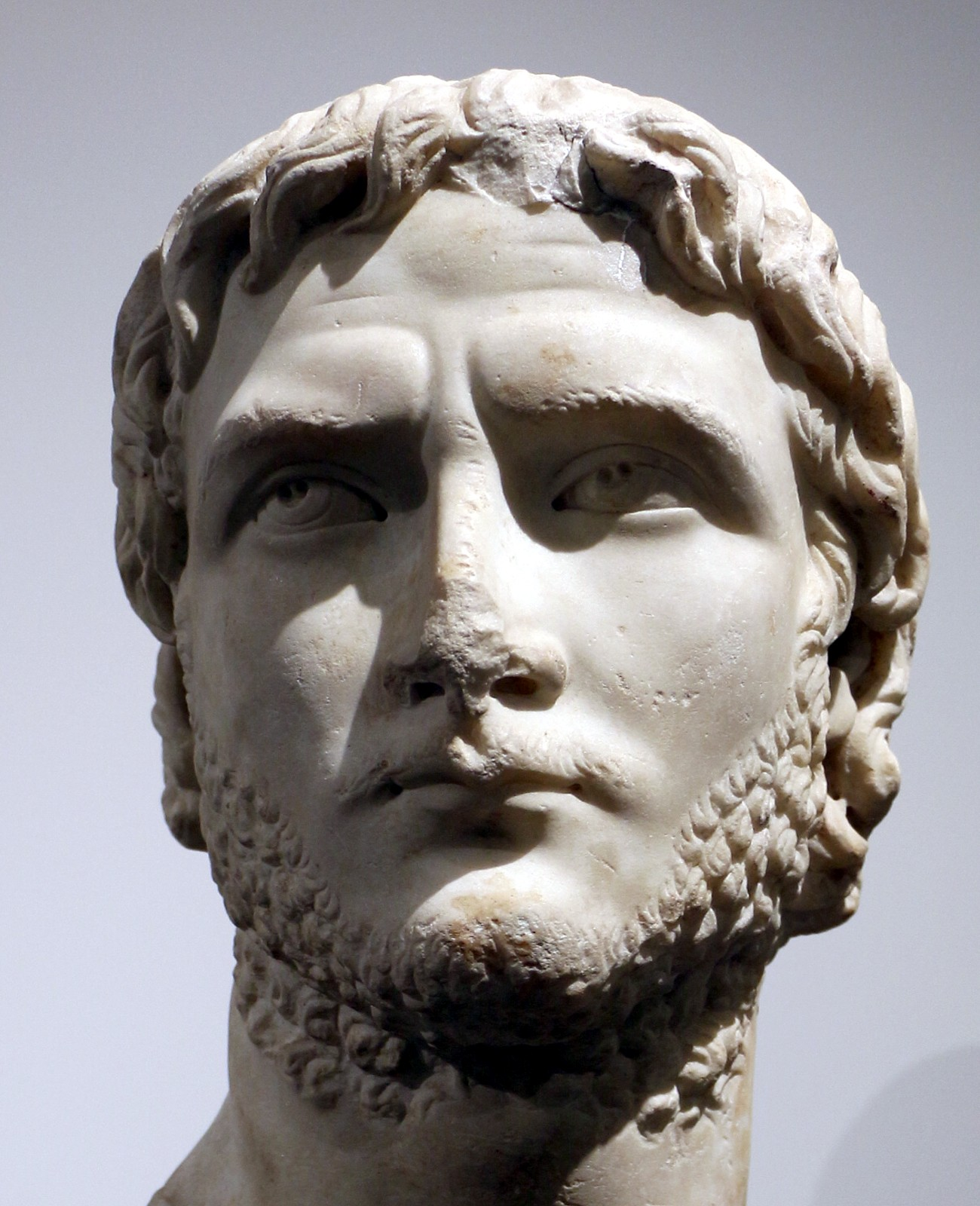
- Bust in the Palatine Museum (formerly in the Museo Nazionale Romano), c. 262

Roman emperor
- Reign: September 253 – September 268
- Predecessor: Aemilianus
- Successor: Claudius Gothicus
- Co-emperor: Valerian (253–260); Saloninus (July 260)
- Born: c. 218; Roman Empire
- Died: September 268 (aged 50); Mediolanum, Italia, Roman Empire
- Spouse: Cornelia Salonina; Pipara (concubine)
- Issue Detail: Valerianus; Saloninus; Marinianus
Names
- Publius Licinius Egnatius Gallienus
Regnal name
- Imperator Caesar Publius Licinius Egnatius Gallienus Augustus
- Dynasty: Valerian dynasty
- Father: Valerian
- Mother: Egnatia Mariniana

Gallienus (English: /ˌɡæliˈiːnəs/, Latin pronunciation: [galliˈeːnʊs]; Latin: Publius Licinius Egnatius Gallienus; c. 218 – September 268) was Roman emperor with his father Valerian from 253 to 260 and alone from 260 to 268. He ruled during the Crisis of the Third Century that nearly caused the collapse of the empire. He won numerous military victories against usurpers and Germanic tribes, but was unable to prevent the secession of important provinces. His 15-year reign was the longest in half a century.

Born into a wealthy and traditional senatorial family, Gallienus was the son of Valerian and Mariniana. Valerian became Emperor in September 253 and had the Roman Senate elevate Gallienus to the rank of Augustus. Valerian divided the empire between him and his son, with Valerian ruling the east and his son the west. Gallienus defeated the usurper Ingenuus in 258 and destroyed an Alemanni army at Mediolanum in 259.

The defeat and capture of Valerian at Edessa in 260 by the Sasanian Empire threw the Roman Empire into the chaos of civil war. Control of the whole empire passed to Gallienus. He defeated the eastern usurpers Macrianus Major and Lucius Mussius Aemilianus in 261–262 but failed to stop the formation of the breakaway Gallic Empire under general Postumus. Aureolus, another usurper, proclaimed himself emperor in Mediolanum in 268 but was defeated outside the city by Gallienus and besieged inside. While the siege was ongoing, Gallienus was assassinated, stabbed to death by the officer Cecropius, as part of a conspiracy.

== Early life ==
=== Youth and family ===
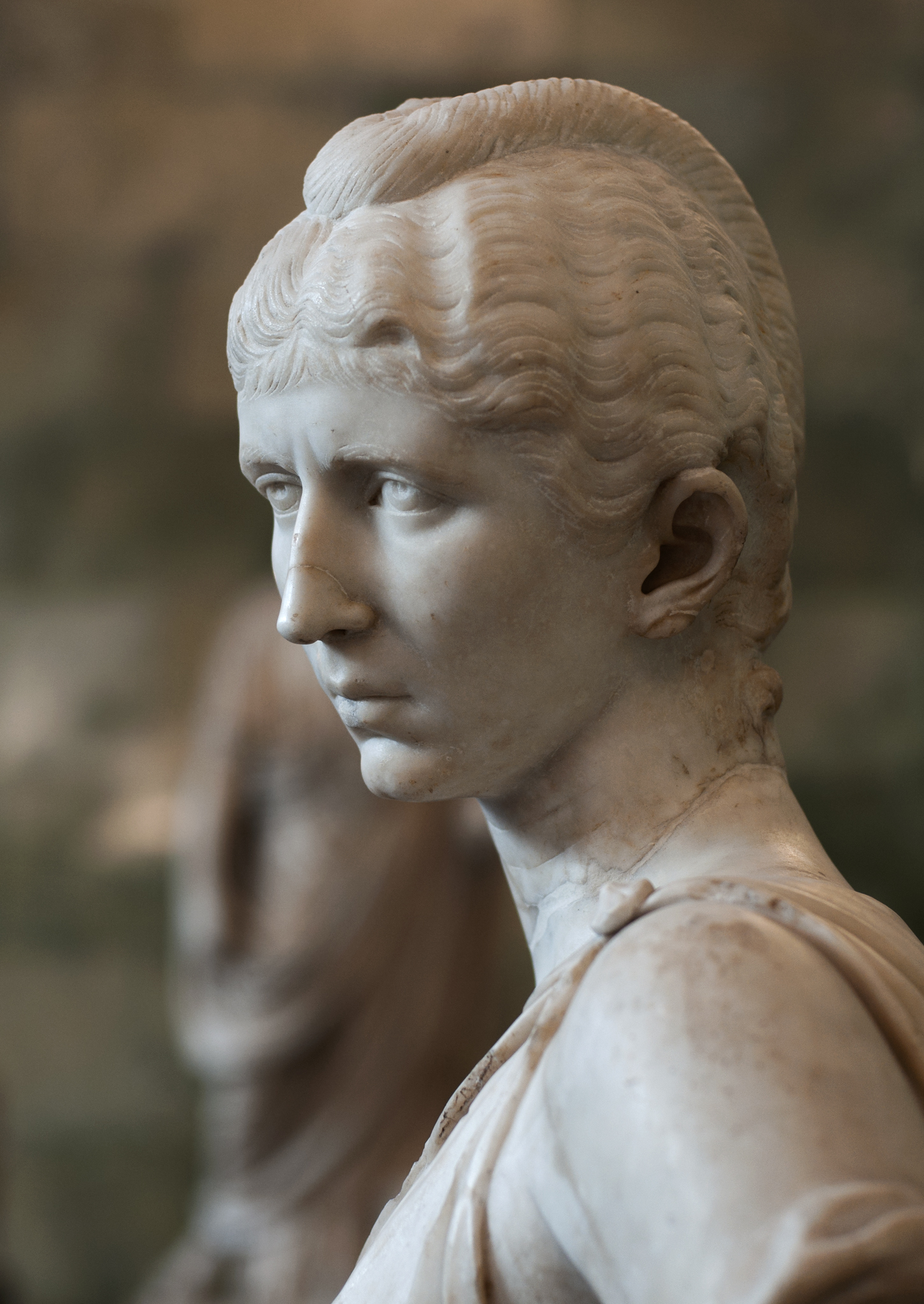
Bust of Cornelia Salonina

The exact birth date of Gallienus is unknown. The 6th-century Greek chronicler John Malalas and the Epitome de Caesaribus report that he was about 50 years old at the time of his death, meaning he was born around 218. He was the son of Emperor Valerian and Mariniana, who may have been of senatorial rank, possibly the daughter of Egnatius Victor Marinianus, and his half-brother was Valerianus Minor. Inscriptions on coins connect him with Falerii in Etruria, which may have been his birthplace; it has yielded many inscriptions relating to his mother's family, the Egnatii. Gallienus married Cornelia Salonina about ten years before his accession to the throne. She was the mother of three princes: Valerian II, who died in 258; Saloninus, who was named co-emperor but was murdered in 260 by the army of general Postumus; and Marinianus, who was killed in 268, shortly after his father was assassinated.

== Rule ==
When Valerian was proclaimed emperor in September 253, he asked the Senate to ratify the elevation of Gallienus to Augustus. He was also designated consul ordinarius for 254. As Marcus Aurelius and his adopted brother Lucius Verus had done a century earlier, Gallienus and his father divided the Empire. Valerian left for the East to stem the Persian threat, and Gallienus remained in Italy to repel the Germanic tribes on the Rhine and Danube. Division of the empire had become necessary due to its sheer size and the numerous threats it faced, and it facilitated negotiations with enemies who demanded to communicate directly with the emperor.

=== Early reign ===
Gallienus spent most of his time in the provinces of the Rhine area (Germania Inferior, Germania Superior, Raetia, and Noricum), though he almost certainly visited the Danube area and Illyricum in the years from 253 to 258. According to Eutropius and Aurelius Victor, he was particularly energetic and successful in preventing invaders from attacking the German provinces and Gaul, despite the weakness caused by Valerian's march on Italy against Aemilianus in 253. According to numismatic evidence, he seems to have won many victories there, and a victory in Roman Dacia might also be dated to that period. Even the hostile Latin tradition attributes success to him at this time.

In 255 or 257, Gallienus was made consul again, suggesting that he briefly visited Rome on those occasions, although no record survives. During his Danube sojourn (Drinkwater suggests in 255 or 256), he proclaimed his elder son Valerian II Caesar and thus official heir to himself and Valerian I; the boy probably joined Gallienus on campaign at that time, and when Gallienus moved west to the Rhine provinces in 257, he remained behind on the Danube as the personification of Imperial authority.

=== Revolts and usurpers ===
==== Ingenuus revolt ====
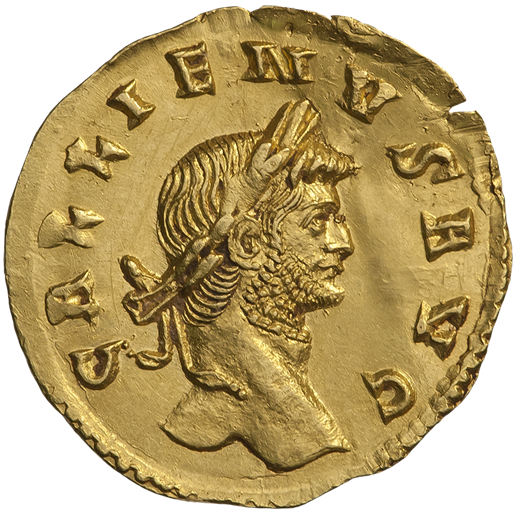
Aureus of Gallienus marked: GALLIENVS AVG.

Sometime between 258 and 260 (the exact date is unclear), while Valerian was distracted with the ongoing invasion of Shapur I in the East, and Gallienus was preoccupied with his problems in the West, Ingenuus, governor of at least one of the Pannonian provinces, took advantage and declared himself emperor. Valerian II had apparently died on the Danube, most likely in 258. Ingenuus may have been responsible for Valerian II's death. Alternatively, the defeat and capture of Valerian at the battle of Edessa may have been the trigger for the subsequent revolts of Ingenuus, Regalian, and Postumus. In any case, Gallienus reacted with great speed. He left his son Saloninus as Caesar at Cologne, under the supervision of Albanus (or Silvanus) and the military leadership of Postumus. He then hastily crossed the Balkans, taking with him the new cavalry corps (comitatus) under the command of Aureolus and defeated Ingenuus at Mursa or Sirmium. Ingenuus was killed by his own guards or committed suicide by drowning himself after the fall of his capital, Sirmium.

==== Alemanni invasion ====
A major invasion by the Alemanni and other Germanic tribes occurred between 258 and 260 (it is hard to fix the precise date of these events), probably due to the vacuum left by the withdrawal of troops supporting Gallienus in the campaign against Ingenuus. Franks broke through the lower Rhine, invading Gaul, some reaching as far as southern Spain, sacking Tarraco (modern Tarragona). The Alemanni invaded, probably through Agri Decumates (an area between the upper Rhine and the upper Danube), likely followed by the Juthungi. After devastating Germania Superior and Raetia (parts of southern France and Switzerland), they entered Italy, the first invasion of the Italian peninsula, aside from its most remote northern regions, since Hannibal 500 years before. When invaders reached the outskirts of Rome, they were repelled by an improvised army assembled by the Senate, consisting of local troops (probably praetorian guards) and the strongest of the civilian population. On their retreat through northern Italy, they were intercepted and defeated in the battle of Mediolanum (near present-day Milan) by Gallienus's army, which had advanced from Gaul, or from the Balkans after dealing with the Franks. The battle of Mediolanum was decisive, and the Alemanni did not bother the empire for the next ten years. The Juthungi managed to cross the Alps with their valuables and captives from Italy. A historian in the 19th century suggested that the initiative of the Senate gave rise to jealousy and suspicion by Gallienus, thus contributing to his exclusion of senators from military commands.

==== Regalian's revolt ====
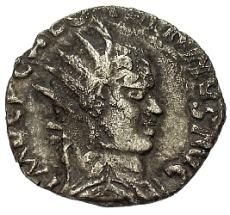
Antoninianus of Regalian: IMP. C. P. C. REGALIANVS P. F. AVG.

Around the same time, Regalian, who held some command in the Balkans, was proclaimed emperor. The reasons for this are unclear, and the Historia Augusta (almost the sole resource for these events) does not provide a credible story. It is possible the seizure can be attributed to the discontent of the civilian and military provincials, who felt the defense of the province was being neglected.

Regalian held power for some six months and issued coins bearing his image. After some success against the Sarmatians, his revolt ended when the Roxolani invaded Pannonia and killed Regalian in taking the city of Sirmium. There is a suggestion that Gallienus invited the Roxolani to attack Regalian, but other historians dismiss the accusation. It is also suggested that the invasion was finally checked by Gallienus near Verona and that he directed the restoration of the province, probably in person.

==== Capture of Valerian ====
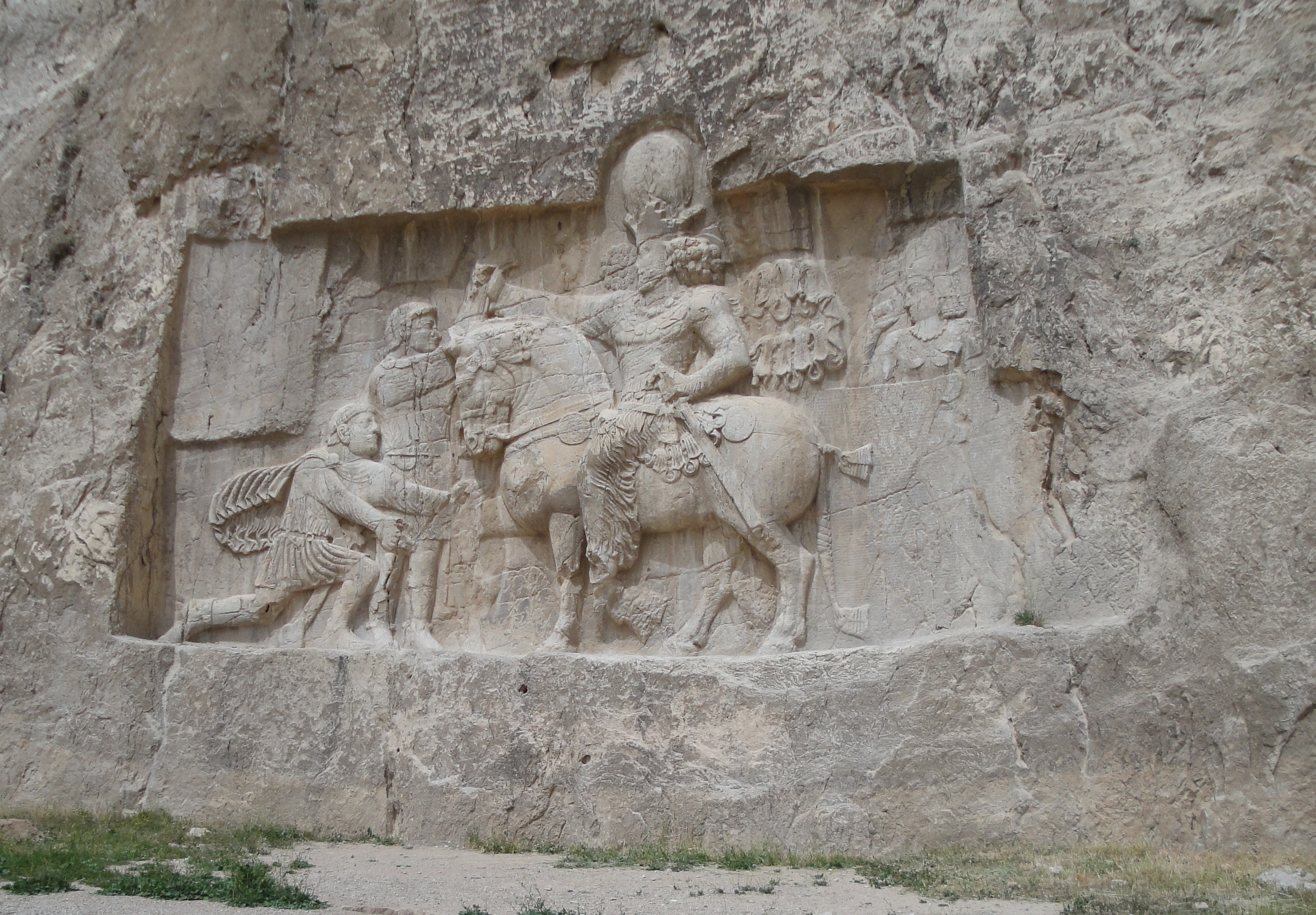
A bas relief of Emperor Valerian standing at the background and held captive by Shapur I was found at Naqsh-e Rustam, Shiraz, Iran. The kneeling man is probably Philip the Arab.

In the East, Valerian was confronted with serious troubles. Bands of "Scythai" began a naval raid of Pontus, in the northern part of Asia Minor. After ravaging the province, they moved south into Cappadocia. A Roman army from Antioch, under Valerian, tried to intercept them but failed. According to Zosimus, this army was infected by a plague that gravely weakened it. In that condition, this army had to repel a new invasion of the province of Mesopotamia by Shapur I, ruler of the Sassanid Empire. The invasion occurred probably in the early spring of 260. The Roman army was defeated at the Battle of Edessa, and Valerian was taken prisoner. Shapur's army raided Cilicia and Cappadocia (in present-day Turkey), sacking, as Shapur's inscriptions claim, 36 cities.

==== Macrianus revolt ====
It took a rally by an officer named Callistus (Balista), a fiscal official named Fulvius Macrianus, the remnants of the Roman army in the east, and Odenathus and his Palmyrene horsemen to turn the tide against Shapur. The Sassanids were driven back, but Macrianus proclaimed his two sons Quietus and Macrianus (sometimes misspelled Macrinus) as emperors. Coins struck for them in major cities of the East indicate acknowledgement of the usurpation. The two Macriani left Quietus, Ballista, and, presumably, Odenathus to deal with the Persians while they invaded Europe with an army of 30,000 men, according to the Historia Augusta. At first they met no opposition.

The Pannonian legions joined the invaders, being resentful of the absence of Gallienus. He sent his successful commander Aureolus against the rebels, however, and the decisive battle was fought in the spring or early summer of 261, most likely in Illyricum, although Zonaras locates it in Pannonia. In any case, the army of the usurpers was defeated and surrendered, and their two leaders were killed.

In the aftermath of the battle, the rebellion of Postumus had already started, so Gallienus had no time to deal with the rest of the usurpers, namely Balista and Quietus. He came to an agreement with Odenathus, who had just returned from his victorious Persian expedition. Odenathus received the title of dux Romanorum and besieged the usurpers, who were based at Emesa. Eventually, the people of Emesa killed Quietus, and Odenathus arrested and executed Balista about November 261.

==== Postumus revolt ====
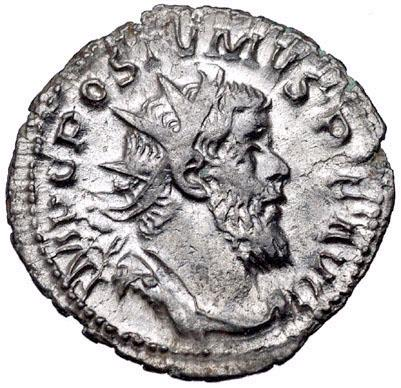
Antoninianus of Postumus. Legend:IMP. C. POSTVMVS P. F. AVG.

After the defeat at Edessa, Gallienus lost control over the provinces of Britain, Spain, Germania, and a large part of Gaul when another general, Postumus, declared his own realm, known today as the Gallic Empire. The revolt partially coincided with that of Macrianus in the East. Gallienus had installed his son Saloninus and his guardian, Silvanus, in Cologne in 258. Postumus, a general in command of troops on the banks of the Rhine, defeated some raiders and took possession of their spoils. Instead of returning it to the original owners, he distributed it amongst his soldiers. When news of this reached Silvanus, he demanded the spoils be sent to him. Postumus made a show of submission, but his soldiers mutinied and proclaimed him emperor. Under his command, they besieged Cologne, and after some weeks the defenders of the city opened the gates and handed Saloninus and Silvanus to Postumus, who had them killed. The date of these events was long uncertain but an inscription discovered in 1992 at Augsburg indicates that Postumus had been proclaimed emperor by September 260. Postumus claimed the consulship for himself and one of his associates, Honoratianus, but according to D.S. Potter, he never tried to unseat Gallienus or invade Italy. Upon receiving news of the murder of his son, Gallienus began gathering forces to face Postumus. The invasion of the Macriani forced him to dispatch Aureolus with a big force to oppose them leaving him with insufficient troops to battle Postumus. After some initial defeats, the army of Aureolus, having defeated the Macriani joined him, and Postumus was expelled. Aureolus was entrusted with the pursuit, deliberately allowing Postumus to escape and gather new forces. Gallienus returned in 263 or 265 and surrounded Postumus in an unnamed Gallic city. During the siege Gallienus was severely wounded by an arrow and had to flee. The standstill persisted until his later death and the Gallic Empire remained independent until 274.

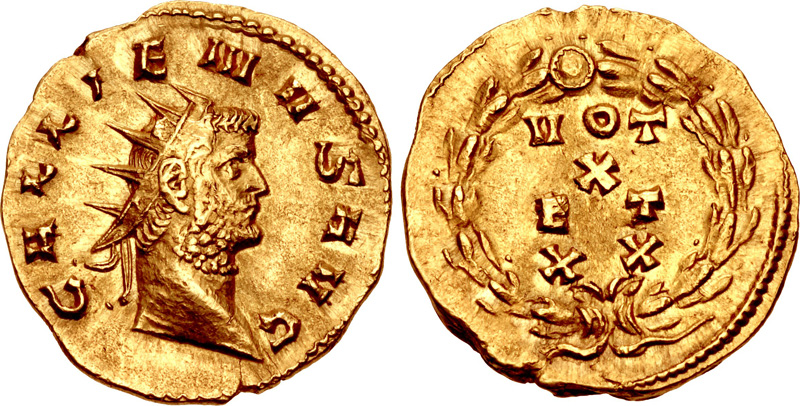
Aureus of Gallienus, minted in Mediolanum (Milan), dated 262

==== Aemilianus revolt ====
In 262 the mint in Alexandria started to again issue coins for Gallienus, demonstrating that Egypt had returned to his control after suppressing the revolt of the Macriani. In spring of 262, the city was wrenched by civil unrest as a result of a new revolt. The rebel this time was the prefect of Egypt, Lucius Mussius Aemilianus, who had already supported the revolt of the Macriani. The correspondence of Pope Dionysius of Alexandria provides a commentary on the background of invasion, civil war, plague, and famine that characterized this age.

Knowing he could not afford to lose control of the vital Egyptian granaries, Gallienus sent his general Theodotus against Aemilianus, probably by a naval expedition. The decisive battle took place near Thebes, and the result was a clear defeat of Aemilianus. In the aftermath, Gallienus became Consul three more times in 262, 264, and 266.

==== Herulian invasions ====
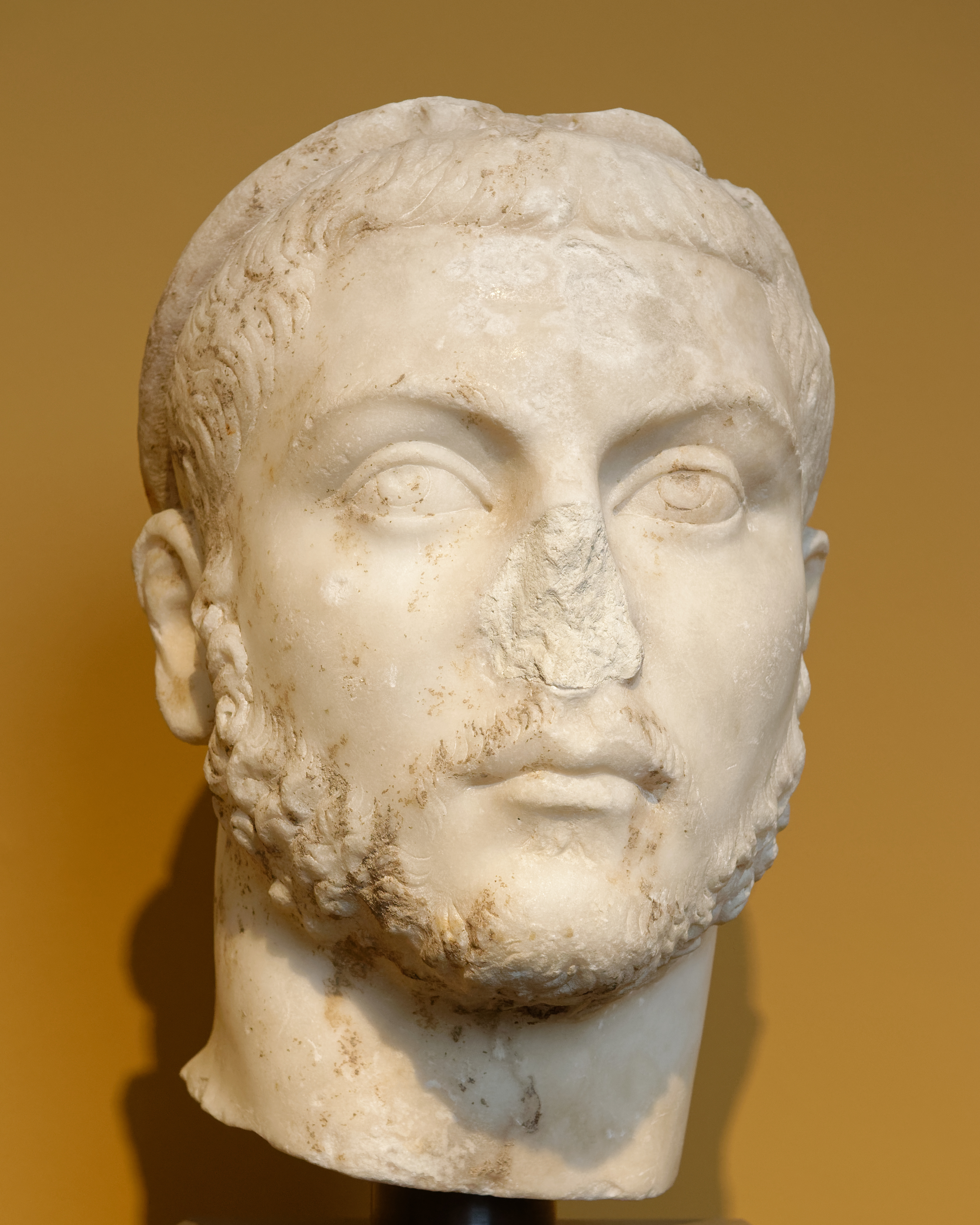
Bust of Gallienus, Ny Carlsberg Glyptotek.

In the years 267–269, Goths and other barbarians invaded the empire in great numbers. Sources are extremely confused on the dating of these invasions, the participants, and their targets. Modern historians are not even able to discern with certainty whether there were two or more of these invasions or a single prolonged one. It seems that, at first, a major naval expedition was led by the Heruli starting from north of the Black Sea and leading to the ravaging of many cities of Greece (among them, Athens and Sparta). Then another, even more numerous army of invaders started a second naval invasion of the empire. The Romans defeated the barbarians on sea first. Gallienus's army then won a battle in Thrace, and the emperor pursued the invaders. According to some historians, he was the leader of the army who won the great Battle of Naissus, while the majority believes that the victory must be attributed to his successor, Claudius II.

==== Aureolus revolt ====
In 268, at some time before or soon after the battle of Naissus, the authority of Gallienus was challenged by Aureolus, commander of the cavalry stationed in Mediolanum (Milan), who was supposed to keep an eye on Postumus. Instead, he acted as deputy to Postumus until the very last days of his revolt, when he seems to have claimed the throne for himself. The decisive battle took place at what is now Pontirolo Nuovo near Milan; Aureolus was clearly defeated and driven back to Milan. Gallienus laid siege to the city but was murdered during the siege. There are differing accounts of the murder, but the sources agree that most of Gallienus's officials wanted him dead. According to the Historia Augusta, an unreliable source compiled long after the events it describes, a conspiracy was led by the commander of the guard Aurelius Heraclianus and Lucius Aurelius Marcianus. Marcianus's role in the conspiracy is not confirmed by any other ancient source.

== Assassination ==
Cecropius, commander of the Dalmatians, spread the word that the forces of Aureolus were leaving the city, and Gallienus left his tent without his bodyguard, only to be struck down by Cecropius. One version has Claudius selected as emperor by the conspirators, another chosen by Gallienus on his death bed; the Historia Augusta was concerned to substantiate the descent of the Constantinian dynasty from Claudius, and this may explain its accounts, which do not involve Claudius in the murder. The other sources (Zosimus i.40 and Zonaras xii.25) report that the conspiracy was organized by Heraclianus, Claudius, and Aurelian.

According to Aurelius Victor and Zonaras, on hearing the news that Gallienus was dead, the Senate in Rome ordered the execution of his family (including his brother Valerianus and son Marinianus) and their supporters, just before receiving a message from Claudius to spare their lives and deify his predecessor. The tomb of Gallienus is thought to be located to the south of Rome, at the IXth mile of the Via Appia.

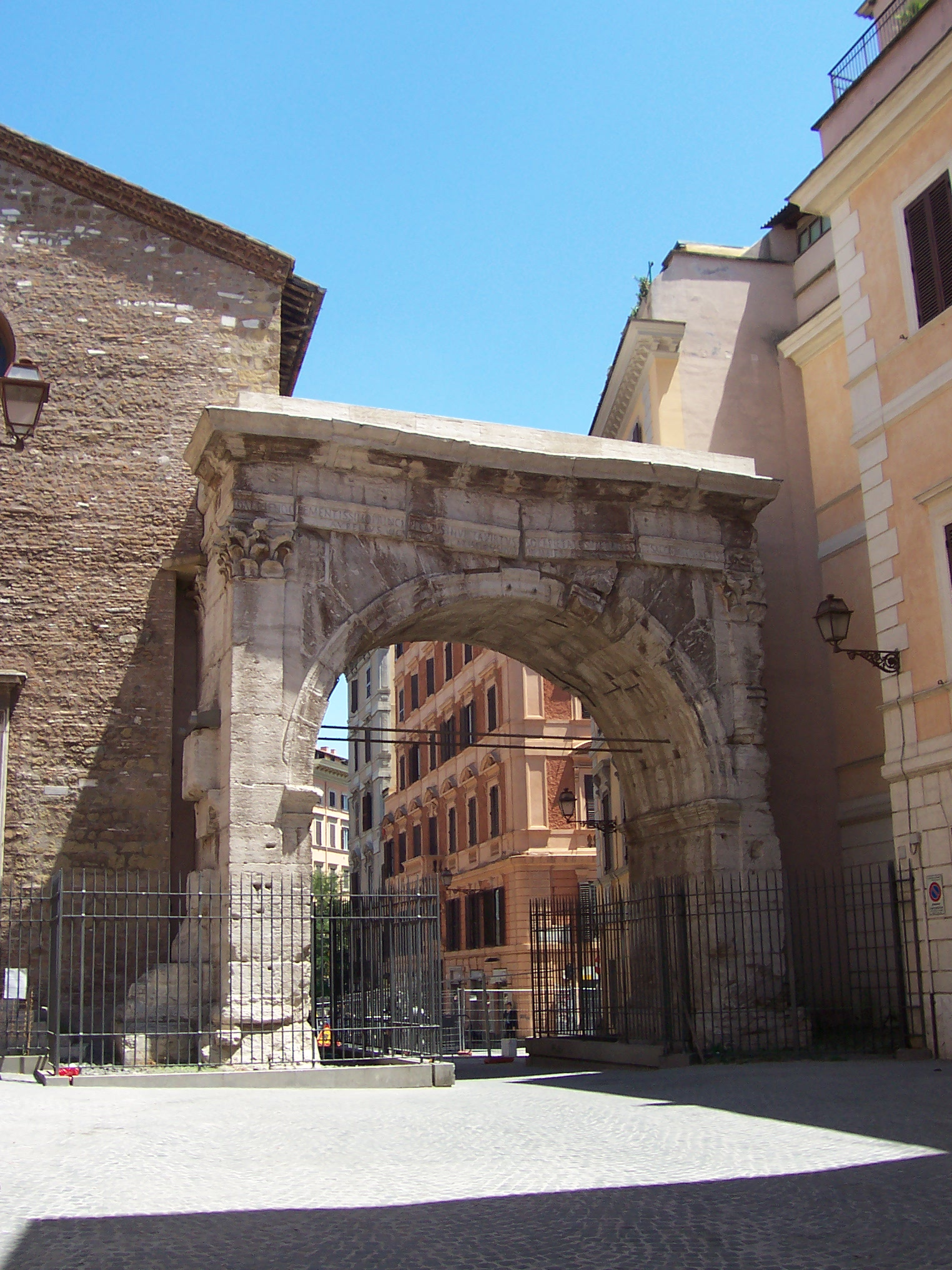
Arch of Gallienus in Rome dedicated to, rather than built by, Gallienus.

== Legacy ==
=== Historiography ===
Gallienus was not treated favorably by ancient historians. The biased and largely fictional account of that reign in the Historia Augusta describes him as a lover of luxury, who dressed in purple, sprinkled gold dust in his hair, and built castles of apples. Emperor Julian's The Caesars presents Gallienus "with the dress and languishing gait of a woman", which is possibly connected with coins portraying the emperor with unusual iconography and bearing the legend Gallienae Augustae. This animosity within the sources was partly due to the secession of Gaul and Palmyra and his inability to win them back. At the time of Gallienus's death, Palmyra was still nominally loyal to Rome, but under the leadership of Odaenathus was independent in nearly every other respect. Palmyra would formally secede after Odaenathus's death and the ascension of his widow Zenobia. It was not until the reign of Aurelian several years later that the breakaway provinces were truly brought back into the Roman fold. According to modern scholar Pat Southern, some historians now see Gallienus in a more positive light. Gallienus produced some useful reforms.

=== Coins ===
About 40 rare gold coins of Gallienus have been discovered as part of the Lava Treasure in Corsica, France, in the 1980s.

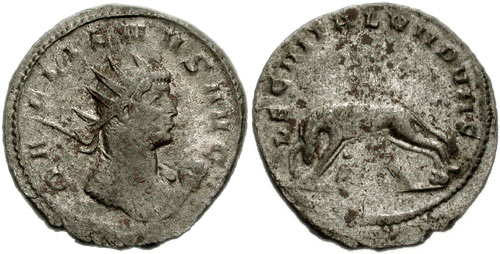
Antoninianus issued to celebrate LEG II ITAL VII P VII F, "Legio II Italica seven times faithful and loyal."

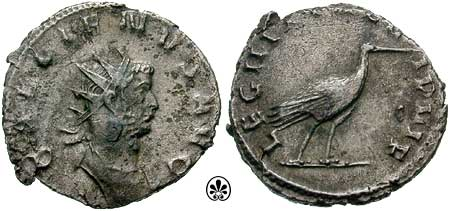
Antoninianus issued to celebrate LEG III ITAL VI P VI F, "Legio III Italica six times faithful and loyal."

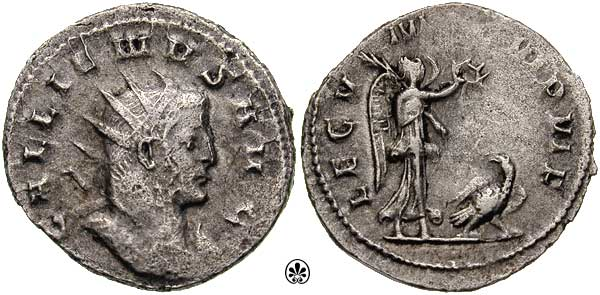
Antoninianus issued to celebrate LEG VII MAC VI P VI F, "Legio VII Macedonica six times faithful and loyal."

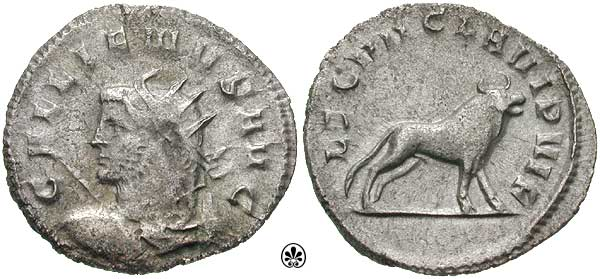
Antoninianus issued to celebrate LEG VII CLA VI P VI F, "Legio VII Claudia six times faithful and loyal."

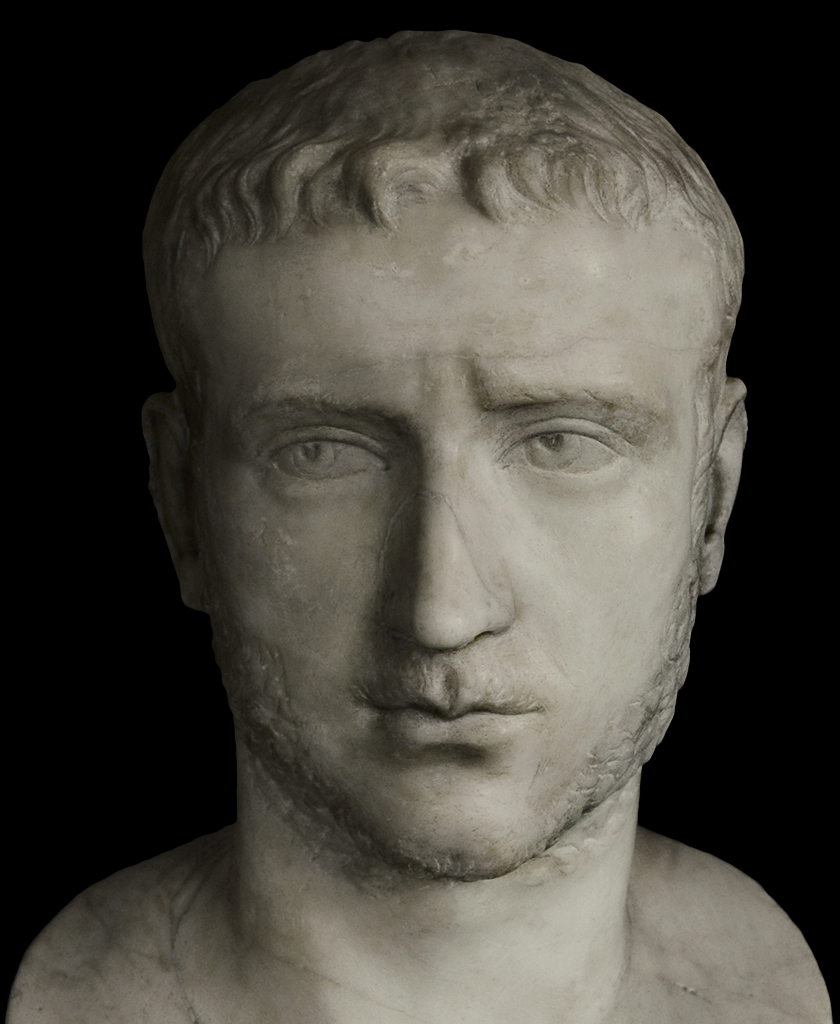
Bust of Gallienus in the Capitoline Museums, Rome

=== Military reforms ===
He contributed to military history as the first to commission primarily cavalry units, the Comitatenses, that could be dispatched anywhere in the Empire in short order. This reform arguably created a precedent for the future emperors Diocletian and Constantine I, while creating the tools for Aurelian's successes. The biographer Aurelius Victor reports that Gallienus forbade senators from becoming military commanders. This policy undermined senatorial power, as more reliable equestrian commanders rose to prominence. In Southern's view, these reforms and the decline in senatorial influence not only helped Aurelian to salvage the Empire, but they also make Gallienus one of the emperors most responsible for the creation of the Dominate, along with Septimius Severus, Diocletian, and Constantine I.

=== Decree of Toleration ===
The capture of Valerian in the year 259 forced Gallienus to issue the first official declaration of tolerance with regard to the Christians, restoring their places of worship and cemeteries, therefore implying a recognition of the property of the Church. However, the edict did not turn Christianity into an official religion.

=== In popular culture ===
==== Films ====
Gallienus was played by Franco Cobianchi in the 1964 film The Magnificent Gladiator.

==== Novels ====
- He appears in Harry Sidebottom's historical fiction novel series Warrior of Rome.
- David Drake's novel Birds of Prey takes place during Gallienus's reign.

== Family tree ==
Aulus Egnatius Priscillianus philosopher
Quintus Egnatius Proculus consul suffectus	Lucius Egnatius Victor
Egnatius Victor Marinianus consul suffectus	1.Mariniana	Valerian; Roman Emperor; 253–260	2.Cornelia Gallonia
previous Aemilianus; Roman Emperor; 253	(1) Gallienus; Roman Emperor; 253–268 ∞ Cornelia Salonina	(2) Valerianus Minor consul suffectus	Claudius Gothicus; Roman Emperor; 268–270	Quintillus; Roman Emperor; 270	next Aurelian; Roman Emperor; 270–275 ∞ Ulpia Severina
Valerian II caesar	Saloninus co-emperor	Marinianus consul 268

== See also ==
- Little Peace of the Church
- Thirty Tyrants (Roman)

== Citations ==
Regnal titles
Preceded by Valerian	Roman emperor 253–268; With: Valerian (253–260) and Saloninus (260)	Succeeded by Claudius Gothicus
Political offices
Preceded by Volusianus; Lucius Valerius Poplicola	Roman consul 254–255 with Valerian	Succeeded by Lucius Valerius Maximus; M. Acilius Glabrio
Preceded by Lucius Valerius Maximus; M. Acilius Glabrio	Roman consul 257 with Valerian	Succeeded by Marcus Nummius Tuscus; Mummius Bassus
Preceded by Publius Cornelius Saecularis; Gaius Iunius Donatus	Roman consul 261–262 with Lucius Petronius Taurus Volusianus; Nummius Faustianus	Succeeded by Marcus Nummius Albinus; Dexter
Preceded by Marcus Nummius Albinus; Dexter	Roman consul 264 with Saturninus	Succeeded by Publius Licinius Valerianus, Lucillus
Preceded by Publius Licinius Valerianus, Lucillus	Roman consul 266 with Sabinillus	Succeeded by Ovinius Paternus; Arcesilaus
