= Alkimos =

Alkimos may refer to:

- Alcimus (mythology), characters from Greek Mythology
- Alkimos, Western Australia, a suburb of Perth, Western Australia
- Alkimos (ship), a merchant ship wrecked on the coast north of Perth, Western Australia
- 12714 Alkimos, an asteroid

== See also ==
- Alcimus (disambiguation)
