= Ulpia Severina =

Roman empress from 270 to 275

- Augusta
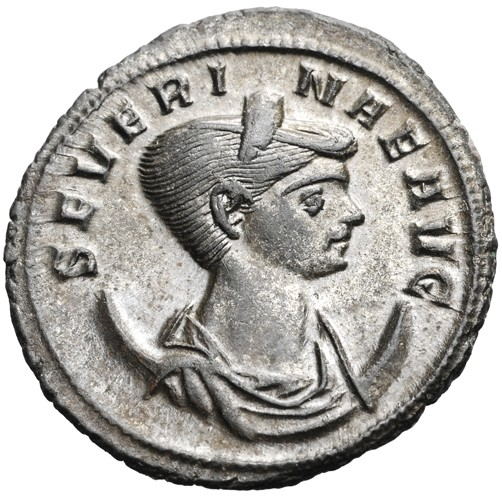
- Antoninianus of Severina

Roman empress
- Tenure: c. 270 – September/October 275
- Born: 3rd century Dacia?
- Died: After 275
- Spouse: Aurelian
- Issue: A daughter
- Father: Ulpius Crinitus (?), possibly legendary

Ulpia Severina was Roman empress as the wife of Roman emperor Aurelian from c. 270 to 275. Severina is unmentioned in surviving literary sources and known only from coinage and inscriptions, and as a result, very little is known about her. Her nomen Ulpia suggests that she may have been related either to Emperor Trajan (r. 98–117) or the usurper Laelianus (r. 269), as they share the same nomen, and perhaps from Dacia, where the name was common. It is not known when she married Aurelian, but it might have been before he became emperor. She was probably proclaimed Augusta in the autumn of 274.

Aurelian was murdered in September/October 275 and his successor, Tacitus, was proclaimed emperor only after a brief interregnum, lasting somewhere between five and eleven weeks. Though coins of Severina were minted under Aurelian from 274 to 275, some historians speculatively assign certain unusual types of coins to this brief interregnum period and suggest that Severina either effectively briefly ruled the empire in her own right, or that there was confusion in regards to Aurelian's successor until Tacitus became emperor, and coin mints thus chose to mint coins in Severina's name. Given that no literary source discusses Severina, any interpretation of the unusual coins remains speculation.

== Early life and family ==
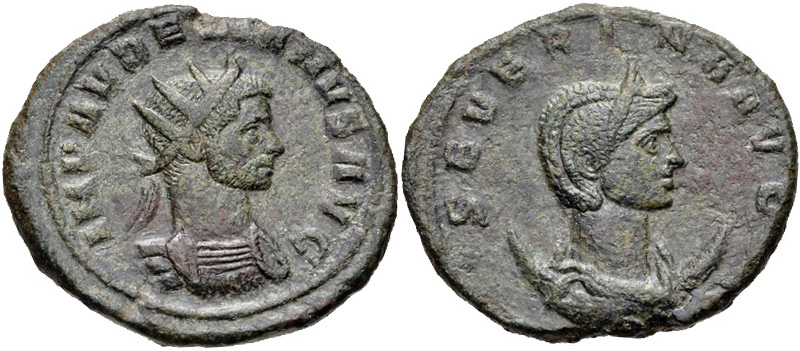
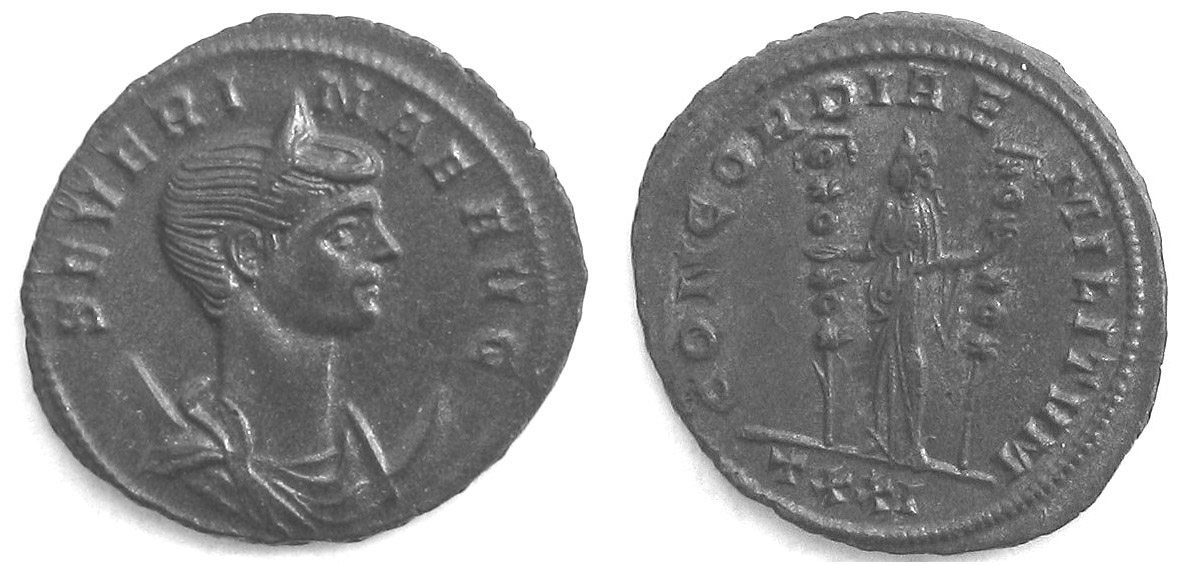
Dupondius depicting Aurelian and Severina (top) and antoninianus depicting only Severina (bottom)

Very little is known of Ulpia Severina given that no surviving literary source discusses her at all. The only allusions to her whatsoever in surviving texts are a handful of references to "Aurelian's wife" in the Historia Augusta and the 12th-century Epitome of Histories by Joannes Zonaras stating that Aurelian married a daughter of Zenobia, probably an invented story. Her year of birth is not known. Through conjecture, it is possible to assume that Severina came either from Dacia or one of the other Danubian provinces, as the nomen Ulpia had been common there ever since the conquests of Emperor Trajan (Marcus Ulpius Trajanus). It has historically been assumed that Severina was the daughter of a man by the name Ulpius Crinitus, a figure that appears in the Historia Augusta as a paragon of military and senatorial virtue, a descendant of Trajan and the adoptive father of Aurelian. However, Ulpius Crinitus's existence is perhaps an invention of the Historia Augusta, given that contemporary evidence gleaned from inscriptions and coins does not mention him. Severina may have been related to the usurper Laelianus (Ulpius Cornelius Laelianus).

It is not known when she married Aurelian, possibly it was before he became emperor, and nothing is known of her role as empress and her political influence. The only reliable evidence in regards to Severina at all is a scant number of inscriptions and coins, which confirms that she was Aurelian's wife and that she held the title of Augusta. Only two known coins omit the title Augusta, instead styling her as Pia. These were probably minted before she was made Augusta. In full, inscription from Pula names her as domina Ulpia Severina Augusta, mater castrorum et senatus et patriae ("lady Ulpia Severina Augusta, mother of the camp, the senate and the fatherland"). One inscription also styles her as Piissima Augusta (pious Augusta). · Severina also appears to have been deified, as some coins style her as diva. No coins styling Severina as Augusta can be dated before 274 and it is possible that she was not made Augusta until the autumn of that year, perhaps around 29 August, coinciding with Aurelian's triumph celebrating the defeats and reincorporations of the Palmyrene and Gallic empires.

After the autumn of 274, coins commemorating Severina were issued together with those commemorating Aurelian; some coins included the profiles of both. On the coins, Severina is depicted in a typical way for her time, with braided hair drawn up over the back of her head and an austere expression. Typically, her coins include the goddess Concordia, though some instead feature the goddesses Venus and Juno, the standard deities for empresses. Severina survived beyond Aurelian's murder in 275 and the date of her death is unknown. Aurelian and Severina had a daughter together, though her name is unknown.

== Dowager empress ==
=== Interregnum ===
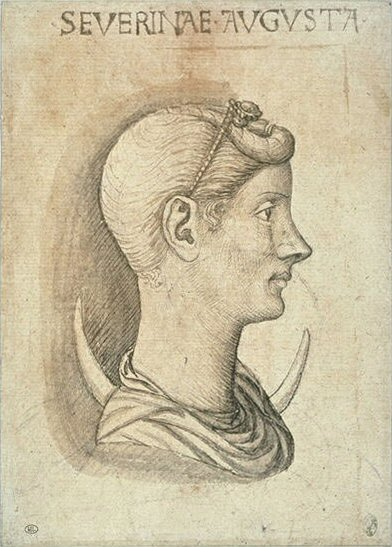
15th-century portrait of Severina by Pisanello, based on her coins

Aurelian died in September or October 275, murdered by his own officers after his secretary, afraid of being punished for a small lie, convinced them that the emperor intended to put them to death. Aurelian's successor, Tacitus, was proclaimed emperor in November or December. Historically, many scholars, including Edward Gibbon, assumed that the "interregnum" between Aurelian and Tacitus was significantly longer given that both the Historia Augusta and the 4th-century writings of Aurelius Victor state that the interval between Aurelian's death and Tacitus's rise to power lasted six months. According to their accounts, this period consisted of the army in Thrace, worried as they were complicit in Aurelian's murder, and the Roman Senate repeatedly petitioning each other to elect a successor.

This account is overwhelmingly dismissed today as not being credible as the dates given by the Historia Augusta and Victor only fit if Aurelian died early in 275 and Tacitus became emperor in September, which does not fit the surviving evidence. Contemporary documentation from Egypt suggests that the interval was at the most only 10 or 11 weeks, and perhaps as short as just 5 weeks. If accounting for the time it took for the news of Aurelian's death to reach Italy, and the information to spread out into the empire from there, the interval of the supposed interregnum is very brief. The Epitome of Histories by the 12th-century historian Joannes Zonaras mentions an "interregnum" between Aurelian and Tacitus, but he likely used the 4th-century Enmannsche Kaisergeschichte as a source, wherein the term "interregnum" more probably referred to the time between Aurelian and Probus, regarding the briefly reigning emperors Tacitus and Florianus as sorts of "inter-regents". Other ancient historians, such as Eusebius, are known to sometimes have regarded Tacitus and Florianus as too insignificant to count. Despite the dismissal of a lengthy interregnum as fantasy, and the lack of unequivocal evidence for any extended interregnum at all, many historians still believe that there was a brief interregnum of some sort, often citing spurious numismatic (coin-based) evidence. Some coinage once thought to have been minted in the period between Aurelian and Tacitus, bearing the legend GENIVS P.R. and sometimes the letters SC (interpreted as indicating the Roman Senate assuming control of the government between the reigns of the two emperors), have recently been re-assigned to the earlier reign of Gallienus.

=== Severina's status ===
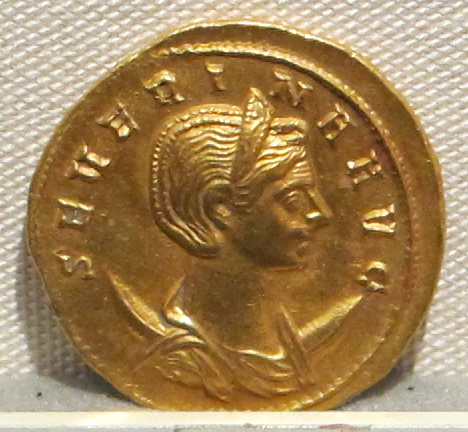
Aureus depicting Severina

Some scholars supporting the notion of an interregnum between Aurelian and Tacitus have turned to speculating based only on numismatic evidence that the Roman Empire was governed, at least nominally, by Severina until Tacitus became emperor. Though many numismatists view Severina's tenure as de facto ruler of the empire as beyond dispute, others consider it as only speculation and doubt the interpretation given that it is only based in the interpretation of certain coins and that literary sources are entirely silent on the matter. Based on the increasing quantity of her coinage towards the end of Aurelian's reign, it has been argued that some coins were minted of Severina also after Aurelian's death, though Alaric Watson, author of a biography on Aurelian, dismissed this argument since he found it based more in a desire to find coins supposedly dating to the interregnum rather than the actual features of the coinage. According to the numismatist David L. Vagi, Severina ruling the empire for an extended interregnum "does not appear to be based in historical fact", though her coins may have been issued at a few mints in the weeks between Aurelian's death and Tacitus's accession.

The coins most widely suggested to have been minted under Severina's supposed tenure as ruler of the empire bear the legend CONCORDIAE MILITVM and depict the goddess Concordia holding two legionary standards, interpreted as Severina perhaps working to retain the loyalty of the soldiers. No similar coins were issued with the name of Aurelian, taken by some to mean that they were minted after his death. Coins of this type minted at Antioch are even more unusual in that they style Severina as Pia Felix Augusta, a feminine version of the normal title of the emperors (Pius Felix Augustus). A handful of coins also bear the legend CONCORDIA AVG. That it is the singular AVG (Augusta/Augustus) used rather than the plural AVGG (Augusti) is a striking detail that may perhaps hint at them being minted at a time when Severina was the sole ruler. Though they are highly unusual, a problem with attributing these coins to after Aurelian's death is that most agree that such issues were minted in Antioch, Rome and Ticinum, but not in the Balkans and other eastern cities (which had never minted any coins in Severina's name but would have been the first places to hear of Aurelian's death). It is possible that some of the coins of Severina were minted after Aurelian's death, but that in of itself does not necessarily mean that she ruled in her own right since it is also possible that the time it took to name Aurelian's successor led to a period of confusion, and that some coin mints thus simply continued to mint coins recognizing Severina.

Ulpia Severina
Royal titles
Preceded by Cornelia Salonina	Roman empress 270–275	Vacant Interregnum (275-283) Next known title holder: Magnia Urbica
