= Marcus Nummius Tuscus =

Roman senator and consul in 258

Marcus Nummius Tuscus (fl. 3rd century AD) was a Roman senator who was appointed consul in AD 258.

== Biography ==
Nummius Tuscus was the son of Marcus Nummius Senecio Albinus who had been consul in AD 227. He in turn was appointed consul prior in AD 258, alongside Mummius Bassus. No further details of his career have survived.

Nummius Tuscus was perhaps the brother of Marcus Nummius Albinus who was consul ordinarius in AD 263, and he may have been the father of Marcus Nummius Tuscus, who was consul in AD 295. According to the notoriously unreliable Historia Augusta, on one occasion he accompanied the emperor Valerian to the city of Byzantium where they visited some public baths.

== Sources ==
- Mennen, Inge, Power and Status in the Roman Empire, AD 193-284 (2011)

Political offices
Preceded by Publius Licinius Valerianus IV, and Publius Licinius Gallienus III	Consul of the Roman Empire; 258 with Mummius Bassus	Succeeded by Aemilianus, and Pomponius Bassus
