= Marcus Nummius Senecio Albinus =

Roman senator and consul in 227

Marcus Nummius Senecio Albinus (fl. 3rd century AD) was a Roman senator who was appointed consul in AD 227 with Marcus Laelius Fulvius Maximus Aemilianus. Nothing else of his career has been preserved.

== Biography ==
Senecio Albinus was the son of Marcus Nummius Umbrius Primus Senecio Albinus who had been consul in AD 206, and the step-brother of Lucius Roscius Aelianus Paculus Salvius Iulianus, the consul of AD 223. He was the father of Marcus Nummius Tuscus, consul of AD 258, and may also have been the father of Marcus Nummius Albinus, who was consul ordinarius in AD 263.

== Sources ==
- Mennen, Inge, Power and Status in the Roman Empire, AD 193-284 (2011)

Political offices
Preceded by Marcus Aurelius Severus Alexander II; Gaius Aufidius Marcellus II	Consul of the Roman Empire; 227 with Marcus Laelius Fulvius Maximus Aemilianus	Succeeded by Quintus Aiacius Modestus Crescentianus II; Marcus Pomponius Maecius Probus
