= Alcimus Alethius =

4th-century Latin poet

Alcimus (Avitus) Alethius was the writer of seven short poems in the Latin Anthology. Classical scholar J. C. Wernsdorf believed him to be the same person as Alcimus, the rhetorician in Aquitania, in Gaul, who is spoken of in terms of high praise by Sidonius Apollinaris and Ausonius. It is possible however that Apollinaris was referring to his contemporary, Avitus of Vienne, also known as Alcimus Ecdicius Avitus.

The date of this Alcimus is determined by Jerome in his Chronicon, who says that Alcimus and Delphidius taught in Aquitania in 360 AD.
