= Harry Sidebottom =

British author and historian

- Born: Newmarket, Suffolk, England
- Occupations: Author, historian
- Writing career
- Genres: History, fiction, non-fiction
- Notable work: Warrior of Rome
- Website: harrysidebottom.co.uk

Harry Sidebottom is a British author and historian, best known for his two series of historical novels the Warrior of Rome, and Throne of the Caesars. He is Lecturer in Ancient History at Lincoln College, Oxford, and was Fellow and Tutor in Ancient History at St. Benet's Hall, Oxford.

== Early life ==
Sidebottom was born in Cambridge and brought up in Newmarket, Suffolk, where his father worked as a racehorse trainer. He attended Fairstead House School, Newmarket, and King's Ely.

Sidebottom read Ancient History for his first degree, at Lancaster University (1977–1980). He was awarded an MPhil in 1982 from the University of Manchester and later a DPhil from the University of Oxford. He studied at Corpus Christi College, where he is a member of the senior common room. He has written for The Times, The Times Literary Supplement, Financial Times, The Daily Telegraph, The Literary Review, National Geographic, Los Angeles Review of Books, El País, and The Irish Times, and contributed to several scholarly journals, including Classical Quarterly, Journal of Roman Studies, Classical Review, L'Antiquite Classique, and Historia: Zeitschrift für Alte Geschichte. He has appeared as a presenter on the History Channel's Ancient Discoveries.

== Books ==
=== Warrior of Rome ===
From the beginning Sidebottom intended the Warrior of Rome to be a series structured in trilogies. The first three volumes take place in the Middle East and subsequent arcs are set around the Black Sea, the Baltic, Sicily, North Africa, and Italy. Sidebottom stated he drew inspiration for the series from historical writer Tacitus and commented that he had based several of the series' elements on real people and events from history. The series has sold well, with Fire in the East selling over 100,000 copies and spending five weeks in the UK top 10 upon its release. Worldwide the series has sold over half a million copies.

The Last Hour is a thriller set in the City of Rome. It was shortlisted for the Historical Writers Association Gold Crown for the outstanding historical novel of 2018.

The Burning Road, a new novel featuring Ballista, was published on 30 September 2021. The series centres on the Anglo-Roman soldier Marcus Clodius Ballista (a fictionalized version of Balista, a.k.a. Callistus, one of the Thirty Tyrants) as he must live through and survive the machinations of the Roman Empire and several of the crises of the second half of the third century AD.

=== Throne of the Caesars ===
Sidebottom has written another series set in ancient Rome and its empire called Throne of the Caesars. The new trilogy is set 30 years before the first Warrior of Rome book in the reigns of Severus Alexander and Maximinus Thrax (AD 235–38) beginning with the assassination of Alexander and ending with the deaths of Pupienus and Balbinus.

== Bibliography ==
=== Fiction ===
==== Warrior of Rome ====
1. Fire in the East (Michael Joseph, 2008)
2. King of Kings (Penguin, 2009)
3. Lion of the Sun (Penguin, 2010)
4. The Caspian Gates (Penguin, 2011)
5. The Wolves of the North (Penguin, 2012)
6. The Amber Road (Penguin/Michael Joseph, 2013)
7. The Last Hour (Bonnier Zaffre, 2018) Shortlisted for The Historical Writers` Association Gold Crown for the outstanding historical novel of the year https://historicalwriters.org/hwa-crowns-2018-the-shortlists/
8. The Burning Road (Bonnier Zaffre, 2021) A Book of the Year in The Times
9. Falling Sky (Zaffre, 2022)

==== Throne of the Caesars ====
1. Iron & Rust (HarperCollins, 2014)
2. Blood & Steel (HarperCollins, 2015)
3. Fire & Sword (HarperCollins, 2016)

==== Stand-alone novels ====
The Lost Ten (Bonnier Zaffre, 2019)
The Return (Bonnier Zaffre, 2020)
The Shadow King (Bonnier Zaffre, 2023)

=== Non-fiction ===
- Ancient Warfare: A Very Short Introduction, Oxford University Press (2004)
- International Relations, The Cambridge Companion of Greek and Roman Warfare (2007)
- Blackwell Encyclopedia of Ancient Battles (ed. with Michael Whitby) (2017)
- The Mad Emperor: Heliogabalus and the Decadence of Rome, Oneworld (2022) A Book of the Year in The Spectator, BBC History Extra, and The Financial Times; shortlisted for The Slightly Foxed Best First Biography 2022 Prize, and chosen by Yuval Noah Harari as a "Best Book of 2023"
- Those Who Are About To Die: Gladiators and the Roman Mind, Hutchinson Heinemann (2025), published in paperback as A Day in the Life of a Gladiator: An Alternative History of Ancient Rome, Penguin (2026), and in the USA as Those Who Are About To Die: A Day in the Life of a Gladiator, Knopf (2026) A Book of the Year in The Times, The Economist, and a Waterstones History Book of the Year 2025, and Longlisted for The Historical Writers' Association Non-fiction Crown Award
