= Lucius Egnatius Victor =

3rd century Roman senator and suffect consul

(Lucius) Egnatius Victor (fl. 3rd century) was a Roman military officer and senator who was appointed suffect consul for an uncertain nundinium prior to 207.

== Biography ==
Egnatius Victor was a member of the second and third century gens Egnatia, which most likely originated in Etruria, although Numidian and Bithynian origins have also been suggested. It has been conjectured that he was the son of Aulus Egnatius Priscillianus, a Roman philosopher. Before AD 207, Egnatius Victor was appointed suffect consul, since in 207 he was the Legatus Augusti pro praetore in Pannonia Superior, which was a proconsular posting.

Egnatius Victor possibly married a daughter of Quintus Hedius Rufus Lollianus Gentianus, and he was probably the father of Lucius Egnatius Victor Lollianus (suffect consul around 225/230) and Egnatia Mariniana, who became the wife of the future emperor Valerian and the mother of the emperor Gallienus. He may also have been the father of Egnatius Victor Marinianus (suffect consul c. 230).

== Sources ==
- Mennen, Inge, Power and Status in the Roman Empire, AD 193-284 (2011)

Political offices
Preceded by Uncertain	Consul suffectus of the Roman Empire before AD 207	Succeeded by Uncertain
