= Egnatia Mariniana =

Wife of Roman Emperor Valerian

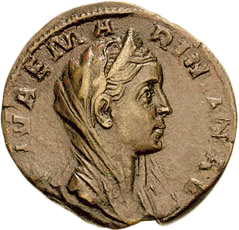
- Sestertius of Mariniana
- Spouse: Valerian
- Children: Gallienus
- Father: Lucius Egnatius Victor

Egnatia Mariniana (fl. c. early 200s CE) was probably the wife of Roman Emperor Valerian and mother of Emperor Gallienus. She died before Valerian's ascension to the throne in 253.

== Life ==
After Valerian became emperor, he had his late wife deified, and created commemorative coins bearing her image. Several coins bearing the legend DIVAE MARINIANAE date back to the beginning of the reign of Valerian and Gallienus. D. Calomino considered that the coins of Mariniana, like those of Paulina and Faustina the Elder, bear the omission of Augusta between Diva and the empress’s personal name in their legends.

Previously it had been assumed that Egnatius Victor Marinianus, legatus, at different times, of Arabia Petraea and Moesia Superior, was the father of Mariniana. More recently however, it has been postulated that she was the daughter of Lucius Egnatius Victor, suffect consul before 207, and therefore Egnatius Victor Marinianus' sister.

== Sources ==
- Mennen, Inge, Power and Status in the Roman Empire, AD 193-284 (2011)
