= Marinianus (consul 268) =

Son of Roman Emperor Gallienus (c. 249 – 268)

Marinianus was Roman consul in the year 268, under Emperor Gallienus. He was related to the Egnatia gens and has been speculated to be the cousin, son or nephew of Emperor Gallienus. Marinianus and Valerianus Minor (Gallienus' brother), were killed during the autumn of 268 in a purge of Gallienus' partisans.

== Notes ==
Political offices
Preceded by Ovinius Paternus, Arcesilaus, Postumus, Victorinus	Roman consul 268 with Aspasius Paternus, Postumus	Succeeded by Claudius Gothicus, Paternus, Victorinus, Sanctus
