= Cornelia Gallonia =

Possible wife of Roman emperor Valerian

Cornelia Gallonia was possibly the name of a Roman empress. She may have been the second wife of Roman emperor Valerian, but her existence is disputed.

== Life ==
Her existence is inferred from an inscription from Bulzi in Sardinia, published by R. Zucca in 2004, which names her as Augusta and wife of Valerian. Ilkka Syvänne has proposed that she may have been related to empress Cornelia Salonina, who was the wife of Valerian's son Gallienus.

However, the inscription from Bulzi is striking in its published form, as it contains a number of highly unusual formulations and textual elements, and the reconstructed text raises several logical problems. Therefore, M. Heil and W. Eck assume that the reading and reconstruction of the inscription by R. Zucca are flawed. This is also supported by the fact that Cornelia Gallonia is not mentioned in any other source from this period as a member of the imperial family, even though members of the imperial household, especially during the time of the soldier emperors (235–284), were consistently presented in public, not only in inscriptions but also in coinage. According to Heil and Eck, the absence of any reliable source evidence leads to the most probable conclusion that the Empress Cornelia Gallonia never existed. It is possible that the inscription from Bulzi is based on a confusion with Cornelia Salonina, the wife of Gallienus, the son of Valerian.

== See also ==
- Gallonia gens
