= Egnatius Victor Marinianus =

3rd century Roman military officer and senator

Egnatius Victor Marinianus (fl. 3rd century) was a Roman military officer and senator.

== Biography ==
Egnatius Marinianus was a member of the third century gens Egnatia, and it has been speculated that he was the son of Lucius Egnatius Victor, consul suffectus before 207. Sometime before 230 he was the legatus Augusti pro praetore (or imperial governor) of the province of Arabia Petraea. He was eventually appointed consul suffectus in a nundinium around 230. Then sometime after this he again filled the office of legatus Augusti pro praetore, this time in Moesia Superior.

Previously it had been speculated that Egnatius Marinianus was the father of Egnatia Mariniana, who was the wife of Valerian and mother of Gallienus. However, it is now believed that he was probably her brother.

== Sources ==
- Mennen, Inge, Power and Status in the Roman Empire, AD 193-284 (2011)

Political offices
Preceded by Uncertain	Consul suffectus of the Roman Empire around AD 230	Succeeded by Uncertain
