= Siege of Autun =

Siege of Autun may refer to:

- Siege of Autun (269–270), during the Crisis of the Third Century
- Siege of Autun (356), between Romans and Alemanni
- Siege of Autun (534), between Franks and Burgundians
- Siege of Autun (c. 679), during a Frankish civil war
- Siege of Autun (1591), during the French Wars of Religion

== See also ==
- Battle of Autun (disambiguation)
