= Proconsul =

Governor of a province in the Roman republic

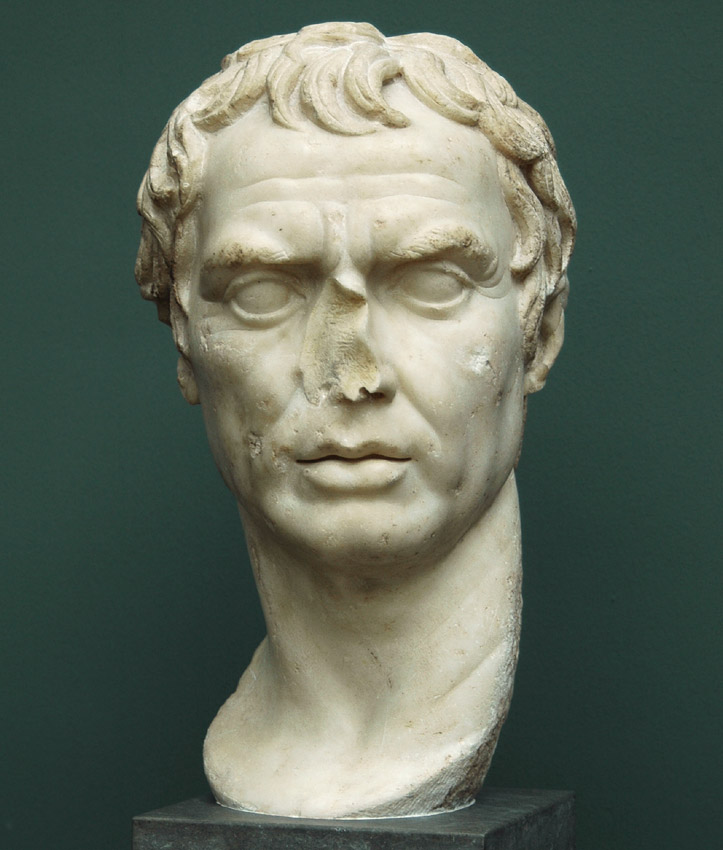
Scipio Africanus, one of Rome's greatest commanders, was a proconsul during the Second Punic War. He was one of the few proconsuls who did not first serve as consul.

A proconsul was an official of ancient Rome who acted on behalf of a consul. The term is also used in recent history for officials with delegated authority. In the Roman Republic, military command, or imperium, could be exercised constitutionally only by a consul. Only two consuls served at a time, each elected to a one-year term. They could not normally serve two terms in a row; if a military campaign was in progress at the end of a consul's term, the consul in command might have his command prorogued, allowing him to continue in command. This custom allowed for continuity of command despite the high turnover of consuls. In the Roman Empire, proconsul was a title held by a civil governor and did not imply military command.

== Etymology ==
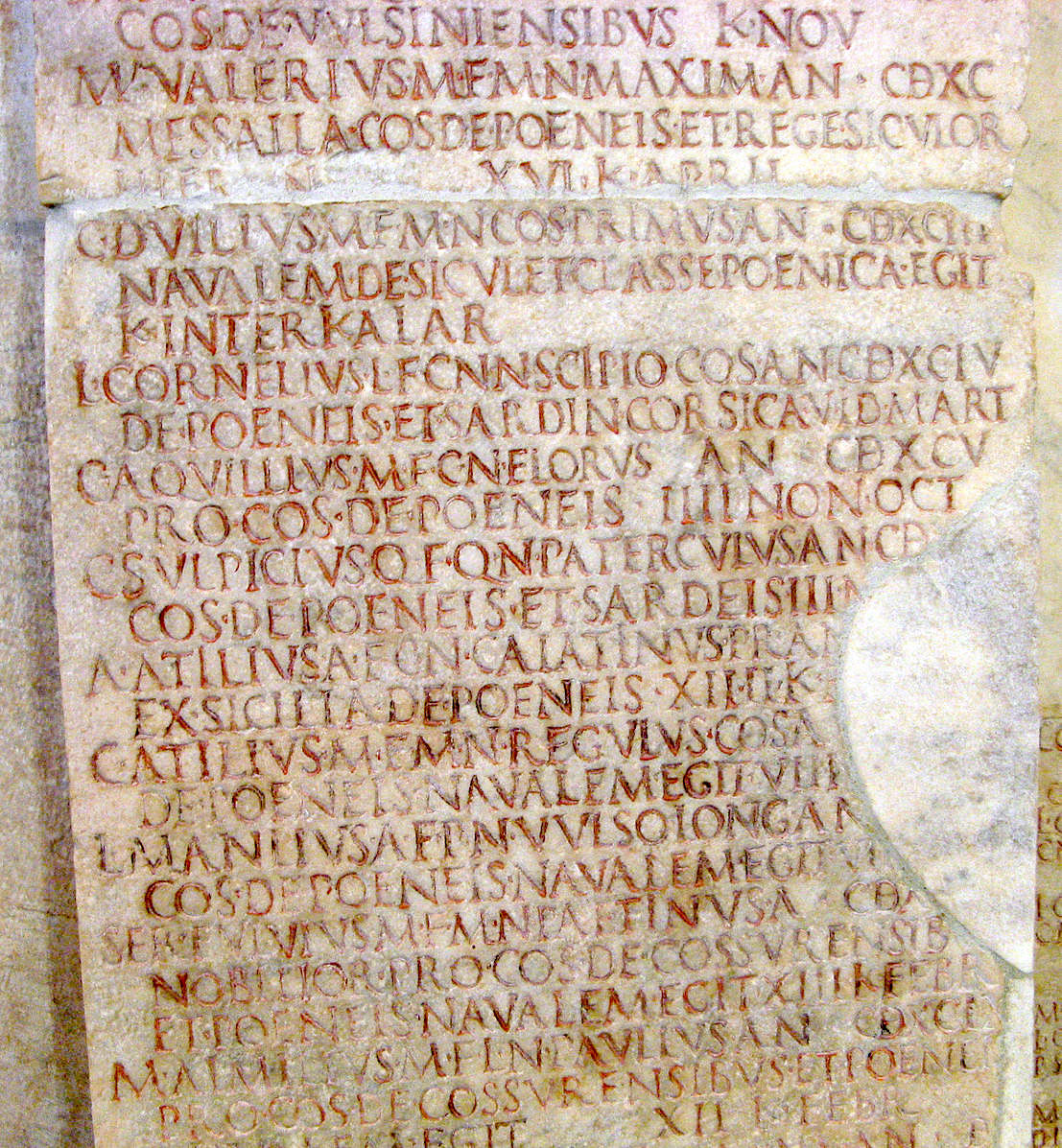
A tablet of Acta Triumphalia is displayed in the Capitoline Museums in Rome. This fragment covers the consulship of Asina and Duilius (260 BC). Two proconsuls are mentioned, C. A. Quillius and M. A. Lucius.

The Latin word prōconsul is a shortened form of prō consule, meaning "(one acting) on behalf of the consul." It appears on inscriptions beginning in 135 BC. Ancient historians describe Quintus Publilius Philo, the first proconsul, as acting prō consule for 326 BC. For later proconsuls, the same sources use the shortened form.

== Roman Republic ==
A proconsul was endowed with full consular authority outside the city of Rome. Cicero notes that this did not include the right to consult auguries: "Our ancestors would not undertake any military enterprise without consulting the auspices; but now, for many years, our wars have been conducted by pro-consuls and propraetors, who do not have the right to take auspices."

The position was created to deal with a constitutional peculiarity of the Roman Republic. Only a consul could command an army, but the high turnover of consuls could disrupt continuity of command. If a consul's term ended in the midst of a campaign, he could be prorogued and continue to command. Quintus Publilius Philo was one of two consuls for the year 327 BC. When his term expired at the end of the year, his army was in the midst of besieging the city of Neapolis (modern Naples). Rather than risk a change of command at such a delicate moment, the people voted that he should "conduct the campaign in place of a consul (prō consule)" after his term expired. Publilius thus became the first proconsul.

With territorial expansion beyond Italy and the annexation of territories as Roman provinces, the proconsul became one of two types of Roman provincial governors. The other was the propraetor. In theory, proconsuls held delegated authority and acted on behalf of the consuls. In practice, a proconsulship was often treated as an extension of a consul's term. This extension applied only outside the city walls of Rome. It was an extension of the military command of the consul, but not of his public office. As the number of Roman legions was increased, there was a need to increase the number of military commanders. The office of the praetor was introduced in 366 BC. The praetors were the chief justices of the city. They were also given imperium so that they could also command an army.

During the Second Samnite War, Rome increased the number of her legions. The position of propraetor was instituted. These were praetors whose imperium was extended and were given the task to command a reserve army. Propraetors had the power to command one army, whereas proconsuls had the power to command two armies. In 307 BC, Quintus Fabius Maximus Rullianus, who was consul the previous year, was elected as proconsul to conduct the campaign in Samnium. During the Third Samnite War (298–290 BC) the consuls of the previous year, Quintus Fabius Maximus Rullianus and Publius Decius Mus, were given a six-month extension of their authority to carry on the war in Samnium. In 291 BC Quintus Fabius Maximus Gurges had his command extended and to carry out mop up operations towards the end of the war. He defeated the Pentri, the largest Samnite tribe.

There were two republican proconsuls who did not previously hold the position of consul. During the Second Punic War (218–201 BC) Scipio Africanus volunteered to lead the second Roman expedition against the Carthaginians in Spain. He was too young to have been a consul. He was made proconsul by a vote of the Popular Assembly. When Scipio left Spain after his victory in 205 BC, Lucius Cornelius Lentulus and Lucius Manlius Acidinus were sent as commanders without public office (sine magistratus). This was done because Manlius Acidinus had not been a consul before.

As Rome acquired territory, the need for provincial governors grew. The province of Sicily was created in 241 BC, while Corsica and Sardinia was created in 238 BC. In 227 BC, two praetors were assigned the administration of these two provinces. Two more praetors were added when the provinces of Hispania Citerior and Hispania Ulterior were created in 197 BC. After this, no praetors were added even when the number of provinces increased. It became customary to extend the authority of consuls and the praetors at the end of their annual terms. The provinces were assigned by lot to proconsuls and propraetors. The proconsuls were assigned the provinces which contained the larger number of troops.

Under Lex Sempronia, enacted in 123 BC, the senate determined the allocation of the provinces before the next consular elections. In 81 BC, Sulla added two praetors so that the two proconsuls and six propraetors could be assigned to govern the ten provinces Rome ruled at that time. Sulla made the governorships annual and required the holder to leave the province within thirty days after the arrival of his successor. In 67 BC, Pompey received extraordinary powers and an unprecedented multiyear proconsulship to deal with the problem of piracy. The "first triumvirate" of Julius Caesar, Pompey and Crassus also received multiyear proconsulships in 59 BC. Marcus Aemilius Lepidus was also granted this power in 38 BC.

== Roman Empire ==
Under the Republic, consuls and proconsuls had raised and commanded armies loyal to themselves. Augustus, Rome's first emperor, replaced these essentially private armies with a standing imperial army. The consuls and proconsuls lost their military authority, but the titles retained considerable prestige. The provinces were divided between imperial provinces, which were under the jurisdiction of the emperor, and senatorial provinces, which were under the jurisdiction of the senate. The imperial provinces were mostly the border provinces, where most of the legions were stationed. This allowed the emperor to retain control of the army. In the senatorial provinces, the governors were called proconsuls. Tenure was generally restricted to one year. According to Suetonius:

The more important provinces, which could not with ease or safety be entrusted to the government of annual magistrates, [Augustus] reserved for his own administration: the rest he distributed by lot amongst the proconsuls; but sometimes he made exchanges, and frequently visited most of both kinds in person.

Augustus decreed that the governors of the senatorial provinces would receive the title proconsul, regardless of whether they had served as praetor or consul. These were chosen by lot, with the result ratified by the Senate. In the imperial provinces, the emperors appointed governors who held the title of legatus Augusti pro praetore, or pro-praetor, regardless of what position they had held previously.

A passage in the New Testament notes that cases might be judged by a proconsul: "If therefore Demetrius and the artisans with him have a complaint against anyone, the courts are open, and there are proconsuls; let them bring charges there against one another." Notitia Dignitatum, an early fifth-century imperial chancery document, mentions three proconsuls but no propraetors. These outranked vicars in precedence, though administratively they were subordinates like all governors. They governed the provinces of: Asia, comprising the central part of the western Anatolian coast; Achaea, comprising the Peloponnese and most of Central Greece; and Africa, the northern part of modern Tunisia.

== Other uses of the word ==
Although "proconsul" is an official title only with respect to magistrates of ancient Rome, the word has also been applied to various British, U.S., and French officials in modern times. A proconsul could be both a rule-following bureaucrat and charismatic personality. The rise of bureaucracy and rapid communication has reduced the scope for proconsular freelancing. Various American commanders and ambassadors have been referred to as proconsuls. Writer Carnes Lord discusses the following figures in the framework of proconsular authority, such as Leonard Wood in Cuba, Lucius D. Clay in Germany, and Paul Bremer in Iraq in 2003.

== See also ==
- Ambassadors and envoys from Russia to Poland (1763–1794)
- Notitia Dignitatum
- Prorogatio, the legal process of extending a Roman command
