= Marcellinus (consul 275) =

3rd century Roman soldier and official

Vir Clarissimus Aurelius/Iulius Marcellinus
- Citizenship: Roman
- Occupations: Soldier, imperial official
- Years active: Third quarter of the 3rd century AD
- Employer(s): Roman Emperors Gallienus and Aurelian, Zenobia of Palmyra?
- Notable work: Fortifications of Verona
- Title: Dux Exercitus (Verona)(?); Vice Praefecti Aegypti; Praefectus Mesopotamiae Rectorque Orientis; Consul Posterior (with Aurelian

Aurelius/Iulius Marcellinus (his nomen is uncertain) was a Roman soldier and Imperial functionary who had a brilliant equestrian career and was elevated to the Senate when he was chosen by the Emperor Aurelian as his consular colleague. (Note: He was ranked Consul Posterior denoting that he was second in order of precedence of the two consuls who gave their names to the year 275 AD according to the Roman chronological practice. His consular colleague, Aurelian, as emperor, naturally ranked as Consul Prior.) His appointment as Consul is thought to have been a reward for his loyalty and steadfastness in 273 when, as Aurelian's deputy in charge of the eastern provinces of the Empire where the authority of the Imperial Government had only recently been restored, he resisted attempts to suborn him by a rebellious faction in the city of Palmyra.

His promotion was unusual in that he had not achieved the rank of Praetorian Prefect, the level of seniority in the Imperial Service at which equestrian officials might hope to be elevated to the Senate. However, this practice, which was to become a regular feature during the reign of Diocletian, was still inchoate in 275 AD.

Obviously a man of considerable capabilities who had attracted the Imperial patronage of Emperor Gallienus and whose services continued to be much valued by Aurelian, the paucity of the surviving records means that even the identity of Marcellinus is uncertain while nothing else is known of his life beyond the bare outlines recounted here.

== Early life ==
There is no record of Marcellinus's origins or early life.

== Career ==
=== Service in Verona ===
Scholarly opinion is in agreement that the first reference to Marcellinus is from an inscription that places him in Verona around 265 AD. However, the matter of his identity is complicated by the fact that his consular reference does not include a nomen while the Verona inscription names two Marcellini either of whom may have been the Consul Posterior of 275 AD.

The first Marcellinus referred to in this inscription by order of seniority had the nomen Aurelius. He is described as a Vir Perfectissimus (Note: Vir Perfectissimus is the honorific pertaining to officials of the second class of the Equestrian Order. It indicates a close connection with leading court-circles if not the Emperor himself.) and a dux (Note: Some confusion has arisen as to Marcellinus's exact status as the inscription hasVP duc duc which can be read as the ablative form of Vir Perfectissimus Dux Ducenarius - i.e., suggesting that, as well as being a Dux of prefectissimate rank, Marcellinus was a Ducenarius - a class of officials graded as in receipt of an annual stipend of 200,000 sesterces (although by the mid-Third Century this is unlikely to have represented their actual salary). Some historians accept that this was possible. Others query the notion: for instance, the PIR editors suggest that the second duc in the inscription title may have been an erroneous repetition while Christol asserts that duces were always members of the perfectissimate whereas the Ducenarii are understood to have belonged to the third class of the equestrians who were distinguished by the honorific Egregius (lit., 'Outstanding Man'). By this reckoning Marcellinus could not have been at once a Dux and a Ducenarius.) - in other words, a senior officer carrying out a specific commission for the ruling Emperor (Gallienus). His task in Verona was to fortify the city.

The second Marcellinus referred to in the Verona inscription had the nomen Iulius, and his status was Vir Egregius. (Note: See previous footnote.) He was probably a serving soldier. His rank is not indicated, but he may have been either a tribunus or a praefectus legionis. He was associated with the fortification of Verona and he may have served under Aurelius Marcellinus.

The fortification of Verona formed part of an extensive series of defensive works around and within Italy undertaken by Gallienus in the wake of the barbarian assaults of the later-250s. They were begun in April of the year in which Valerian, the brother of the Gallienus, was consul for the second time with Lucilius as his posterior - i.e. 265 AD - and were finished in September.

=== Service in Alpes Cottiae ===
Iulius Marcellinus is identified with a man of the same name recorded in an epigraphic inscription from Segusio in Alpes Cottiae. He is described as a Vir Perfectissimus indicating that, since his tour of duty in Verona, he had been promoted and given an office in which he was directly responsible to the Emperor. The surviving inscription does not specify the ruling Emperor or whether his office was military or civilian in its nature.

=== Service in Egypt ===
A Iulius Marcellinus is recorded in a papyrological source as Praefectus of Egypt in 271 AD. How he came to this office is uncertain. He may have been the deputy of Tenagino Probus who agreed to serve the Palmyrene regime after his chief's death, vice praefecti, according to the Roman practice when an official died in office, until the appointment of Statilius Ammianus in the spring of 271. On the other hand, he may have tried to continue the fight against the Palmyrene takeover of Egypt after the defeat of Tenagino Probus, although this notion is now generally scouted in academe. It was also conjectured that it was he, not Probus, the future emperor, who undertook the recovery of Egypt when Aurelian launched his war on Zenobia.

It is generally assumed that he is to be identified with the Iulius Marcellinus of the Verona inscription although there is no specific evidence supporting this. (Note: However, the PLRE does not comment on the matter, either one way or the other.)

=== Imperial viceroy in the East ===
Following the restoration of the authority of the central government over the eastern provinces after his defeat of Zenobia in 272 AD Aurelian appointed a Marcellinus as his deputy in those regions (Note: The extent of the regions that came under Marcellinus's viceregal authority is not known. Zosimus may have assumed that his remit coincided with the Diocese of the Oriens of his own day which included Libya, Egypt, the Levant, including Arabia and Mesopotamia and the eastern parts of the Anatolian peninsula. However, it may be that in the Third Century AD the Oriens referred to the provinces of Anatolia, the Levant and Arabia/Mesopotamia. These seem to have been the parts of the empire ruled by Valerian while Egypt was the responsibility of Gallienus.) possibly with the title Praefectus Mesopotamiae rectorque Orientis. (Note: Zosimus merely calls him Prefect of Mesopotamia and the East. It is generally assumed that his actual title was Praefectus Mesopotamiae Rectorque Orientis, but it may well have been Praefectus Totius Orientis.) Unfortunately the source of this information, Zosimus, does not indicate this Marcellinus's nomen. Academic opinion seems agreed that he was one of the two men of that name mentioned on the Verona Inscription, but divided as to whether he was 'Aurelius' or 'Iulius'. (Note: The weight of opinion favours identification with Aurelius, i.e., PLRE, Watson and Southern. Christol too seems to argue in favour of Aurelius even though he actually suggests Iulius. Saunders comes down in favour of Iulius while admitting that the incomplete and fragmentary nature of the evidence makes certainty of identification impossible. Inge Mennen favours Iulius.)

Like the Emperors Marcus Aurelius and Philip the Arab before him, Aurelian obviously considered that the government of the vast territories that comprised the Empire required the presence of a loyal subordinate in the East who could be trusted to exercise Imperial authority in that region on his behalf without attempting to usurp the principate. With such a subordinate he himself could turn his attention to the task of defending the Balkans and restoring his Imperial authority in the rebel Gallic provinces undistracted. (Note: The Emperor Valerian too had divided the Empire in this way, but he had taken responsibility for the East himself and made his son, Gallienus, his co-Augustus in the West.) The appointment of Marcellinus to this position suggests that, even if he had been in Egypt during the Palmyrene takeover, his apparent readiness to come to terms with Zenobia's regime there had not served to undermine the confidence that Aurelian must have had in him as the man he could trust to act as his viceroy in the East. The details of his mandate as Rector Orientis are unknown, but he must have been given the general responsibility for overseeing the re-integration of the Eastern provinces into the body of the Empire and for managing relations with the Sassanid Empire beyond the Euphrates frontier.

His loyalty to Aurelian was put to the test in the spring of 273 after Aurelian had returned to the Balkans. According to Zosimus he was approached by a representative of a revanchiste faction in Palmyra, Apsaeus, who offered him his support if Marcellinus rebelled against Aurelian and sought to usurp the Imperial authority. Marcellinus temporized, pretending to consider this offer, while secretly sending word to Aurelian notifying him of the dangers of the situation. Despairing of attracting Marcellinus to their cause, the Palmyrenes raised a pretender to the throne, one Septimius Antiochus, and massacred the garrison that Aurelian had left in the city. Obviously deciding not to move against the rebels with his own forces, Marcellinus waited for Aurelian to return and crush them.

It is thought that Marcellinus remained en poste after this episode which suggests that Aurelian considered that he had handled the crisis occasioned by the Palmyrene uprising correctly. However, it was Aurelian rather than his viceroy who then went on to Egypt to suppress the separatist rebellion that took place in that province under Firmus: Marcellinus is not recorded as having had any part in that affair even though Egypt might have been expected to fall within his area of responsibility.

=== Consul Posterior ===
In 275 AD a Marcellinus is named as Consul Posterior with Aurelian as Prior. It is usually assumed that this must have been the Marcellinus who had been Aurelian's viceroy of the Oriens in 273 and was a reward for his steadiness in the face of the Palmyrene rebels.

It is possible that Marcellinus accompanied Aurelian on his last journey to the East and was present when the Emperor was murdered by his officers in Thracia. it is also suggested that it was he who persuaded the grieving army to offer the choice of the next Emperor to the Senate. However, this proposition does not seem to be generally accepted by recent historians.

The promotion of high equestrian officials to the senatorial aristocracy via appointment to the consulate was still a comparatively recent phenomenon in the 270s. After the fall of Septimius Severus's Praetorian Prefect, Gaius Fulvius Plautianus (205 AD), the practice of honouring senior officials in this way had fallen out of favour until the elevation of Gallienus's Praetorian prefect, Lucius Petronius Taurus Volusianus, in 260 AD. After Volusianus the only other comparable honorand had been Aurelian's Praetorian Prefect, Iulius Placidianus, who shared the consulate with that prince in 273 AD while retaining his equestrian office. It is not known if Marcellinus continued to hold any of the great equestrian prefectures after his elevation to the Senate nor is he known to have held any of the great senatorial magistracies, in particular the office of Praefectus Urbi. This was to become standard practice in the case of those who achieved the praetorian prefecture and some of the other great equestrian offices under Diocletian, but it was not until the sole reign of Constantine the Great that the process of converging the highest equestrian offices with senatorial status was completed.

== Works cited ==
=== Works of reference, Abbreviations ===
- PIR(2) - Prosopographia imperii Romani; E. Groag et al. (eds.); Berlin; 1933-;
- PLRE - The prosopography of the later Roman Empire; Jones, A.H.M., Martindale, J.R. and Morris, J. (eds.); Cambridge University Press; 1971–1992.

=== Primary sources ===
- The Augustan History: Life of the Deified Aurelian Vita Divi Aureliani (SHA DA) Aureliani*.htm;
- Mommsen, Theodor; Pearse, Roger, eds. (2006) [1892]. "Part 8: List (fasti) of the consuls to 354 AD". Chronography of 354. The Tertullian Project. (Chronography 354 AD)
- Zosimus: New History Book 1 (Zos).

=== Secondary sources ===
- Bray, J. (1995) "Gallienus". (Bray);
- Christol, Michel (1978) "Un duc dans une inscription de Termessos (Pisidie)". Chiron 8: 529–40 - (Christol (1978));
- Christol, Prof. M. (1986) Essai sur l'Ėvolution des Carrières Sénatoriales dans le 2e Moitié du 3e Siécle ap. J.C., Nouvelles Éditions Latines, Paris - (Christol (1986));
- Mennen, Inge (2011) "Power and Status in the Roman Empire, ad 193–284", Brill, Leiden & Boston - (Mennen (2011));
- Pflaum, H.-G. (1960–61) "Les carrières procuratoriennes sous le Haut Empire Romaine", Paris - (Pflaum (1960–61));
- Potter, D. (2004) "The Roman empire at Bay: AD 180-395", Routledge, London & New York - (Potter (2004));
- Salway, B. (2006) "Equestrian prefects and the award of senatorial honours from the Severans to Constantine", in: A. Kolb (ed.), "Herrschafsstrukturen und Herrschaftspraxis", Berlin, 115–135. (Salway (2006));
- Saunders, Randall Titus (1992). "A biography of the Emperor Aurelian". Ann Arbor, Michigan 48106-1346: UMI Dissertation Services - (Saunders (1992));
- Southern, Pat (2001) The Roman Empire from Severus to Constantine, Routledge, London & New York (Southern (2001));
- Southern, Pat (2008) Empress Zenobia: Palmyra's Rebel Queen, Continuum, London & New York - (Southern (2008));
- Watson, Alaric. (1999) Aurelian and the Third Century - (Watson (1999)).

Political offices
| Preceded by Aurelian and Capitolinus | Consul of the Roman Empire with Aurelian; 275 | Succeeded by Marcus Claudius Tacitus and Aemilianus |
