= Caelia Macrina =

Ancient Roman philanthropist

Caelia Macrina was a Roman woman who lived in Tarracina around 150 AD.

In 150 AD, Caelia Macrina left money for the construction of a building in Tarracina, Italy, and at the same time endowed an alimentary fund (to provide cash grants for food) for 200 children. Alimentary grants could either be private or governmental, and were customarily larger for boys than for girls. The shorter period allowed for girls to receive support reflects their younger age at marriage (often 13 or 14 years). Caelia followed this pattern but was more generous to girls than was usual.

An inscription remains on the building which Caelia Macrina endowed:

Caelia Macrina, daughter of Gaius, by her will ordered 300,000 sesterces to be used [for the construction of this building]. She left … sesterces for its decoration and maintenance. To the people of Tarracina, in memory of her son Macer, she left 1,000,000 sesterces, so that the income from the money might be given to 100 boys [and to 100 girls] under the title of ‘alimenta’; 5 denarii [= 20 sesterces] each month to each citizen boy up to the age of 16, and; 4 denarii [= 16 sesterces] each month to each citizen girl up to the age of 14, so that 100 boys and 100 girls might always be receiving [the grant] in succession.

— Translation from the Latin, Tarracina, 2nd century AD (CIL X.6328=ILS 6278.Tr.J.C.Fant.L)

From among the roughly twelve hundred inscriptions that attest to civic patrons within the Roman Empire, eighteen indicate that women received the honorary title of ‘patron of the community’ (patrona civitatis).

== See also ==
- Alimenta
- Women in ancient Rome
- Patronage in ancient Rome
- Evergetism
