= Cura annonae =

Import and distribution of grain in Rome and Constantinople

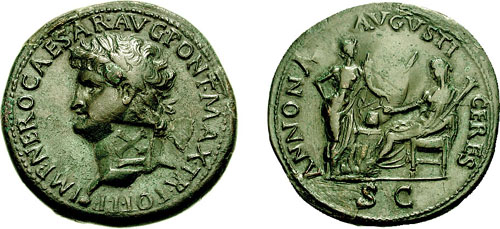
Neronian coin; the reverse shows the earliest known depiction of Annona, personification of the grain supply, standing before enthroned grain goddess Ceres, whose temple was the site of the grain-dole

In Imperial Rome, cura annonae (lit. 'care of the grain') was the logistics system which procured and distributed grain for the cities of Rome and, after its foundation, Constantinople. The city of Rome imported all the grain consumed by its population, estimated to number 1,000,000 by the 2nd century AD. This included recipients of the grain dole or corn dole, (Note: The term "corn" is used in its non-U.S. sense, referring to wheat, or any cereal grain in general. Maize (known in the UK as "Indian corn" or sweetcorn) was not known in Europe at the time; the grain dole chiefly consisted of durum wheat.) a state-run social welfare program which gave out heavily subsidized and later free grain or bread to about 200,000 of Rome's adult male citizens. (Note: "Ninety per cent of all inscriptions that record this word [annona] actually refer to grain that was locally purchased and consumed in the cities of the Empire, and does not have anything to do with the grain dole of the capital." Vandevoorde, 2015, paragraph 59.)

Rome's grain subsidies were originally ad hoc emergency measures taken to import cheap grain from trading partners and allies at times of scarcity, to help feed growing numbers of indebted and dispossessed citizen-farmers. The programmes expanded over time, such that by the end of the Republican era, the grain dole was a permanent social welfare program which comprised a substantial part of the state budget. The grain dole was reluctantly adopted by Augustus and later emperors as a free monthly issue to those who qualified to receive it. In 22 AD, Augustus' successor Tiberius publicly acknowledged the cura annonae as a personal and imperial duty, which if neglected would cause "the utter ruin of the state".

During the Imperial Era, a regular and predictable supply of subsidised grain, the grain dole, and sumptuous public games such as gladiator contests and chariot racing earned the obedience of potentially restive lower-class urban citizens, providing what the poet Juvenal sarcastically summed up as "bread and circuses". Sufficient capacity to supply the Cura system required both adequate production in the provinces and the operation of massive numbers of ships, generally privately owned and hired by the government, to transport it to Rome. Most of Rome's grain supply was grown, imported, stored and traded as a profitable commodity, funded by speculators and hoarders, using loans, not state subsidies. Some provinces were almost entirely given over to the production of grain for consumption in Roman cities. The most important sources of bread grain, mostly durum wheat, were Roman Egypt, North Africa (21st century Libya, Tunisia, Algeria, and Morocco), and Sicily. When the Vandals took over most of these provinces (c. 439), the Western Roman Empire lost the greater part of its grain supply.

Some form of cura annonae may have persisted as late as the 6th century for Rome, but far less grain was shipped compared to earlier periods; in Constantinople, capital of the Eastern Roman Empire, it lasted as late as the 7th century, in reduced form. The population of the city of Rome declined precipitously during the last years of the Western Roman Empire. Until the introduction of the railway in the 19th century, no other city was able to organize the extensive logistics needed to sustain a program resembling the cura annonae.

== History of the grain dole ==
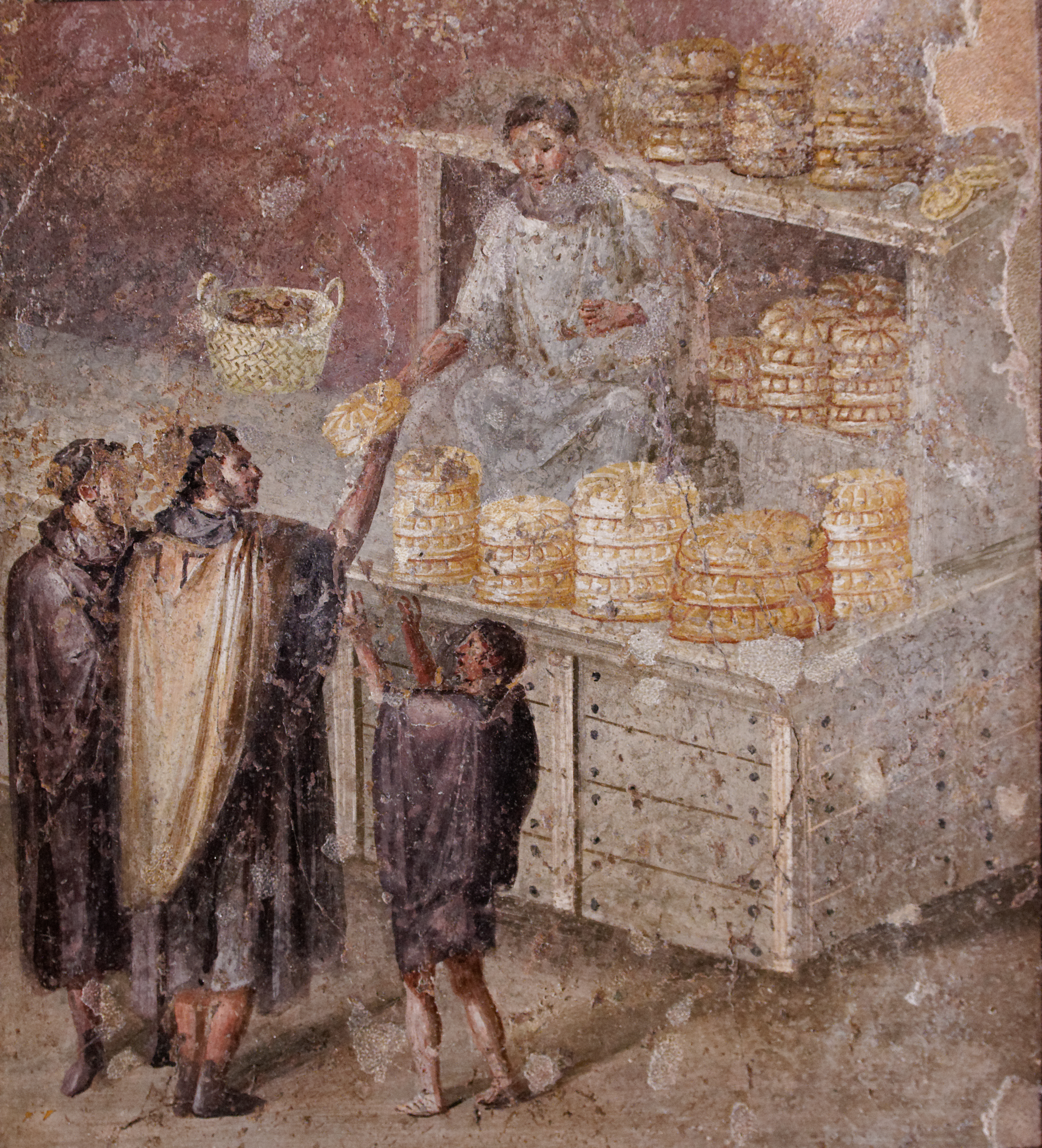
A bread stall, from a Pompeiian wall painting

The city of Rome grew rapidly in the centuries of the Roman Republic and Empire, reaching a population approaching 1,000,000 in the 2nd century AD. The wars of the early Republic led directly to the expansion of Roman territory, the acquisition of arable land, and land hunger for Rome's least powerful, impoverished citizens. Landholding was the material basis of male Roman citizenship, and land distribution remained a major issue throughout Rome's history. Most commoner-citizens were also farmers, either as small landowners or as tenants. They could be conscripted to serve in the military, with minimal recompense, on campaigns that could last for years. In peacetime, the same commoner-soldiers relied on whatever crops they could raise on their own land, weather permitting, with very little capacity to produce a surplus for trading.

Roman staples were grains, especially wheat; olives and olive oil, grapes and wine; and cheese. In a good year, and with favourable weather, a grain harvest could yield around ten times what had been sown. Farms within Rome's vicinity were used to raise equally essential but more perishable crops. Although farmland taken from conquered enemies was legally ager publicus (publicly owned farmland), most was swallowed up by the wealthy and powerful, who found that grapes and wine were more profitable commodities than grain.

In lean years, subsistence farmers might have no option other than borrowing from their patrons or landlords. Some of them accumulated levels of debt that proved impossible to pay off and were forced to sell their farms or surrender their tenancies and either work for the new owner or move to a city with their families and seek patronage there. According to Roman historical tradition, the Roman government intervened sporadically to obtain and distribute free or subsidized grain to Rome's more impoverished male citizens during shortages and famines. The terms of these early provisions are lost.

A version of an earlier Lex Licinia was proposed by Gaius Gracchus, and approved by the Roman popular assembly in 123 BC, in the face of extreme opposition from politically conservative landowners. Eventually, adult male Roman citizens (over approximately 14 years of age) with an income or property under a certain value were entitled to buy 33 kilograms (73 lb) grain per month at a below-market price of five modii. The qualifying income threshold is not known, but according to Caesar's municipal legislation of 44 BC, landlords of tenement blocks helped compile lists of persons who might qualify to receive grain; two aediles Cereales, civic-religious officials who served the grain goddess Ceres, patron goddess of the plebs, were made responsible for its distribution.

Initially, about 40,000 adult males were eligible. In 58 BC, Clodius gave an estimated 320,000 citizens free issue of grain. This was reduced to 150,000 by Julius Caesar and increased to 200,000 by Augustus Caesar, who disapproved of a permanent grain dole but took personal responsibility for the free supply, as did all emperors after him. The number of beneficiaries remained more or less stable until near the end of the Western Roman Empire. In the early Roman Empire, the requirements of the grain dole are thought to account for 15–33% of Rome's imported grain. A large part of the city's supply was obtained through the free market. Prices in the city were invariably higher than elsewhere, and merchants could count on making a profit. Some of the grain collected as tax in kind was distributed to officials and soldiers and some was sold at market rates.

In the 3rd century AD, the dole of grain was replaced by bread, probably during the reign of Septimius Severus (193–211 AD). Severus also began providing olive oil to residents of Rome, and later the Emperor Aurelian (270–275) ordered the distribution of wine and pork. From the late second century, under the rule of the Severan dynasty, food provision for Rome's military came under the rubric annonae militaris, a form of requisition that might be met through coin or payment in kind, preferably as trade surpluses but otherwise "siphoned off more or less forcefully" from local civilian economies; the needs of the military had always been prioritised over the needs of civilians. The doles of bread, olive oil, wine, and pork apparently continued until near the end of the Western Roman Empire in 476 AD, although the decline in the population of the city of Rome reduced the overall quantities required.

== Supply ==
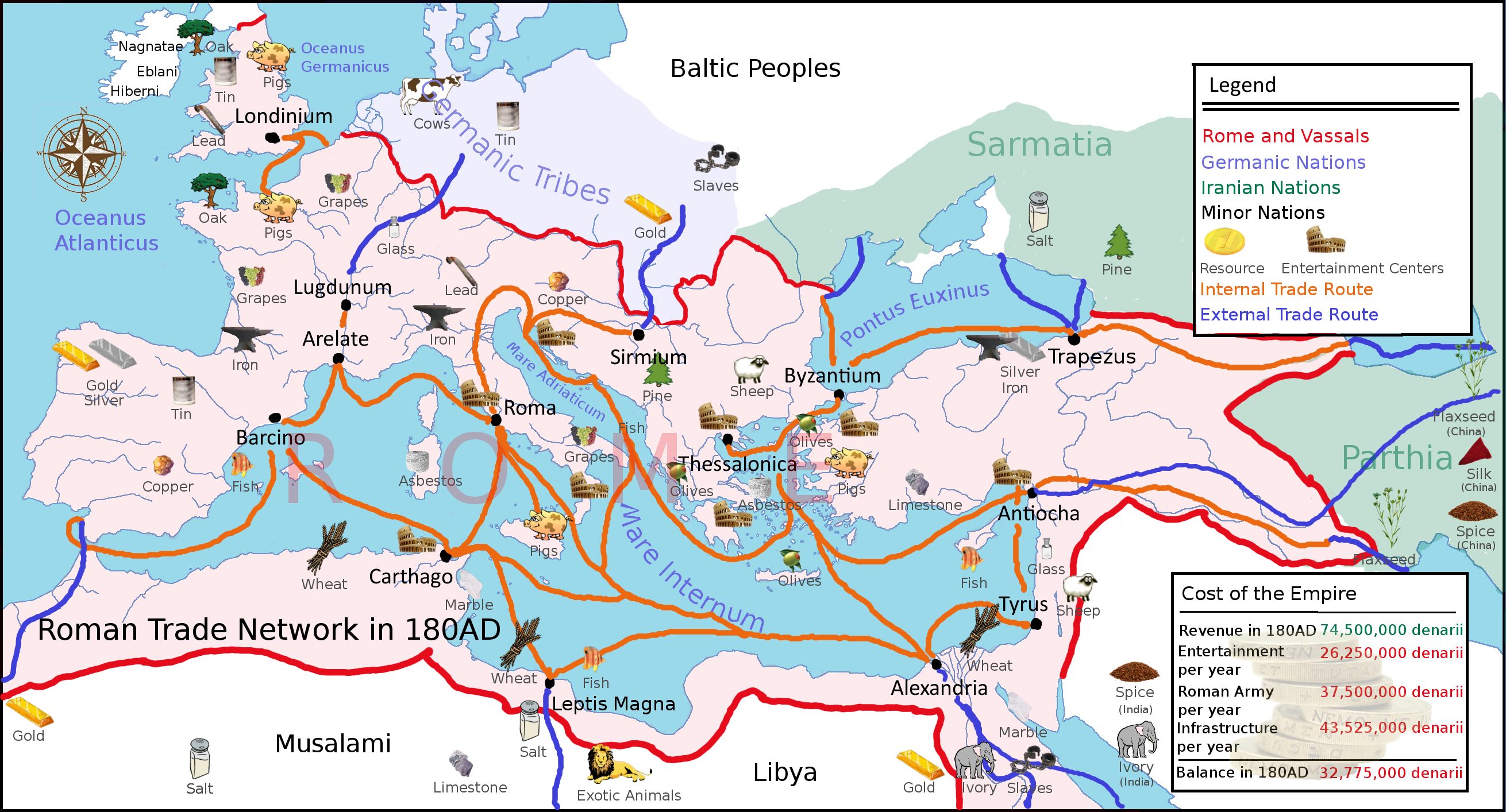
Roman trade routes, 180

A regular grain supply for Rome depended on good harvests elsewhere, an efficient system of transport, storage and distribution, and honest investors willing to underwrite the risks in return for a share. The Prefect of the Imperial annona had an office and grain stores in Ostia, Portus, purpose-built by Claudius and enlarged by Trajan, and almost certainly the same facilities in the ports of supply, such as Alexandria. The trading mechanisms employed were already in place during the Republican era, when agents, merchants and wealthy freedmen negotiated with members of Rome's senatorial and equestrian classes to fund grain imports, and find favour with the Roman masses.

The risks were high but so were the rewards. As a slightly lesser but highly capable form of Roman nobility, the equestrian class were free to openly carry on whatever respectable business they chose; senators, as major landowners, were supposedly indifferent to personal profit or loss, but were the main source of investment. The elder Cato, senator and consul, seems to have been typical in using his most capable freedmen as agents, factors and merchants. In a fleet of 50 grain transports, he underwrote the purchase and cost of a single ship and its grain complement. Any profit, or loss, was shared by all fifty investors.

The economies of some provinces were almost entirely dependent on grain exports, paying tribute or taxes in kind, rather than coin. Rome had a particular interest in the social and political stability of such provinces, and their protection. By the late 200s BC, grain was being shipped to the city of Rome from the provinces of Sicily and Sardinia. In the second century BC, Gaius Gracchus settled 6,000 colonists to exploit the fertile lands of newly conquered Carthage, giving each about 25 hectares (62 acres) to grow grain. Carthage thus became a major contributor to the annona.

In the first century BC, the three major sources of Roman wheat were Sardinia, Sicily, and the north African region, centered on the ancient city of Carthage, in present-day Tunisia. Sailing time one-way from Sicily to Rome's port of Ostia Antica was about four days. From Carthage sailing time was about nine days. With the incorporation of Egypt into the Roman Empire and the direct rule of the Emperor Augustus (27 BC – 14 AD), Egypt became Rome's main source of grain. By the 70s, the historian Josephus was claiming that Africa fed Rome for eight months of the year and Egypt only four. Although that statement may ignore grain from Sicily, and overestimate the importance of Africa, there is little doubt among historians that Africa and Egypt were the most important sources of grain for Rome.

Bread was by far the most important single commodity in the Roman diet. Rickman estimates that Rome needed 40 million modii (272,000 tonnes) of grain per year to feed its population. Erdkamp estimates a minimum annual requirement of 150,000 tonnes, assuming an annual consumption of 200 kilograms (440 lb) per capita by a total population estimated at 750,000 to 1,000,000. Mattingly and Aldrete estimate the imported grain at 237,000 tonnes for 1,000,000 inhabitants, providing 2,326 calories daily per person from grain alone.

The recipients of the grain dole were a small, low status but privileged group of citizens, the plebs frumentaria. Their 5 modii monthly allowance was "ample for two people but well below the minimum subsistence allowance for three". Those not qualifying for the dole, or those who had to supplement their dole to feed themselves and their families were forced to buy grain at inflated prices, find patronage, go into debt or go without. Augustus doubled the allowance for some of those already entitled, but this seems to have been an exceptional, ad hoc solution. The precise details of how grain was marketed in Rome are a "major puzzle".

== Shipping ==
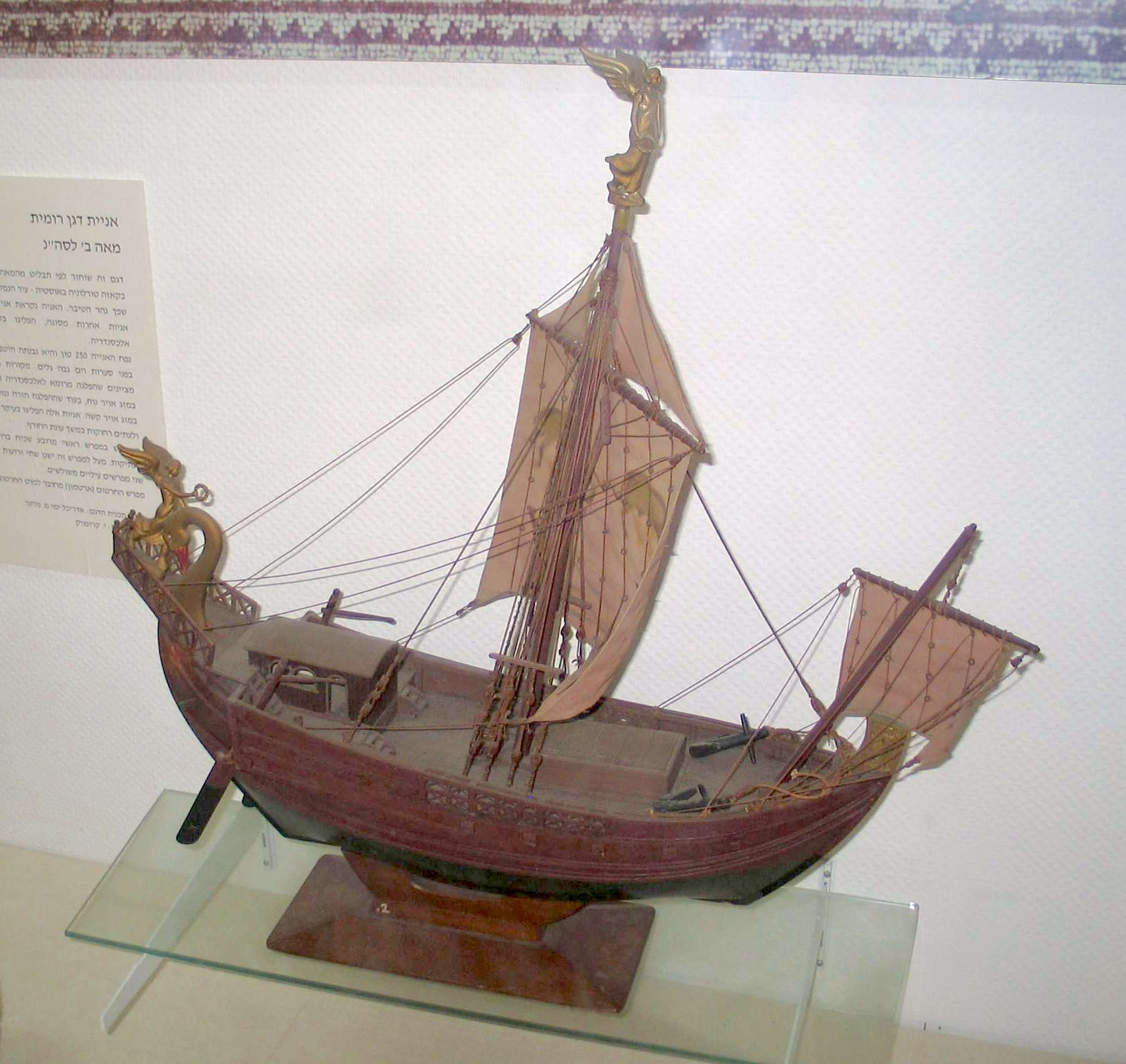
A model of a small Roman grain ship. Large ones had three masts.

Alexandria, Egypt and its port, 30 BC

The shipping lanes that connected Rome with its centers of grain supply had strategic importance. Whoever controlled the grain supply had a measure of control over the city of Rome, which depended on timely arrivals of imported grain, outsourced to civilian merchants and their fleets. In most years, Rome's state grain stores were severely depleted by the end of winter. There were obvious advantages in stockpiling several years worth of harvest to create very large grain surpluses and keep prices low; the Historia Augusta, claims that Severus left "7 years worth of grain tribute" to the Roman people. The same strategy was used to very different effect by civilian corn-factors who hoarded grain to simulate shortages and raise grain prices on the open market.

The provision of grain to Rome was a major shipping and administrative task. It was "cheaper to ship grain from one end of the Mediterranean to the other" than "to cart it by land some 75 miles [120 kilometers]." Kesler and Temin calculate that Rome's grain supply in the early Empire required a total of 2,000 to 3,000 merchant voyages annually, with each vessel carrying an average of 70,000 kg, sometimes much more.

Sailing times from the ports of Ostia (near Rome) and Puteoli (near Naples) to Alexandria in Egypt might be as brief as 14 days, with the wind behind. Like almost all non-military ships, large grain transports were propelled by sail, not oars. Returning to Rome would take much longer as the winds were adverse and ships had to tack a course, hugging coastlines when possible. "The voyage...from Alexandria to Rome was a continuous fight against foul winds." Lionel Casson estimated that average time for the voyage was nearly 70 days.

Casson estimates that the outward-bound freighters "raced down from Ostia or Puteoli to Alexandria with the wind on their heels in ten days to two weeks" and the voyage back laden with grain "...took at least a month and on occasion two or more." Given the time needed for loading and unloading, the larger grain ships traversing the Egypt to Rome route likely only completed one round trip per year. Several round trips per year could be accomplished from North Africa or Sicily.

=== Grain from Egypt ===
The harvest season for grain in ancient Egypt was from April to early June. The annual Nile flood began in June and thus harvest had to be finished before the river's waters covered the land. The grain in Egypt was apparently acquired by Rome as a tax on farmers. The grain was moved mostly by barge on the various distributaries of the Nile River to Lake Mareotis bordering the southern part of the city of Alexandria. There it was inspected for quality and, when accepted, transported by canal to the port of Alexandria, the Great Harbor, where it was loaded onto ships for Rome.

=== Grain from North Africa ===
Twenty-nine Mediterranean ports, excluding those in Egypt, have been identified as possible grain exporters from North Africa to Rome. The largest was probably Carthage. Given the lack of navigable rivers in the region, grain had to be transported to these ports by road, suggesting that because of the cost of land transport, the grain was grown in close proximity to the ports. Road transport was slow and costly, using four-wheeled carts drawn by four oxen. Each cart carried 350 kilograms (770 lb) to 500 kilograms (1,100 lb). Grain from ancient Cyraenica (Libya) may have been important because an early harvest there could supply Rome before other grain-producing regions had been harvested. In Rome, the arrival of the first fleets of grain ships after harvest was an eagerly awaited annual event.

=== From Ostia to Rome ===
On arrival in the port of Ostia, Rome's port at the mouth of the Tiber, the grain was off-loaded from its transport ship and loaded onto barges which were hauled up the river by animal or man power to the city of Rome, approximately 30 kilometres (19 mi) upriver. On arrival in Rome, the grain was stored in large warehouses, called horrea, until needed. Most horrea from the 1st century AD onwards were state-owned.

== Ships ==
Hundreds or even thousands of ships were required to transport grain to Rome. Some had a capacity of 50,000 modii (350 tonnes) or more. Ships of much larger capacity are suggested in Lucian and the Acts of the Apostles but like most ancient estimations, are likely exaggerations. Grain transport at sea presented special problems. The grain had to be thoroughly dried to retard germination, and reduce spoilage by pests such as grain weevils, beetles, mildew and molds. It was transported in sacks, from start to finish, not carried loose in the holds of ships. It had to be well secured, and dry; unstable cargoes could lead to capsizing in rough weather; wet grain rapidly germinated, expanded, and could split a ship open.

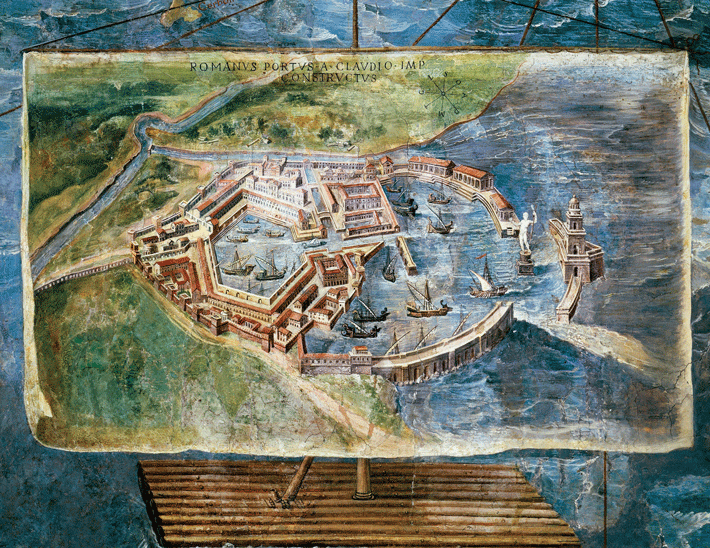
An idealized plan of Portus, constructed about 113 AD to serve the city of Rome

Lucian, c. 150 AD, describes a very large grain ship taking shelter in the port of Piraeus, Greece. Lucian writes that the Isis was 55 metres (180 ft) in length and had a beam of more than a quarter of that. From the deck to the bottom of the cargo hold was 13 metres (43 ft). Casson accepts Lucan's measurements and calculates the ship's cargo capacity at 1200 to 1300 tonnes of grain. Rickman describes Lucian's figures as a possible exaggeration; Hopkins points out the financial losses represented by the foundering of such a ship in bad weather, heavy-laden with grain and too large to find safe mooring in most ports. The reported dimensions for grain ships are not verified by archaeological findings.

Casson imaginatively reconstructed a typical grain-ship's voyage from Alexandria, Egypt to Rome. A grain ship leaving Alexandria, would first steer north east to Cyprus, then follow the south coast of Asia Minor (21st century Turkey) westwards, and proceed along the south shore of Crete, stopping as needed at one of several ports en route. From Crete the grain ship would strike out across the Mediterranean Sea westwards toward the island of Malta, the objective being Syracuse, Sicily and the Straits of Messina. After passing through the Straits, large grain ships would dock at the port of Puteoli, near Naples, or after port improvements about 60 AD, at Portus near Rome. From Puteoli the cargo of the large ships would be off-loaded onto smaller ships and taken to Ostia. Smaller ships coming from North Africa or Egypt could proceed directly to Ostia for unloading.

=== The voyage of Paul ===
The experience of Paul the Apostle in 62 AD illustrates the dangers of the voyage from Egypt to Rome. Paul boarded a Rome-bound grain ship in Asia Minor. The ship was large, with 276 people aboard, counting both crew and passengers. The voyage was late in the sailing season, after the Day of Atonement (which is usually in early October) and the winds were adverse. Following the usual route along the south shore of Crete, Paul's ship was blown off course and wrecked on the island of Malta. He spent the winter on Malta, then proceeded onward to Puteoli and Rome.

=== Ship owners ===
The ships involved in the grain trade were privately owned. The Roman Imperial government provided subsidies and tax exclusions to encourage shipbuilding for the grain trade and took the risk of shipping on itself by providing a form of insurance to ship owners who delivered grain all year round, including the winter, when the risks of shipwreck were highest. In the early Empire, especially under Claudius, ship owners and the grain trade came increasingly under Imperial control, identified with the emperor in person. (Note: Claudius had personal experience of mob reactions to grain shortages, having been subjected to personal abuse during a bread riot) He offered a range of privileges, including grants of citizenship and exemption from import and harbour duties, to ship-owners willing to contract vessels of at least 10,000 modi into the grain trade.

== Milling and baking ==
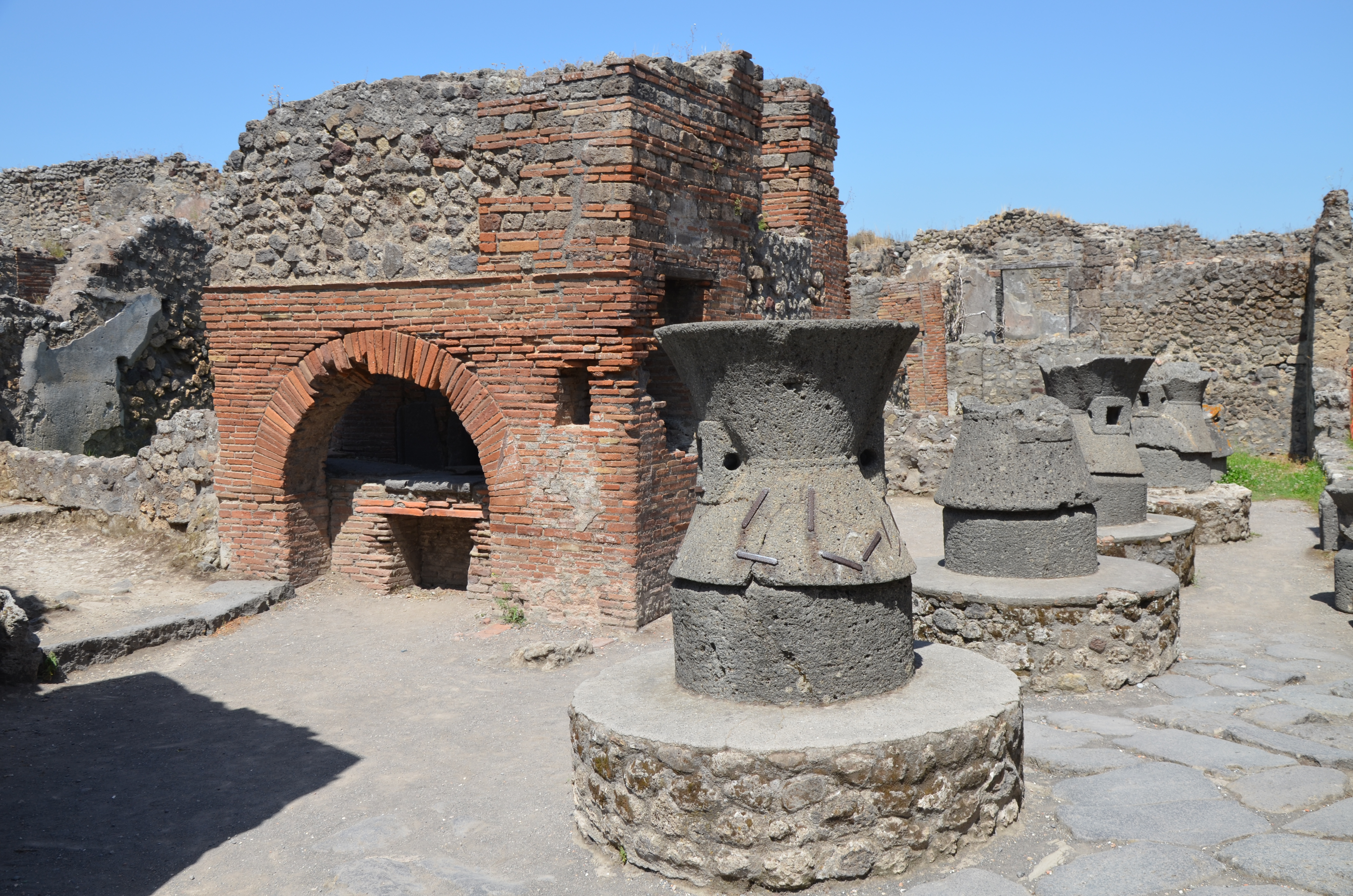
A mill and bakery complex at Pompeii

In the later centuries of the Roman Republic, the majority of those receiving a grain dole had it ground and baked at one of Rome's many small flour mills-cum-bakeries or cookhouses. These were found in every district of the city; most Romans lived in apartment blocks where the fire-risk was high, and cooking fires were forbidden by their landlords. Only the better off could grind their grain and bake their bread at home. Small hand-operated mills (querns) had been used to grind grain since Neolithic times. More efficient hand-driven rotary "hopper mills" were developed in 5th century BC Greece, and presumably spread to Rome shortly. Most had a small, usually domestic capacity. Much larger, more efficient rotary mills, powered by slaves, donkeys or horses, were funded and operated as business ventures. Those found at Ostia Antica and Rome are assumed to be typical of the Empire at large.

By the 170s BC at the very latest, and probably for centuries before, professional bakeries were operating in the city of Rome. By 150 BC, bakers were organising themselves into trading associations and guilds. Both slave and free labour was employed to knead dough, supervise animal-driven kneading machines, and fuel and fire the ovens; the cost of bread included the cost of harvesting, transporting and preparing the very large quantities of wood-fuel used to bring the oven to temperature and keep it there; huge "beehive" ovens of 3 to 5 meters diameter were used in commercial baking, baking the bread in just a few minutes. Bread production was increasingly mechanised. Water-driven mills were first utilized in the 1st century BC. Their development required a large investment in infrastructure, especially of aqueducts.

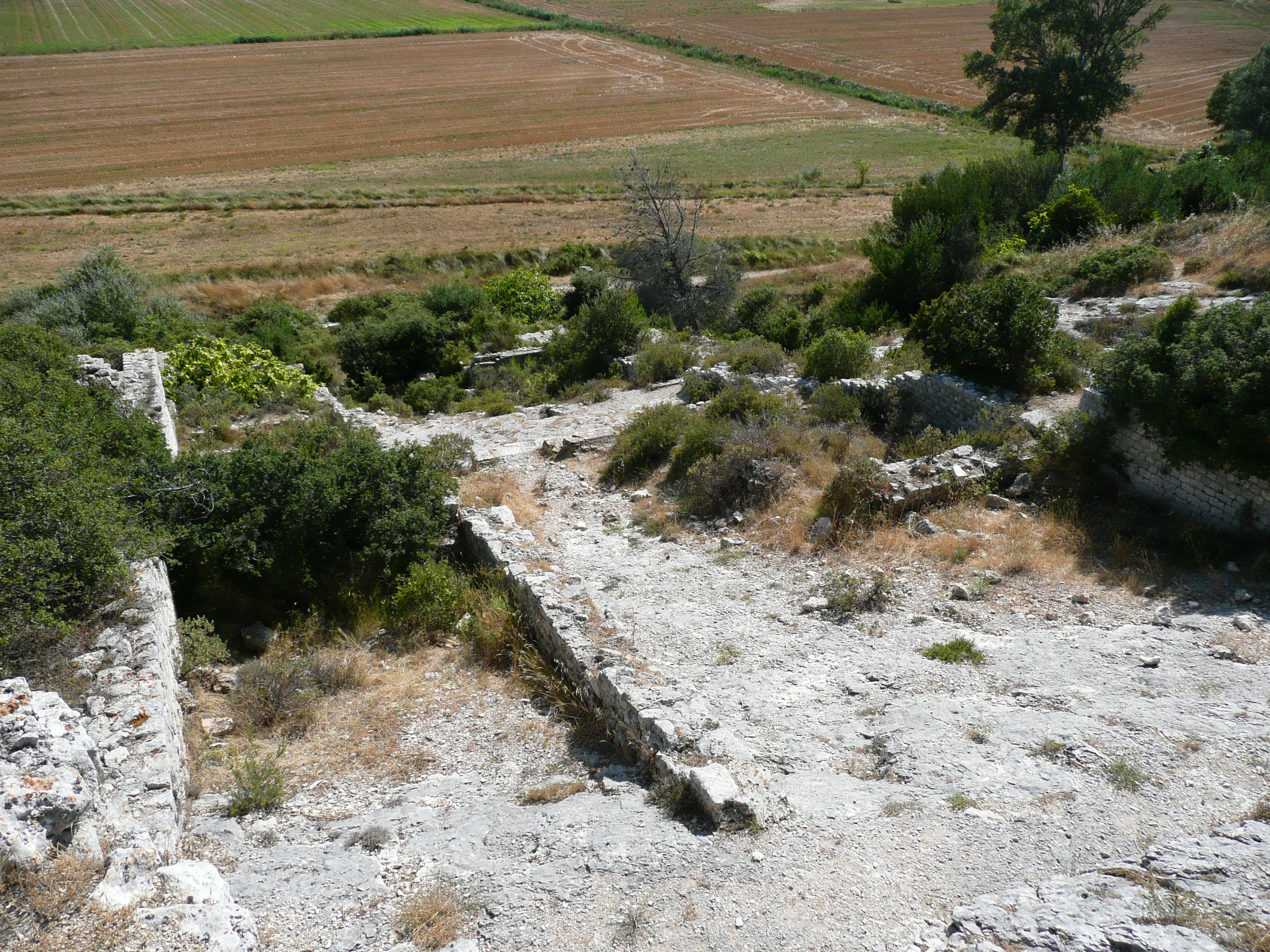
The sixteen overshot wheels at Barbegal are considered the biggest ancient mill complex. Their capacity was sufficient to feed the whole nearby city of Arles.

The Aqua Traiana, inaugurated in 109, brought water some 40 kilometres (25 mi) to the Janiculum Hill from springs near Lake Bracciano. Its water not only turned the mills but was clean enough for drinking. By the late 2nd or early 3rd centuries, most of the grain consumed in the city of Rome was ground using water-power. A famine caused by corrupt grain distributors, and resultant riots in 190 AD, persuaded the government under Emperor Septimius Severus to convert the distribution of grain to a distribution of flour. The Janiculum's watermills "were intended to centralize, regularize, and perhaps even deprivatize the city's milling operations."

The recipients of subsidised bread paid the baker a small fee for milling and baking; the grain itself was still free. The change from a grain supply to a flour supply would have carried with it a host of problems, some of which can only be guessed at. Flour is much more perishable than grain, and it would therefore have required more frequent distribution. The Emperor Aurelian (270–275 AD) is usually credited with changing or completing the change from doles of grain or flour to bread, and for adding olive oil, salt, and pork to the products regularly distributed; these products had been distributed sporadically before that. Aurelian is also credited with increasing the weight of loaves but not their price, a measure that was undoubtedly popular with the Romans who were not receiving free bread and other products through the dole. In the 4th century AD, Rome had 290 granaries and warehouses and 254 bakeries, regulated and monitored by the state and given privileges to ensure their cooperation.

== Politics and officials ==
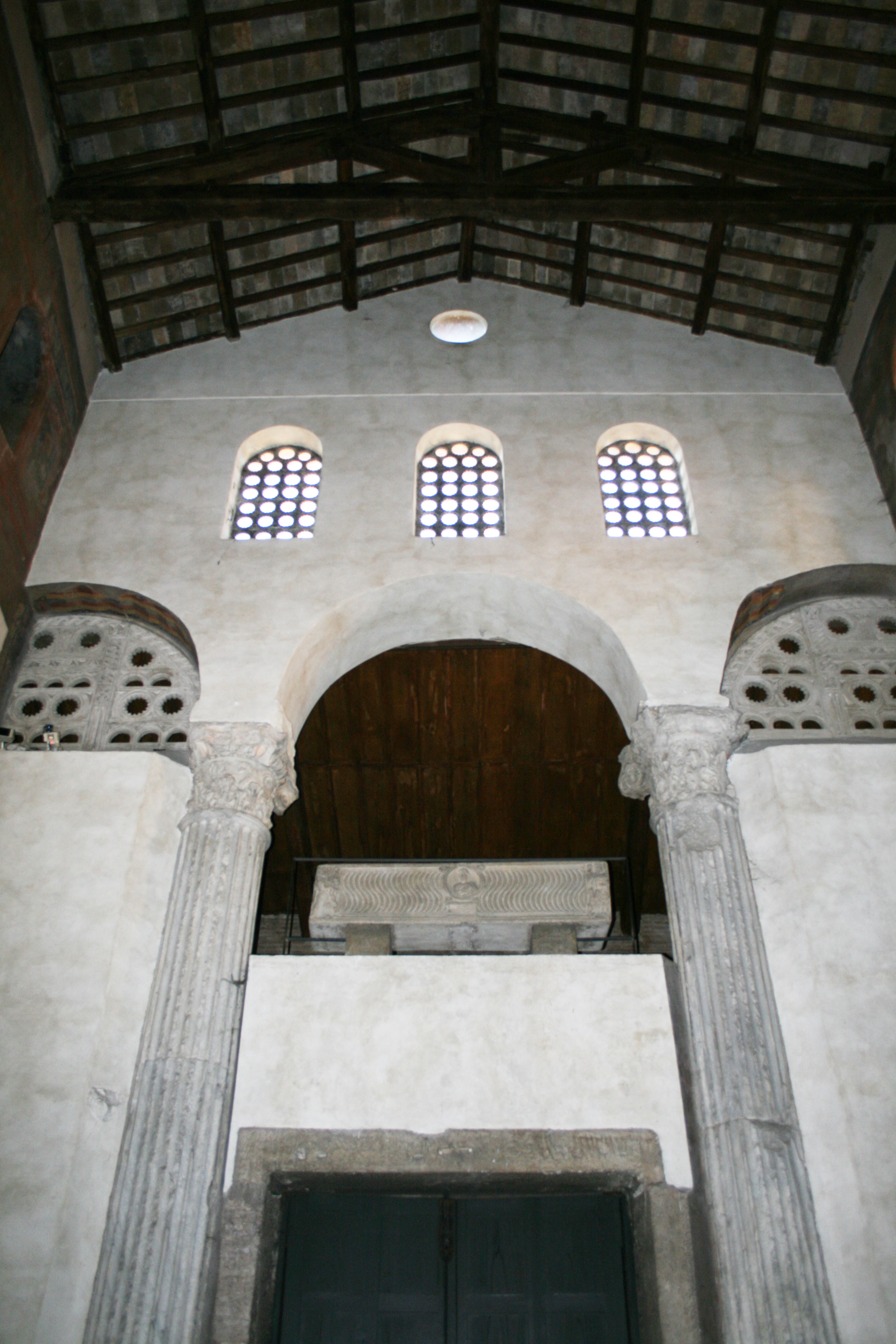
The columns of the statio annonae are now part of the church of Santa Maria in Cosmedin, Rome. Another statio was found near the Crypta Balbi.

In the early Republican era, the acquisition of grain in emergencies was a task of the consuls on behalf of the Senate, and was fulfilled on several occasions in time to avert grain famine. In an apocryphal episode of Livy's history of Rome, cheap corn was distributed in 439 BC by an ordinary but wealthy corn merchant named Spurius Maelius. The Senate interpreted this as a bid for kingship, and put him to death for it. Livy describes the "extraordinary appointment of a grain commissioner" in 440 BC, whose duties were to secure grain from abroad, and whom he describes as a praefectus annonae, but the title, function and office were only formalised much later, under Augustus. From the early 300s BC, executive responsibility for these duties passed to the aediles.

The annona was personified as a goddess, and the grain dole for the city of Rome was distributed from the aedile's headquarters at or near the Temple of Ceres. In the late republic, Pompey was granted an emergency cura annonae, which proved an important source of influence and power in his dealings with Mediterranean pirates and his subsequent career; some modern scholarship suggests that Cicero's speeches to the Senate on Pompey's behalf considerably exaggerated the threat of piracy to Rome's grain supply.

Issues of land ownership, land distribution, debt, and the grain supply were essential elements in the popularist politics of the late Republic. The consolidation of Roman agricultural lands in the hands of a wealthy few had pushed landless Romans into the city, where they found poverty rather than employment. The aristocratic Gracchi brothers opposed the dominance of the senatorial landed aristocracy in a series of confrontations, culminating in the temporarily successful passage of a radical program of land reform, the Lex Agraria Sempronia. The senate and their supporters resisted reform with extreme violence, which included the murder of the Gracchi brothers and their supporters. At some point soon after, the Sempronian law was cancelled or replaced by a more conservative Lex Octavia.

In the last years of the Republic, political conservatives and demagogues alike sought popular support against their political opponents by negotiating well-publicised state donations of grain. Cicero and Clodius are two notorious examples. Cicero gave free grain to the poor during a famine in Sicilly, and was celebrated for it; he was not opposed to grain subsidies and grain donations to save lives or bring down prices during times of need, but he believed that regular free grain issues could only encourage dependence and idleness at state expense. His "gift" actually reduced the number entitled to free grain. Clodius' grain law increased the number of beneficiaries to include every male citizen, approximately 320,000, regardless of status or wealth. This proved an unsustainable extravagance.

The system was vulnerable at any point in the chain of supply, whether through mere gossip, or accurate, dishonest or ill-informed reports by competitors, merchants or agents. News of slave revolts in Sicily pushed the price of grain to unaffordable levels in Rome. Lowering grain prices became an important agenda for the radical popularist Saturninus, who was voted to the office of plebeian tribune an unusual three times, before his murder by political enemies.

Juvenal (60–140 AD) refers to Rome's Imperial provision of subsidised entertainments and subsidised or free bread to the masses as panem et circenses (bread and circuses). In much modern literature this represents the Annona as a "briberous and corrupting attempt of the Roman emperors to cover up the fact that they were selfish and incompetent tyrants." Augustus disapproved even the idea of a grain dole, on moral grounds, but he, and every emperor after him, took the responsibility and credit for ensuring the supply to citizens who qualified for it.

The Emperor Tiberius created the locally elected priestly office of Augustalis to serve the cult of the deceased and deified Augustus; many Augustales were professionals in the grain logistics industry. The Emperor Nerva introduced a food-and-upkeep allowance (Alimenta) to benefit Italian children and orphans, and the Emperor Trajan may have introduced the post of curator alimentorum to administer it, a post much sought by members of the senatorial elite prior their consulship. The last known holder of the post, Titus Flavius Postumius Quietus, was city prefect in 271. (Note: Southern names the last known curator alimentorum as Postumius Varus, possibly in error.) The alimenta may have been ended by the Emperor Aurelian, possibly in order to increase its scope – he is known to have been a zealous, benevolent reformist.

The operation of the annona civilis became more complex over time. The role of the state in distributing the annona remained a central feature of its unity and power: "the cessation of this state function in the fifth century was a major factor leading to economic fragmentation, as was the end of the grain requisition for the city of Rome".

== End ==
The population of the city of Rome peaked at possibly more than 1,000,000 people from the late 1st century to the 3rd century AD. It declined to 700,000–800,000 by 400: and to 400,000–500,000 by 452. O'Donnell estimates the population at 100,000 in 500, declining still further in the Middle Ages. Twine (1992) estimates it at 30,000 in the 5th-6th century. A reduced population and smaller army could be supported, more or less, by local farms. The many watermills, storehouses, bakeries, and port and transportation facilities associated with the annona were no longer needed. In the early 6th century, Cassiodorus wrote that the "vast numbers of the Roman people in old time are evidenced by the extensive Provinces from which their food supply was drawn...and the enormous multitude of mills, which could only have been made for use, not for ornament."

The Vandals took control of Rome's north African provinces for around a century, starting c. 439, thus sequestering the greater source of the Western Empire's grain supply. They were reconquered in 533–34 by Justinian's forces, but their grain exports were probably diverted for the benefit of the Eastern Roman Empire. The Western cura annonae may have lasted into the 6th century; there is no evidence for its official termination, nor for its continuation. The Ostrogothic king Theodoric the Great visited Rome in 500 and promised food to its inhabitants. In 537, the Byzantine General Belisarius and his army withstood a siege of Rome by the Ostrogoths, who blocked the aqueduct that drove the city's watermills. Belisarius replaced the loss with ship mills, set up on the River Tiber.

Constantinople's grain supply was greatly reduced by the loss of Egypt, first temporarily to the Sasanian Empire during the Byzantine–Sasanian War of 602–628, and then permanently to the Rashidun Caliphate in the Muslim conquest of Egypt and much of the Levant. The Emperor Heraclius (r. 610–641) was forced to end subsidies of imported Egyptian grain after the capture of Alexandria, Egypt's major port, by "King of kings" (shahanshah) Khosrow II in 621.

== See also ==
- Aliment – Concept in civil systems
- History of agriculture
- Agriculture in ancient Rome
- Guaranteed minimum income – Social-welfare system
- Universal Basic Income – Unconditional social welfare proposal
