= Florianus =

Roman emperor in 276

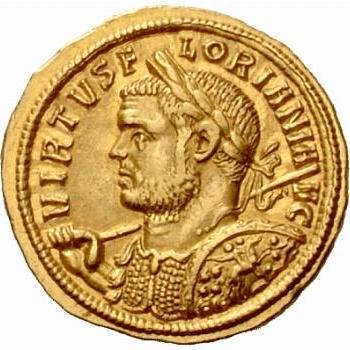
- Aureus of Florian, Ticinum mint

Roman emperor
- Reign: c. June–September 276
- Predecessor: Tacitus
- Successor: Probus
- Died: c. September 276; Tarsus, Cilicia
Names
- Marcus Annius Florianus
Regnal name
- Imperator Caesar Marcus Annius Florianus Augustus

Marcus Annius Florianus (died 276), also known as Florian, was briefly Roman emperor in the year 276. He took the throne after the death of his half-brother Tacitus, but was killed after 88 days by his own troops during his confrontation with the rival emperor Probus, who took over the Eastern provinces after Tacitus' death.

== History ==
In late 275, Florianus' maternal half-brother, Tacitus, was proclaimed emperor after the unexpected death of Aurelian. Soon after, Tacitus appointed Florianus as praetorian prefect. Tacitus then ordered Florianus to lead troops to Pannonia, in order to repel raids into Roman territory by the Goths. Tacitus died suddenly around June 276, allegedly as a consequence of a military plot, and Florianus swiftly proclaimed himself emperor, and was recognized as such by the Roman Senate and the western provinces. Florianus then continued to campaign against the Goths, winning a major victory before the news reached him of the revolt of Probus, who had served successfully as a commander under both Aurelian and Tacitus. Probus' revolt was supported by the provinces of Egypt, Syria, Palestine, and Phoenicia.

Probus took advantage of his control of Egyptian grain, which he used to swiftly cut off the supply of grain to the rest of the empire. He led his troops to Asia Minor, in order to defend the Cilician Gates, allowing him to utilize guerrilla tactics to wage a war of attrition rather than a straightforward confrontation. Florianus led his troops to Cilicia, and billeted his forces in Tarsus. However, many of his troops, who were unaccustomed to the hot climate of the area, fell ill due to a summer heat wave. Upon learning of this, Probus launched raids around the city, in order to weaken the morale of Florianus' forces. This strategy was successful, and Florianus lost control of his army, which rose up against him and killed him. Florianus' reign lasted less than three months, 88 days to be precise.

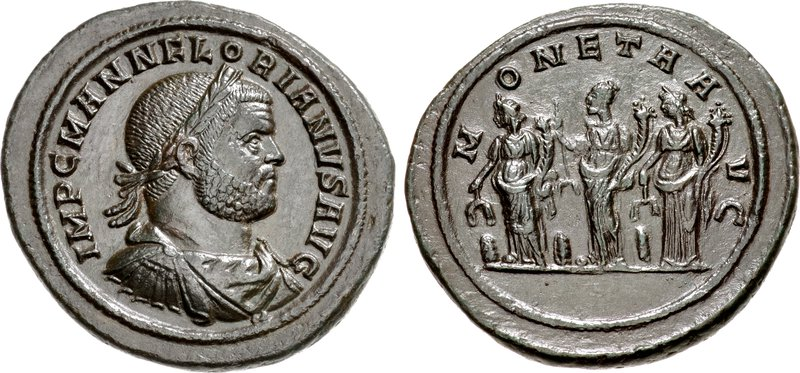
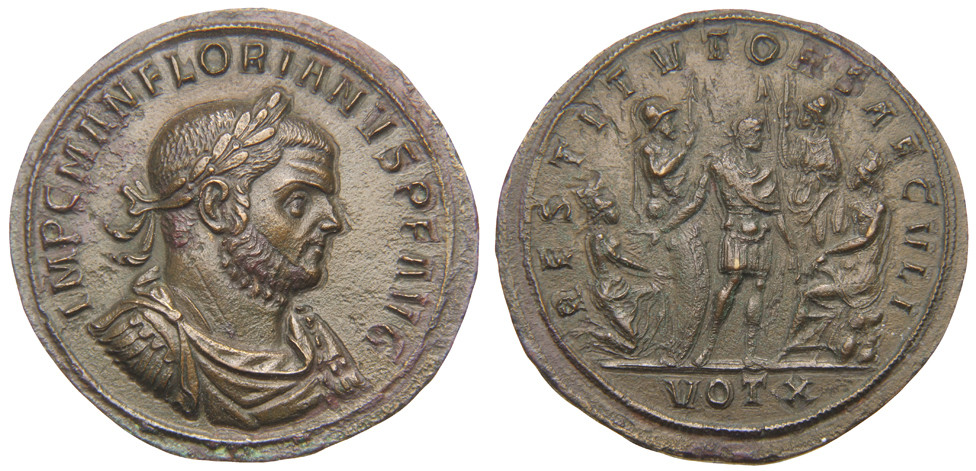
Two medallions of Florian

== See also ==
- List of Roman emperors

Regnal titles
Preceded by Tacitus	Roman emperor 276	Succeeded by Probus
