= Tacitus (emperor) =

Roman emperor from 275 to 276

- Gothicus Maximus
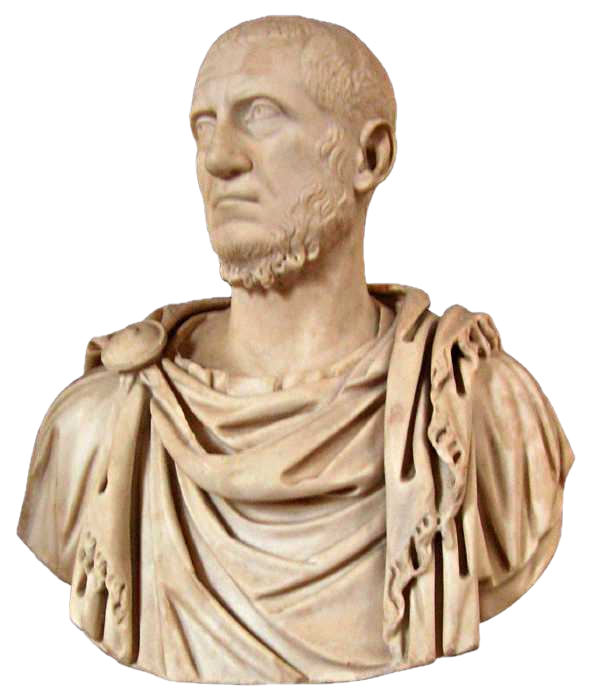
- Bust in the Louvre

Roman emperor
- Reign: c. December 275 – c. June 276
- Predecessor: Aurelian
- Successor: Florianus
- Died: June 276; Antoniana Colonia Tyana, Cappadocia
Names
- Marcus Claudius Tacitus
Regnal name
- Imperator Caesar Marcus Claudius Tacitus Augustus

Marcus Claudius Tacitus (/ˈtæsɪtəs/ TAS-it-əs; died June 276) was Roman emperor from 275 to 276. During his short reign he campaigned against the Goths and the Heruli, for which he received the title Gothicus Maximus.

== Early life ==
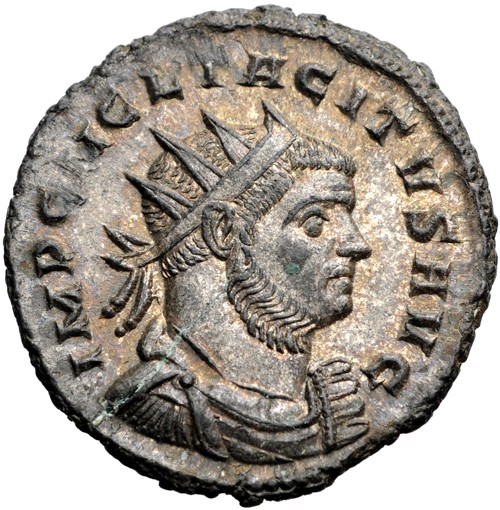
Antoninianus of Tacitus, reading "IMPerator Caesar Marcus CLavdius TACITVS AVGustus"

His early life is largely unknown. An origin story that circulated after his accession claimed Tacitus to be the heir of an old Umbrian family and one of the wealthiest men of the empire, having inherited and amassed 280 million sestertii. His faction distributed copies of the historian Publius Cornelius Tacitus's work, which was barely read at the time, perhaps contributing to its partial survival. Modern historiography rejects his alleged descent from the historian as a fabrication. It is more likely that he emerged from the Illyrian military, which made him a representative of the army in imperial politics.

In the course of his long life he held various civil offices, including the consulship twice, once under Valerian and again in 273, earning unequivocal respect.

== Emperor ==
After the assassination of Aurelian, the army, apparently showing remorse towards its role in the death of the beloved emperor, relinquished the right of choosing his successor to the Senate. After a few weeks, the throne was offered to the aged Princeps Senatus, Tacitus.

According to the Historia Augusta, Tacitus, after ascertaining the sincerity of the Senate's regard for him, accepted their nomination on 25 September 275, and the choice was cordially ratified by the army. If true, Tacitus would have been the last emperor elected by the Senate. However, it's possible that much of this narrative is fictitious, as Zosimus and Zonaras report that Tacitus was actually proclaimed by the army without any intervention of the Senate. His proclamation as emperor should have happened in late November or early December.

In older historiography, it was generally accepted that Aurelian's wife, Ulpia Severina, ruled in her own right before the election of Tacitus which could indicate an interregnum which lasted as long as six months. Contemporary bibliography considers that no interregnum may have existed between Aurelian's death and the accession of the new Emperor. Tacitus had been living in Campania before his election, and returned only reluctantly to the assembly of the Senate in Rome, where he was elected. He immediately asked the Senators to deify Aurelian, before arresting and executing Aurelian's murderers. In ancient sources, he was described as very old at that time, but in reality he was possibly in his fifties.

Amongst the highest concerns of the new reign was the restoration of the ancient Senatorial powers. He granted substantial prerogatives to the Senate, securing to them by law the appointment of the emperor, of the consuls, and the provincial governors, as well as supreme right of appeal from every court in the empire in its judicial function, and the direction of certain branches of the revenue in its long-abeyant administrative capacity. Probus respected these changes, but after the reforms of Diocletian in the succeeding decades not a vestige would be left of them.

=== Fighting barbarians ===
Next he moved against the barbarian mercenaries that had been gathered by Aurelian to supplement Roman forces for his Eastern campaign.

=== Death ===
On his way back to the west to deal with a Frankish and Alamannic invasion of Gaul, according to Aurelius Victor, Eutropius and the Historia Augusta, Tacitus died of fever at Tyana in Cappadocia around June 276, after a rule of just over 6 months. In a contrary account, Zosimus claims that Tacitus was assassinated after he appointed one of his relatives, Maximinus, to an important position in Coele Syria.

== Sources ==
=== Ancient sources ===
- Historia Augusta, Vita Taciti, English translation
- Eutropius, Breviarium ab urbe condita, ix. 16, English translation
- Aurelius Victor, "Epitome de Caesaribus", English translation
- Zosimus, "Historia Nova", English translation
- Joannes Zonaras, Compendium of History extract: Zonaras: Alexander Severus to Diocletian: 222–284

=== Secondary sources ===
- McMahon, Robin, "Tacitus (275–276 A.D)", De Imperatoribus Romanis
- Jones, A.H.M.; J.R. Martindale & J. Morris (1971). The Prosopography of the Later Roman Empire Volume 1: A.D. 260–395. Cambridge University Press. ISBN 0-521-07233-6.
- Leadbetter, Bill (2010). Galerius and the Will of Diocletian. London: Routledge. ISBN 978-0-415-40488-4.
- Hagi, David, ed. (2016). Coinage and History of the Roman Empire. Routledge. ISBN 978-1135971250.
- Southern, Pat. The Roman Empire from Severus to Constantine, Routledge, 2001 ISBN 978-0415239448.
- Gibbon, Edward Decline and Fall of the Roman Empire (1888)
- Chisholm, Hugh, ed. (1911). "Tacitus, Marcus Claudius" . Encyclopædia Britannica (11th ed.). Cambridge University Press.

Regnal titles
Preceded by Aurelian	Roman emperor 275–276	Succeeded by Florian
Political offices
Preceded by T. Flavius Postumius Quietus; Junius Veldumnianus	Roman consul 273 with Julius Placidianus	Succeeded by Aurelian; Capitolinus
Preceded by Aurelian; Marcellinus	Roman consul 276 with Aemilianus	Succeeded by Probus; Paulinus
