= Titus Flavius Postumius Quietus =

3rd century AD Roman senator and consul

(Titus Flavius) Postumius Quietus (fl. 3rd century AD) was a Roman senator who was appointed consul in AD 272.

== Biography ==
Postumius Quietus was a member of the third century gens Postumii, which was not descended from the Republican family of the same name. Possibly of Patrician status, he was one of the imperial candidates for the office of Quaestor, followed by his nomination for the office of Praetor tutelarius, responsible for matters pertaining to guardianships.

After this Postumius Quietus may have been the Legatus pro praetore in the province of Asia. This was followed by his posting as Curator rei publicae Aeclanensium item Ocriculanorum (or guardian of the towns of Aeclanum and Ocriculum). Next, he was appointed Curator viae [...] et alimentorum (or official responsible for maintaining some important Roman roads and ensuring Rome's food supply). He was the last known official who was responsible for the Alimenta, leading to speculation that the emperor Aurelian may have terminated the policy when he replaced the distribution of free grain to the citizens of the city with another form of dole.

Then in AD 272, Postumius Quietus was appointed consul prior alongside Junius Veldumnianus. His post consular career remains unknown, and he may have been a Christian. He was a near relative (perhaps the brother or cousin) of Titus Flavius Postumius Varus.

== Sources ==
- Martindale, John R.; Jones, A. H. M.; Morris, John, eds. (1971). The Prosopography of the Later Roman Empire: Volume I, AD 260–395. Cambridge: Cambridge University Press. ISBN 0-521-07233-6.
- Mennen, Inge, Power and Status in the Roman Empire, AD 193-284 (2011)

Political offices
Preceded by Lucius Domitius Aurelianus Augustus; Pomponius Bassus II	Consul of the Roman Empire; 272 with Junius Veldumnianus	Succeeded by Marcus Claudius Tacitus; Julius Placidianus
