= Battle of Autun =

Battle of Autun may refer to:

- Battle of Autun (532)
- Battle of Autun (640s)

== See also ==
- Siege of Autun (disambiguation)
