= Siege of Autun (1591) =

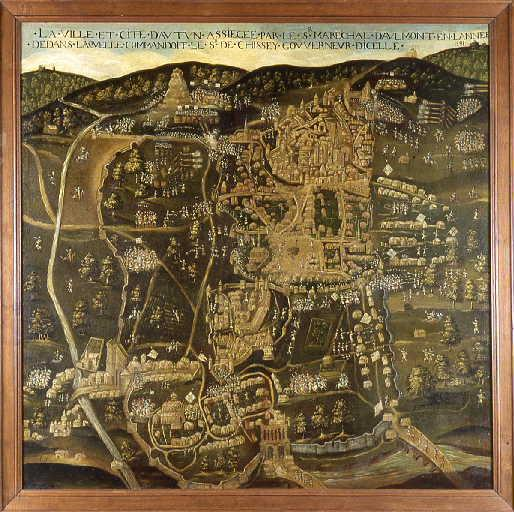
The Siege of Autun, oil painting, c. 1600, now in the Musée Rolin

During the French Wars of Religion, the siege of Autun lasted from 18 May until 20 June 1591. The city of Autun, held by the Catholic League, successfully resisted a Huguenot royal army under Marshal Jean VI d'Aumont.

Around 1600, the siege of Autun became the subject of an oil painting on a wood panel. It is based on an earlier print. The work is essentially a map of the siege. Its purpose was to memorialise and celebrate the siege as a victory for the Catholics.

== Works cited ==
- Abord, Hippolyte (1881). Histoire de la réforme et de la ligue dans la ville d'Autun. Vol. 2. Dumoulin.
- Ashley, Kathleen M. (2002). "Creating Family Identity in Books of Hours". Journal of Medieval and Early Modern Studies. 32 (1): 145–165.
- Gajewski, Alexandra (2019). "When Artists Drew Maps". The Burlington Magazine. 161 (1400): 946–950. JSTOR 10.2307/26997301.
- Serchuk, Camille (2025). Lies of the Land: Painted Maps in Late Medieval and Early Modern France. Penn State University Press.
- Trévisi, Marion (2019). "Femmes et guerres de siège en France à l'époque moderne: le choix des armes?". In Jean Baechler (ed.). Figures de la guerre. Hermann. pp. 101–114.
