= Julius Placidianus =

3rd century Roman general and Praetorian Prefect

Julius Placidianus (fl. 269–273) was a Roman general of the 3rd century. He was a professional soldier who advanced his career under Gallienus and survived into the age of Claudius II and Aurelian. Placidianus was consul in the year 273 as the posterior colleague of Marcus Claudius Tacitus, the future emperor. His life presented here is largely derived from L.L. Howe's history of the Praetorian Prefecture.

== Sources ==
There are two inscriptions relating to Placidianus, both from Gaul. The first dates from 269 in which he is Praefectus vigilum (i.e., Prefect of the Roman Watch), but commanding an army detachment against the Gallic Empire and based in southern Gaul and the second is datable to the early years of Aurelian's rule when he was acting as Praetorian Prefect.

== Origins ==
Placidianus' nomen, Julius, may indicate a Gallic origin as many Gallic families became Roman citizens under the patronage of the Julio-Claudian Emperors. However, in the two centuries since the death of the last of the Julio-Claudians, Nero, Julian clans could well have become much more widely dispersed geographically. His cognomen, Placidianus, is not sufficiently common to suggest any geographical focus for those choosing it. His date of birth is not known. Similarly, we have no record of him marrying or producing any heirs.

== Career ==
Placidianus is first encountered as Prefect of the Roman Watch - see Vigiles - under Claudius II in 269. As Claudius had been so closely associated with Gallienus it is likely that Placidianus too had been a rising star in that Emperor's entourage. He must, therefore, have been born with or had acquired equestrian status as Gallienus began the policy of excluding senators from high commands. Claudius apparently valued him sufficiently to use him in a very sensitive posting.

That he could be Prefect of the Watch while commanding an army detachment against the Gallic Empire (or, most improbably, the Goths) in southern Gaul supports the notion that high-flying army officers might be rewarded by appointments to offices in the Roman garrison while being given more substantive postings elsewhere in the Empire.

Whatever mandate Claudius gave Placidianus when he sent him to Gaul, it did not include taking direct action against the 'Gallic Empire', for it was during Placidianus's watch in the region that the 'Gallic Emperor' Victorinus took and sacked the city of Augustodunum (Autun) which had declared for Claudius without Placidianus making any move to relieve it. The most likely explanation for this is that at this time Claudius was fully engaged either in Italy against the Alamanni or in the Balkans against the Goths and was therefore unwilling to open a second theatre of operations in the western provinces, which would not only have involved a major military effort, but would also have required Claudius to assume responsibility for the defense of the Rhine frontier had he been successful.

Against this Placidianus is credited by Alaric Watson with suppressing a potentially dangerous revolt by Domitianus in the region south of Lake Geneva in 271. However, the most likely location for Domitianus's suppression was the Gallic capital, Augusta Treverorum (Trier), where Placidianus was unlikely to have been operating in 271 so perhaps even this success must be denied him.

Whatever the reason for Placidianus's failure to come to the rescue of Autun, he obviously made a sufficiently good impression for Claudius's successor, Aurelian, to appoint him his Praetorian Prefect at or soon after his accession. It is not known if he directly succeeded Aurelius Heraclianus, who had been Gallienus's last Praetorian Prefect and had probably colluded with Claudius and Aurelian in that Emperor's murder in 268. It is likely that Placidianus was still in Gaul when he was promoted. Howe thinks he remained Praetorian Prefect until Aurelian's death.

Nothing is known of Placidianus after the death of Aurelian in 275.

== Notes ==
Political offices
| Preceded by Titus Flavius Postumius Quietus; Junius Veldumnianus | Roman consul 273 with Marcus Claudius Tacitus | Succeeded by Aurelian; Capitolinus |
