= Alimenta =

Roman welfare program initiated by Nerva

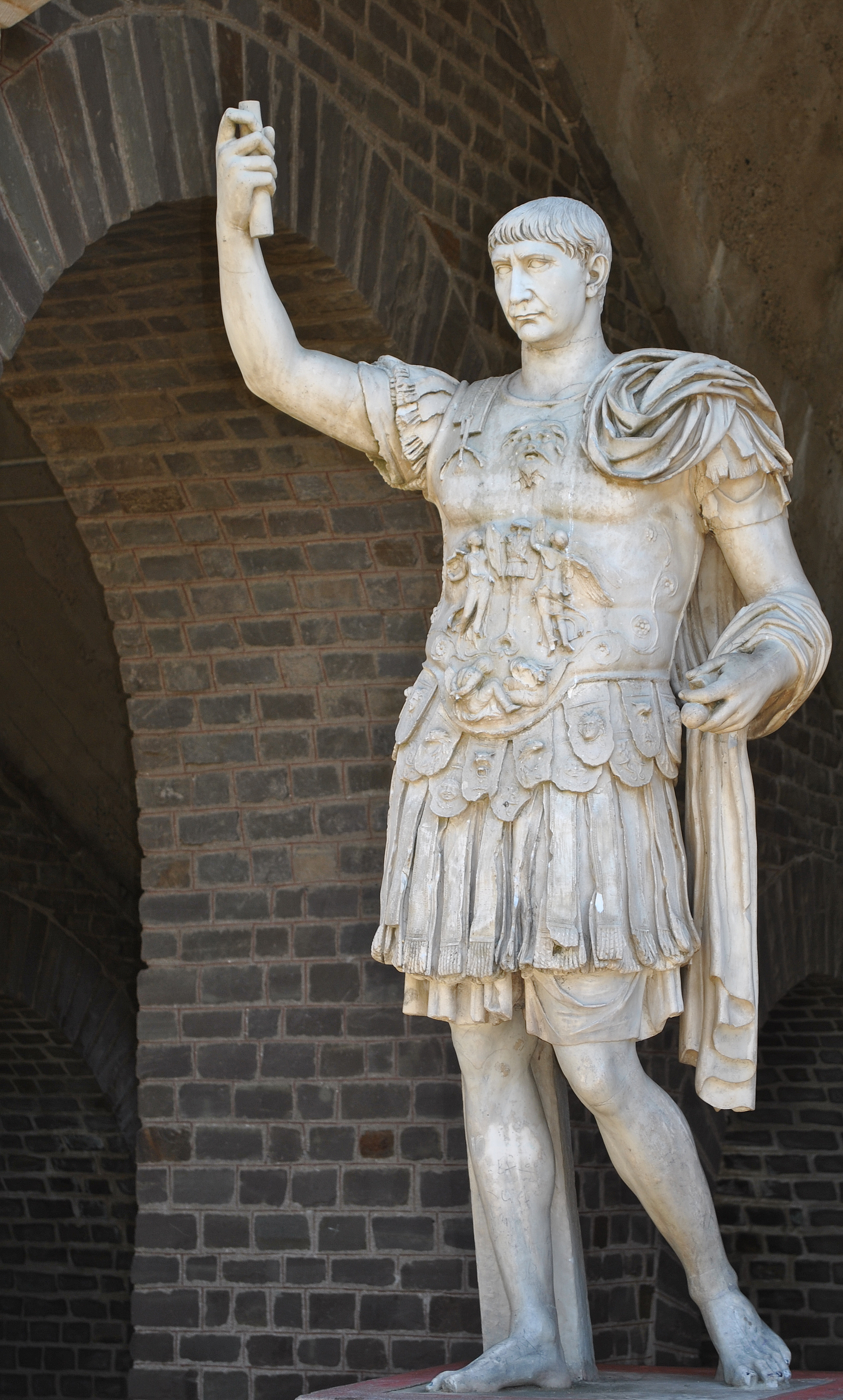
Statue of Trajan in front of the Amphitheater of Colonia Ulpia Traiana in the Xanten Archeology Park

The alimenta was a Roman welfare program that existed from around 98 AD to 272 AD. It was probably introduced by Nerva and was later expanded by Trajan. It was designed to subsidise orphans and poor children throughout Italy, but nowhere else, with a cash income, food and subsidized education. The program was an Imperial gift, supported during Trajan's reign by booty from his Dacian wars and estate taxes on landowners. Landowners who registered to contribute received a lump sum from the imperial treasury as a loan, and were expected to repay a given proportion annually, as their contribution to a charitable fund. The program was likely terminated by emperor Aurelian.

== Goals ==
Although the system is well documented in literary sources and contemporary epigraphy, its precise aims are disputed by modern scholars. Some assume that the program was intended to bolster citizen numbers in Italy, a continuation of Augustus' moral legislation (Lex Julia), which favoured procreation on moral grounds. This was openly acknowledged by Pliny. He wrote that the recipients of the alimenta were supposed to populate "the barracks and the tribes" as future soldiers and electors. In reality, both these roles were ill-fitted to an empire ruled as an autocracy, no longer centered exclusively on Rome or Italy, nor exclusively reliant on purely Roman or Italian civil and military manpower. The scheme's restriction to Italy suggests that it might have been conceived as a form of political privilege accorded to the original heartland of the empire. According to the French historian Paul Petit, the alimenta should be seen as part of a set of measures aimed towards the economic recovery of Italy. Finley thinks that the scheme's chief aim was the artificial bolstering of the political weight of Italy, as seen, for example, in the stricture — heartily praised by Pliny — laid down by Trajan that ordered all senators, even when from the provinces, to have at least a third of their landed estates in Italian territory, as it was "unseemly [...] that [they] should treat Rome and Italy not as their native land, but as a mere inn or lodging house".

== Scope ==
"Interesting and unique" as Finley finds the scheme, it remained small. It relied on regular interest repayments by landholders – mostly large ones, who were assumed to be more reliable debtors. It actually benefited very few potential recipients. Paul Veyne assumed that in the city of Veleia, only one child out of ten was an actual beneficiary. Reliance solely on loans to great landowners (in Veleia, only some 17 square kilometres were mortgaged) restricted funding sources even further. It seems that the mortgage scheme was simply a way of making local notables participate, albeit in a lesser role, in imperial benevolence. Moses I. Finley sees the alimenta as little more than a form of random charity, an additional imperial benevolence. It is possible that the scheme was, to some extent, a forced loan, something that tied unwilling landowners to the imperial treasury in order fund civic expenses. In this respect, the alimenta was not unusual, and may have been one of the more outstanding among similar and lesser fund-raising schemes. The senator Pliny had endowed his city of Comum a perpetual and heritable right to an annual levy (vectigal) of thirty thousand sestertii on one of his estates. Pliny probably hoped to engender enthusiasm among fellow landowners for such philanthropic ventures. Trajan did likewise, but since "willingness is a slippery commodity", Finley suspects that, in order to ensure Italian landowners' acceptance of the burden of borrowing from the alimenta fund, some "moral" pressure was exerted.

In short, the scheme was so limited in scope that it could not have fulfilled a coherent economic or demographic purpose — it was directed, not towards the poor, but to the community (in this case, the Italian cities) as a whole. The fact that the alimenta were expanded during and after the Dacian Wars and twice came on the heels of a distribution of money to the population of Rome (congiaria) following Dacian triumphs, points towards a purely charitable motive. The fact that the alimenta were restricted to Italy highlights the ideology behind it: to reaffirm the notion of the Roman Empire as an Italian overlordship. Given its limited scope, the plan was, nevertheless, very successful in that it lasted for a century and a half.

== End ==
Roman prefect Titus Flavius Postumius Quietus was the last known official in charge of the Alimenta in 271 AD, during the reign of Aurelian. Pat Southern believes that if Aurelian "did suppress this food distribution system, he most likely intended to put into effect a more radical reform". Indeed, around this time, Aurelian reformed the Cura Annonae to replace the dole of grain by a dole of bread, salt and pork, as well as subsidized prices for other goods such as oil and wine.

== Sources and Further Reading ==
- Elkins, Nathan T. (2017). The Image of Political Power in the Reign of Nerva, AD 96-98. Oxford: Oxford University Press. ISBN 978-0-19-064803-9.
- Finley, M.I. (1999). The Ancient Economy. Berkeley: University of California Press. ISBN 978-0-520-21946-5.
- Grainger, John D. (2003). Nerva and the Roman Succession Crisis of 96-99 AD. London: Routledge. ISBN 978-0-415-34958-1.
- Petit, Paul (1976). Pax Romana. Berkeley: University of California Press. ISBN 978-0-520-02171-6.
- Southern, Pat (2015). The Roman Empire from Severus to Constantine. London: Routledge. ISBN 978-0-415-73807-1.
- Veyne, Paul (1976). Le Pain et le Cirque (in French). Paris: Seuil. ISBN 978-2-02-004507-0.
