= Siege of Augustodunum Haeduorum =

Conflict between the Gallic and Roman Empires (269-270)

Date	269–270
Location	Augustodunum Haeduorum
Result	Victory for forces of Victorinus

Belligerents
Victorinus	Claudius Gothicus

Strength
Unknown	Unknown

Casualties and losses
Many	Many

The siege of Augustodunum Haeduorum took place in 269–270, Augustodunum (modern-day Autun in Burgundy, eastern France). Victorinus had been declared emperor by the troops located at Augusta Treverorum in the fall of 269. However, only the provinces of Gaul, Germania and Britain recognised him.

Hispania deserted the Gallic Empire and declared its loyalty to Claudius Gothicus. Claudius sent his general Placidianus to Gaul to take on Victorinus. Placidianus captured Cularo. This inspired the city of Augustodunum Haeduorum to abandon Victorinus and declare its intention to declare for Claudius Gothicus. This forced Victorinus to march south and besiege it.

Claudius did not send troops to the city, which fell after seven months. Victorinus’ troops plundered and destroyed the city. However Victorinus would be murdered shortly afterwards.
