= Lex Sempronia =

Ancient Roman law passed by members of the gens Sempronia

A lex Sempronia is a Roman law proposed by a member of the gens Sempronia. The most famous of these laws are those passed by the Gracchi brothers: especially the land reform law passed by Tiberius Sempronius Gracchus in 133 BC and the grain dole later passed by Tiberius' brother Gaius Sempronius Gracchus.

== Lex Sempronia agraria (133 BC) ==
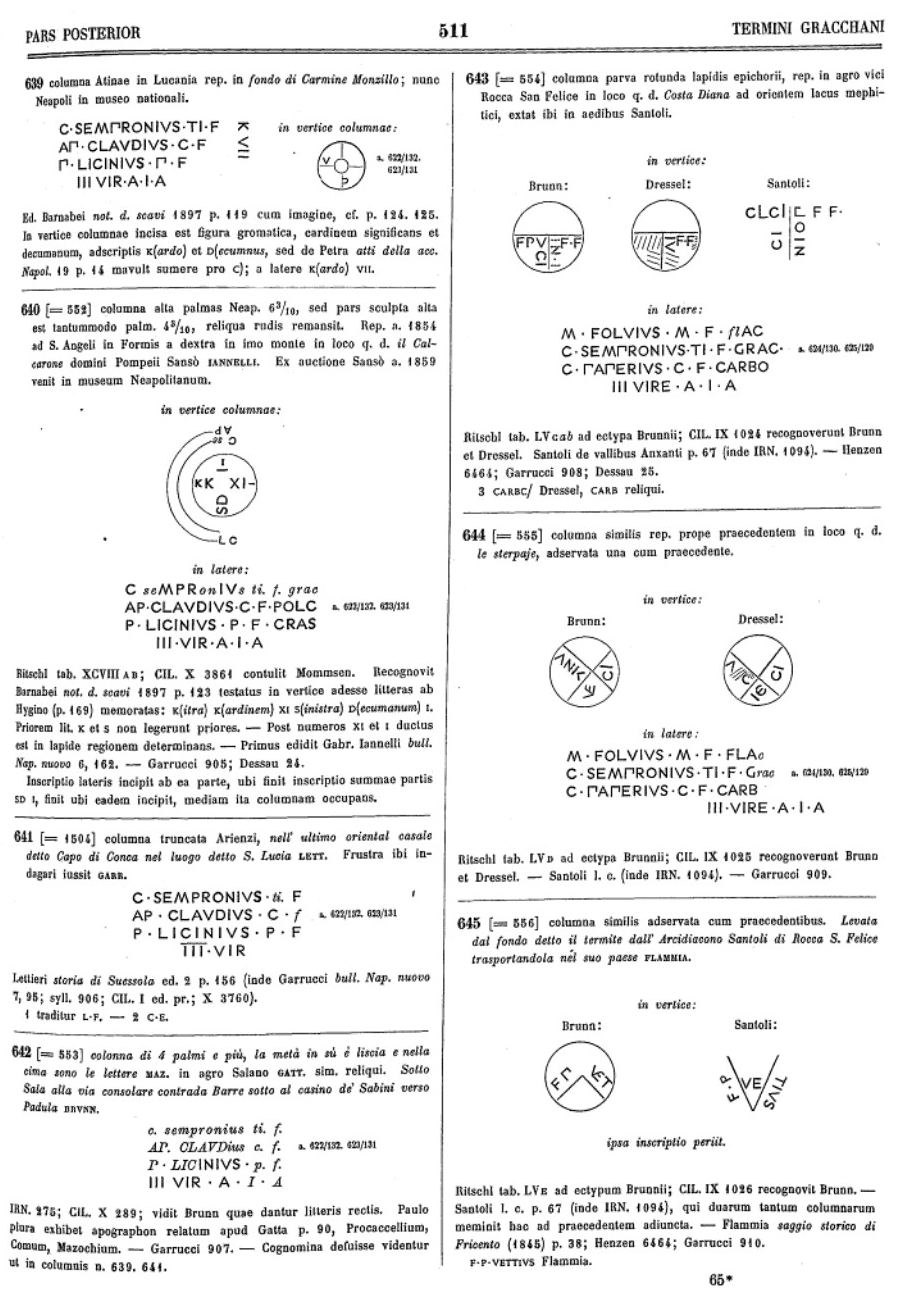
Diagrams, in the Corpus Inscriptionum Latinarum, of inscriptions left by the Gracchan land commission

Tiberius Gracchus proposed the Lex Sempronia agraria in 133 BC during his plebeian tribunate. The law provided for the creation of a three-man board to survey public lands and give them away in allotments with a nominal rent to poorer citizens. Scholars often suggest allotments of 30 jugera but the area was likely smaller. The purpose of the rent, called a vectigal, was to allow the state determine whether the land was abandoned and, if so, to redistribute it to another family. The land received also could not be alienated and was counted for the purposes of the property qualifications for military service. It had no impact on private land holdings and, contra Appian, did not distribute land to the Italian allies. The public lands to be distributed were to be found by revoking the usage rights of those who occupied more than 500 jugera of land (with the cap increased by 250 for each child until 1,000 jugera); in exchange, the remaining 500 jugera would be fully privatised under clear title into the hands of the current user.

The three-man board, titled triumviri agris iudicandis assignandis (three men for the assignment and surveying of agricultural land), was initially made up of Tiberius himself, his brother Gaius, and Appius Claudius Pulcher. After Tiberius' death at the hands of Publius Cornelius Scipio Nasica Corculum at the elections for the tribunate of 132 BC amid Tiberius' attempt to stand for a consecutive tribunate, his seat was filled by Publius Licinius Crassus. The authority of the triumvirs to survey land was severely restricted by a senatorial decree in 129 BC which found that the triumvirs' poor surveying practices were interfering in Rome's obligations to defend its allies' property rights; the authority to make judgements on land titles was consequently transferred to the consuls. The change hugely slowed the continued activities of the commission, as almost all the land not under dispute had already been distributed. Regardless, archaeological evidence implies that just between 133 and 129 BC the triumvirs distributed some 3,268 square kilometres of land (approximately 1.3 million jugera), concentrated in southern Italy and capable of supporting at least 15,000 households.

Gaius Gracchus, during his later tribunate, is recorded as having passed another land bill. This later bill, dating to 123 BC, likely re-enacted the earlier lex agraria while changing the type of lands that could be distributed and assigning the jurisdiction to settle land survey disputes with the triumvirs.

== Lex Sempronia de capite civis (123 BC) ==
A law de capite civis (on the life of the citizen), alternatively ne quis iudicio circumveniatur (to prevent circumvention of judicial process), was passed during Gaius Gracchus' first tribunate in 123 BC. Brought in response to the extralegal death of Tiberius nine years earlier and the following senatorial tribunal in 132 BC, it required magistrates to accept appeals to the people, provocatio, in capital cases and established procedures for prosecuting offenders. It had retrospective effect and Gaius prosecuted Publius Popillius Laenas, the consul of 132 BC who co-chaired the senatorial tribunal that exiled or executed perceived Tiberian conspirators, driving the former consul into exile.

== Lex Sempronia frumentaria (123 BC) ==
Gaius Gracchus passed this law during his plebeian tribunate in 123 BC establishing a subsidised grain supply at Rome where any male citizen, there were no eligibility requirements or means tests, could purchase some amount of grain at 6 1/3 asses per modius (approximately 1.5 imperial gallons volume). The costing was set at a rate slightly below that after the harvest. Costs for the grain subsidy programme were passed to the state treasury – to be paid for by taxes from provincial Asia and trade duties – with state granaries constructed to purchase grain when the cost was low and sell it throughout the year.

Grain subsidies were later expanded by Lucius Appuleius Saturninus in 100 BC. The programme was abolished during Sulla's dictatorship but revived by the consuls of 73 BC, Marcus Terentius Varro Lucullus and Gaius Cassius Longinus, reviving the original Gracchan scheme. Marcus Porcius Cato further expanded the grain dole during his tribunate in 62 BC before Publius Clodius Pulcher made the distribution entirely gratis during his tribunate in 58 BC.

== Lex Sempronia judicaria (123–22 BC) ==
Gaius Gracchus passed this law during his plebeian tribunates in 123 and 122 BC, shifting the jury pool for quaestio perpetua de repetundis (the permanent court on extortion) from the senators to the equites.

== Lex Sempronia de provinciis consularibus (123 BC) ==
Gaius Gracchus passed this law during his plebeian tribunate in 123 BC, requiring that prior to the consular elections, the senate would determine the consular provinces; tribunician vetos against such allocations were also disallowed. After their election, the consuls would then draw lots for or by mutual agreement decide on their provinces. A procedure was also provided for the reassignment of governors in the case of emergency. The purpose of the law was to reduce the ability of the sitting consuls to influence the assignment of their provinces in the senate.

It became common practice after the law came into effect for the senate to assign consuls as governors of territorial provinces – distinct from temporary provinciae (meaning "tasks") against some enemy as had been commonplace – close to expected theatres of conflict. This also had the effect of widening the perceived status between praetorian and consular provinces, with the former viewed as administrative garrison duty and the latter as for conquest. The ability for politicians to play around with the assignment of provinces was, however, rediscovered by having a plebeian tribune move legislation to assign the province by statute.

This law was superseded or repealed by the lex Pompeia in 52 BC. Brought pursuant to a senatorial decree the previous year, it required that provinces be assigned to ex-magistrates only after a five-year delay. After the passage of the lex Pompeia, the lex Sempronia's requirements no longer appear to be enforced – tribunes start to veto the assignment of governorships and there is no record that consular provinces are assigned prior to elections – suggesting that the lex Sempronia was repealed.

== Bibliography ==
- Broughton, Thomas Robert Shannon (1951). The magistrates of the Roman republic. Vol. 1. New York: American Philological Association.
- Carboni, Tiziana (2019). "Review of "A History of the Roman Equestrian Order"". Bryn Mawr Classical Review.
- Davenport, Caillan (2019). A history of the Roman equestrian order. Cambridge University Press. ISBN 978-1-107-03253-8.
- Drogula, Fred (2015). Commanders & command in the Roman republic and early empire. Chapel Hill: University of North Carolina Press. ISBN 978-1-4696-2314-6. OCLC 905949529.
- Lintott, Andrew (1994). "Political history, 146–95 BC". In Crook, John; et al. (eds.). The Cambridge ancient history. Vol. 9 (2nd ed.). Cambridge University Press. ISBN 0-521-85073-8. OCLC 121060.
- Roselaar, Saskia (2010). Public land in the Roman Republic. Oxford University Press. ISBN 978-0-19-957723-1.
