= Tetrarchy =

Roman system of power division among four rulers

Roman imperial dynasties
- The Tetrarchy
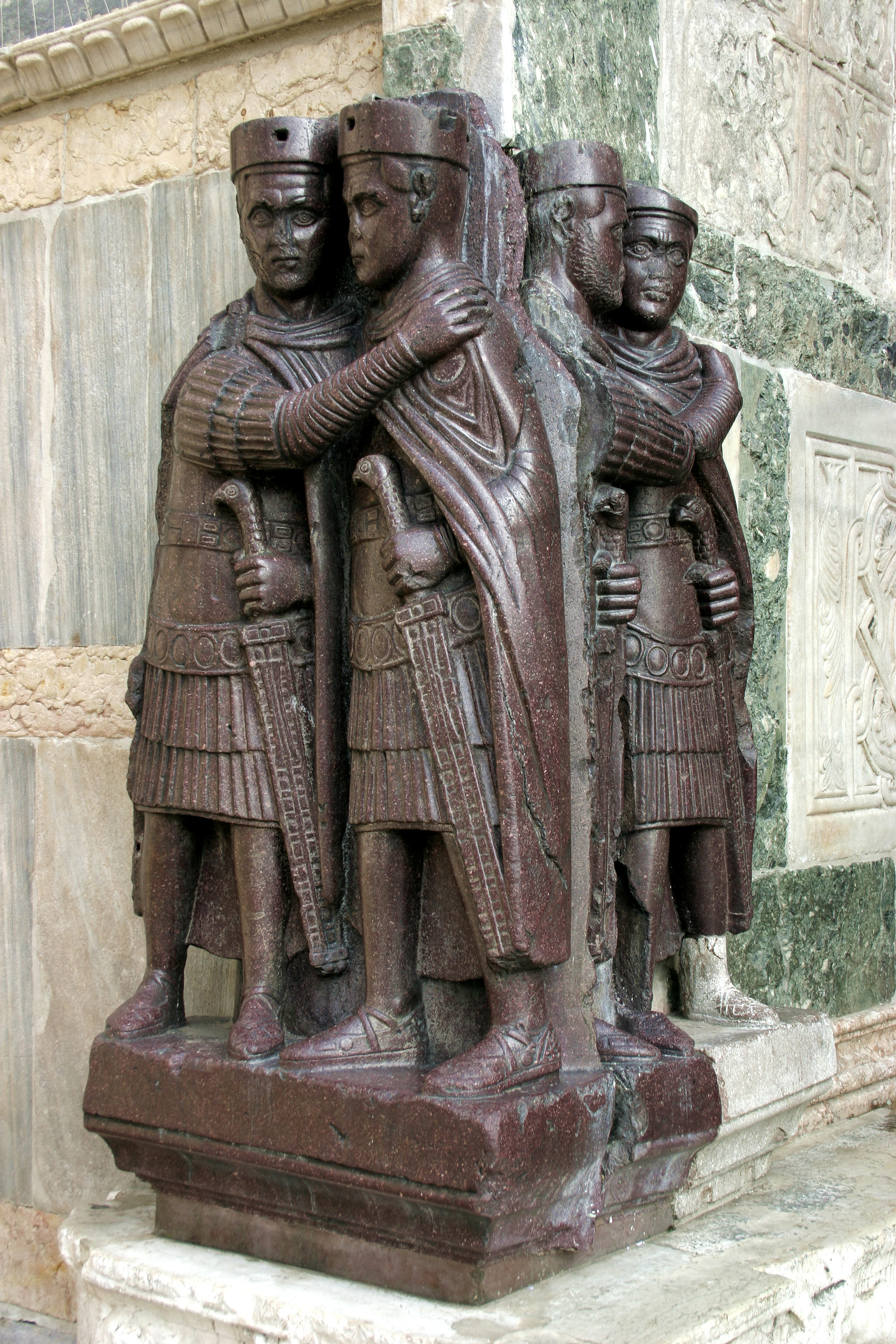
- Portrait of the Four Tetrarchs, two porphyry sculptures looted from the Philadelphion of Constantinople after 1204, now standing at the southwest corner of St Mark's Basilica, Venice

Chronology
Diocletian as Augustus	284–286
— with Maximian as Caesar	285–286
Maximian & Diocletian as Augusti of the West and East	286–305
— with Constantius I & Galerius as Caesares	293–305
Constantius I & Galerius as Augusti of West and East	305–306
— with Severus II & Maximinus II as Caesares
Severus II and Galerius as Augusti of West and East	306–307
— with Maximinus II and Constantine I as Caesares
Maxentius & Maximian as usurpers in Italy and Africa	306–308
Galerius as Augustus	307–308
— with Maximinus II as Caesar
— with Constantine I as self-proclaimed Augustus
Licinius & Galerius as Augusti of West and East	308–311
— with Maximinus II and Constantine I as Caesares
Maxentius as usurper in Rome (and Asia Minor 311–312)	308–312
Licinius I & Maximinus II as Augusti of West and East	311–313

The Tetrarchy was the system instituted by Roman emperor Diocletian to govern the ancient Roman Empire by dividing it between two emperors, the augusti, and their junior colleagues and designated successors, the caesares. It was kept in place between AD 293 and 324.

Initially Diocletian chose Maximian as his caesar in 285, raising him to co-augustus the following year; Maximian was to govern the western provinces and Diocletian would administer the eastern ones. The role of the augustus was likened to Jupiter, while his caesar was akin to Jupiter's son Hercules. Galerius and Constantius were appointed caesares in March 293. Diocletian and Maximian retired on 1 May 305, raising Galerius and Constantius to the rank of augustus. Their places as caesares were in turn taken by Valerius Severus and Maximinus Daza.

The orderly system of two senior and two junior rulers endured until Constantius died in July 306, and his son Constantine was unilaterally acclaimed augustus and caesar by his father's army. Maximian's son Maxentius contested Severus' title, styled himself princeps invictus, and was appointed caesar by his retired father in 306. Severus surrendered to Maximian and Maxentius in 307. Maxentius and Constantine were both recognized as augusti by Maximian that same year. Galerius appointed Licinius augustus for the west in 308 and elevated Maximinus Daza to augustus in 310.

Constantine's victory over Maxentius at the Battle of the Milvian Bridge in 312 left him in control of the western part of the empire, while Licinius was left in control of the east on the death of Maximinus Daza. Constantine and Licinius jointly recognized their sons – Crispus, Constantine II, and Licinius II – as caesares in March 317. Ultimately the tetrarchic system lasted until c. 324, when mutually destructive civil wars eliminated most of the claimants to power: Licinius resigned as augustus after losing the Battle of Chrysopolis, leaving Constantine in control of the entire empire.

The Constantinian dynasty's emperors retained some aspects of collegiate rule; Constantine appointed his son Constantius II as another caesar in 324, followed by Constans in 333 and his nephew Dalmatius in 335, and the three surviving sons of Constantine in 337 were declared joint augusti together, while the concept of the division of the empire under multiple joint emperors endured until the Fall of the Western Roman Empire. In the Eastern Roman Empire, augusti and caesares continued to be appointed sporadically.

== Terminology ==
The term tetrarchy (from the Greek: τετραρχία, tetrarchia, "leadership of four [people]") (Note: Historian David Potter translates the term as "gang of four". See idem., Constantine the Emperor (Oxford: Oxford University Press, 2013), 1.) describes any form of government where power is divided among four individuals.

Although the term "tetrarch" was current in antiquity, it was never applied to the imperial college (as it is often called) under Diocletian. Instead, the term described independent portions of a kingdom ruled by separate leaders. The tetrarchy of Judaea, established after the death of Herod the Great, is the most famous example of the antique tetrarchy. The term was understood in the Latin world as well, where Pliny the Elder glossed it as follows: "each is the equivalent of a kingdom, and also part of one" (regnorum instar singulae et in regna contribuuntur).

As used by the ancients, the term describes not only different governments, but also a different system of government from the Diocletianic arrangements. The Judaean tetrarchy was a set of four independent and distinct states, where each tetrarch ruled a quarter of a kingdom as they saw fit; the Diocletianic tetrarchy was a college led by a single supreme leader. When later authors described the period, this is what they emphasized: Ammianus had Constantius II admonish Gallus for disobedience by appealing to the example in submission set by Diocletian's lesser colleagues; his successor Julian compared the Diocletianic tetrarchs to a chorus surrounding a leader, speaking in unison under his command. Only Lactantius, a contemporary of Diocletian and a deep ideological opponent of the Diocletianic state, referred to the tetrarchs as a simple multiplicity of rulers.

Much modern scholarship was written without the term. Although Edward Gibbon pioneered the description of the Diocletianic government as a "New Empire", he never used the term "tetrarchy"; neither did Theodor Mommsen. It did not appear in the literature until used in 1887 by schoolmaster Hermann Schiller in a two-volume handbook on the Roman Empire (Geschichte der Römischen Kaiserzeit), to wit: "die diokletianische Tetrarchie". Even so, the term did not catch on in the literature until Otto Seeck used it in 1897.

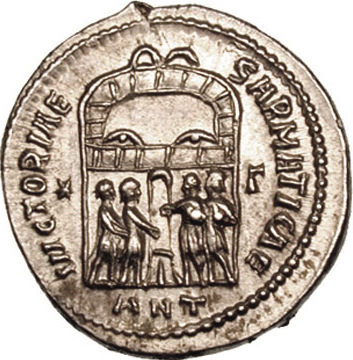
On the reverse of this argenteus struck in Antioch under Constantius I, the tetrarchs offer sacrifice to celebrate a victory against the Sarmatians.

== Creation ==
The first phase, sometimes referred to as the diarchy ("rule of two"), involved the designation of the general Maximian as co-emperor—firstly as caesar (heir apparent) in 285, followed by his promotion to augustus in 286. Diocletian took care of matters in the eastern regions of the empire while Maximian similarly took charge of the western regions. In 293, Diocletian thought that more focus was needed on both civic and military problems, so with Maximian's consent, he expanded the imperial college by appointing two caesares (one responsible to each augustus)—Galerius and Constantius I.

In 305, the senior emperors jointly abdicated and retired, allowing Constantius and Galerius to be elevated in rank to augustus. They in turn appointed two new caesares—Severus II in the west under Constantius, and Maximinus in the east under Galerius—thereby creating the second Tetrarchy.

== Regions and capitals ==
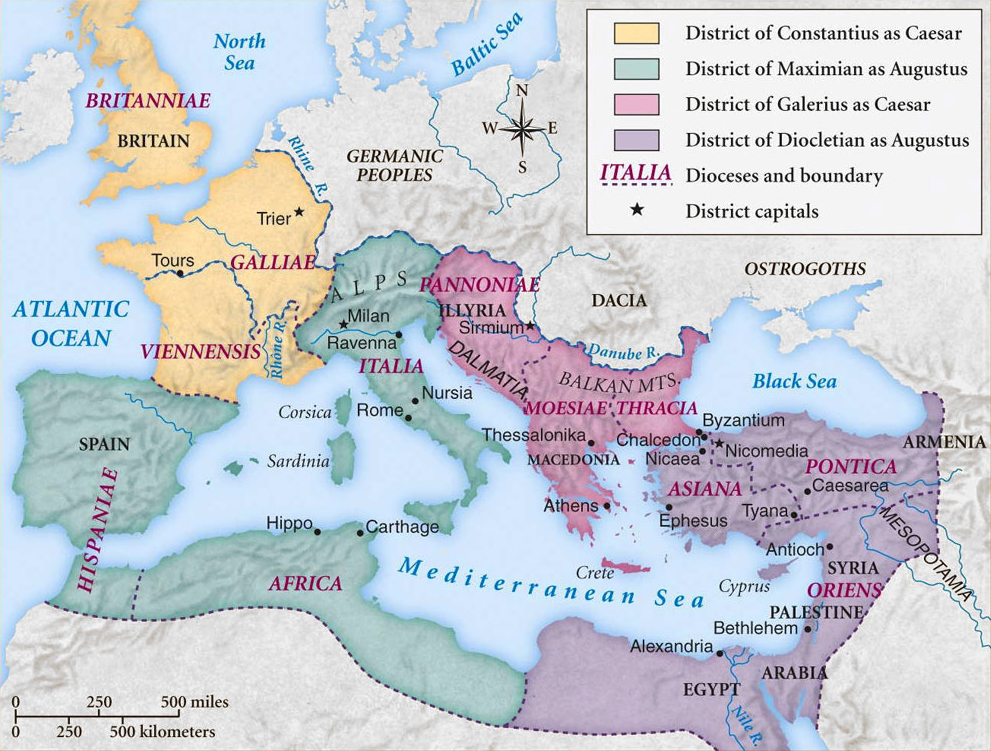
Map of the Empire under the Tetrarchy, showing the dioceses and the four tetrarchs' zones of influence.

The four tetrarchs based themselves not at Rome but in other cities closer to the frontiers, mainly intended as headquarters for the defence of the empire against bordering rivals (notably Sassanian Persia) and barbarians (mainly Germanic, and an unending sequence of nomadic or displaced tribes from the eastern steppes) at the Rhine and Danube. These centres are known as the tetrarchic capitals. Although Rome ceased to be an operational capital, Rome continued to be nominal capital of the entire Roman Empire, not reduced to the status of a province but under its own, unique Prefect of the city (praefectus urbi, later copied in Constantinople).

The four tetrarchic capitals were:

- Nicomedia in northwestern Asia Minor (modern İzmit in Turkey), a base for defence against invasion from the Balkans and Persia's Sassanids was the capital of Diocletian, the eastern (and most senior) augustus; in the final reorganisation by Constantine the Great, in 318, the equivalent of his domain, facing the most redoubtable foreign enemy, Sassanid Persia, became the praetorian prefecture Oriens, 'the East', the core of later Byzantium.
- Sirmium (modern Sremska Mitrovica in the Vojvodina region of modern Serbia, and near Belgrade, on the Danube border) was the capital of Galerius, the eastern caesar; this was to become the Balkans-Danube prefecture Illyricum.
- Mediolanum (modern Milan, near the Alps) was the capital of Maximian, the western augustus; his domain became "Italia et Africa", with only a short exterior border.
- Augusta Treverorum (modern Trier, in Germany) was the capital of Constantius, the western caesar, near the strategic Rhine border; it had been the capital of Gallic emperor Tetricus I. This quarter became the prefecture Galliae.

Aquileia, a port on the Adriatic coast, and Eboracum (modern York, in northern England near the Celtic tribes of modern Scotland and Ireland), were also significant centres for Maximian and Constantius respectively.

In terms of regional jurisdiction there was no precise division among the four tetrarchs, and this period did not see the Roman state actually split up into four distinct sub-empires. Each emperor had his zone of influence within the Roman Empire, but little more, mainly high command in a 'war theater'. Each tetrarch was himself often in the field, while delegating most of the administration to the hierarchic bureaucracy headed by his respective praetorian prefect, each supervising several vicarii, the governors-general in charge of another, lasting new administrative level, the civil diocese. For a listing of the provinces, now known as eparchy, within each quarter (known as a praetorian prefecture), see Roman province.

In the West, the augustus Maximian controlled the provinces west of the Adriatic Sea and the Syrtis, and within that region his caesar, Constantius, controlled Gaul and Britain. In the East, the arrangements between the augustus Diocletian and his caesar, Galerius, were much more flexible.

The Tetrarchs’ authority is recorded not only on coins and milestones but also on boundary stones from the Levant, which document local land surveys and village boundaries.

== Public image ==
Although power was shared in the tetrarchic system, the public image of the four members of the imperial college was carefully managed to give the appearance of a united empire (patrimonium indivisum). This was especially important after the numerous civil wars of the 3rd century.

The tetrarchs appeared identical in all official portraits. Coinage dating from the tetrarchic period depicts every emperor with identical features—only the inscriptions on the coins indicate which one of the four emperors is being shown. The Byzantine sculpture Portrait of the Four Tetrarchs shows the tetrarchs again with identical features and wearing the same military costume.

== Military successes ==
One of the greatest problems facing emperors in the Third Century Crisis was that they were only ever able to personally command troops on one front at any one time. While Aurelian and Probus were prepared to accompany their armies thousands of miles between war regions, this was not an ideal solution. Furthermore, it was risky for an emperor to delegate power in his absence to a subordinate general, who might win a victory and then be proclaimed as a rival emperor himself by his troops (which often happened). All members of the imperial college, on the other hand, were of essentially equal rank, despite two being senior emperors and two being junior; their functions and authorities were also equal.

Under the Tetrarchy a number of important military victories were secured. Both the dyarchic and the tetrarchic system ensured that an emperor was near to every crisis area to personally direct and remain in control of campaigns simultaneously on more than just one front. After suffering a defeat by the Persians in 296, Galerius crushed Narseh in 298—reversing a series of Roman defeats throughout the century—capturing members of the imperial household and a substantial amount of booty and gaining a highly favourable peace treaty, which secured peace between the two powers for a generation. Similarly, Constantius defeated the British usurper Allectus, Maximian pacified the Gauls, and Diocletian crushed the revolt of Domitianus in Egypt.

== Demise ==
When in 305 the 20-year term of Diocletian and Maximian ended, both abdicated. Their caesares, Galerius and Constantius Chlorus, were both raised to the rank of augustus, and two new caesares were appointed: Maximinus Daza (caesar to Galerius) and Valerius Severus (caesar to Constantius). These four formed the second tetrarchy.

However, the system broke down very quickly thereafter. When Constantius died in 306, Constantine, Constantius' son, was proclaimed augustus by his father's troops; however, Galerius instead chose to promote Severus to augustus while granting Constantine the position of caesar. At the same time, Maxentius, the son of Maximian, resented being left out of the new arrangements, so he rebelled against and defeated Severus before forcing him to abdicate and then arranging his murder in 307. Maxentius and Maximian both then declared themselves augusti. By 308 there were therefore no fewer than four claimants to the rank of augustus (Galerius, Constantine, Maximian and Maxentius), and only one to that of caesar (Maximinus Daza).

In 308 Galerius, together with the retired emperor Diocletian and the supposedly retired Maximian, called an imperial "conference" at Carnuntum on the River Danube. The council agreed that Licinius would become augustus in the West, with Constantine as his caesar. In the East, Galerius remained augustus and Maximinus remained his caesar. Maximian was to retire, and Maxentius was declared a usurper. This agreement proved disastrous: by 308 Maxentius had become de facto ruler of Italy and Africa even without any imperial status, and neither Constantine nor Maximinus—who had both been caesares since 306 and 305 respectively—were prepared to tolerate the promotion of the augustus Licinius as their superior.

After an abortive attempt to placate both Constantine and Maximinus with the meaningless title filius augusti ("son of the augustus", essentially an alternative title for caesar), they both had to be recognised as Augusti in 309. However, four full Augusti all at odds with each other did not bode well for the tetrarchic system.

Between 309 and 313 most of the claimants to the imperial office died or were killed in various civil wars. Constantine forced Maximian's suicide in 310. Galerius died naturally in 311. Maxentius was defeated by Constantine at the Battle of the Milvian Bridge in 312 and subsequently killed. Maximinus committed suicide at Tarsus in 313 after being defeated in battle by Licinius.

By 313, therefore, there remained only two rulers: Constantine in the West and Licinius in the East. The tetrarchic system was at an end, although it took until 324 for Constantine to finally defeat Licinius, reunite the two halves of the Roman Empire and declare himself sole augustus.

== Emperors ==
Portrait	Name	Reign	Co-ruler(s)	Ref
	Diocletian "Jovius"; Gaius Aurelius Valerius Diocletianus (Whole, then East)	20 November 284 – 1 May 305 (20 years, 5 months and 11 days)	Maximian (caesar, 21 July 285; co-augustus, 1 May 305) Galerius (caesar, 1 March 293) Constantius I (caesar, 1 March 293)	
	Maximian "Herculius"; Marcus Aurelius Valerius Diocletianus (West)	1 April 286 – 1 May 305 (19 years and 1 month; retired)pac 28 October 306 – 11 November 308 (2 years and 14 days)	Diocletian (augustus, 21 July 285; co-augustus, 1 May 305) Galerius (caesar, 21 March 293) Constantius I (caesar, 1 March 293) Maxentius (co-augustus, 306–308) Constantine I (rival augustus, 25 July 306; co-augustus, 307)	
	Galerius; Gaius Galerius Valerius Maximianus (East)	1 May 305– 5 May 311 (6 years and 4 days)	Diocletian (augustus, 21 March 293–1 May 305) Maximian (augustus, 21 March 293–1 May 305) Constantius I (caesar, 1 March 293; co-augustus, 1 May 305–25 July 306) Severus II (caesar, 1 May 305; co-augustus, August 306–April 307) Maxentius (caesar, 28 October 306; junior co-augustus, April 307–May 311) Licinius (designated augustus for the West, 11 November 308–311) Maximinus II (caesar, 1 May 305; co-augustus, 1 May 310–early May 311)	
	Constantius I "Chlorus"; Marcus Flavius Valerius Constantius (West)	1 May 305 – 25 July 306 (1 year, 2 months and 24 days)	Diocletian (augustus, 1 March 293–1 May 305) Maximian (augustus, 1 April 286–1 May 305) Galerius (caesar, 21 March 293; co-augustus, 1 May 305–25 July 306) Severus II (caesar, 1 May 305 –July 306) Maximinus II (caesar, 1 May 305–25 July 306)	
	Constantine I "the Great"; Flavius Valerius Constantinus (West)	25 July 306 – 18 September 324 (18 years, 1 month and 25 days; sole emperor 324–337)	Maximian (rival augustus, 306–307; co-augustus, 307–308) Maxentius (rival augustus, 306–307; co-augustus; 308) Licinius (rival augustus, 308–310; co-augustus, 310–316; rival, 316–324) Crispus (caesar, 1 March 317–324) Constantine II (caesar, 1 March 317–324) Martinian (rival augustus, 324)	
	Severus II; Flavius Valerius Severus (West)	25 July 306 – April 307 (8 months)	Galerius (augustus, 25 July 306–April 307) Maxentius (rival augustus, 28 October 306) Constantine I (rival augustus, 306–307) Maximinus II (caesar, 1 May 305–April 307)	
	Maxentius; Marcus Aurelius Valerius Maxentius (West)	28 October 306 – 28 October 312 (6 years)	Maximian (co-augustus, 306–308) Severus II (rival augustus, August 306–April 307) Licinius (rival-augustus, 11 November 308–28 October 312) Constantine I (rival augustus, 25 July 306–28 October 312)	
	Licinius; Valerius Licinianus Licinius (West, then East)	11 November 308 – 19 September 324 (15 years, 10 months and 8 days)	Constantine I (rival augustus, 308–310; co-augustus, 310–316; rival, 316–324) Valens I (designated Western augustus, October 316–February 317) Licinius II (caesar, 1 March 317–324) Crispus (caesar, 1 March 317–324) Constantine II (caesar, 1 March 317–324) Martinian (designated Western augustus, July–September 324)	
	Maximinus II "Daza"; Galerius Valerius Maximinus (East)	310 – c. July 313 (3 years)	Constantius I (augustus, 1 May 305–25 July 306) Galerius (augustus, 1 May 305–25 July 311) Severus II (caesar, 1 May 305; augustus 25 July 306) Maximian (augustus, late 306–November 308) Maxentius (rival augustus, 310–312) Constantine I (rival augustus, 310–313) Licinius (augustus, 308–313; rival augustus, 313–313)	

== Family tree ==
Simplified family tree of Tetrarchs

(See also: Chronological scheme of the Tetrarchy, 286–324)

DIOCLETIAN; Iovius; Eastern Emperor; 286–305	Prisca	Afranius Hannibalianus (disputed) (Note: Timothy Barnes (New Empire, 33–34) questions the parentage of Theodora shown here. He proposes that Maximian is her natural father (and that her mother is possibly a daughter of Afranius Hannibalianus). Substituting Afranicus Hannibalianus and switching the positions of Maximian and Eutropia would produce a diagram that matches the alternative lineage.) consul 292	Eutropia	Maximian; Herculius; Western Emperor; 286–305
Unknown sister	Galerius; Eastern Emperor; 305-311	Galeria Valeria	Helena	Constantius I Western Emperor; 305–306; Constantinian Dynasty	Flavia Maximiana Theodora	Severus II; Western Emperor; 306–307
Maximinus II; Eastern Emperor; 310–313	Valeria Maximilla	Maxentius; Western Emperor; 306–312	Fausta	Constantine I Roman Emperor; 306–337	Julius Constantius consul 335	Flavia Julia Constantia	Licinius I Western then Eastern Emperor; 308–324	Martinian; Eastern Emperor; 324	Valens I Eastern Emperor; 316–317
Valerius Romulus	Constantine II; Western Emperor; 337–340	Constantius II; Emperor; 337–361	Constans I Middle then Western Emperor; 337–350	Julian II; Emperor; 361–363	Licinius II caesar

Notes:

Bibliography:

- Barnes, Timothy D. The New Empire of Diocletian and Constantine. Cambridge, MA: Harvard University Press, 1982. ISBN 0-7837-2221-4

== Detailed timeline ==
Diarchy 1 April 286 – 1 March 293
Western Roman Empire	Eastern Roman Empire
Maximian Augustus	Diocletian Augustus
Usurpers
Carausius in Britain (286–293)	—

Two caesares are appointed in 293, thus starting the Tetrarchy.

First Tetrarchy 1 March 293 – 1 May 305
Western Roman Empire	Eastern Roman Empire
Maximian Augustus	Diocletian Augustus
Constantius Caesar	Galerius Caesar
Usurpers
Carausius in Britain (286–293)	Domitian III in Egypt (297)
Allectus in Britain (293–296)	Achilleus in Egypt (297–298)

After the retirement of the two augusti both previous caesares succeeded them, and two new caesares were appointed.

Second Tetrarchy 1 May 305 – 25 July 306
Western Roman Empire	Eastern Roman Empire
Constantius Augustus	Galerius Augustus
Severus Caesar	Maximinus Caesar

After the sudden death of Constantius Chlorus (who died of natural causes), the caesar Flavius Severus succeeded him as augustus. However, Constantius' troops immediately proclaimed Constantine, Constantius' son, as their new augustus. Galerius accepted Constantine as part of the imperial college, but only as caesar. On 28 October 306, Maximian's son Maxentius proclaimed himself emperor in Rome. Maximian also proclaimed himself emperor, ruling jointly with his son. Despite being accepted by the Roman Senate, they were not recognized by the other emperors.

Third Tetrarchy 25 July 306 – September 307
Western Roman Empire	Eastern Roman Empire
Severus Augustus	Galerius Augustus
Constantine Caesar (self-styled augustus)	Maximinus Caesar
Usurpers
Maxentius in Italy and Africa (from 28 October 306)	Maximian in Italy and Africa (from 28 October 306)

Severus was taken hostage by Maximian in April 307, but Galerius still acknowledged him as the official emperor of the west. Constantine was denied the promotion to augustus even after Severus' death in September, as Galerius had decided to exclude him from the system altogether. Maximian acknowledge Constantine's status as augustus, but this meant nothing given that he himself was declared an usurper. Galerius and Maximinus thus remained as the only "legitimate" members of the imperial college.

Galerius as sole Augustus September 307 – November 308
Western Roman Empire	Eastern Roman Empire
(vacant)	Galerius Augustus
(vacant)	Maximinus Caesar
Usurpers
Maxentius in Italy and Africa	Maximian in Italy and Africa
Constantine in Gaul and Hispania	

At the council of Carnutum, Diocletian decides that Licinius will be the new augustus of the west (although his western domains only consist of the Diocese of Pannonia). Constantine was given back the title of caesar, which he continued to unacknowledge.

Fourth Tetrarchy 11 November 308 – May 310
Western Roman Empire	Eastern Roman Empire
Licinius Augustus	Galerius Augustus
Constantine Caesar (self-styled augustus)	Maximinus Caesar
Usurpers
Maxentius in Italy	Domitius Alexander in Africa (308–310?)

Maximinus was proclaimed augustus by his troops in about May 310. Galerius reluctantly agreed to recognize both Maximinus and Constantine as augusti, thus breaking the Diocletian's tetrarchic system.

Tetrarchy of Augusti May 310 – May 311
Western Roman Empire	Eastern Roman Empire
Licinius Augustus	Galerius Augustus
Constantine Augustus	Maximinus Augustus
Usurpers
Maxentius; In Italy and Africa	Maximian; In Gaul, c. July 310

After the death of Galerius' (who died of natural causes), Licinius acquires parts of his domains, thus ruling over territories both in the East and West.

Tetrarchy of Augusti May 311 – August 313
Western Roman Empire	Eastern Roman Empire
Licinius Augustus	
Constantine Augustus	Maximinus Augustus
Usurpers
Maxentius; In Italy and Africa (until 28 October 312)	—

Licinius eventually fights and defeats Maximinus, gaining all eastern territories. He then makes peace with Constantine, who remains as the emperor of the West. This joint rule lasted until 316, when Licinius rejected Constantine's election of Bassianus as caesar. In the ensuing war, both augusti appointed their own sons as caesares, restoring a dynastic system. Licinius appointed Valens and Martinian as augustus in 316 and 324 respectively (literary sources refer to them as caesar, but coins bear the title augustus); almost nothing is known about them.

New Diarchy August 313 – 18 September 324
Western Roman Empire	Eastern Roman Empire
Constantine Augustus	Licinius Augustus
Crispus Caesar from 317	Valens Augustus in 316 (Note: Nominal emperor of the West.)
Constantine Caesar from 317	Martinian Augustus in 324 (Note: Nominal emperor of the West.)
—	Licinius Caesar from 317

== Chronological table ==
Chronological scheme of the Tetrarchy (286–324)

(See also: Simplified Family tree of Tetrarchs)

Year	Western Roman Empire			Eastern Roman Empire		
Year	Usurpers	Caesares	Augustus	Augustus	Caesares	Usurpers
286–293	Carausius		Maximian	Diocletian		
293–296	Allectus	Constantius I	Maximian	Diocletian	Galerius	
297		Constantius I	Maximian	Diocletian	Galerius	Domitian III
298		Constantius I	Maximian	Diocletian	Galerius	Achilleus
298–305		Constantius I	Maximian	Diocletian	Galerius	
306	Maxentius; Maximian	Severus II	Constantius I	Galerius	Maximinus II	
307	Maxentius; Maximian	Constantine I	Severus II	Galerius	Maximinus II	
308–310	Alexander; Maxentius; Maximian	Constantine I	Licinius I	Galerius	Maximinus II	
311–312	Maxentius		Constantine I	Licinius I Maximinus II		
313			Constantine I	Licinius I Maximinus II		
313–316			Constantine I	Licinius I		
316–317		Crispus	Constantine I Valens I	Licinius I	Licinius II	
317–324		Constantine II	Constantine I	Licinius I	Licinius II	
324		Constantine II	Constantine I Martinian	Licinius I	Licinius II; Constantius II	
324–333		Constantine II	Constantine I (Sole Roman Emperor)		Constantius II	
333–335		Constantine II; Constans I	Constantine I (Sole Roman Emperor)		Constantius II	
335–337		Constantine II; Constans I Dalmatius	Constantine I (Sole Roman Emperor)		Constantius II	

== Legacy ==
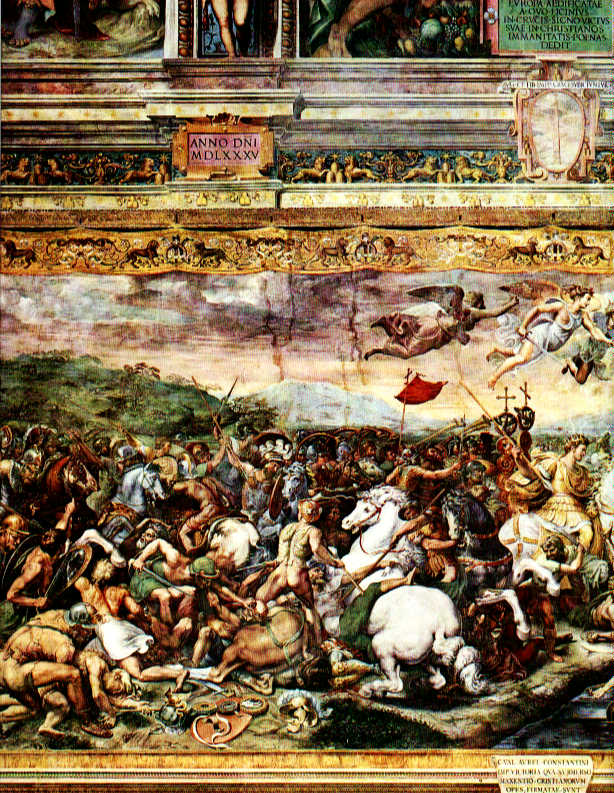
Constantine at the battle of the Milvian Bridge, fresco by Raphael, Vatican Rooms.

Although the tetrarchic system as such only lasted until 313, many aspects of it survived. The fourfold regional division of the empire continued in the form of Praetorian prefectures, each of which was overseen by a praetorian prefect and subdivided into administrative dioceses, and often reappeared in the title of the military supra-provincial command assigned to a magister militum.

The pre-existing notion of consortium imperii, the sharing of imperial power, and the notion that an associate to the throne was the designated successor (possibly conflicting with the notion of hereditary claim by birth or adoption), was to reappear repeatedly.

The idea of the two halves, the east and the west, re-emerged and eventually resulted in the permanent de facto division into two separate Roman empires after the death of Theodosius I; though, importantly, the Empire was never formally divided. The emperors of the eastern and western halves legally ruled as one imperial college until the Fall of the Western Roman Empire left Byzantium, the "second Rome", as the sole direct heir.

== Other examples ==
- Tetrarchies in the ancient world existed in both Thessaly (in northern Greece) and Galatia (in central Asia Minor; including Lycaonia) as well as among the British Cantiaci.
- The constellation of Jewish principalities in the Herodian kingdom of Judea was known as a tetrarchy; see Tetrarchy (Judea).
- In the novel The Lion, the Witch and the Wardrobe, the Pevensie siblings rule Narnia as a tetrarchy of two kings and two queens. Peter was High King and Susan was High Queen, making them the Augusti of the group. Lucy was simply Queen and Edmund was simply King, making them the Caesares of the group.

== See also ==
- Notitia dignitatum, a later document from the imperial chancery
- Problem of two emperors – Problem arising when multiple people claim the title of emperor
- Coregency
- Diarchy
