= Battle of Tzirallum =

313 CE battle

- Part of the civil wars of the Tetrarchy
Date	30 April 313
Location	near Heraclea Perinthus (modern-day Marmara Ereğlisi, Tekirdağ, Turkey) 41°09′N 27°48′E
Result	Licinius victory

Belligerents
Forces of Licinius	Forces of Maximinus

Commanders and leaders
Licinius	Maximinus

Strength
30,000	70,000
- Location within Mediterranean Battle of Tzirallum (Marmara) Battle of Tzirallum (Black Sea)

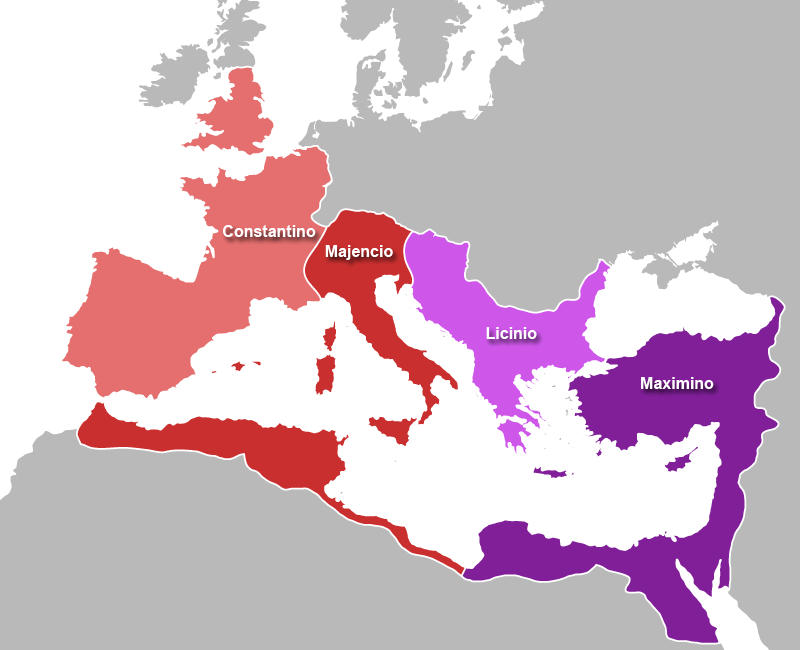
Roman Empire in 311. Territories corresponding to the tetrarcas.

The Battle of Tzirallum was part of the civil wars of the Tetrarchy fought on 30 April 313 between the Roman armies of emperors Licinius and Maximinus. The battle location was on the "Campus Serenus" at Tzirallum, identified as the modern-day town of Çorlu, in Tekirdağ Province, in the Turkish region of Eastern Thrace. Sources put the battle between 18 and 36 Roman miles from Heraclea Perinthus, the modern-day town of Marmara Ereğlisi.

== Background ==
After the death of Galerius in AD 311, there remained four emperors in the Roman world: Constantine I, who controlled Gaul, Spain, and Britain; Maxentius, in Africa and Italy; Maximinus Daza in Roman Asia and Egypt; and Licinius in Macedonia, Greece, and Illyricum. The expansionist ambitions of Maxentius and Maximinus led to a bellicose alliance of these princes against Constantine and Licinius, with the understanding that Maxentius would conquer the western provinces of Europe, and Maximinus the east. Constantine, sensing the threat, in turn drew closer to Licinius, and having assured himself of the latter's overt neutrality and secret support, unexpectedly attacked Maxentius in 312. Constantine invaded Italy and defeated Maxentius in a lightning campaign which culminated in the battle of the Milvian Bridge where the latter was killed. After reducing the last holdouts of Maxentius' partisans, the victor addressed a friendly dispatch to Licinius, arranging to meet him at Milan where the Illyrian emperor was to wed his sister, in a formal ratification and celebration of their alliance.

Meanwhile, Maximinus, on the basis of his agreement with Maxentius, had been mobilizing for war, though he concealed his intentions from Licinius with carefulness and success; as soon as his forces were prepared, though it was the middle of winter, he marched hurriedly with his army of 70,000 men through Anatolia from Antioch, arriving opposite Byzantium while the Illyrian emperor was still at Milan. Maximinus' anxiety to catch Licinius unprepared had led to much equipment, not to mention morale, being lost in the winter march through the harsh provinces of Asia-Minor. As soon as Licinius received news of the enemy's attack, Licinius hastened from Milan to meet the invasion, assembling the resources of Illyria in his hurried course through the province. Maximinus had crossed the Bosphorus, captured Byzantium, and then besieged the town of Heraclea Perinthus, which he captured after a siege of eight days. Maximinus moved ahead to the "first station", 18 miles beyond Heraclea. On arriving there, news reached him that Licinius, coming from Adrianople had already pitched camp with his force at the second station, 18 miles further ahead. Because of the scant time allowed him for preparation, Licinius was outnumbered by over two-to-one, possessing only 30,000 soldiers. It is recorded that an attempt at negotiation took place before the conflict, but was broken off after bad faith was revealed on both sides, after which it was decided to settle the matter by arms. The battle location, Tzirallum, is identified with the contemporary town of Tzouroulon, which is the modern Turkish city of Çorlu.

== Battle ==
In spite of his marked numerical disadvantage, Licinius won a complete victory, shattering the eastern legions and reducing Maximinus to the inglorious expedient of flight. The greater discipline and experience of Licinius and his army contributed to the victory of the Illyrian legions.

== Aftermath ==
After his defeat, Maximinus attempted to regroup, hoping to raise a new army with which to encounter Licinius; amongst other measures, he reversed his policy of persecuting Christians, which had only played to the favor of his rival. However, though his resources might have sufficed to prolong the war for a considerable time against Licinius, and the latter apparently hesitated to pursue him, hostilities terminated with Daza's death of disease in Tarsus, Cilicia, several months after Tzirallum. Upon his competitor's death, Licinius took over the eastern provinces without a struggle.

As a result of this victory, and Constantine's against Maxentius, a new balance of power was formed in the empire, with west facing east. Ultimately, after two more civil wars in which Licinius was defeated, in 317 and 324, Constantine I would emerge as the sole and unchallenged ruler of the Roman Empire.

== See also ==
- Battle of Cibalae (316)
- Battle of Mardia (316/317)
- Battle of Adrianople (324)
- Battle of the Hellespont (324)
- Battle of Chrysopolis (324)
