= 317 =

317 in various calendars
Gregorian calendar	317; CCCXVII
Ab urbe condita	1070
Assyrian calendar	5067
Balinese saka calendar	238–239
Bengali calendar	−277 – −276
Berber calendar	1267
Buddhist calendar	861
Burmese calendar	−321
Byzantine calendar	5825–5826
Chinese calendar	丙子年 (Fire Rat); 3014 or 2807 — to — 丁丑年 (Fire Ox); 3015 or 2808
Coptic calendar	33–34
Discordian calendar	1483
Ethiopian calendar	309–310
Hebrew calendar	4077–4078
- Hindu calendars
Vikram Samvat	373–374
Shaka Samvat	238–239
Kali Yuga	3417–3418
Holocene calendar	10317
Iranian calendar	305 BP – 304 BP
Islamic calendar	314 BH – 313 BH
Javanese calendar	197–199
Julian calendar	317; CCCXVII
Korean calendar	2650
Minguo calendar	1595 before ROC 民前1595年
Nanakshahi calendar	−1151
Seleucid era	628/629 AG
Thai solar calendar	859–860
Tibetan calendar	མེ་ཕོ་བྱི་བ་ལོ་ (male Fire-Rat); 443 or 62 or −710 — to — མེ་མོ་གླང་ལོ་ (female Fire-Ox); 444 or 63 or −709

Year 317 (CCCXVII) was a common year starting on Tuesday of the Julian calendar. At the time, it was known as the Year of the Consulship of Gallicanus and Bassus (or, less frequently, year 1070 Ab urbe condita). The denomination 317 for this year has been used since the early medieval period, when the Anno Domini calendar era became the prevalent method in Europe for naming years.

== Events ==
=== By place ===
==== Roman Empire ====
- March 1 – Emperor Constantine the Great and co-emperor Licinius elevate their sons Crispus, Constantine II and Licinius II to Caesars. After this arrangement Constantine rules the dioceses Pannonia and Macedonia, and establishes his residence at Sirmium, from where he prepares a campaign against the Goths and Sarmatians.
- Licinius recognizes Constantine I as senior emperor and executes Valerius Valens.

==== Asia ====
- Sixteen Kingdoms: Jingwen (later Yuan of Jin) flees with remnants of the Jin court and noble families to the south. He succeeds Emperor Min of Jin as first ruler of the Eastern Jin Dynasty and decides to make Jiankang (modern Nanjing) his new capital.
- The earliest historically verified reference to tea is recorded, although the Chinese have been drinking the beverage for centuries.

== Births ==
- August 7 – Constantius II, Roman emperor (d. 361)
- Fú Jiàn, Chinese emperor of the Former Qin (d. 355)
- Junius Bassus Theotecnius, Roman politician (d. 359)
- Themistius, Byzantine statesman and philosopher

== Deaths ==
- Valerius Valens, Roman emperor
