= Battle of Mardia =

317 CE battle

Coordinates: 41°56′N 25°54′E

- Part of the civil wars of the Tetrarchy
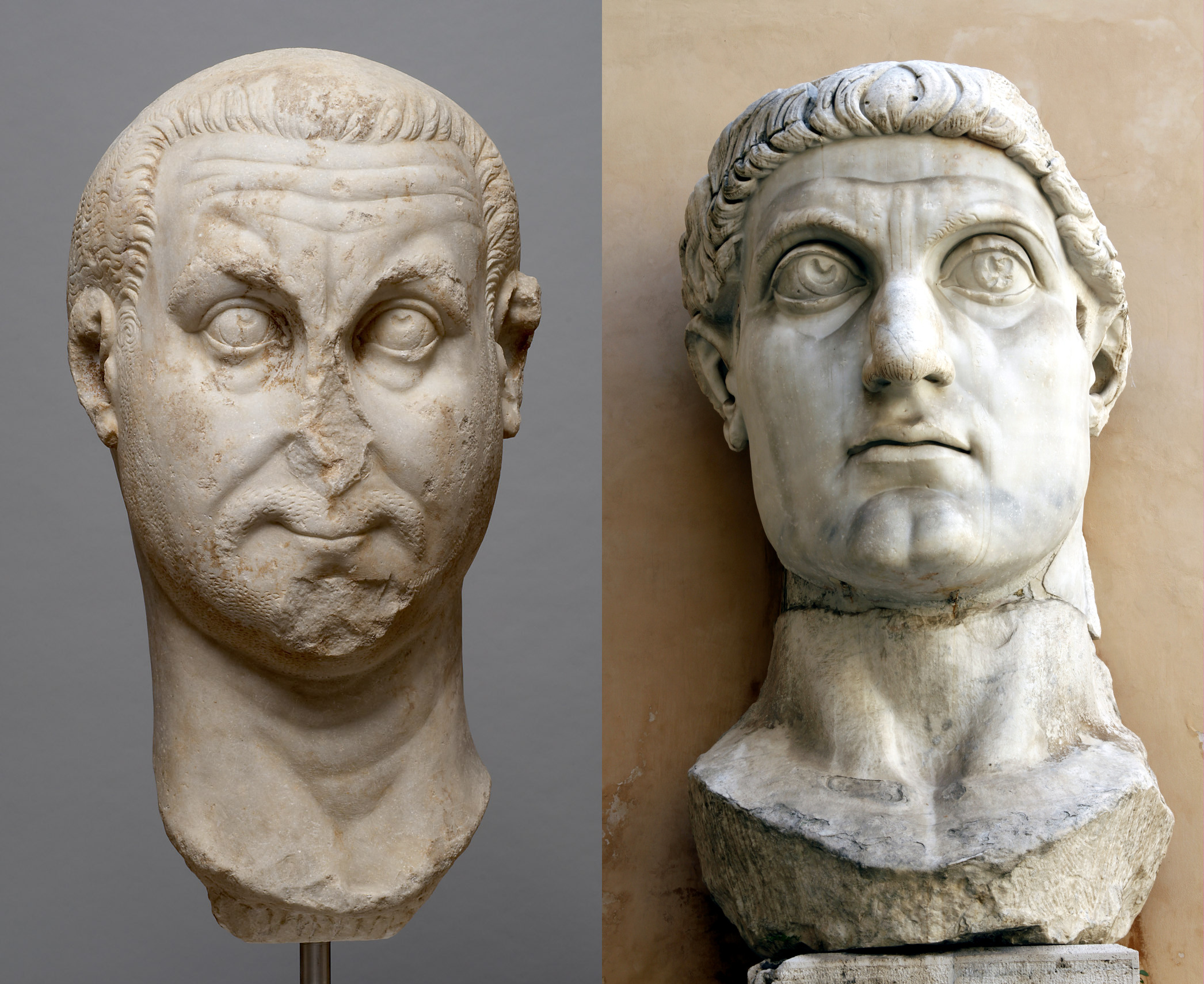
- Left: bust of Licinius in Kunsthistorisches Museum, Vienna; right: head of the colossal statue of Constantine I in the Palazzo dei Conservatori, Rome.
Date	late 316 or early 317 AD
Location	the basin of Ardas River, Greece or Harmanli, Bulgaria
Result	Constantinian victory

Belligerents
Constantine	Licinius

Commanders and leaders
Constantine the Great	Licinius, Valerius Valens

Strength
Unknown	Unknown

Casualties and losses
Unknown	Unknown

The Battle of Mardia, also known as Battle of Campus Mardiensis or Battle of Campus Ardiensis, was fought in late 316/early 317 between the forces of Roman Emperors Constantine I and Licinius. Its location was probably modern Harmanli (Bulgaria) in Thrace.

== Background ==
Open civil war between the emperors broke out in 316, when Constantine invaded Licinius' Balkan provinces. After his crushing defeat at the Battle of Cibalae on October 8, 316 (some historians date it in 314), Licinius fled to Sirmium then further south to Adrianople. There he collected a second army, under the command of an officer named Valerius Valens whom he raised to the rank of augustus. Simultaneously he tried to negotiate, but Constantine, insulted by the elevation of Valens and confident from his recent victory, rejected the peace offer.

== Battle ==
In the meantime, Constantine had moved through the Balkan mountains and established his base at Philippi or Philippopolis. Another possible location for the battle place is a few km west-southwest of Adrianople (modern Edirne), at the basin of the Ardas River (ancient Harpessos), a tributary of the Maritsa River.

Constantine led the bulk of his army against Licinius, and a fierce battle ensued. Both sides inflicted heavy injuries on each other until darkness interrupted the indecisive struggle. Reportedly, Constantine decided the issue by sending a force to attack Licinius in the rear; Licinius was forced to retreat, but his well-disciplined troops kept ranks and withdrew in good order, and both armies suffered further heavy losses. During the night, Licinius managed to keep his army from disintegration and retreated north-west towards Beroe/Augusta Traiana. Thus, Constantine was again victorious but not decisively.

== Aftermath ==
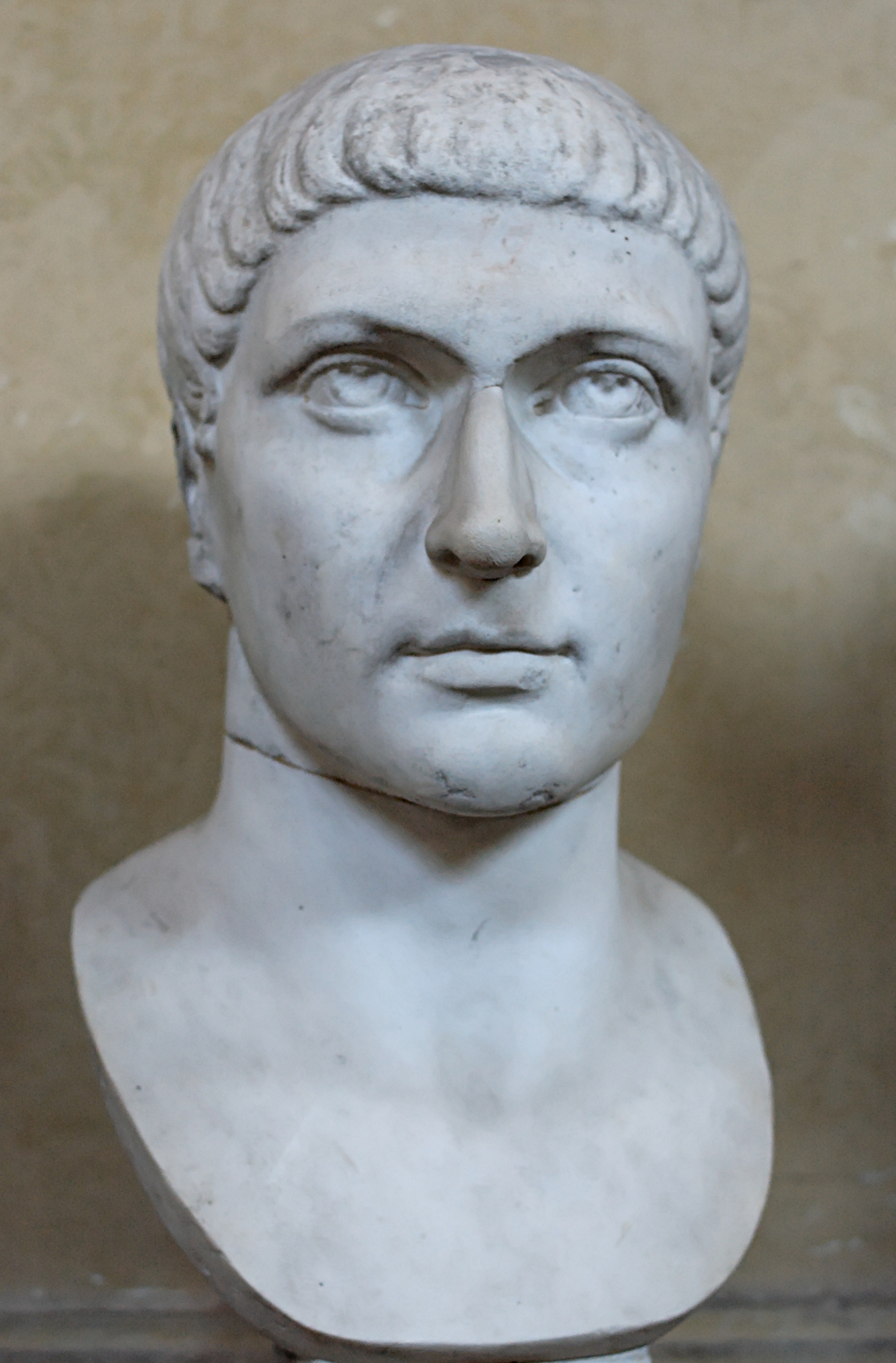
Portrait bust of Constantine I

Constantine, thinking that Licinius was fleeing to Byzantium in order to retreat to his Asian base, headed in that direction, unintentionally placing Licinius between himself and his communication lines with the West. It seemed that his aggressiveness had worked against him this time. However, both belligerents had reasons to come to terms since Licinius was still in precarious position, so he sent a certain Mestrianus to negotiate with Constantine. Even then, Constantine delayed the discussions until he was made sure that the outcome of the war was indeed uncertain. A critical point might be when he received news of a sudden enemy raid that captured his baggage and the royal entourage.

According to the peace finalized at Serdica on 1 March 317 (a date chosen deliberately by Constantine because it was the anniversary of his father's elevation), Licinius recognised Constantine as his superior in government, ceded to him all European territories except for Thrace and deposed and executed Valens. Constantine named himself and Licinius consuls while his two sons Crispus and Constantine II and Licinius' son, also called Licinius, were all appointed Caesars. The peace lasted for about seven years.
