= Battle of Chrysopolis =

Part of the civil wars of the Tetrarchy (324 AD)

- Part of the civil wars of the Tetrarchy
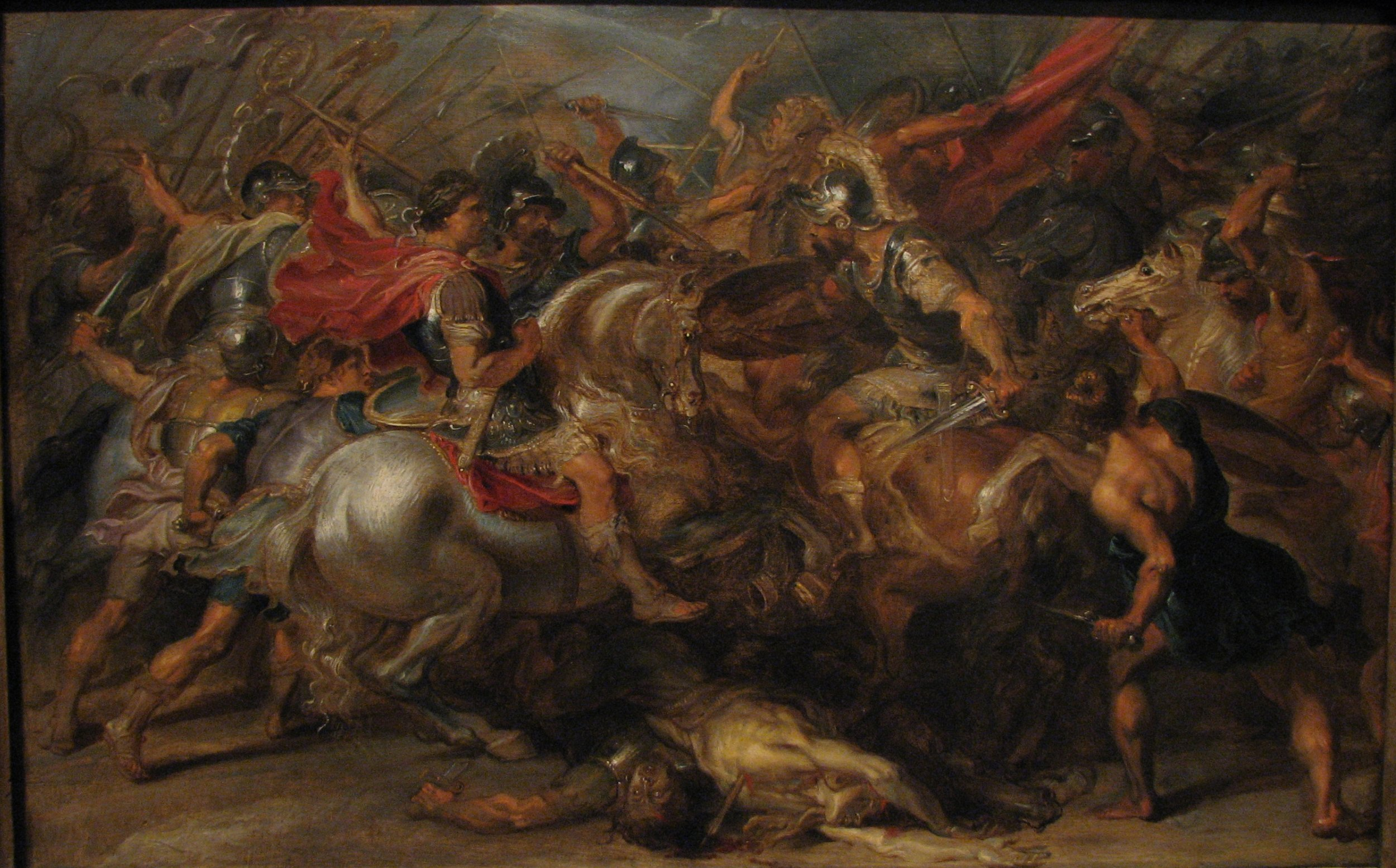
- The battle of Constantine and Licinius by Peter Paul Rubens, c. 17th century.
Date	18 September 324
Location	Chrysopolis (modern Üsküdar, Turkey) 41.015°N 29.030°E
Result	Constantinian victory

Belligerents
Constantine the Great	Licinius

Strength
Unknown	Unknown

Casualties and losses
Unknown	25,000–30,000 killed (Note: Zosimus gives a casualty figure of 100,000, but this is widely regarded as exaggerated. Nicasie argues that the lower number preserved in the Anonymus Valesianus (25,000) is far more credible.)

The Battle of Chrysopolis was fought on 18 September 324 between the Roman emperors Constantine I and Licinius near Chrysopolis (modern Üsküdar), opposite Byzantium (modern Istanbul) on the Asiatic shore of the Bosphorus. The battle followed Constantine's victory at the Battle of the Hellespont, where his son Crispus destroyed the Licinian fleet. Licinius withdrew his forces from Byzantium to Chalcedon (modern Kadıköy) and gathered the remnants of his army, reinforced by Visigothic auxiliaries and the troops of the co-emperor Martinian.

Constantine crossed the Bosphorus into Asia Minor and marched on Chrysopolis. Licinius drew up his army with the traditional pagan standards, while Constantine advanced under the labarum. Constantine launched a direct attack that routed Licinius' troops. Ancient sources report heavy losses for Licinius, and he retreated with the survivors to Nicomedia (modern Izmit).

The defeat ended the civil war between the two emperors. Licinius surrendered soon afterwards, was initially spared, and was later executed after being accused of treason. His son was killed the following year. Constantine became sole ruler of the Roman Empire, ending the period of the Tetrarchy. He later refounded Byzantium as Constantinople, establishing a new imperial capital.

== Background ==
The navy of Licinius had suffered a catastrophic defeat at the Battle of the Hellespont. His admiral, Abantus, had been outfought by Constantine's son, the caesar Crispus, despite the latter's distinctly smaller fleet. Following this naval victory, Constantine crossed over to Asia Minor. An army, under the command of Licinius' newly appointed co-emperor Martinian, was guarding the coast at Lampsacus on the Hellespont. Constantine had a flotilla of light transports built on the Bosphorus, allowing him to avoid that army entirely when crossing into Asia Minor.

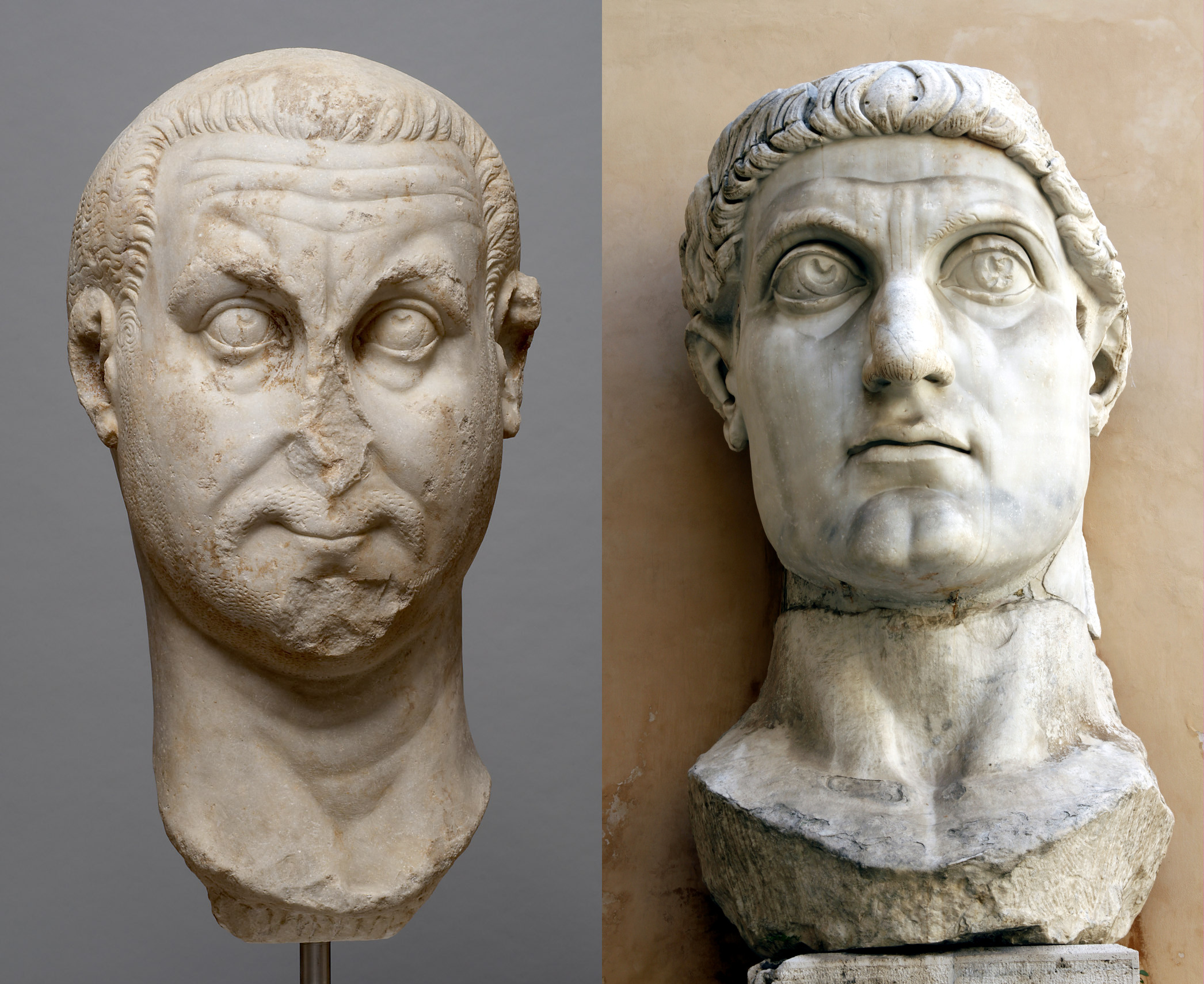
Heads from former statues of Licinius (left) and Constantine (right).

Following the destruction of his naval forces, Licinius evacuated the garrison of Byzantium, which subsequently joined his main army in Chalcedon (modern Kadiköy) on the Asiatic shore of the Bosphorus. From there he also summoned Martinian's forces and a band of Visigothic auxiliaries, under their leader Aliquaca (or Alica), to reinforce his principal army, as it had been depleted by its earlier defeat at the Battle of Adrianople. It is not clear whether Martinian's forces reached Licinius before September 18, when Licinius was brought to battle by Constantine.

== Battle ==
Constantine's army landed on the Asiatic shore of the Bosphorus at a place called "the Sacred Promontory" and marched southward towards Chalcedon. Licinius moved his army a short distance north towards Chrysopolis. Constantine's army reached the environs of Chrysopolis before the forces of Licinius. Constantine formed his army on high ground and awaited the arrival of the opposing army. Following a retreat to his tent to seek divine guidance, Constantine decided to take the initiative.

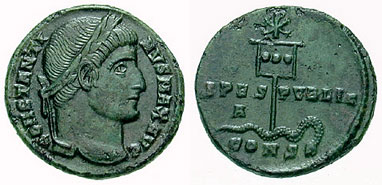
A coin of Constantine (c. 337) showing a depiction of his Labarum standard spearing a serpent.

The religious aspect of the conflict was reflected in Licinius drawing up his battle lines with images of the pagan gods of Rome prominently displayed, whilst Constantine's army fought under his talismanic Christian standard, the labarum. Licinius had developed a superstitious dread of the labarum and forbade his troops from attacking it, or even looking directly at it.

Constantine had an advantage in being able to clearly see the dispositions of Licinius' force from his army's position on higher ground. Constantine did not attempt any preliminary manoeuvring, unlike in earlier battles, but launched a direct frontal assault on Licinius' troops and routed them. This onset is described as, "By a single charge [Constantine] overthrew in a moment the entire body of the enemy." He won a decisive victory in what was a very large-scale battle. It is possible that the brief nature of the fight was the result of Licinius having suffered heavy casualties to his most reliable and veteran troops in earlier defeats. According to the fifth-century historian Zosimus, "There was great slaughter at Chrysopolis". Licinius was reported to have lost 25,000 to 30,000 men, with thousands more breaking and running in flight. Licinius managed to escape and gathered around 30,000 of his surviving troops at his capital Nicomedia (modern Izmit).

Modern assessments of the size of the opposing forces are cautious. Ancient writers give widely varying numbers, and the larger totals attributed to Zosimus, are viewed with suspicion by modern historians. Zosimus is the source for the highest estimates for several late Roman battles and his figure of 100,000 casualties for Licinius at Chrysopolis is considered especially unreliable. Other contemporary evidence, such as the Anonymus Valesianus, preserves a far lower total of around 25,000 dead, which recent scholarship regards as the more plausible scale of loss.

== Aftermath ==
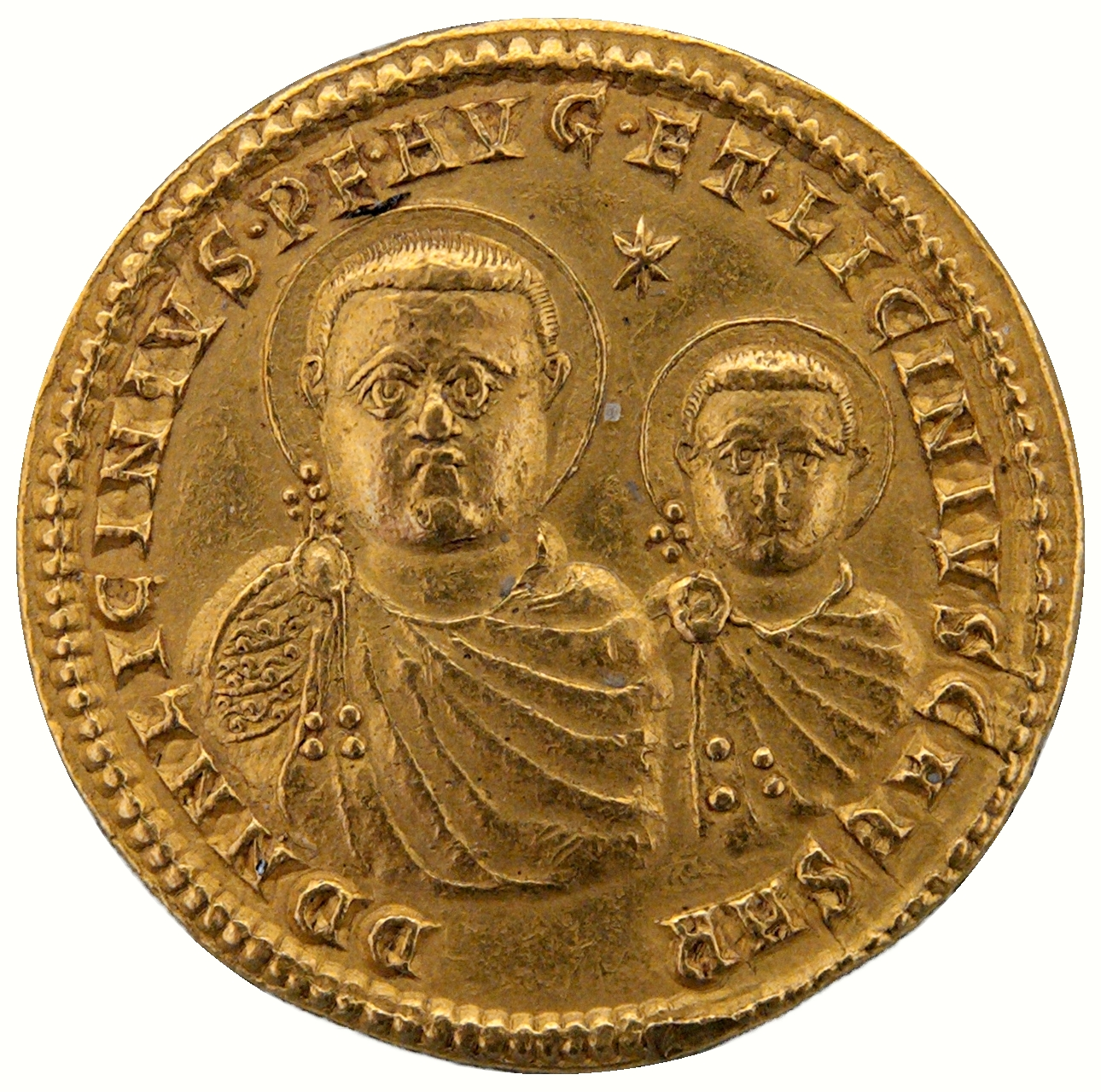
Gold multiple showing Licinius and his son Licinius II, executed after Constantine’s victory.

Recognising that his surviving forces in Nicomedia could not stand against Constantine's victorious army, Licinius was persuaded to throw himself on the mercy of his enemy. Constantia, Constantine's half-sister and Licinius' wife, acted as intermediary. Initially, yielding to the pleas of his sister, Constantine spared the life of his brother-in-law, but some months later he ordered his execution, thereby breaking his solemn oath. According to Christian historian Socrates Scholasticus, this occurred because Licinius was suspected of treasonable actions, having conspired with the Goths, and the army command pressed for his execution. A year later, Constantine's nephew, the younger Licinius, the son of Licinius, also fell victim to the emperor's anger or suspicions. He was executed in 326 and had his name expunged from official inscriptions.

In defeating his last foe, Licinius, Constantine became the sole emperor of the Roman Empire; the first such since the elevation of Maximian to the status of Augustus by Diocletian in April 286. After his conquest of the eastern portion of the Roman Empire, Constantine made the momentous decision to give the east its own capital, and the empire as a whole its second. He chose the city of Byzantium, renamed Constantinopolis, as the site of this new foundation.

== See also ==
- Battle of Adrianople
- Late Roman army

== Sources ==
=== Primary sources ===
- Pamphilius, Eusebius. Eusebius Pamphilius: Church History, Life of Constantine, Oration in Praise of Constantine. Library of Alexandria. ISBN 978-1-4655-4116-1.
- Zosimus (22 September 2017). The New History. CSI. ISBN 978-1-9775-4172-7.

=== Secondary sources ===
- Clercq, Victor Cyril De (1954). Ossius of Cordova: A Contribution to the History of the Constantinian Period. Catholic University of America Press. ISBN 978-0-8132-0228-0.
- Dunstan, William E. (16 November 2010). Ancient Rome. Bloomsbury Publishing PLC. ISBN 978-0-7425-6834-1.
- Grant, Michael (1994). Constantine the Great: The Man and His Times. Scribner's. ISBN 978-0-684-19520-9.
- Grant, Michael (1985). The Roman Emperors: A Biographical Guide to the Rulers of Imperial Rome, 31 BC-AD 476. Scribner's. ISBN 978-0-684-18388-6.
- Grant, Michael (1998). The Emperor Constantine. Phoenix Giant. ISBN 978-0-7538-0528-2.
- Hughes, Ian (2020) A Military Life of Constantine the Great, Pen & Sword Books, Yorkshire. ISBN 978 1 52672 423 6
- Lenski, Noel (14 November 2005). The Cambridge Companion to the Age of Constantine. Cambridge University Press. ISBN 978-1-139-82688-4.
- Mitchell, Stephen; Greatrex, Geoffrey (25 May 2023). A History of the Later Roman Empire, AD 284-700. John Wiley & Sons. ISBN 978-1-119-76857-9.
- Nicasie, Martijn (16 January 2023). Twilight of Empire: The Roman Army from the Reign of Diocletian until the Battle of Adrianople. BRILL. ISBN 978-90-04-52580-1.
- Odahl, Charles (2 July 2010). Constantine and the Christian Empire. Routledge. ISBN 978-1-136-96127-4.
- Parker, H. M. D. (28 August 2024). A History of the Roman World from A.D. 138 to 337. Taylor & Francis. ISBN 978-1-04-003539-9.
- Stephenson, Paul (4 August 2011). Constantine: Unconquered emperor, Christian victor. Quercus. ISBN 978-1-84916-644-7.
- Volz, Carl A. (1983). Faith and Practice in the Early Church: Foundations for Contemporary Theology. Augsburg Publishing House. ISBN 978-0-8066-1961-3.
