= Licinius II =

Roman caesar from 317 to 324

- Caesar
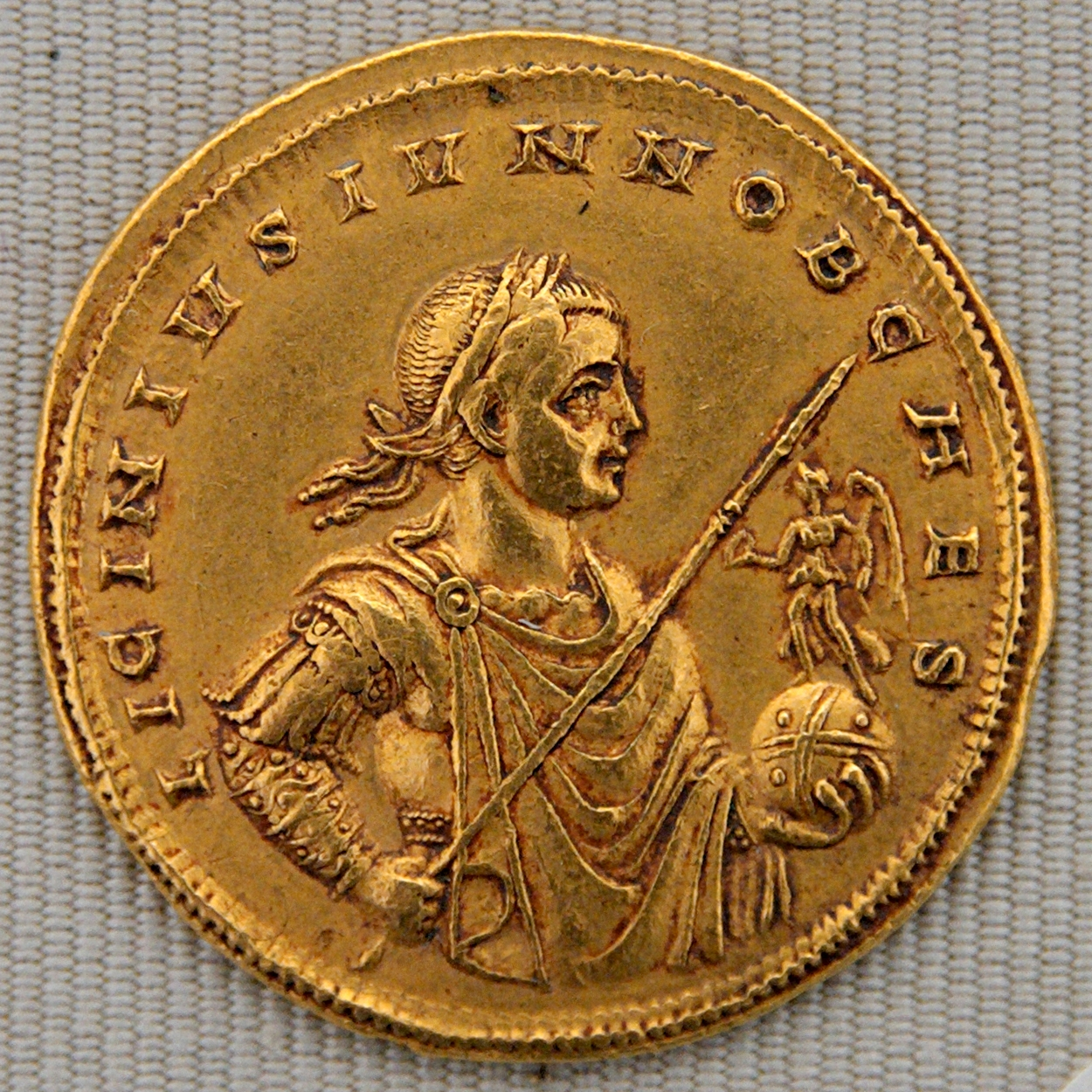
- Licinius II depicted in armour holding a spear and an orb surmounted by a victory. Inscribed: licinius iun· nob· caes· ("Licinius Junior, Most Noble Caesar")
- Caesar: 1 March 317–19 September 324
- Augusti Co-Caesares: Licinius I, Constantine I Crispus, Constantine II
- Born: c. July/August 315
- Died: c. 326
Names
- Valerius Licinianus Licinius
Regnal name
- Valerius Licinianus Licinius Nobilissmus Caesar
- Dynasty: Constantinian
- Father: Licinius
- Mother: Flavia Julia Constantia

Licinius II, also called Licinius Junior or Licinius Caesar (Latin: Valerius Licinianus Licinius; c. July/August 315 – c. 326), was the son of the Roman emperor Licinius I. He held the imperial rank of caesar between March 317 and September 324, while his father was augustus, and he was twice Roman consul. After losing a civil war, his father lost power and both he and Licinius Junior were eventually put to death.

== Family and background ==
Licinius I married Flavia Julia Constantia, daughter of the augustus Constantius Chlorus and augusta Flavia Maximiana Theodora, and thus a half-sister of the augustus Constantine I. They wed at Mediolanum (Milan) in February 313. Three years later, Constantine attacked Licinius in the Cibalensean War. Constantine defeated Licinius at the Battle of Cibalae at Cibalae (Vinkovci) in Pannonia Secunda on the 8 October 316 and again at the Battle of Mardia near Hadrianopolis in Haemimontus (Edirne).

== Life ==
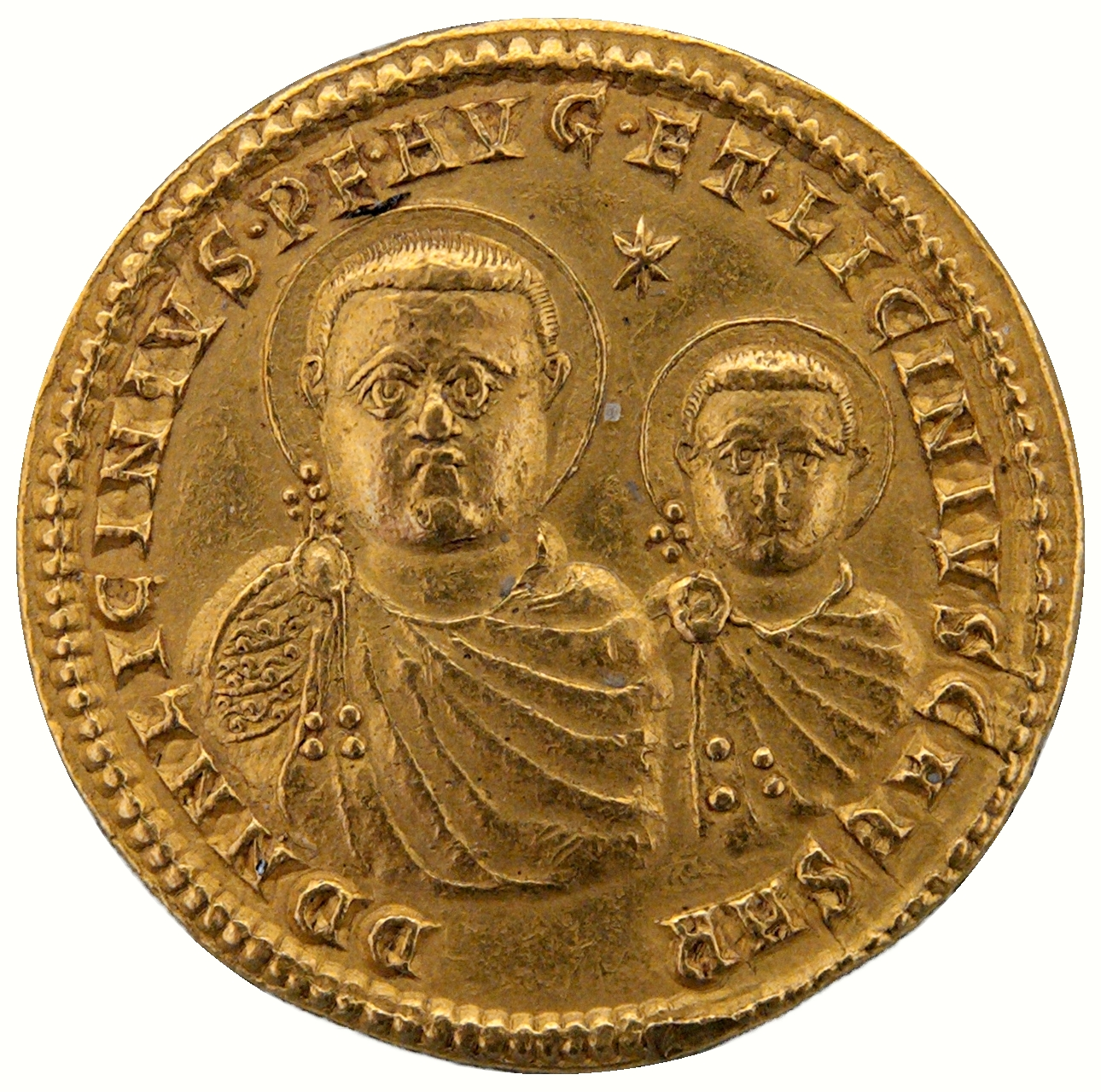
Gold multiple, worth 4 aurei, marked: dd nn licinius·p f·aug·et·licinius caesar ("Our Lords Licinius, Pious Blessed Augustus, and Licinius Caesar")

Licinius II, son of Licinius, grandson of Constantius I, and half-nephew of Constantine, was born to Flavia Julia Constantia in July or August 315.

While the augustus Licinius marched against Constantine in 316, Licinius II was left with his mother and the augustus's treasury at Sirmium (Sremska Mitrovica). After Licinius was defeated by Constantine at the Battle of Cibalae, and lost two thirds of his army, he fled to Sirmium and thence to Singidunum (Belgrade), where he crossed the river Sava and destroyed the bridge to delay Constantine's pursuit of him. With this delay, Licinius and his family reached Hadrianopolis. After Constantine reached Philippopolis (Plovdiv), and after he and Licinius failed to come to terms over Licinius's appointment of Valerius Valens as co-augustus, the Battle of the Mardia (or "of Campus Ardiensis", probably Harmanli) ensued, in which Licinius was again defeated.

Licinius failed to flee towards Byzantium (Istanbul) as expected, and outmanoeuvred Constantine by marching to Beroea (Veria) while Constantine continued to Byzantium, this placed him across Constantine's lines of communication and supply. Additionally, Licinius captured Constantine's baggage train. As a result, Licinius and Constantine made peace: excepting the dioecesis of Thrace, all the territory formerly administered by Licinius in the Balkans was ceded to Constantine's control. Constantine was to be recognized as senior augustus, and all Licinius and Constantine's sons were to be mutually recognized as caesares.

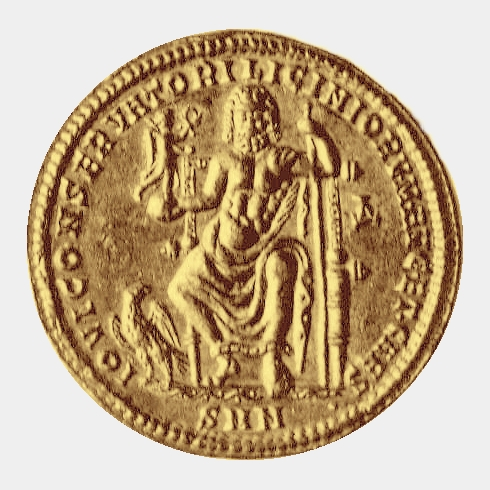
Reverse marked: iovi conservatori liciniorum aug·et·caes ("Jupiter the Conservator of the Licinii, Augustus and Caesar")

=== Caesar ===
On the 1 March 317 Licinius II was raised to the imperial rank of caesar by agreement between his father and Constantine. Constantine's sons Crispus and the infant Constantine II were elevated to caesar on the same day, at Serdica (Sofia). The date was chosen especially; it was the dies imperii (date of accession) of Constantine's father and Licinius's father-in-law Constantius I, the grandfather of all the new caesares. Crispus was no older than 17, while Constantine II was, at seven months, even younger than Licinius II, who was then only 20 months old. Sharing the same day of investiture, none of the caesares could claim seniority. Licinius II retained his title until 324, throughout the time his father remained in power.

Licinius is said by Themistius to have been educated by the grammaticus, and later consul, Flavius Optatus. Licinius was mentioned in the inscription of a Roman milestone from Viennensis as Constantini Aug. sororis filius, 'the son of the sister of Constantine Augustus'.

Licinius II was made consul in 319. His colleague was his uncle Constantine. In 321, the relationship between the two augusti had worsened and each made different nominations for the consulship: Licinius II was made consul for the second time with his father in the east, but Constantine and Crispus held the office in the west (see: list of Roman consuls). Licinius's quinquennalia was celebrated on the 1 March 321. The Munich Treasure was made for the occasion of the quinqennalia; besides a silver bust of Licinius I, three large silver bowls were made for largitio, each weighing a Roman pound – 300 grams (11 oz). The largitio bowls were decorated with portraits of the two emperors, with inscriptions celebrating the quinquennalia of Licinius II as well as a vota (vow of good rulership) for a decennalia.

After his defeats by Constantine and Crispus at the Battle of the Hellespont and the Battle of Chrysopolis (18 September 324), Licinius I surrendered himself and his remaining forces to Constantine at Nicomedia. At the intercession of Flavia Julia Constantia, Constantine spared his brother-in-law and nephew. Licinius the Elder retired to Thessalonica as a private citizen. Immediately after his father's defeat and capitulation the Licinius II was stripped of the title of caesar. Constantine seems to have regretted his leniency and the former augustus was hanged in the spring of 325. The former augustus had been accused of plotting to renew hostilities and was executed on this pretext, real or imagined. Licinius's co-emperor and augustus Martinian was also executed, either at this time or in 324. Licinius II survived until the following year.

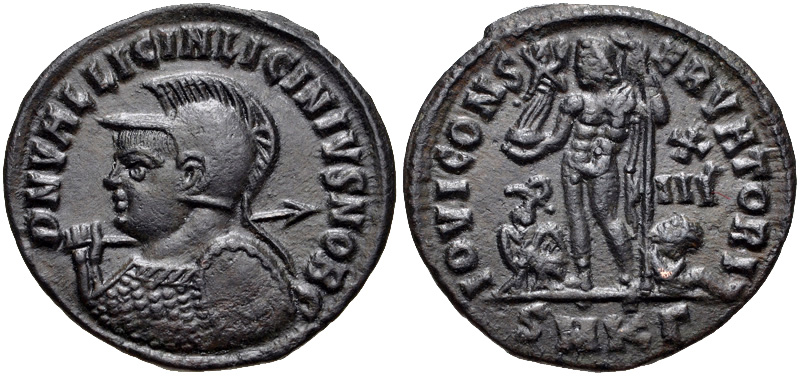
Follis of Licinius II, 321–324 marked: d·n· val· licin· licinius nob· c· ("Our Lord Valerius Licinianus Licinius, Most Noble Caesar") on the obverse, with Jupiter on the reverse marked: iovi conservatori ("Jupiter the conservator")

== Death ==
The younger Licinius was executed by his uncle Constantine in 326. He fell victim to the Emperor's suspicions and died at Pola, possibly in the context of the execution of Crispus. Like his father, Licinius II was the subject of a posthumous damnatio memoriae and their names were expunged from official inscriptions.

=== Liciniani filius in the Codex Theodosianus ===
A Liciniani filius, 'son of Licinianus', is noted in two laws in the Codex Theodosianus dated 336. According to the Prosopography of the Later Roman Empire, this was not Licinius II, but rather an illegitimate son legitimated by rescript. This son of the augustus was, by legislation, forced into slavery in the imperial textile factories (gynaeceum) in Carthage, Africa. The text contains a directive that he be reduced to the slave status of his birth. No son of Constantine's sister would have been referred to in this manner, therefore, this "son of Licinianus" must have been the illegitimate son of the emperor by a woman of servile status.

Political offices
Preceded by Licinius Augustus; Crispus Caesar	Roman consul 319 with Constantine I	Succeeded by Constantine I Constantine II
Preceded by Constantine I Constantine II	Roman consul 321 with Licinius Augustus, Crispus, Constantine II	Succeeded by Petronius Probianus; Amnius Anicius Julianus
