= Martinian (emperor) =

Roman emperor in 324

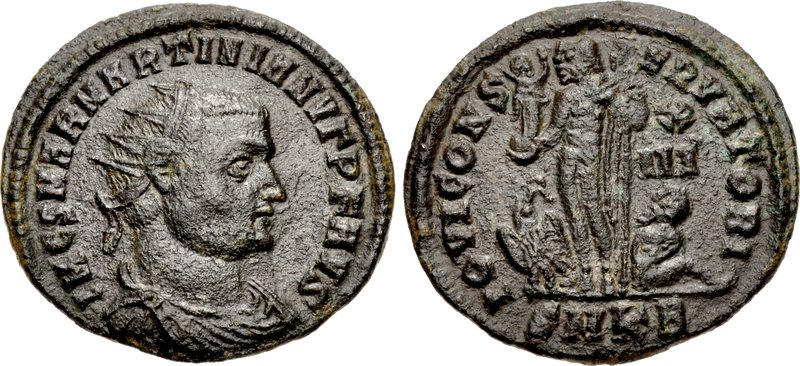
- Follis of Martinian. The obverse shows him wearing the 'radiate crown' associated with solar deities. The reverse shows the god Jupiter holding a winged Victory.

Roman emperor
- Reign: July – 18 September 324
- Predecessor: Licinius
- Successor: Constantine I
- Co-rulers: Licinius; Constantine I
- Died: Spring 325; Cappadocia, Pontus
Names
- (Sextus?) Mar(cius/tinus?) Martinianus
Regnal name
- Imperator Caesar (Sextus?) Mar(cius/tinus?) Martinianus Augustus

Martinian (Latin: Martinianus; died spring 325) was Roman emperor from July to 18 September 324. He was raised to the purple by the emperor Licinius, whom he had hitherto served as a senior bureaucrat, during Licinius's civil war against the emperor Constantine I. Constantine defeated both emperors and forced them to abdicate, and executed them after initially showing leniency.

== Name ==
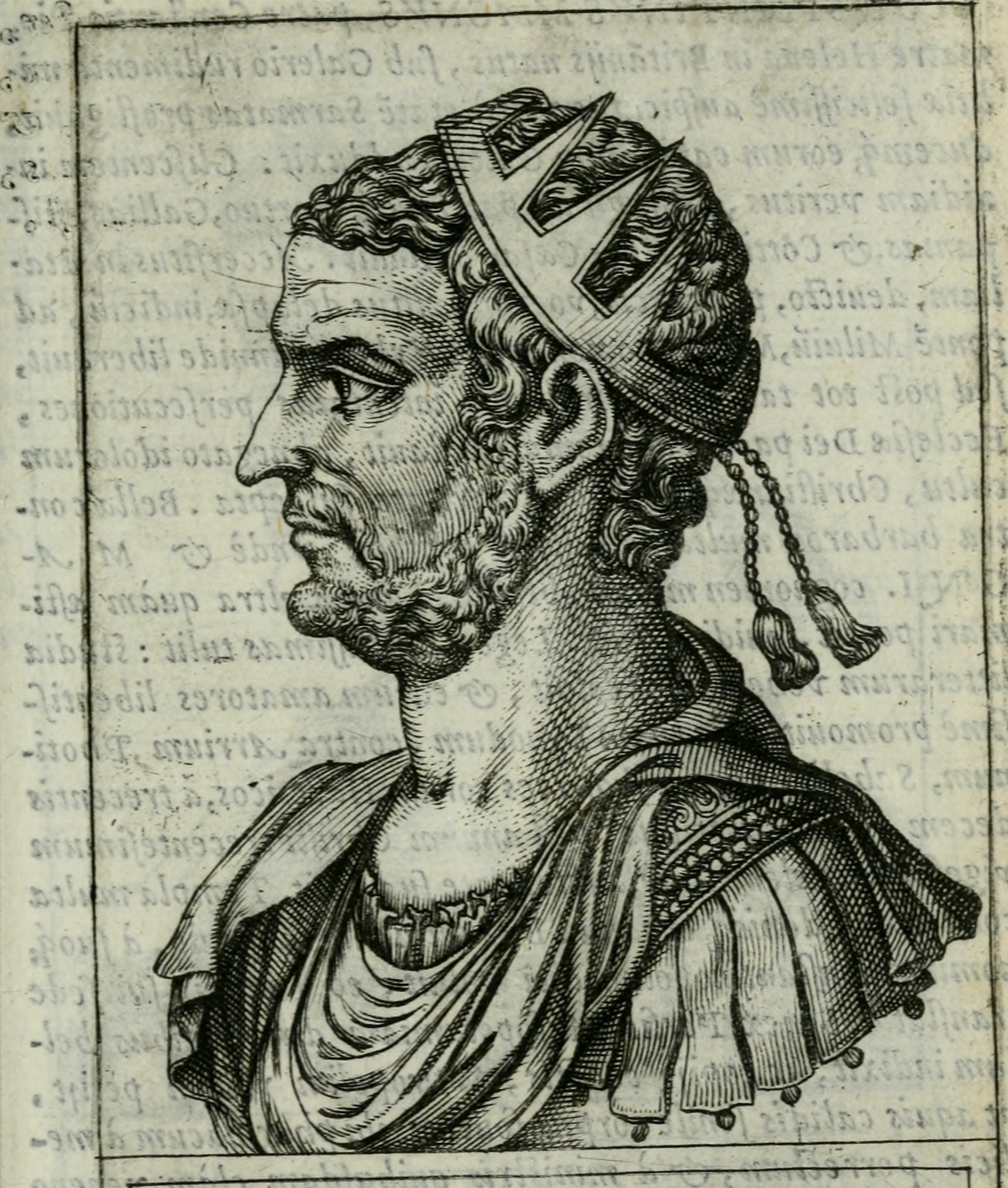
16th-century interpretive portrait of Martinian based on his portraiture on coins

Martinian's full name is ultimately unattested, as it is given only in its abbreviated form on his coins. The portion of his nomen "Mar", which precedes his common name on some of his coins, probably stands for Marcius, or possibly the cognomen Martinus. The letter "S" before his nomen has been interpreted as the forename Sextus, but some modern authors think that with the "C" before it is simply the imperial title Caesar written as "CS".

== Elevation ==
In 324, as the second civil war between Licinius and Constantine I was at its height, the situation for Licinius was not promising. Following his defeat at the Battle of Adrianople, he decided to replace Constantine (in name only) as western Augustus. As his replacement he named Martinian co-emperor, as he had previously appointed Valens during his earlier war with Constantine. Prior to his elevation, which took place some time after the battle of Adrianople, Martinian was serving as magister officiorum at Licinius' court. Licinius lacked the aid of a loyal deputy that Constantine possessed in the person of his eldest son Crispus; Licinius appointed Martinian, though not a relative, to make up this deficiency.

== Military activities ==
In the wake of his defeat at Adrianople Licinius sent Martinian, with an army including Visigothic auxiliaries, to Lampsacus (on the Asiatic shore of the Hellespont or Dardanelles) to prevent Constantine from using his fleet to effect a crossing from Thrace into Mysia and Bithynia in Asia Minor. A naval battle in the Hellespont resulted in the destruction of Licinius' navy by Constantine's son Crispus. Following this defeat, Licinius withdrew his forces from Byzantium, which was being besieged by Constantine, to Chalcedon on the Asiatic shore of the Bosphoros. Constantine then crossed the Bosphoros to Asia Minor, using a flotilla of light transports he had built independently from his main fleet on the Hellespont, in order to evade the forces of Martinian. Licinius recalled Martinian from Lampsacus to reinforce his main army. It is not clear whether Martinian's forces reached Licinius before September 18 when Licinius was defeated for the last time at the Battle of Chrysopolis.

== Fate ==
Due to the intervention of Flavia Julia Constantia, Constantine's sister and also Licinius' wife, both Licinius and Martinian were initially spared, Licinius being imprisoned in Thessalonica, Martinian in Cappadocia; however, Constantine seems to have soon regretted his leniency as both former emperors were subsequently executed. Martinian was probably executed in the spring of 325, in Cappadocia.

== Notes ==
Regnal titles
Preceded by Licinius	Roman emperor 324; With: Licinius	Succeeded by Constantine I
