= Valerius Valens =

Roman emperor from 316 to 317

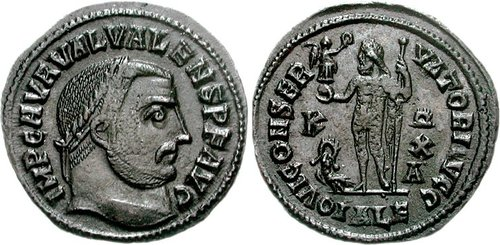
- Follis of Valerius Valens struck in Alexandria

Roman emperor
- Reign: October 316 – c. February 317 (with Licinius, against Constantine I)
- Born: Aurelius Valens
- Died: 317 (shortly after 1 March)
Names
- Aurelius Valerius Valens

Aurelius Valerius Valens (/ˈveɪlənz/; died shortly after 1 March 317), rarely enumerated as Valens I, was briefly Roman emperor from late 316 to early 317. He was proclaimed emperor by Licinius, emperor of the East, during his war against Constantine I, emperor of the West.

== Biography ==
In 316 Valens held the position of dux limitis ("duke of the frontier") in Dacia. On October 8, Constantine I, who controlled the west, won an overwhelming victory at the Battle of Cibalae against Licinius, his co-emperor in the East. The battle is sometimes dated to 314, but contemporary sources indicate that it occurred in 317. Licinius fled to Sirmium where, with the help of Valens, he gathered a second army. He gave Valens the rank of augustus (emperor), probably to replace Constantine in the West. Literary sources refer to Valens only as caesar (heir apparent), but numismatic evidence clearly indicates that he was augustus. Valens adopted the name "Valerius", as was customary among the Tetrarchs.

According to Petrus Patricius, Constantine was infuriated by the news of Valens' promotion:

"The emperor made clear the extent of his rage by his facial expression and by the contortion of his body. Almost unable to speak, he said, "We have not come to this present state of affairs, nor have we fought and triumphed from the ocean till where we have now arrived, just so that we should refuse to have our own brother-in-law as joint ruler because of his abominable behaviour, and so that we should deny his close kinship, but accept that vile slave [i.e. Valens] with him into imperial college".

After Licinius's indecisive defeat at the Battle of Mardia in later 316 or early 317, Constantine was still in the dominant position; from which he was able to force Licinius to recognize him as the senior emperor. According to the Origo Constantini Imperatoris, "Valens was ordered to return again to his former private station; when that was done, peace was concluded by both emperors, with the stipulation that Licinius should hold the Orient, Asia, Thrace, Moesia, and Lesser Scythia." The peace treaty was finalized at Serdica shortly before 1 March 317, the date in which Constantine's sons Constantine II and Constans I were made caesars alongside Licinius' son Licinius II. Whether it was part of the agreement is unknown, but Licinius also had Valens executed. Much later, Licinius would try to elevate another general, Martinian, as co-emperor. However, this had just as little success, resulting in Licinius' defeat and execution.

== Citations ==
Regnal titles
Preceded by Licinius	Roman emperor 316–317; With: Licinius	Succeeded by Licinius
