= Licinius =

Roman emperor from 308 to 324

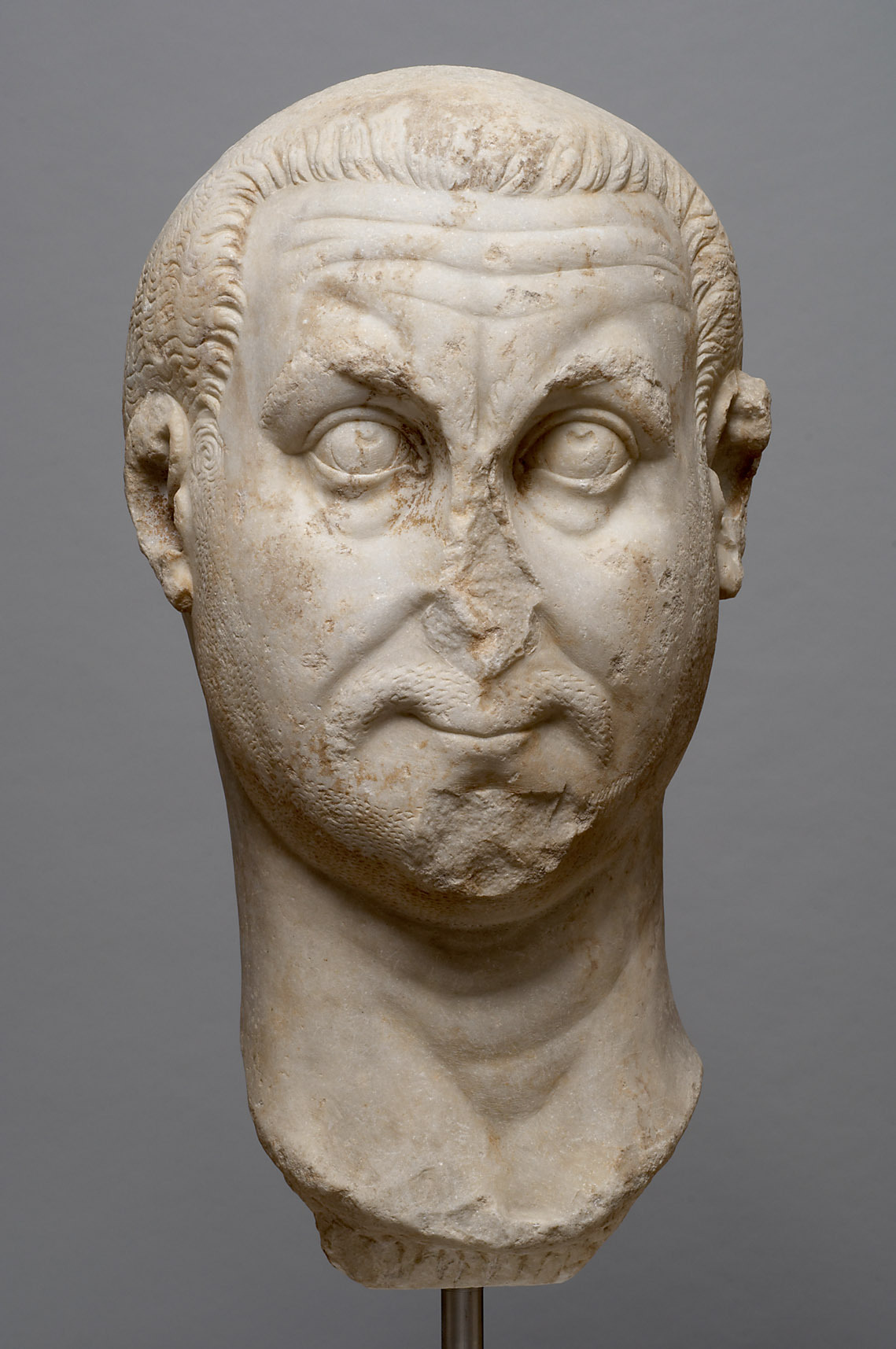
- Colossal portrait head of Licinius from the theater of Ephesus. Now in the Kunsthistorisches Museum, Vienna

Roman emperor
- Reign: 11 November 308 – 19 September 324
- Predecessor: Severus II
- Successor: Constantine I (alone)
- Alongside: Galerius (East, 308–311); Constantine I (West, 308–324); Maximinus Daza (311–313); Valerius Valens (316–317); Martinianus (324)
- Born: Licinius Licinianus (?) c. 265; Moesia Superior, Roman Empire
- Died: Spring of 325 (aged around 60); Thessalonica
- Spouse: Flavia Julia Constantia
- Issue: Licinius II
Names
- Valerius Licinianus Licinius
- Religion: Ancient Roman religion

Valerius Licinianus Licinius (/lɪˈsɪniəs/; Latin: Licinius; Greek: Λικίνιος; c. 265 – 325) was Roman emperor from 308 to 324. For most of his reign, he was the colleague and rival of Constantine I, with whom he co-authored the Edict of Milan that granted official toleration to Christians in the Roman Empire. He was finally defeated at the Battle of Chrysopolis (AD 324), and was later executed on the orders of Constantine.

== Early reign ==
Born to a Dacian peasant family in Moesia Superior, Licinius accompanied his close friend and emperor Galerius, on the Persian expedition in 298. He was trusted enough by Galerius that in 307 he was sent as an envoy to Italy, to attempt to reach some sort of agreement with the usurper Maxentius. When Galerius went to deal with Maxentius personally after the death of Severus II, he left the eastern provinces in Licinius's care.

Upon his return to the east Galerius elevated Licinius to the rank of Augustus in the West on 11 November 308, and under his immediate command were the Balkan provinces of Illyricum, Thrace and Pannonia. In 310 he took command of the war against the Sarmatians, inflicting a severe defeat on them. On the death of Galerius in May 311, Licinius entered into an agreement with Maximinus Daza to share the eastern provinces between them. By this point, not only was Licinius the official Augustus of the west but he also possessed part of the eastern provinces as well, as the Hellespont and the Bosporus became the dividing line, with Licinius taking the European provinces and Maximinus taking the Asian.

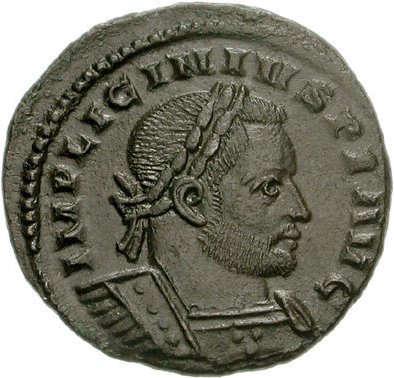
Follis minted at Londinium, c. 311. Legend: imp licinius p f aug.

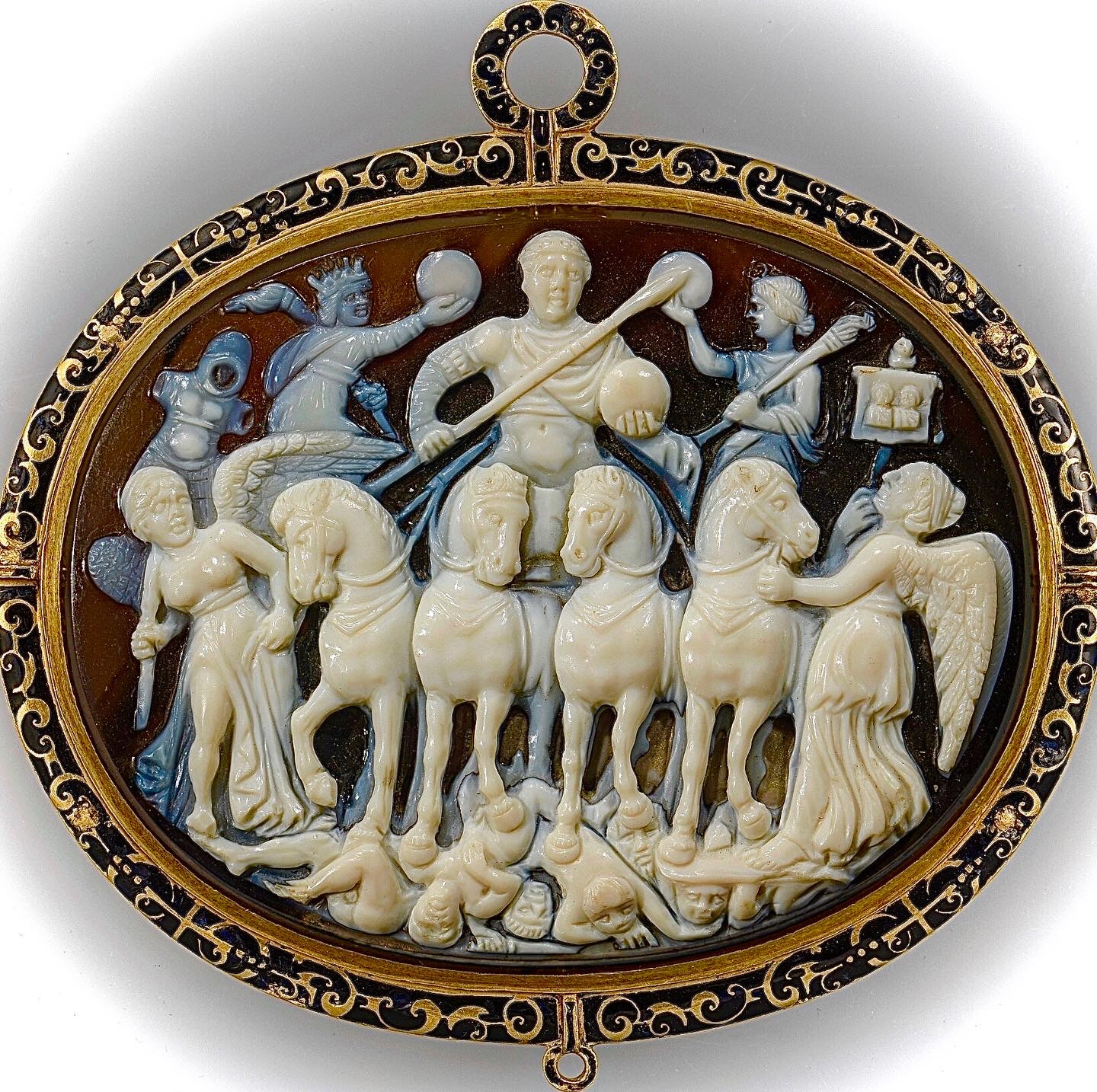
Triumph of Licinius on a cameo in the BnF Museum.

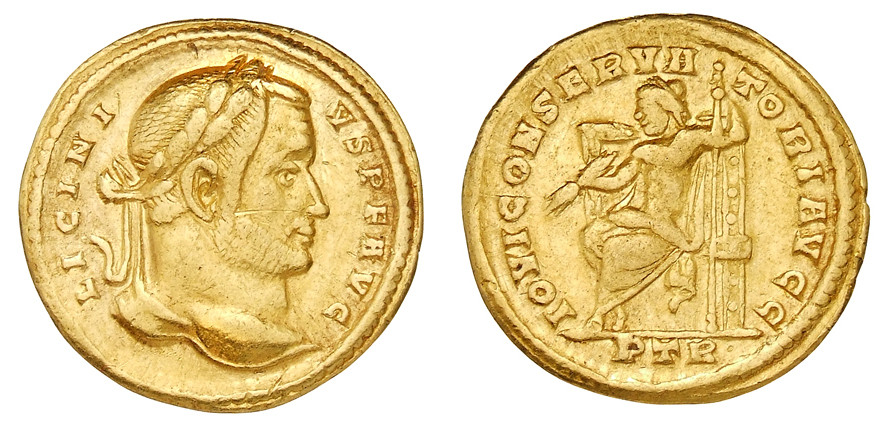
Solidus minted at Trier, c. 310–313. Obverse legend: licini-us p f aug.

To counter Maxentius, Licinius and Constantine I entered into an agreement. In response to the pact, Maximinus Daza entered into an alliance with Maxentius. However, Constantine defeated and killed Maxentius at the Battle of the Milvian Bridge in October 312. Following this victory, Licinius and Constantine decided to recognize each other as supreme emperors: Licinius became Augustus in the East, while Constantine became Augustus in the West.

In March of 313, Licinius traveled to Mediolanum (now Milan) to meet Constantine and marry his half-sister, Flavia Julia Constantia; they had a son, Licinius the Younger, in 315. Their marriage was the occasion for the jointly-issued "Edict of Milan" that reissued Galerius's previous edict allowing Christianity (and any religion one might choose) to be professed in the Empire, with additional dispositions that restored confiscated properties to Christian congregations and exempted Christian clergy from municipal civic duties.

Taking advantage of Licinius's absence in Milan, Maximinus Daza decided to attack. Leaving Syria with 70,000 men, he reached Bithynia, although the harsh weather he encountered along the way had gravely weakened his army. In April 313, he crossed the Bosporus and went to Byzantium, which was held by Licinius's troops. Undeterred, he took the town after an eleven-day siege. He moved to Heraclea, which he captured after a short siege, before moving his forces to the first posting station. With a much smaller body of men, possibly around 30,000, Licinius hurried back from Italy and arrived at Adrianople while Daza was still besieging Heraclea. Before the decisive engagement, Licinius allegedly had a vision in which an angel recited him a generic prayer that could be adopted by all cults which Licinius then repeated to his soldiers. On 30 April 313, the two armies clashed at the Battle of Tzirallum, and Daza's forces were crushed. Daza escaped, disguised as a slave, and fled to Nicomedia, where he fortified the area around the Cilician Gates. Licinius's army broke through and Daza retreated to Tarsus, where Licinius continued to press him on land and sea. The war between them ended with Daza's death in August 313.

Following Maximinus's defeat, the religious edict agreed upon in Milan was officially promulgated in the East. The redaction of the edict as reproduced by Lactantius – who follows the text affixed by Licinius in Nicomedia on 14 June 313 – uses neutral language, expressing a will to propitiate "any Divinity whatsoever in the seat of the heavens". Licinius then consolidated his power by hunting down and killing several relatives of the Tetrarchs: Daza's wife and two children; Severus's son Flavius Severianus; Galerius's son Candidianus; Diocletian's wife Prisca; and Galeria Valeria, daughter of Diocletian and wife of Galerius.

== Conflict with Constantine I ==
In 316, a civil war erupted between Licinius and Constantine, in which Constantine used the pretext that Licinius was harbouring Senecio, whom Constantine accused of plotting to overthrow him. Constantine prevailed at the Battle of Cibalae in Pannonia (8 October 316). Licinius rebuilt his army with the help of Valerius Valens, who was made co-emperor with the intention that he should eventually replace Constantine. The rivals met again on the plains of Thrace in late 316 or early 317, and Licinius suffered a humiliating defeat in the ensuing Battle of Mardia (also known as the Battle of Campus Ardiensis). The two emperors were reconciled after these two battles and Licinius had his co-emperor Valens killed.

Over the next seven years, the two imperial colleagues maintained an uneasy truce. Licinius kept himself busy with a campaign against the Sarmatians in 318, but tensions rose again in 321 when Constantine pursued a band of Sarmatians, who had been ravaging territory in his realm, across the Danube into what was technically Licinius's territory. When Constantine did the same again — this time pursuing Goths who were pillaging Thrace under their leader Rausimod — Licinius complained that he had broken the treaty between them.

Constantine wasted no time going on the offensive. Licinius's fleet of 350 ships was defeated by Constantine's fleet in 323. Then in 324, Constantine, tempted by the "advanced age and unpopular vices" of his colleague, again declared war against him and having defeated his army of 165,000 men at the Battle of Adrianople (3 July 324), succeeded in shutting him up within the walls of Byzantium. The defeat of the superior fleet of Licinius in the Battle of the Hellespont by Crispus, Constantine's eldest son and Caesar, compelled his withdrawal to Bithynia, where a last stand was made; the Battle of Chrysopolis, near Chalcedon (18 September), resulted in Licinius's final submission. In this conflict Licinius was supported by the Gothic prince Alica. Due to the intervention of Flavia Julia Constantia, Constantine's sister and also Licinius's wife, both Licinius and his co-emperor Martinian were initially spared, Licinius being imprisoned in Thessalonica, Martinian in Cappadocia; however, both former emperors were subsequently executed. After his defeat, Licinius attempted to regain power with Gothic support, but his plans were exposed, and he was sentenced to death. While attempting to flee to the Goths, Licinius was apprehended at Thessalonica. Constantine had him hanged, accusing him of conspiring to raise troops among the barbarians.

== Character and legacy ==
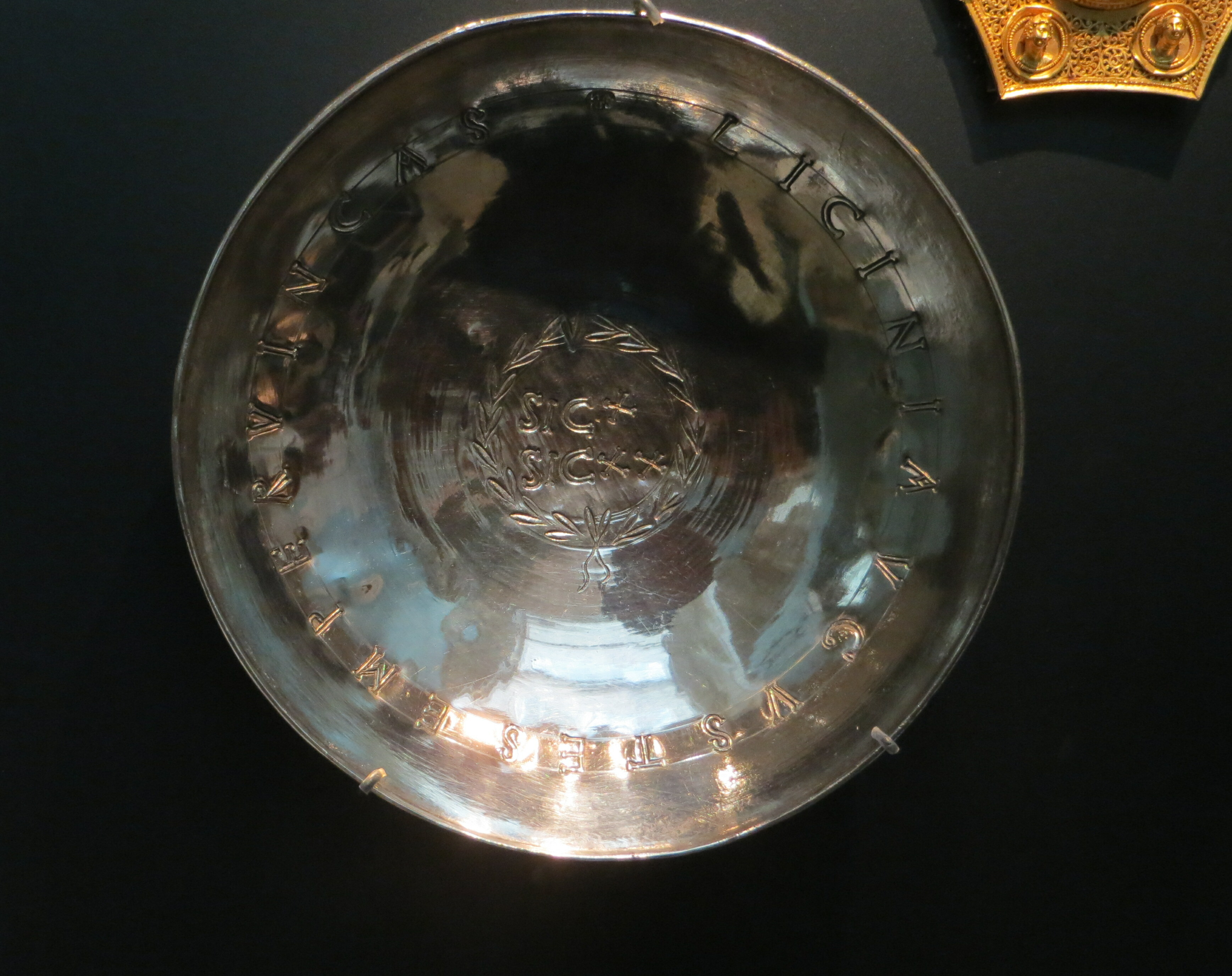
One of a hoard of five or six identical silver plates celebrating Licinius's 10th anniversary as Emperor, discovered in Niš, Serbia, and now in the British Museum in London

As part of Constantine's attempts to decrease Licinius's popularity, he actively portrayed his brother-in-law as a pagan supporter. This characterisation may be inaccurate; contemporary evidence suggests that Licinius was, at least for a period, a committed supporter of Christians. He co-authored the Edict of Milan which ended the Great Persecution, and re-affirmed the rights of Christians in his half of the empire. He also adopted Christian symbols for his armies and attempted to regulate the affairs of the Church hierarchy, much as Constantine and his successors would later do. His wife was a devout Christian.

It is possible that he converted. However, Eusebius of Caesarea, writing under the rule of Constantine, charges him with expelling Christians from the Palace and ordering military sacrifices to pagan gods, as well as interfering with the Church's internal procedures and organization. It has been theorized that he originally supported Christians along with Constantine, but later in his life turned against them and to paganism. He has also been traditionally credited for ordering the execution of the Forty Martyrs of Sebaste c. 320. The earliest surviving description of this event comes from a homily given by Basil of Caesarea roughly 50 years later.

Finally, on Licinius's death, his memory was branded with infamy; his statues were thrown down; and by edict, all his laws and judicial proceedings during his reign were abolished. Such official erasure from the public record has come to be called damnatio memoriae.

== Family tree ==
Simplified family tree of Tetrarchs

(See also: Chronological scheme of the Tetrarchy, 286–324)

DIOCLETIAN; Iovius; Eastern Emperor; 286–305	Prisca	Afranius Hannibalianus (disputed) (Note: Timothy Barnes (New Empire, 33–34) questions the parentage of Theodora shown here. He proposes that Maximian is her natural father (and that her mother is possibly a daughter of Afranius Hannibalianus). Substituting Afranicus Hannibalianus and switching the positions of Maximian and Eutropia would produce a diagram that matches the alternative lineage.) consul 292	Eutropia	Maximian; Herculius; Western Emperor; 286–305
Unknown sister	Galerius; Eastern Emperor; 305-311	Galeria Valeria	Helena	Constantius I Western Emperor; 305–306; Constantinian Dynasty	Flavia Maximiana Theodora	Severus II; Western Emperor; 306–307
Maximinus II; Eastern Emperor; 310–313	Valeria Maximilla	Maxentius; Western Emperor; 306–312	Fausta	Constantine I Roman Emperor; 306–337	Julius Constantius consul 335	Flavia Julia Constantia	Licinius I Western then Eastern Emperor; 308–324	Martinian; Eastern Emperor; 324	Valens I Eastern Emperor; 316–317
Valerius Romulus	Constantine II; Western Emperor; 337–340	Constantius II; Emperor; 337–361	Constans I Middle then Western Emperor; 337–350	Julian II; Emperor; 361–363	Licinius II caesar

Notes:

Bibliography:

- Barnes, Timothy D. The New Empire of Diocletian and Constantine. Cambridge, MA: Harvard University Press, 1982. ISBN 0-7837-2221-4

Regnal titles
Preceded by Severus II	Roman emperor 308–324; With: Galerius, Constantine I, Maximinus, Valens and Martinianus	Succeeded by Constantine I
Political offices
Preceded by Diocletian; Galerius	Roman consul 309 with Constantine Augustus	Succeeded by Tatius Andronicus; Pompeius Probus
Preceded by Galerius; Maximinus Daza	Roman consul II; 312–313 with Constantine Augustus	Succeeded by G. Ceionius Rufius Volusianus; Petronius Annianus
Preceded by G. Ceionius Rufius Volusianus; Petronius Annianus	Roman consul III; 315 with Constantine Augustus	Succeeded by Antonius Caecina Sabinus; G. Vettius Cossinius Rufinus
Preceded by Ovinius Gallicanus; Caesonius Bassus	Roman consul IV; 318 with Crispus Caesar	Succeeded by Constantine Augustus; Licinius Caesar
Preceded by Constantine Augustus; Constantine Caesar	Roman consul V 321 with Licinius Caesar	Succeeded by Petronius Probianus; Amnius Anicius Julianus
