= Flavia Julia Constantia =

Roman empress from 313 to 324

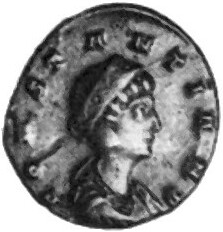
- Rare coin of Constantia as plated in RIC

Roman empress
- Tenure: 313–324 (with Fausta)
- Born: after 293
- Died: c. 330
- Spouse: Licinius
- Issue: Licinius II
Names
- Flavia Julia Constantia
- Dynasty: Constantinian
- Father: Constantius Chlorus
- Mother: Flavia Maximiana Theodora

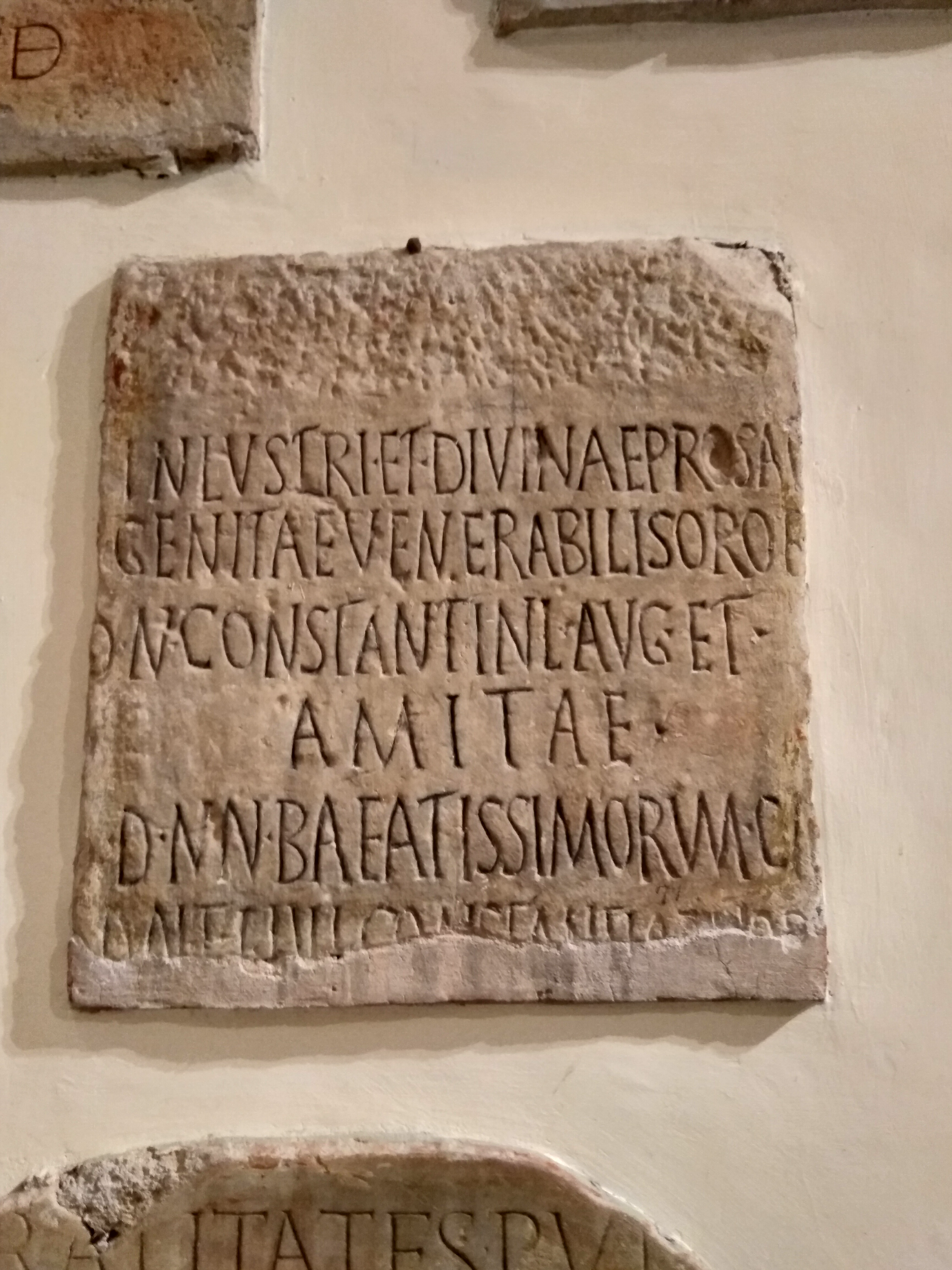
Inscription from the base of a statue erected in honor of Constantia, called most noble, sister of Constantine and aunt of the Caesars (Constantine II and Constantius II); the statue was erected between 326 and 333

Flavia Julia Constantia (Greek: Κωνσταντία; after 293 – c. 330) was a Roman empress as the wife of Licinius. She was the daughter of the Roman emperor Constantius Chlorus and his wife Flavia Maximiana Theodora, and younger half-sister of Constantine the Great.

== Biography ==
Constantia was one of six children born from the marriage of Constantius I and Theodora. Although her birth date has not been recorded, she must have been born after 293, as that was the year of her parents’ marriage. She had two sisters, Anastasia and Eutropia, and three brothers, Julius Constantius, Flavius Dalmatius and Hannibalianus. Constantius already had a son, Constantine I, from his previous relationship with Helena, making him Constantia’s half-brother.

In 313, the emperor Constantine gave her in marriage to his co-emperor Licinius, on occasion of their meeting in Mediolanum. She bore a son, Licinius II, in 315, and when the struggle between Constantine and Licinius began in 316, she stayed on her husband's side. A second war started between the two emperors in 324, ending in Licinius' defeat. Constantine initially spared his rival on Constantia's intercession, but in 325 he ordered that Licinius be killed. A second blow for Constantia was the death, also by order of Constantine, of her son Valerius.

In the following years, Constantia lived at her brother's court, receiving honours (her title was nobilissima femina). Constantia was her brother's favourite sister and proof of such favour is that he minted coins with her image and with the title "Constantia Soror Constantini AVG," or, "Constantia, Sister of Constantine Augustus" ("AVG" is an abbreviation of "Augustus," the center consonant being a "manuscript U," not a "V").

According to Philostorgius, Constantia supported the Arian party at the First Council of Nicaea (325). However, modern historians dismiss these claims as "fictions".

== Legacy ==
The city of Constanţa, Romania is named after her.

== Sources ==
- Elliott, Thomas George (1996). The Christianity of Constantine the Great. ISBN 978-0940866591.
- Martindale, John R.; Jones, A. H. M.; Morris, John, eds. (1971). The Prosopography of the Later Roman Empire: Volume I, AD 260–395. Cambridge: Cambridge University Press. ISBN 0-521-07233-6.
- Pohlsander, Hans A. (1993). "CONSTANTIA". Ancient Society. 24: 151–167. doi:10.2143/AS.24.0.2005864. JSTOR 44079527.

Royal titles
Preceded by Fausta	Empress of Rome; 313–324 with Fausta (313–324)	Succeeded by Fausta
