= Anonymus Valesianus =

Literary compilation by Henricus Valesius

Anonymus Valesianus (or Excerpta Valesiana) is the conventional title of a compilation of two fragmentary vulgar Latin chronicles, named for its modern editor, Henricus Valesius, who published the texts for the first time in 1636, together with his first printed edition of the Res Gestae of Ammianus Marcellinus. The two fragments are not related, one being from the fourth century and the other from the sixth. The only connection between the two fragments is their presence in the same manuscript and their history of being edited together. When Henricus' brother Hadrian re-edited the Anonymus in an edition of Ammianus Marcellinus in 1681, it was the first time that the two excerpts were clearly separated.

The work of the Anonymus Valesianus is a debated issue of historiography for more than one hundred years, all the more so as both the identity of the authors and the circumstances of the compilation of the work are obscure.

== Manuscripts ==
The texts exist only in a single ninth-century manuscript kept in Berlin. When the manuscript turned up in the Jesuit Collège de Clermont in Paris in the form of a parchment bundle of 34 flimsy sheets in nine different hands, it was re-ordered according to the hands and re-bound. The collection appeared in the catalogue of the Jesuit college at the occasion of the sale of the library by auction in 1764. The collection was bought by a certain Johannes Meermann and transferred to the Hague (becoming Codex Meermannus 794). Following the death of Meermann, the collection passed to an English collector, Sir Thomas Phillipps (Codex Phillippsianus 1885). Later, through the heirs, it was taken by the German State Library in Berlin in 1887 where it is accessible today under the shelfmark Ms. Phill. 1885.

The Anonymus Valesianus II was used in a compilation of excerpts in Vat. Pal. lat. 927. This does not derive directly from the Berlin manuscript.

== Excerpts ==
=== Anonymus Valesianus I ===
Anonymus Valesianus I (or Excerptum Valesianum I), sometimes given the separate conventional title Origo Constantini Imperatoris ("The Lineage of the Emperor Constantine") possibly dates from around 390, and is generally regarded as providing a reliable source. The beginning of Origo already looks like the final sentence of an account on the rule of Diocletian and Maximian. In 1963 Arnaldo Momigliano summarized the results of scholarship on Origo Constantini in the words that "All is in doubt about the first part of the Anonymus Valesianus". There are questions left, with regard to the date of Origo's editions, sources, and revisions, which have not yet found convincing answers.

=== Anonymus Valesianus II ===
Anonymus Valesianus II (or Excerptum Valesianum II), sometimes referred to as the Pars Posterior, written after 526 and probably between 540 and 550. The text is headed item ex libris chronicorum inter cetera, implying either that it was excerpted from several chronicles or from a chronicle entitled Libri chronicorum (or perhaps a Chronica in several books). The text mostly deals with the reign of the Ostrogothic king Theodoric the Great. It is sometimes called the Chronica Theodericana.

The identity of the author and the circumstances of the compilation of the Pars Posterior is obscure, however a few scholars think it "based on a no longer extant chronicle by the bishop of Ravenna, Maximianus".

The Pars Posterior consists of 60 chapters and it presents the chain of events as a chronicle from Chapter 36 to 59: from the rule of Emperor Zeno, through the decline of the power of Odoacer, up to the succession of Theodoric the Great in 493. In the next section, from Chapter 60 to 79, the description of the rule of Theodoric the Great – the Italian ruler of Germanic origin – can be found. Besides the description of political events the author dwells on portraying the major virtues of the ruler through different narratives. In the closing section (Chapter 80 to 96) the author describes the tragic years of Theodoric's rule.

The work was used by Edward Gibbon as a major source for the Roman perspective on the Ostrogothic period in his History of the Decline and Fall of the Roman Empire.
