= Battle of the Hellespont =

Ancient naval battle

Coordinates: 40.2000°N 26.4000°E

- Part of the civil wars of the Tetrarchy
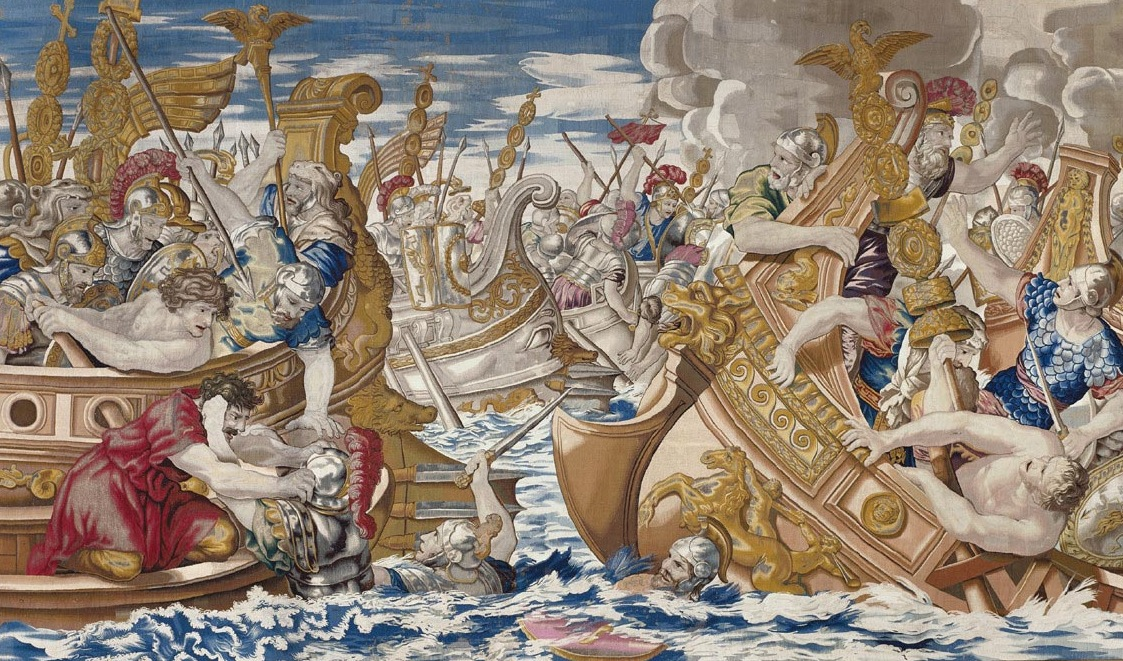
- The Battle of the Hellespont, depicted on a tapestry by Pietro da Cortona (c. 1635).
Date	July 324 AD
Location	the Hellespont (Dardanelles) (modern-day Turkey)
Result	Constantinian victory

Belligerents
Constantinian fleet	Licinian fleet

Commanders and leaders
Crispus	Abantus

Strength
200 ships	350 ships

The Battle of the Hellespont, consisting of two separate naval clashes, was fought in 324 between a Constantinian fleet, led by the eldest son of Constantine I, Crispus; and a larger fleet under Licinius' admiral, Abantus (or Amandus). Despite being outnumbered, Crispus won a very complete victory.

== Background ==
Following his defeat at Adrianople, in Thrace, Licinius and his main army fell back to the city of Byzantium. Licinius left a strong garrison in Byzantium but ferried the greater part of his troops across the Bosphorus to the Asian shore. To maintain his force in Byzantium, and to secure his line of communication between Asia Minor and the city, retaining control of the narrow waters separating Thrace from Bithynia and Mysia now became imperative for Licinius. Constantine, if he wished to cross to Asia in order to destroy Licinius' means of further resistance, had to gain control of the sea crossings. Licinius' main army was on the Bosphoros to cover this crossing point whilst the bulk of his navy was moved to cover the Hellespontine narrows. He also assembled a second military force, under his newly elevated co-emperor Martinian, at Lampsacus (Lapseki) on the Asian shore of the Hellespont.

== Battle ==
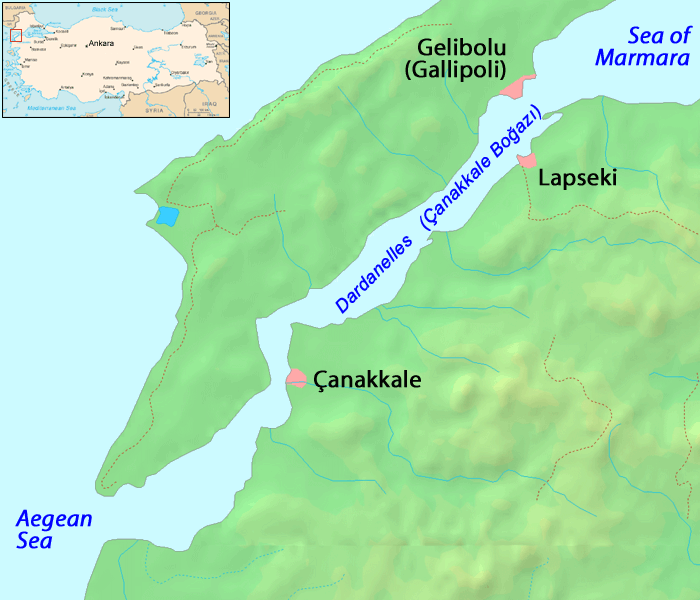
The Hellespont (Dardanelles)

While Constantine was directing the siege of Byzantium, Crispus led a force of 80 vessels into the Hellespont. Abantus opposed him with a superior fleet of 200 ships. However, the size of the Licinian forces worked against them within the confined waters of the strait. Crispus was able to use his more compact squadrons to outmanoeuvre his opponent's unwieldy armada and sink many of the Licinian warships.

Abantus then withdrew to the eastern end of the Hellespont to regroup his forces. Crispus augmented his fleet with reinforcements brought in from the Aegean Sea and the two fleets met again on the following day. The second clash was fought near Gallipoli; a storm blew up which, fortuitously for Crispus, wrecked many of the Licinian vessels on the shore. Abantus' ship was sunk and he only managed to save himself by swimming ashore. All but four of the ships of the Licinian fleet were wrecked, sunk, or captured. The Constantinian fleet won an overwhelming victory.

== Aftermath ==
This naval victory allowed Constantine to move his army across to Asia Minor, using a fleet of light transports to avoid Martinian's forces. Once Licinius knew of the destruction of his navy, he withdrew his forces from Byzantium. Constantine's army then defeated Licinius' at the Battle of Chrysopolis; this victory was the final battle in the conflict, Licinius surrendered himself following the battle. Constantine consequently became the sole master of the Roman Empire.

== Bibliography ==
- Grant, Michael (1985), The Roman Emperors: A biographical Guide to the Rulers of Imperial Rome 31 BC-AD 476, London. ISBN 0-297-78555-9
- Lieu, S.N.C and Montserrat, D. (Ed.s) (1996), From Constantine to Julian, London. ISBN 0-415-09336-8
- Odahl, C.M., (2004) Constantine and the Christian Empire, Routledge 2004. ISBN 0-415-17485-6
