= Crispus =

Roman caesar from 317 to 326

- Caesar (1 March 317 - 326)
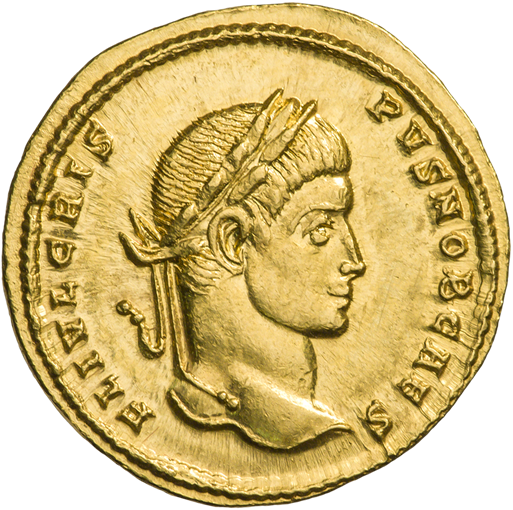
- Solidus of Crispus marked: fl· iul· crispus nob· caes·
- Born: c. 300; Pola, Istria
- Died: 326 AD (aged c. 26); Pola, Istria
- Spouse: Helena
- Issue: Flavius
Names
- Flavius Julius Crispus
- Dynasty: Constantinian
- Father: Constantine I
- Mother: Minervina
- Religion: Greco-Roman religion

Flavius Julius Crispus (/ˈkrɪspəs/; c. 300 – 326) was the eldest son of the Roman emperor Constantine I, as well as his junior colleague (caesar) from March 317 until his execution by his father in 326. The grandson of the augustus Constantius I, Crispus was the elder half-brother of the future augustus Constantine II and became co-caesar with him and with his cousin Licinius II at Serdica, part of the settlement ending the Cibalensean War between Constantine and his father's rival Licinius I. Crispus ruled from Augusta Treverorum (Trier) in Roman Gaul between 318 and 323 and defeated the navy of Licinius I at the Battle of the Hellespont in 324, which with the land Battle of Chrysopolis won by Constantine forced the resignation of Licinius and his son, leaving Constantine the sole augustus and the Constantinian dynasty in control of the entire empire. It is unclear what the legal status was of the relationship between Crispus's mother Minervina and Constantine; Crispus may have been an illegitimate son.

Crispus's tutor in rhetoric was the Late Latin historian of Early Christianity Lactantius. After his elevation to imperial rank, at which point he was also entitled princeps iuventutis ("Prince of Youth"), the Latin rhetorician Nazarius composed a panegyric preserved in the Panegyrici Latini, which honoured Crispus's military victories over the Franks in c. 319. Crispus was three times Roman consul, for the years 318, 321, and 324.

According to the Latin histories of Ammianus Marcellinus and Aurelius Victor, after a trial whose real circumstances are mysterious, Constantine executed Crispus at Pola (Pula) in 326. His stepmother Fausta was also put to death, and the Late Greek historian Zosimus and the Byzantine Greek writer Joannes Zonaras wrote that Constantine had accused Crispus of incest with her. After his death, Crispus was subjected to damnatio memoriae.

== Early life ==
While Crispus’ year of birth is nowhere outright stated, he must have been born before 307. In that year, his father Constantine was married to Maximian’s daughter Fausta, so his mother Minervina was either dead or had been set aside.

Constantine entrusted his eldest son’s education to Lactantius, one of the most important Christian teachers of that time.

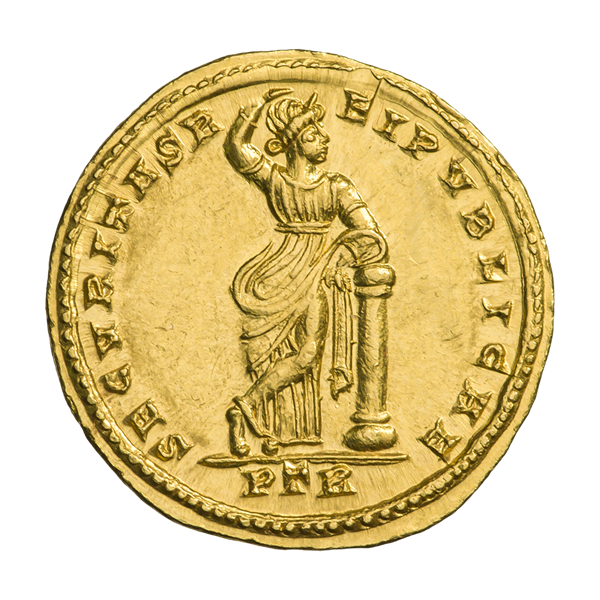
Reverse of a solidus of Crispus, marked: SECVRITAS REI PVBLICAE ("the security of the State")

== Career ==
By 313, there were two remaining augusti in control of the Roman Empire—Constantine in the west and his brother-in-law Licinius in the east. On 1 March 317, the two co-reigning augusti jointly proclaimed three new caesares: Crispus, alongside his younger half-brother Constantine II, and his first cousin Licinius Junior. Constantine appointed Crispus as Commander of Gaul. The new caesar soon held residence in Augusta Treverorum (modern Trier), regional capital of Germania.

By October 322, Crispus was already married to a woman named Helena, as she had a child with him, a son Flavius, in that month. The Codex Theodosianus recorded Constantine’s celebration of the event.

Crispus was leader in victorious military operations against the Franks and the Alamanni in 318, 320 and 323. Thus he secured the continued Roman presence in the areas of Gaul and Germania. The soldiers adored him thanks to his strategic abilities and the victories to which he had led the Roman legions.

Crispus spent the following years assisting Constantine in the war against by then hostile Licinius. In 324, Constantine appointed Crispus as the commander of his fleet which left the port of Piraeus to confront Licinius' fleet. The subsequent Battle of the Hellespont was fought at the straits of Bosporus. The 200 ships under the command of Crispus managed to decisively defeat the enemy forces, which were at least double in number. Thus Crispus achieved his most important and difficult victory which further established his reputation as a brilliant general.

Following his navy activities, Crispus was assigned part of the legions loyal to his father. The other part was commanded by Constantine himself. Crispus led the legions assigned to him in another victorious battle outside Chrysopolis against the armies of Licinius.

The two victories were his contribution to the final triumph of his father over Licinius. Constantine was the only augustus left in the Empire. He honoured his son for his support and success by depicting his face in imperial coins, statues, mosaics, cameos, etc. Eusebius of Caesaria wrote for Crispus that he is "an Imperator most dear to God and in all regards comparable to his father,” going as far as to compare their relationship to God the Father and God the Son.

== Execution ==
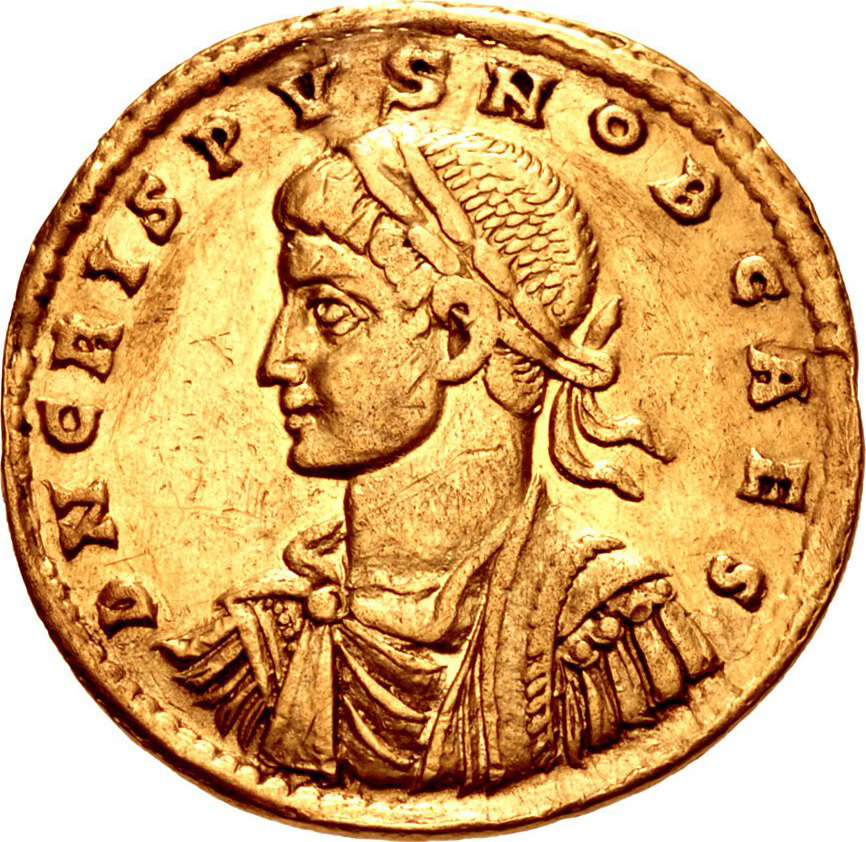
Obverse of a solidus marked: dn··crispvs·nob·caes·

In 326, Crispus' life came to a sudden end. On his father's orders he was executed, apparently without trial, at Pola, Istria, in the Augustan regio of Venetia et Histria. According to Sidonius Apollinaris and Gregory of Tours, Crispus died through poison. Soon afterwards, Constantine had his wife Fausta killed also, according to several sources in a hot bath or bathroom. Both Crispus and Fausta suffered damnatio memoriae, their names being erased from inscriptions.

The reason for these deaths remain unclear. The accounts of Zosimus and Zonaras say that Crispus was executed due to suspicions that he was involved in an illicit relationship with Fausta, but some scholars have been skeptical of this explanation. For instance, T. D. Barnes argues that as Crispus was based at Trier, and Fausta at Constantinople, they would not have had the opportunity to have an affair. While Hans Pohlsander considers Barnes’ argument to be invalid on the basis that Crispus was in the East for long enough, he suggests that the similarity of Zosimus' story to the myth of Phaedra and Hippolytus makes its veracity doubtful. He does, however, note that Constantine passed multiple laws on adultery in the same year, which may have been related to the deaths of Crispus and Fausta. On the other hand, David Woods accepts the belief that the two were thought to have had a relationship, while suggesting that they were not actually executed. According to his theory, Crispus was exiled to Pola as a punishment for his adultery and committed suicide by poison there, and Fausta's death was caused by an attempt to induce abortion to get rid of an unwanted pregnancy that resulted from her affair.

Pohlsander observed that Crispus “must have committed, or at least must have been suspected of having committed, some especially shocking offense to earn him a sentence of death from his own father.” J. W. Drijvers concludes that the true explanation will never be known.

== In literature ==
Crispus became a popular tragic hero after the success of Bernardino Stefonio's neo-Latin tragedy Crispus, which was performed at the Jesuit Collegio Romano in 1597. Closely modelled on Seneca's Phaedra, this became a model of Jesuit tragedy and one of the main bases for Alessandro Donati's 1631 Ars poetica Alexandri Donati Senensis e Societate Iesu and Tarquinio Galluzzi's 1633 Defense of Crispus. The play was adapted for the French stage by François de Grenaille as L'Innocent malhereux (1639) and by Tristan l'Hermite as La Morte de Chrispe ou les maleurs du grand Constantine (1645). It was performed as an opera in Rome (1720) and London (1721), where it was entitled, Crispo: drama, not to mention Donizetti's 1832 opera Fausta. The story is also retold and embellished in chapter 31 of Sir Walter Scott's novel Count Robert of Paris. When Evelyn Waugh reworks the story in his novel Helena (1950), Crispus is innocent.

Political offices
Preceded by Ovinius Gallicanus; Caesonius Bassus	Roman consul 318 with Licinius Augustus V	Succeeded by Constantine Augustus V Licinius Caesar
Preceded by Constantine Augustus VI; Constantine Caesar	Roman consul 321 with Constantine Caesar II	Succeeded by Petronius Probianus; Amnius Anicius Julianus
Preceded by Acilius Severus; Vettius Rufinus	Roman consul 324 with Constantine Caesar III	Succeeded by Sex. Anicius Paulinus; Valerius Proculus
