= 310 =

310 in various calendars
- Gregorian calendar: 310; CCCX
- Ab urbe condita: 1063
- Assyrian calendar: 5060
- Balinese saka calendar: 231–232
- Bengali calendar: −284 – −283
- Berber calendar: 1260
- Buddhist calendar: 854
- Burmese calendar: −328
- Byzantine calendar: 5818–5819
- Chinese calendar: 己巳年 (Earth Snake); 3007 or 2800 — to — 庚午年 (Metal Horse); 3008 or 2801
- Coptic calendar: 26–27
- Discordian calendar: 1476
- Ethiopian calendar: 302–303
- Hebrew calendar: 4070–4071
- Hindu calendars
- Vikram Samvat: 366–367
- Shaka Samvat: 231–232
- Kali Yuga: 3410–3411
- Holocene calendar: 10310
- Iranian calendar: 312 BP – 311 BP
- Islamic calendar: 322 BH – 321 BH
- Javanese calendar: 190–191
- Julian calendar: 310; CCCX
- Korean calendar: 2643
- Minguo calendar: 1602 before ROC 民前1602年
- Nanakshahi calendar: −1158
- Seleucid era: 621/622 AG
- Thai solar calendar: 852–853
- Tibetan calendar: ས་མོ་སྦྲུལ་ལོ་ (female Earth-Snake); 436 or 55 or −717 — to — ལྕགས་ཕོ་རྟ་ལོ་ (male Iron-Horse); 437 or 56 or −716

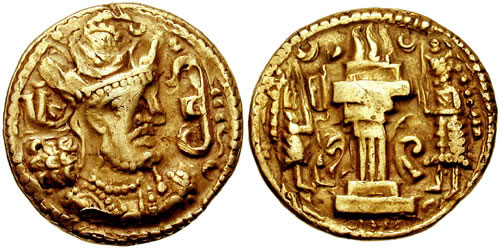
King Shapur II the Great

Year 310 (CCCX) was a common year starting on Sunday of the Julian calendar. At the time, it was known as the Year of the Consulship of Andronicus and Probus (or, less frequently, year 1063 Ab urbe condita). The denomination 310 for this year has been used since the early medieval period, when the Anno Domini calendar era became the prevalent method in Europe for naming years.

== Events ==
=== By place ===
==== Roman Empire ====
- Maximian, retired emperor, rebels against Constantine I in Arles while the latter is campaigning against the Franks.
- Maximinus Daza, caesar under Emperor Galerius, is acclaimed augustus by his troops. Galerius is forced to recognize him as co-ruler of the East. The Roman Empire is thus divided between seven simultaneous emperors: Galerius (East), Maximinus II (East), Licinius (Middle), Constantine I (West), Maximian (West), Maxentius (Italy), and Domitius Alexander (Africa).
- July – Maximian flees to Marseille where he is besieged and surrenders. Constantine encourages his suicide and Maximian, age 60, hangs himself. Emperor Maxentius condemns the killing of his father.
- Licinius campaigns with success against the Carpi.

==== Asia ====
- Haelhae becomes the king of the Korean kingdom of Silla.

=== By topic ===
==== Commerce ====
- At Trier, Constantine orders the minting of a new coin, the solidus, in an effort to offset the declining value of the denarius and bring stability to the imperial currency by restoring a gold standard. The solidus (later known as the bezant) will be minted in the Byzantine Empire without change in weight or purity until the 10th century.

==== Religion ====
- April 18 – Pope Eusebius succeeds Pope Marcellus I as the 31st pope, but is banished on August 17 by the Emperor Maxentius to Sicily, where he dies, perhaps from a hunger strike.

== Births ==
- Ausonius, Roman poet and rhetorician (d. 395)
- Epiphanius of Salamis, Church Father (d. 403)
- Wulfila, Gothic bishop and missionary (d. 383)

== Deaths ==
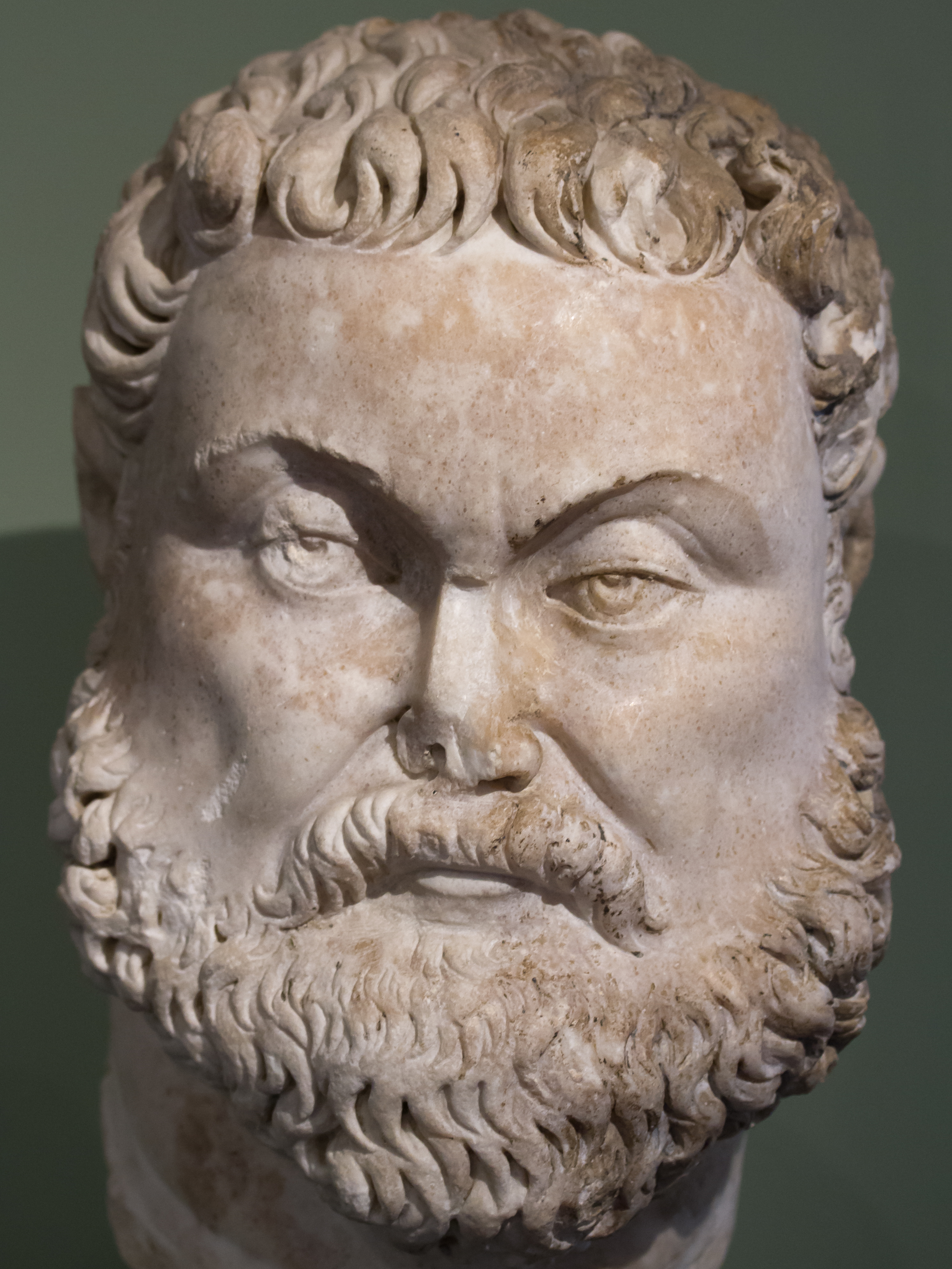
Emperor Maximian

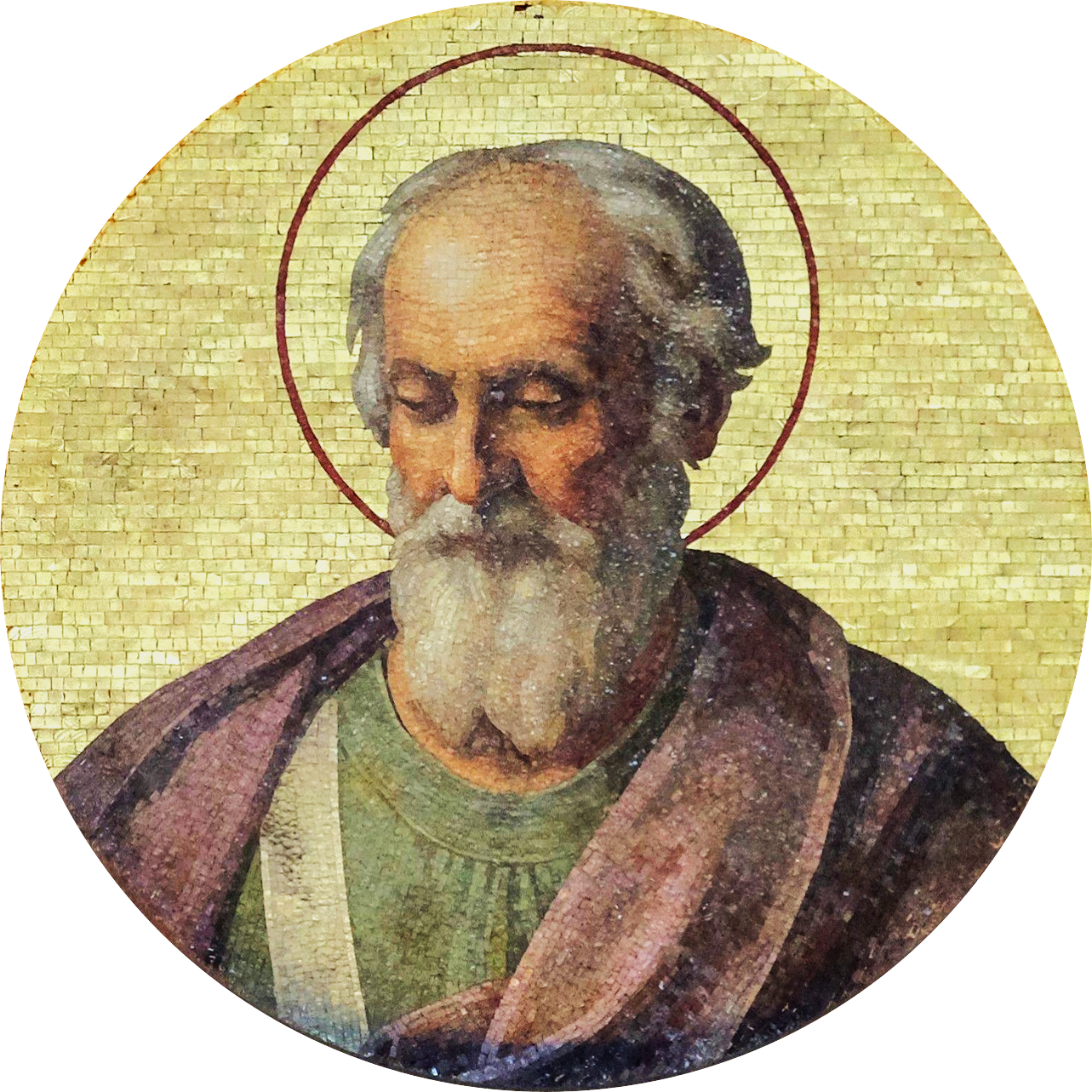
Pope Eusebius

- August 17 – Eusebius, bishop of Rome
- July – Maximian, Roman emperor (b. c. 250)
- Dan, Chinese empress of Xiongnu (or Han-Zhao)
- Domnina, Berenice, and Prosdoce, Christian martyrs
- Liu He, Chinese emperor of Xiongnu (or Han-Zhao)
- Liu Yuan, Chinese emperor of Xiongnu (or Han-Zhao)
- Luo Shang, Chinese general of the Jin dynasty (266–420)
- Emperor Ōjin of Japan, according to legend.
