= Villa of Maxentius =

Ancient Roman ruin

- Villa di Massenzio
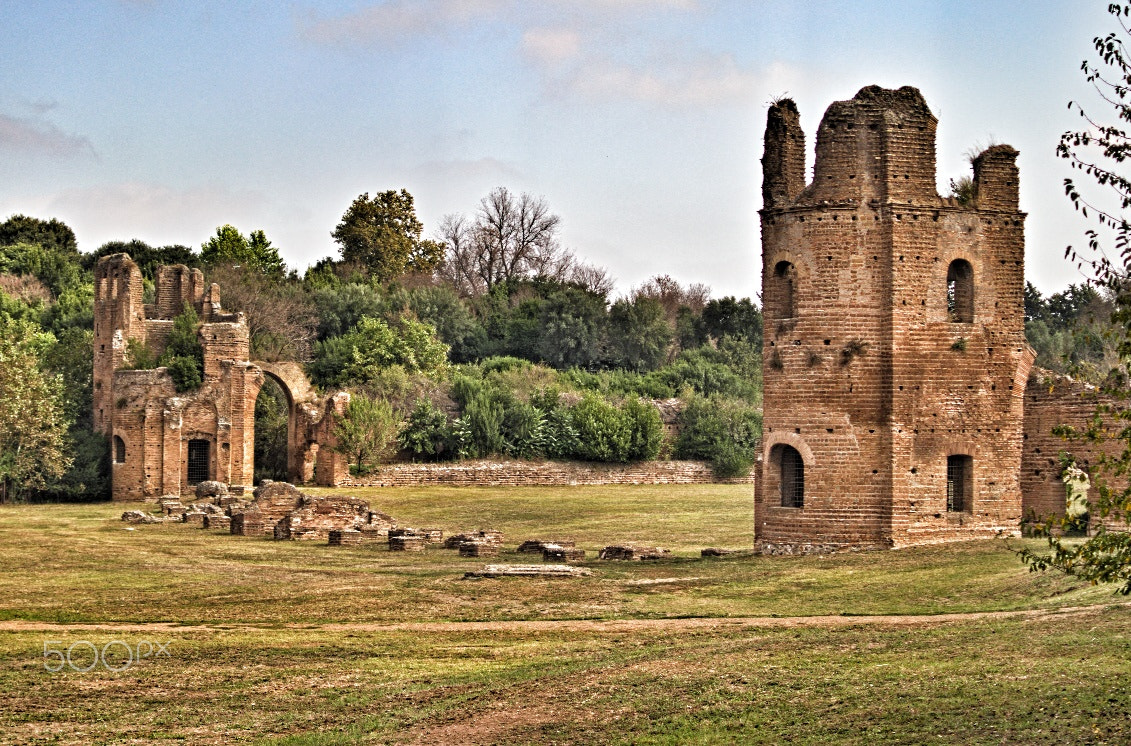
- Towers at the end of the circus
- Interactive map of Villa of Maxentius
- 41°51′20″N 12°31′10″E
- Type: Dwelling
- Periods: Roman Imperial
- Cultures: Roman
- Location: Rome, Italy
- Region: Lazio

Site notes
- Condition: Ruined
- Owner: Public
- Public access: Yes

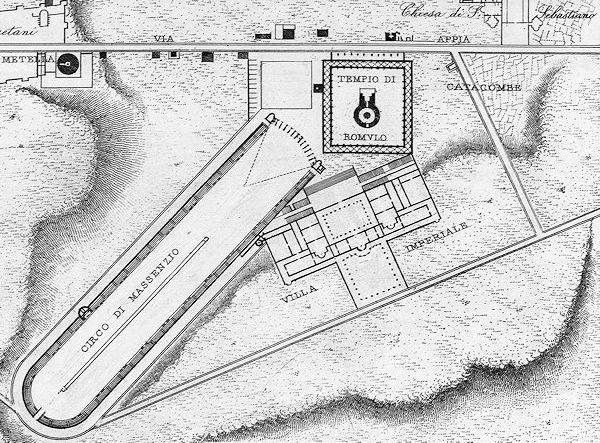
Villa of Maxentius and Mausoleum of Romulus

The Villa of Maxentius is an imperial villa in Rome, built by the Roman emperor Maxentius. The complex is located between the second and third miles of the ancient Appian Way, and consists of three main buildings: the palace, the circus of Maxentius and the dynastic mausoleum, designed in an inseparable architectural unit to honor Maxentius.

== History ==
The remains of beautiful buildings are configured as the last phase of the transformation of an original rustic republican villa (2nd century BC) built in a scenographic position on the side of a hill facing the Alban Hills.

The two nymphaeums facing the Appian Way are dated in the Julio-Claudian era, one of which, still visible and recently rebuilt, was much later attached to a farm. In the 2nd century the place underwent a radical transformation under Herodes Atticus, who incorporated it into his Pago Triopio.

The property later passed under imperial rule and it was then that, in the early 4th century, Maxentius built the villa, the circus and the family mausoleum there. In this mausoleum was where his son Valerius Romulus, dead in adolescence, was perhaps first placed.

The defeat of Maxentius by Constantine probably led to the early abandonment of the site (it is believed that the racecourse was never used by Maxentius), and the property passed to the Patrimonium Appiae (already mentioned in the time of Pope Gregory I -in the late 6th century- among the ecclesiastical heritage). The circus, called Girulum, is mentioned in a land-transaction document between ecclesiastical entities in 850.

The great estate passed to the counts of Tusculum, then to the Cenci and finally to the Mattei -to whom the first excavations are connected- in the 16th century.

== The excavations ==
In mid-18th century a new rustic building was attached to the pronaos of the mausoleum; the rest of the old complex, known then as the Circus of Caracalla, was almost completely buried, reason why in 1763 Giuseppe Vasi described it thus:

Only this Circus remains which, according to some, is the work of Galieno; a brick mass that was the main entrance, and the land cultivated around the Circus, in the middle of which was found the Egyptian obelisk that is now seen in the most noble source of Piazza Navona.

— Giuseppe Vassi

The obelisk mentioned is the Agonalis Obelisk, integrated into the Fountain of the Four Rivers in Piazza Navona.

Shortly thereafter, in 1825, the property was acquired by Giovanni Torlonia, who twenty years earlier had already purchased the property of Roma Vecchia and his marquisate. It was then that Torlonia commissioned the first systematic excavations, although suggested, in the forms and in the completion, by Antonio Nibby. After eight months of hard excavation (in a field, Nibby pointed out in his dissertation, "bad and so hard that the tuff itself would have seemed softer") the circus had completely resurfaced to the Puerta del Triunfo on the street called Asinaria. And near that door two inscriptions were found, one of which indicated Maxentius as promoter of, and his son Romulus as the one who dedicated, the monument. On describing the excavation, Nibby meticulously observed the mediocre quality of the inscription walls and marble slabs, which therefore dated back to the 4th century. It also pointed out that the building had never been restored in ancient times. The Torlonia family continued to excavate throughout the 19th century (1877, 1883).

The archaeological complex was finally expropriated by the Municipality of Rome in 1943; in 1960, during the Rome Olympic Games, the entire circus was excavated, as well as the consolidation of the perimeter walls, followed by the partial excavation of the palace buildings, the restoration of the spina or euripus, the quadriporticus and the mausoleum. Several other excavation and consolidation campaigns have followed since then, in 1975–77, 1979 and in the early 2000s.

Since 2008, the Villa of Maxentius has been part of the Municipal Museums system. Since December 2012, the site is part of the Aperti per Voi (Open for you) project of the Italian Touring Club, where dozens of volunteers take turns to receive visitors, whose number is constantly growing also thanks to the free access that came into force at end of August 2014.

== The complex ==
The best known monument in the entire complex is the Circus of Maxentius, the only one of the Roman circuses still well preserved in all its architectural components.

The dynastic mausoleum, also known as the Tomb of Romulus by the name of Valerius Romulus, a young son of the emperor who was presumably buried here, is located inside a four-sided portico aligned with the ancient Appian Way.

Access to the site also allows access to the nearby Tomb of Caecilia Metella.

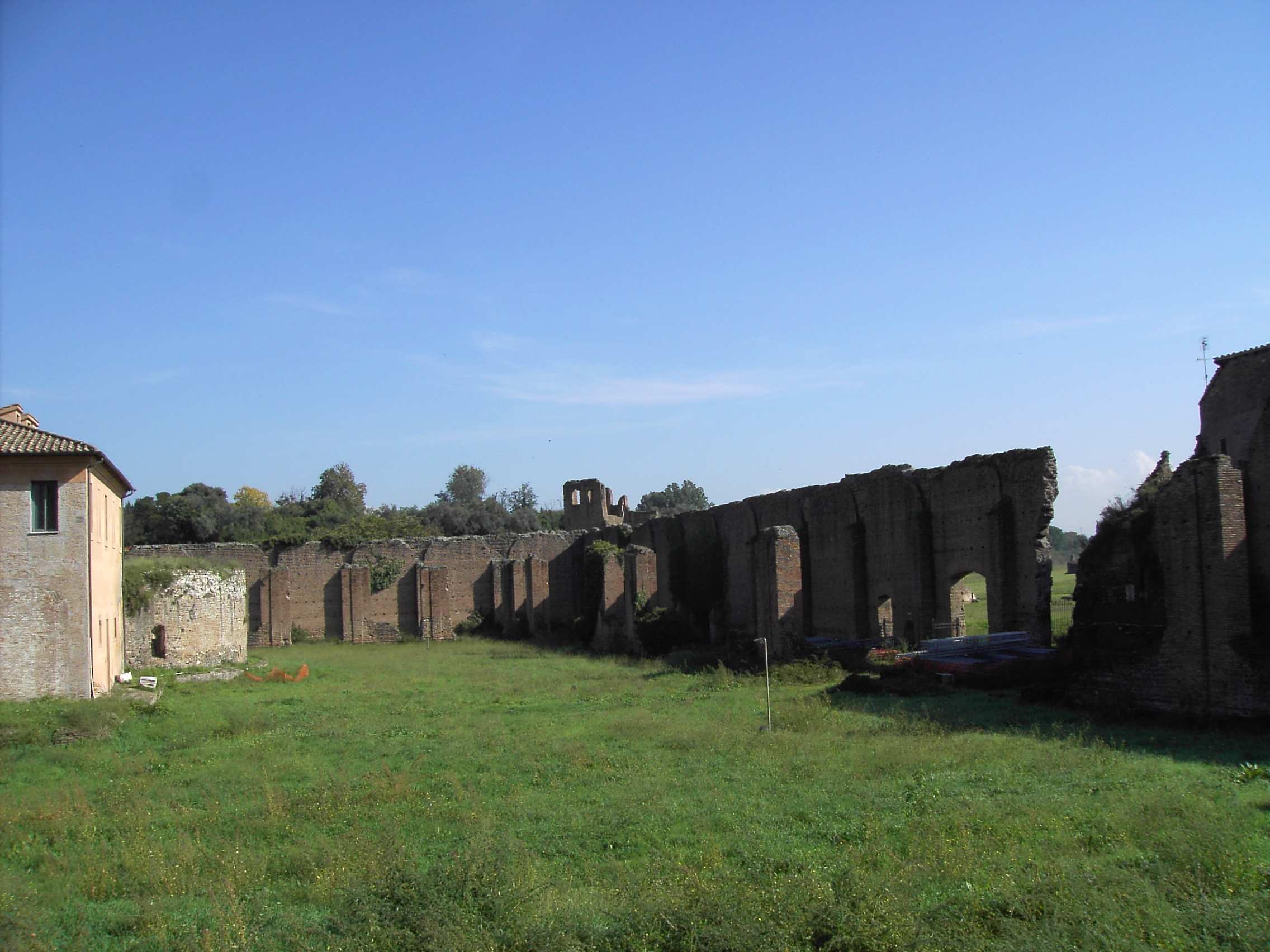
Remains of the tomb of Romulus

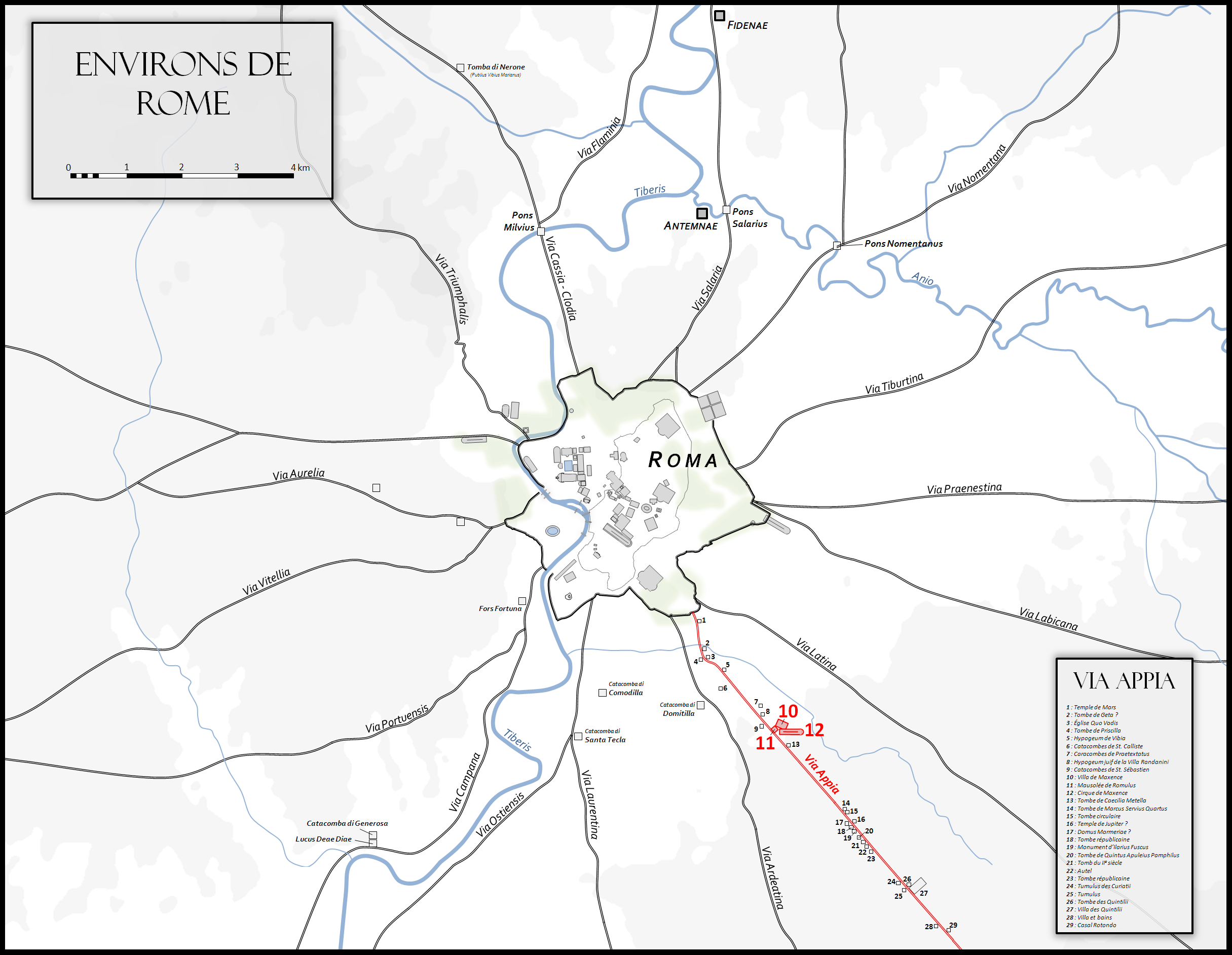
The Villa of Maxentius in la Via Appia

== Bibliography ==
- Humphrey, John H. (1986). Roman Circuses: Arenas for Chariot Racing. University of California Press. ISBN 978-0-520-04921-5.
- Nibby, Antonio (1825). Del Circo volgarmente detto di Caracalla (in Italian). Roma.
- Vassi, Giuseppe (1763). Itinerario istruttivo diviso in otto stazioni o giornate per ritrovare con facilità tutte le antiche e moderne magnificenze di Roma (in Italian).
- Bertolotti, Romana de Angelis; Ioppolo, Giovanni; Pisani Sartorio, Giuseppina (1988). La residenza imperiale di Massenzio. Villa, mausoleo e circo (in Italian). Vol. 2. Roma: Fratelli Palombi. ISBN 9788876213052.
- Franceschini, Marina De (2005). Villa di Massenzio sulla via Appia (in Italian). Roma: L'ERMA di BRETSCHNEIDER. pp. 192–196. ISBN 88-8265-311-0.
