= The Battle of the Milvian Bridge =

- The Battle of the Milvian Bridge took place between the Roman Emperors Constantine I and Maxentius in 312.

The Battle of the Milvian Bridge may also refer to:

- The Battle of the Milvian Bridge (Giulio Romano), a fresco in one of the rooms that are now known as the Stanze di Raffaello, in the Apostolic Palace in the Vatican
