= Fabilius =

Ancient Roman professor of literature

Fabilius or Fabillus was an Ancient Roman professor of literature in the third century AD.

He instructed the younger Maximinus, the later Emperor, in the Greek language. He was also the author of several Greek epigrams, which were mostly inscriptive lines for the statues and portraits of his young pupil.
