= Circus of Maxentius =

Ancient Roman circus in Rome

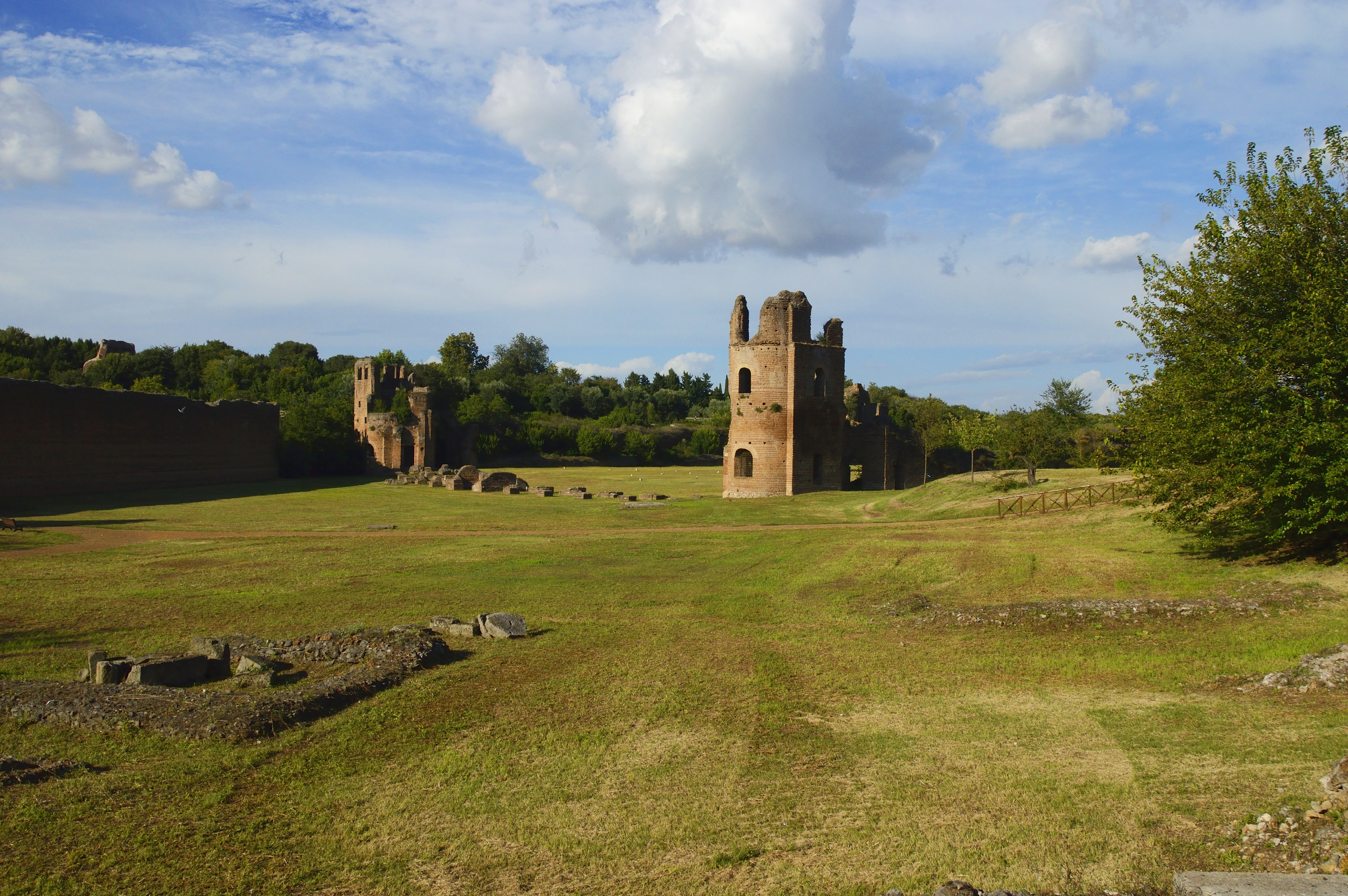
- Part of the ruins of the Circus of Maxentius
- Interactive map of Circus of Maxentius
- 41°51′17″N 12°31′14″E
- Type: Circus

History
- Built: 306 AD
- Abandoned: c. 312 AD

The Circus of Maxentius (known until the 19th century as the Circus of Caracalla) is an ancient structure in Rome, Italy, part of a complex of buildings erected by emperor Maxentius on the Via Appia between AD 306 and 312. It is situated between the second and third miles of the Via Appia, between the basilica and catacombs of San Sebastiano and the imposing late republican tomb of Caecilia Metella, which dominates the hill that rises immediately to the east of the complex. It is part of the Appian Way Regional Park.

== Overview ==
The Circus of Maxentius is the best preserved circus in the area of Rome, and is second only in size to the Circus Maximus in Rome. The only games recorded at the Circus were its inaugural ones and these are generally thought to have been funerary in character. They would have been held in honour of Maxentius' son Valerius Romulus, who died in AD 309 at a very young age and who was probably interred in the adjacent cylindrical tomb (tomb of Romulus). The imperial box (pulvinar) of the Circus is connected, via a covered portico, to the villa of Maxentius, whose scant remains are today obscured by dense foliage, except for the apse of the basilical audience hall, which pokes out from the tree tops. The complex was probably never used after the death of Maxentius in AD 312 (archaeological excavations indicate the tracks were covered in sand already in antiquity).

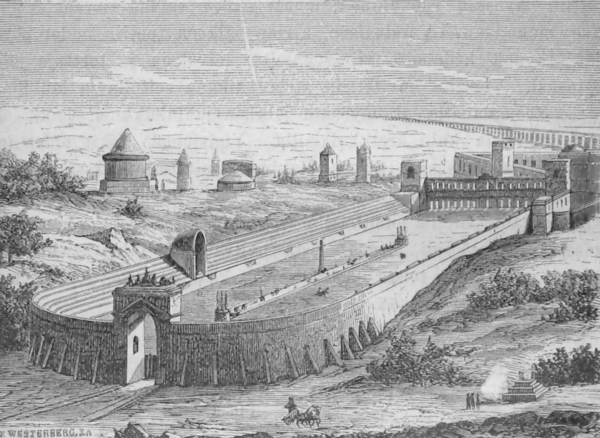
Circus of Maxentius in ancient times

The Circus is constructed, after the fashion of many Roman buildings of this period, in concrete faced with opus vittatum. The putlog holes which held the scaffolding are evident in many places in the walls, which stand several metres high in places. The modern-day visitor enters the Circus from the west end, where the remains of the two still imposing towers are located. These would have contained the mechanism for raising the carceres (starting gates), which were positioned on an arcuated course between the towers. Once out of the gates, the chariots would race down the track, the full 503 metres (550 yd) length of which can still be seen. The track was excavated in the 19th century by Antonio Nibby, whose discovery of an inscription to the 'divine Romulus' led to the Circus being positively identified with Maxentius. The spina, the barrier running down the middle of the track, is exactly 1000 Roman feet (296 m) long, and would have been cased in marble. Its many ornaments, including cones, metae and obelisks, would have cast shadows across the track in the late afternoon sun. In the centre stood the Obelisk of Domitian which Maxentius presumably had moved from the Isaeum as part of the tribute to his son. Covered in hieroglyphs and lying broken in five pieces it was much discussed during the Renaissance and engraved by Etienne du Perac among others. The Collector Earl of Arundel paid a deposit for the pieces in the 1630s and attempted to have them removed to London but Urban VIII forbade its export and his successor Innocent X had it erected in the Piazza Navona by Bernini. The track's outer walls were laid out to be wider at the start to allow the racers to spread out before reaching the spina, and were also made wider at the point of the turn, which accommodated the turning circle of the chariots. At the east end of the track is a small triumphal arch, in which exposed opus vittatum work can be seen. The judges' box was located about two-thirds of the way down on the southern side of the track, where it would have been in clear sight of the finishing line. The imperial box, the remains of which are identifiable, was situated in the usual fashion to give the most dramatic views of the race. Directly opposite the imperial box, in the south track wall, there is a small arch, through which can be seen the Tomb of Caecilia Metella. From the height of the box the tomb would have been entirely visible, and it has been argued that the Circus, which is curiously positioned relative to contemporary and existing structures, was purposely skewed in order to integrate the tomb into the Maxentian architectural scheme.

The circus-complex of Maxentius as originally conceived can be partly understood as an elaborate imperial version of the type of elite residences that appear in Rome and throughout the provinces in late antiquity, whose pretensions are evidenced in the regular presence of large audience halls, familial tombs and circus-shaped structures – the Villa Gordiani, also in Rome, and the complex at Piazza Armerina in Sicily, are two examples. The progenitor of these residences was of course the Palatine complex in Rome, where Maxentius himself made some alterations to the palace in which he played out public life. Imperial parallels for the Via Appia complex include that of Maxentius's contemporary Galerius in Thessaloniki and Diocletian's Palace in Split.

The complex may well have changed in use and character following the death of Romulus; the mausoleum, surely intended for Maxentius himself, as were the mausolea built by Galerius and Diocletian intended for themselves whilst still alive, now received as its occupant Maxentius' only son. The inaugural games became funeral games, and these, like the Circus, were dedicated to the now deified Romulus. The pervasive emphasis of death and apotheosis has led to the argument that the whole complex became overwhelmingly funerary in character from this point, and that the memorial references generated by Romulus extend, spatially and ideologically, to the heart of Rome. Maxentius died just three years after Romulus, at the Battle of the Milvian Bridge, when he was defeated by Constantine the Great, who then expropriated the property.

The Circus is under the care of the Soprintendenza Archeologica di Roma, and is open to the public.

== See also ==
- Colosseum – Ancient Roman amphitheater in Rome
- List of ancient monuments in Rome

== Sources ==
- Coarelli, F. (2008). Roma. Rome: Laterza.
- Claridge, A. (1998). Rome. Oxford: University Press.
- Steinby, E. M. (1993–2000). Lexicon Topographicum Urbis Romae, 5 vols.
- Weitzmann, Kurt, ed., Age of spirituality : late antique and early Christian art, third to seventh century, no. 100, 1979, Metropolitan Museum of Art, New York, ISBN 9780870991790; full text available online from The Metropolitan Museum of Art Libraries

Preceded by Circus Maximus	Landmarks of Rome; Circus of Maxentius	Succeeded by Circus of Nero
