= Gaius Ceionius Rufius Volusianus =

Roman senator

Gaius Ceionius Rufius Volusianus (c. 246 – c. 330) was a Roman senator who had a lengthy political career and who was appointed consul at least twice, the known dates being AD 311 and 314.

== Biography ==
It has been speculated that Rufius Volusianus may have been the son of Ceionius Varus, the Praefectus urbi of Rome in AD 284. His early career is unknown, but it is speculated that he held a suffect consulship around 280 under the emperor Probus. Around 282 he was appointed by the emperor Carinus to the proconsular position of Corrector Italiae, with his area of administration being centred on central and southern Italy. He held this post until about 290.

From 305 to 306, Volusianus was appointed the proconsular governor of Africa. When the Roman usurper Maxentius was recognized as emperor in Africa, Volusianus attached himself to his court. Around 309, Volusianus was made Maxentius’ Praetorian Prefect, an office he held until 310. He was sent by Maxentius to recover the province of Africa, which had rebelled and acclaimed Domitius Alexander emperor, causing severe food shortages in Rome. He crossed over to Africa with a small but well-trained force and proceeded to defeat the poorly armed rebels. His troops then wrought havoc in Carthage and other African cities. Volusianus then trapped Alexander in Cirta which was sacked. The captured Alexander was strangled, and his supporters were purged from their positions of authority and killed. Having reclaimed the province, Volusianus returned to Rome.

As a reward for his service in North Africa, from 28 October 310 to 28 October 311, Volusianus was the Praefectus urbi of Rome. This was a special honor, as his taking up the posting in October 310 coincided with the very day five years before when Maxentius was acclaimed as emperor. From September 311 until the end of the year, he was the consul of Maxentius alongside Aradius Rufinus. This may have been an attempt to appease the aristocracy of Rome who were becoming discontented with Maxentius’ rule. With the defeat and death of Maxentius at the hands of Constantine I in 312, Volusianus transferred his loyalty to the new emperor. He was recognized as one of the Comiti domini nostri Constantini invicti et perpetui semper Augusti (or Companion of the emperor Constantine), making him one of several senators who served under both Maxentius and Constantine, and his subsequent career under Constantine showed that the emperor was conscious of the need to win over the loyalty of the senatorial elite in Rome.

As his periods in office during the reign of Maxentius were not recognized, Volusianus was again appointed Urban Prefect of Rome, a position he held from 8 December 313 until 20 August 315. During this period he was also styled iudex sacrarum cognitionum, meaning he presided over judicial cases in the name of the emperor. This was followed by his appointment as consul prior alongside Petronius Annianus in 314. In gratitude for these appointments, Volusianus erected a statue of Constantine in Trajan's Forum, dedicated to the “restorer of the human race, enlarger of the Roman empire and dominion, and founder of eternal security.” He also may have played a role in the construction of the Arch of Constantine, which was dedicated to the emperor after Constantine returned to Rome in July 315. However, in late 315, Volusianus was dismissed from office and later exiled by decree of the Senate as a result of his enemies gaining the ear of the emperor and bringing him into disgrace.

Volusianus was a member of the Quindecimviri sacris faciundis as well as possibly being one of the Septemviri epulonum. His family owned lands in Volaterrae and North Africa.

Volusianus was married to a Nummia Albina, and had at least one son, Ceionius Rufius Albinus, who was one of the consuls of 335.

== Notes ==
Political offices
| Preceded by Tatius Andronicus, Pompeius Probus, Maxentius | Roman consul 311 with Aradius Rufinus, Galerius, Maximinus Daza | Succeeded by Constantine I, Licinius, Maxentius |
| Preceded by Constantine I, Licinius, Maximinus Daza | Roman consul 314 with Petronius Annianus | Succeeded by Constantine I Licinius |
