= The Battle of the Milvian Bridge (Giulio Romano) =

Fresco by Giulio Romano

The Battle of Milvian Bridge
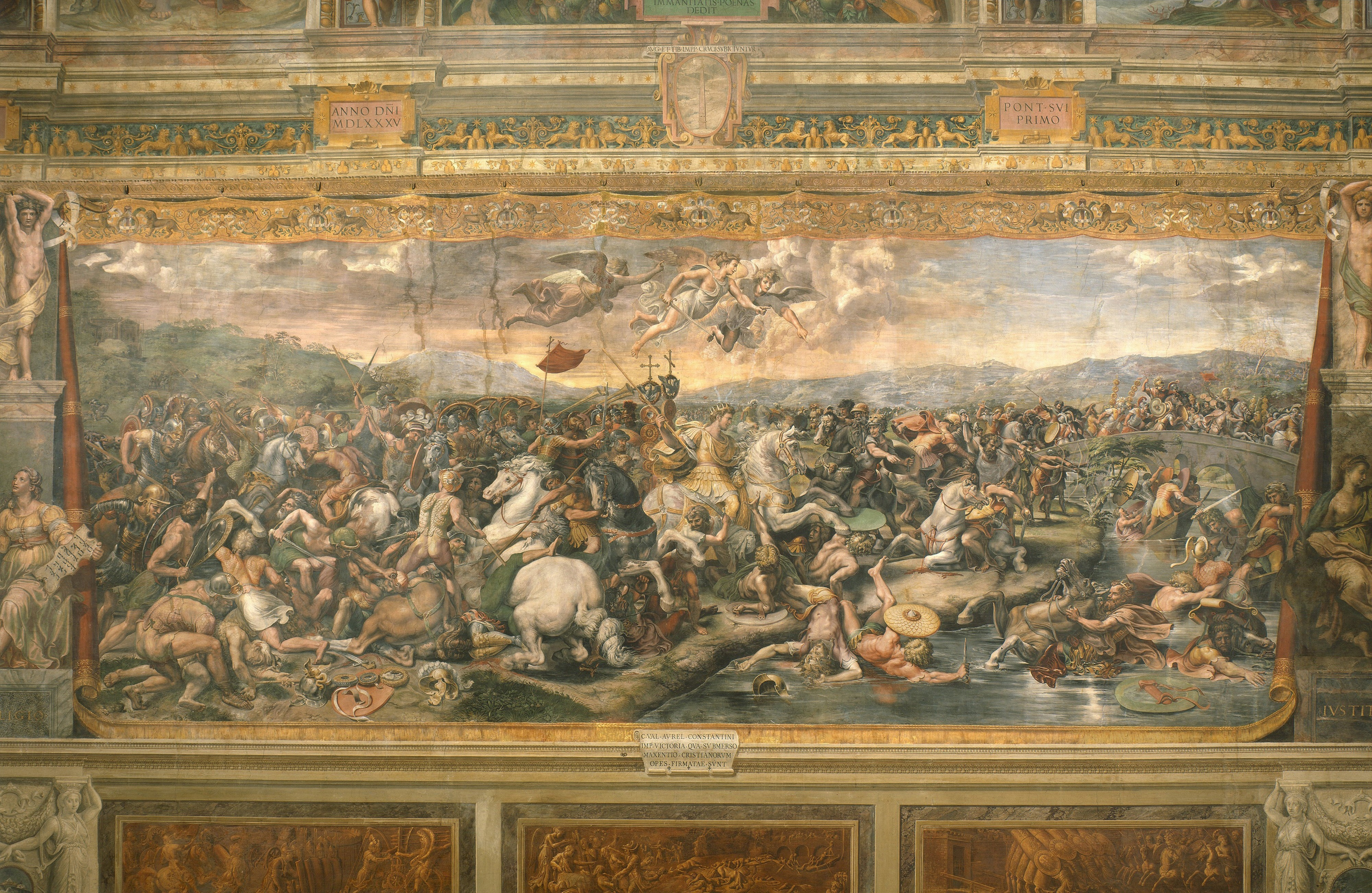
- Artist: Giulio Romano
- Year: 1520-1524
- Type: fresco
- Location: Apostolic Palace, Vatican Museums, Vatican City

The Battle of the Milvian Bridge, or The Battle at Pons Milvius, is a fresco in one of the rooms that are now known as the Stanze di Raffaello, in the Apostolic Palace in the Vatican depicting the Battle of the Milvian Bridge.

== Description ==
The Battle of Milvian Bridge, located in the Sala di Costantino ("Hall of Constantine"), is by Giulio Romano and other assistants of the Italian Renaissance artist Raphael, who died in 1520. It was most likely painted to Raphael's design between 1520 and 1524.

After the master's death, Giulio Romano worked together with other members of Raphael's workshop to finish the commission to decorate with frescoes the rooms that are now known as the Stanze di Raffaello, in the Apostolic Palace in the Vatican. The Battle of the Milvian Bridge shows the battle that took place on 28 October 312 between the Roman Emperors Constantine I and Maxentius. Legend says that Constantine had a dream where a cross appeared in the heavens; a voice told him he would win the battle of Ponte Milvio if he used the cross as his standard. The cross became his standard and he won the battle, and attributed his victory to the God of Christianity.

The Ponte Milvio still stands in Rome in pristine condition; until only a few years ago cars were permitted to use it to cross over the Tiber. It can now be used only by pedestrians.
