= Maxentius =

Roman emperor from 306 to 312

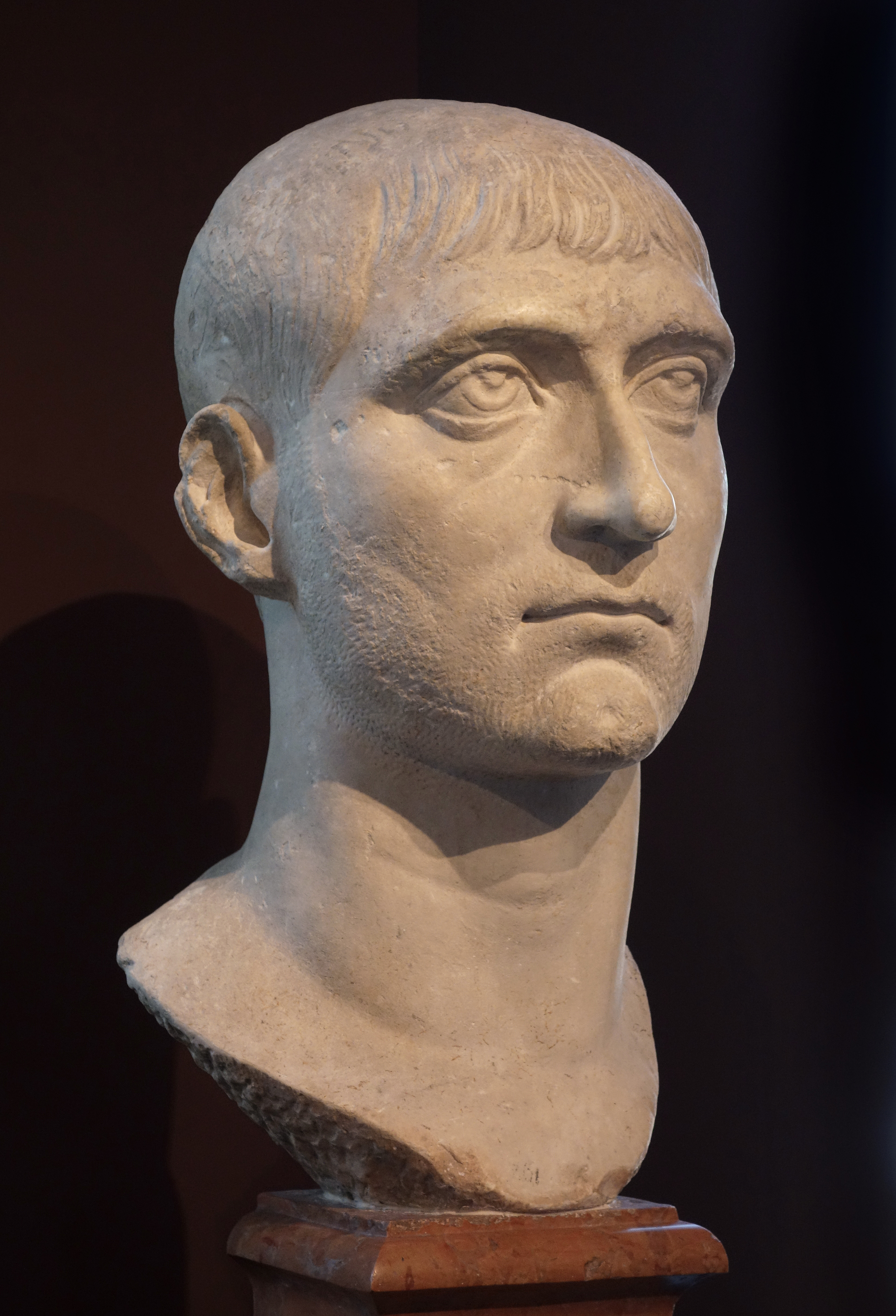
- Bust from Staatliche Kunstsammlungen Dresden

Roman emperor
- Reign: 28 October 306 – 28 October 312
- Predecessor: Severus II
- Successor: Constantine I
- Co-rulers: See list: Severus II (306–307); Galerius (East, 306–311); Maximian (306–308); Constantine I (306–312); Licinius (308–312); Maximinus II (East, 310–12)
- Rival emperor: Domitius Alexander (308–310)
- Born: c. 283
- Died: 28 October 312 (aged c. 29); Rome
- Spouse: Valeria Maximilla
- Issue: Valerius Romulus and 1 other son
Names
- Marcus Aurelius Maxentius; Marcus Aurelius Valerius Maxentius
Regnal name
- Imperator Caesar Marcus Aurelius Valerius Maxentius Augustus
- Father: Maximian
- Mother: Eutropia

Marcus Aurelius Valerius Maxentius (c. 283 – 28 October 312) was a Roman emperor from 306 until his death in 312. Despite ruling in Italy and North Africa, and having the recognition of the Senate in Rome, he was not recognized as a legitimate emperor by his fellow emperors.

He was the son of former Emperor Maximian and the son-in-law of Emperor Galerius. The latter part of his reign was preoccupied with civil war, allying with Maximinus against Licinius and Constantine. The latter defeated him at the Battle of the Milvian Bridge in 312, where Maxentius, with his army in flight, purportedly perished by drowning in the Tiber river.

Maxentius was the last emperor permanently to reside in Rome. He attempted to embellish, restore and improve the ancient capital, carrying out important building works, including the Temple of the Divine Romulus (dedicated to his deceased son), the Basilica of Maxentius, which was completed by Constantine, the villa and the circus of Maxentius.

== Early life, family, and accession ==
=== Early life and family ===
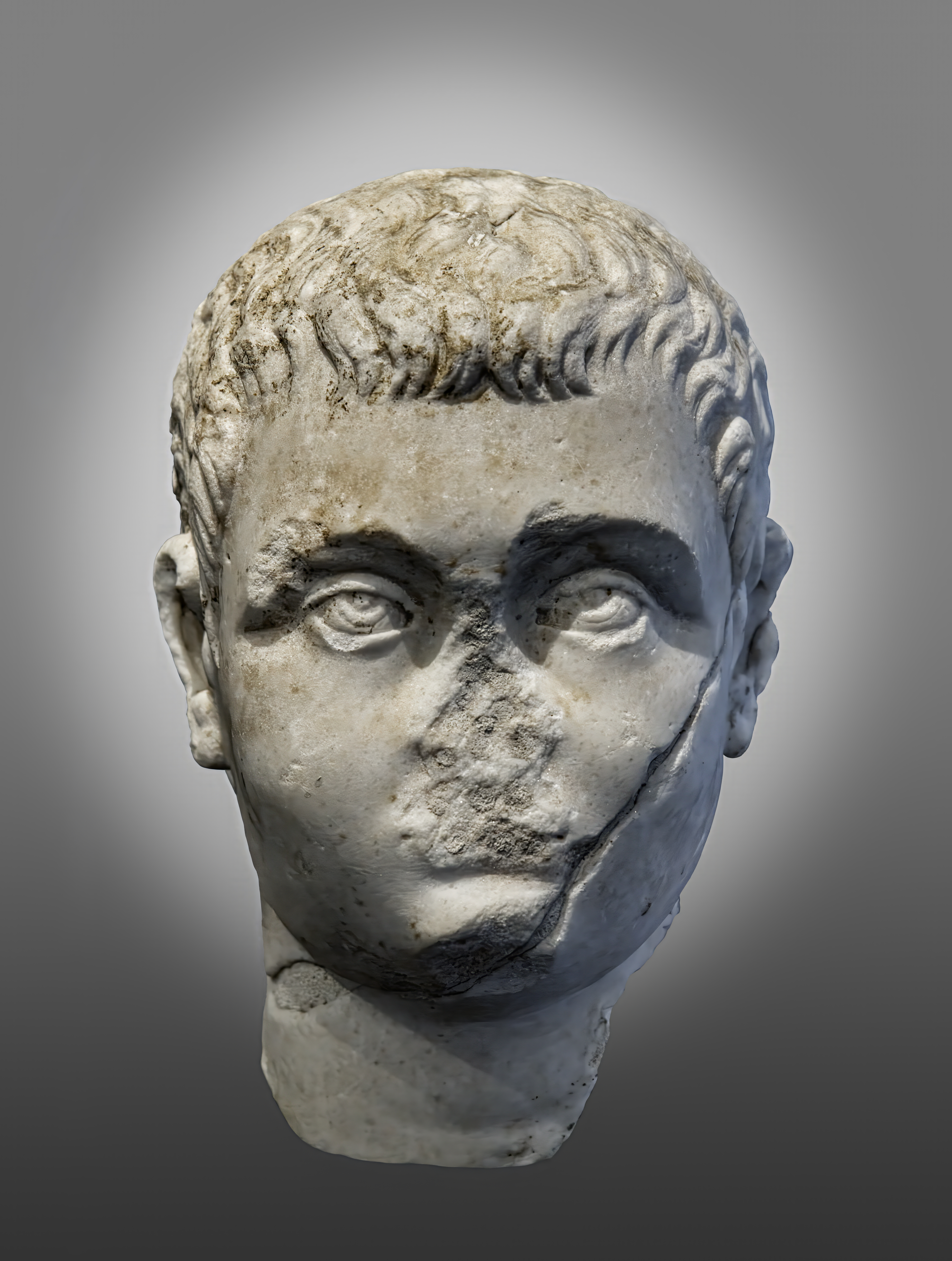
Possible portrait of a juvenile Maxentius, Musée Saint-Raymond

Maxentius was the son of Emperor Maximian and his Syrian wife Eutropia. As his father became emperor in 285, he was regarded as the crown prince who would eventually follow his father on the throne. He seems not to have served, however, in any important military or administrative position during the reign of Diocletian and his father. The exact date of his marriage to Valeria Maximilla, daughter of Galerius, is unknown. He had two sons, Valerius Romulus and an unknown one.

In 305, Diocletian and Maximian abdicated, and the former Caesares Constantius and Galerius became Augusti. Although two sons of emperors – Constantine and Maxentius – were available, they were passed over for the new tetrarchy, and Valerius Severus and Maximinus Daza were appointed Caesars. Lactantius' Epitome states that Galerius hated Maxentius and used his influence with Diocletian to see that Maxentius was ignored in the succession; perhaps Diocletian also thought Maxentius was not qualified for the military duties of the imperial office. Maxentius retired to an estate some miles from Rome.

When Constantius died in 306, his son Constantine was crowned emperor on 25 July and subsequently accepted by Galerius into the Tetrarchy as Caesar. This set the precedent for Maxentius' accession later in the same year.

=== Accession ===
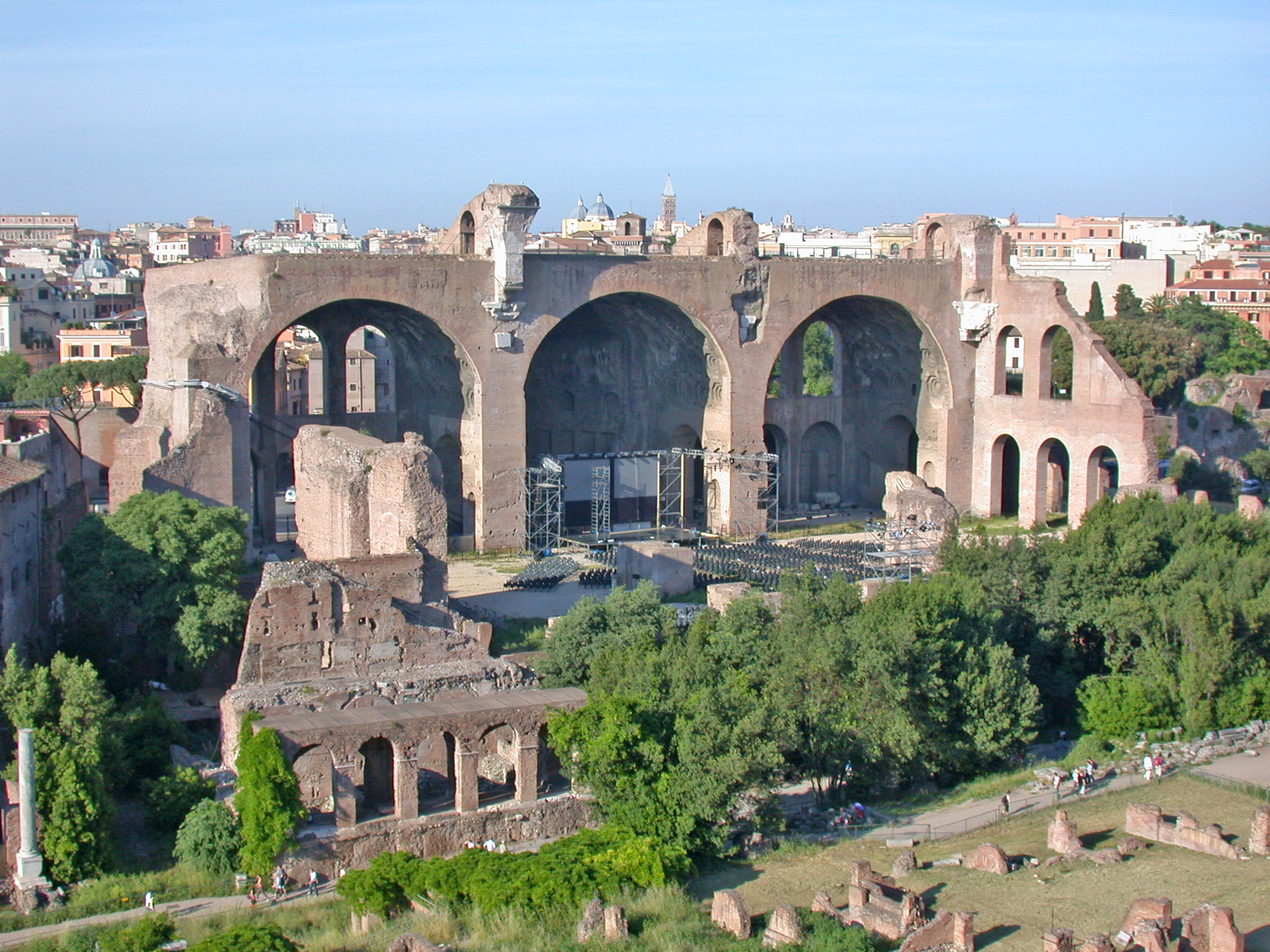
The Basilica of Maxentius in the Roman Forum. Completed by his enemy Constantine, it was one of the most impressive edifices of ancient times.

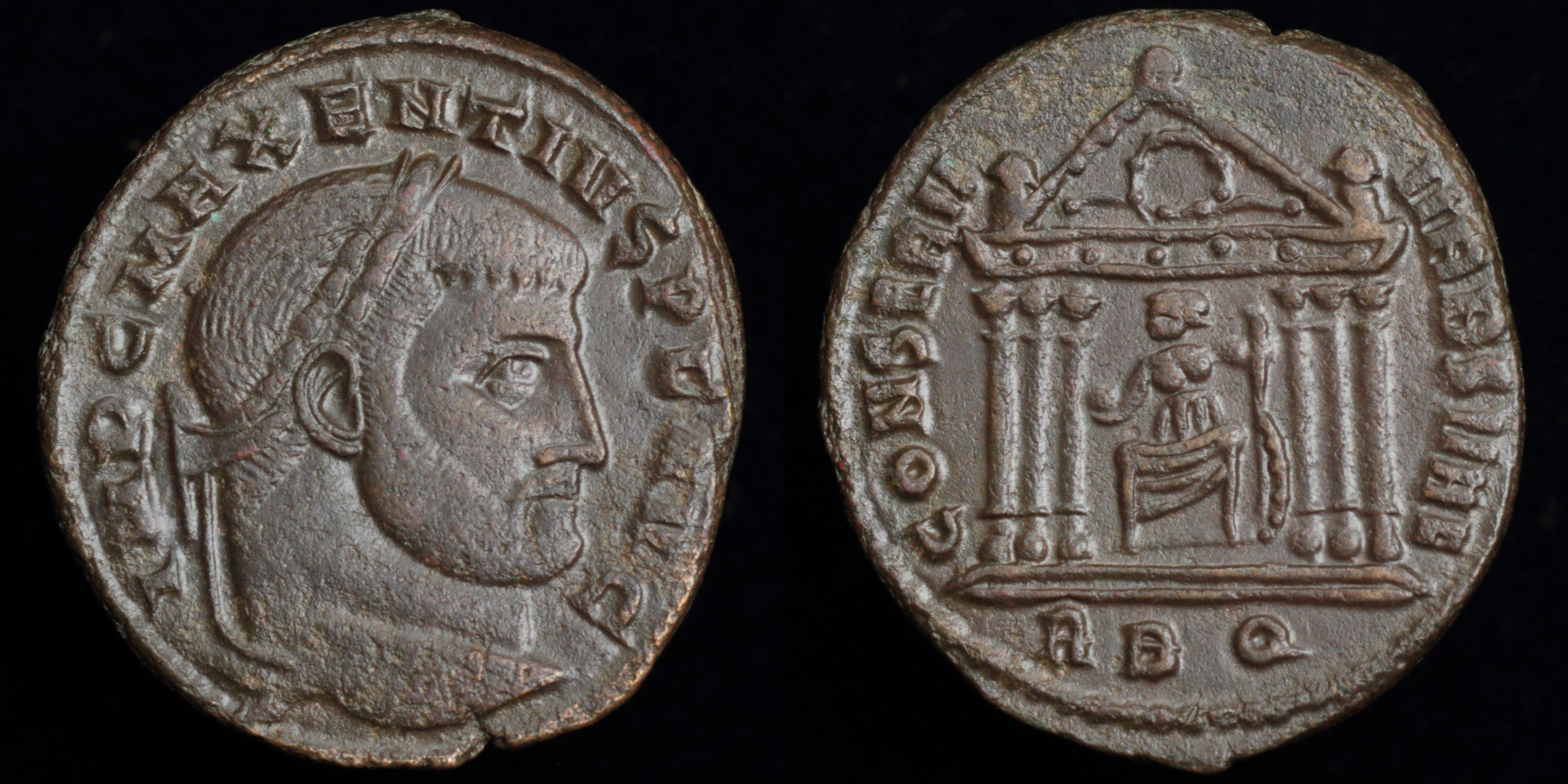
Bronze follis struck by Maxentius in Rome 308 - 310 AD. This coin is commemorating the reconstruction of the temple of Roma following the fire in 307 AD. Roma holding globe and sceptre seated within hexastyle temple with shield on the ground is depicted on the reverse.

When rumours reached the capital that the emperors tried to subject the Roman population to the capitation tax, like every other city of the empire, and wanted to dissolve the remnants of the Praetorian Guard which were still stationed at Rome, riots broke out. A group of officers of the city's garrisons (Zosimus calls them Marcellianus, Marcellus and Lucianus) turned to Maxentius to accept the imperial purple, probably judging that the official recognition which was granted to Constantine would not be withheld from Maxentius, son of an emperor as well. Maxentius accepted the honour, promised donations to the city's troops, and was publicly acclaimed emperor on 28 October 306. The usurpation obviously went largely without bloodshed (Zosimus names only one victim); the prefect of Rome went over to Maxentius and retained his office. Apparently the conspirators also approached Maximian, who had retired to a palace in Lucania, but he declined to resume power for the time being.

Maxentius managed to be recognized as emperor in Central Italy and Southern Italy, the islands of Corsica and Sardinia and Sicily, and the African provinces. Northern Italy remained under the control of the western Augustus Valerius Severus, who resided in Mediolanum (Milan).

Maxentius refrained from using the titles Augustus or Caesar at first and styled himself princeps invictus ("undefeated prince"), in the hope of obtaining recognition of his reign by the senior emperor Galerius. However, the latter refused to do so. Apart from his alleged antipathy towards Maxentius, Galerius probably wanted to deter others from following the examples of Constantine and Maxentius and declaring themselves emperors. Constantine firmly controlled his father's army and territories, and Galerius could pretend that his accession was part of the regular succession in the tetrarchy, but neither was the case with Maxentius: he would be the fifth emperor, and he had only few troops at his command. Galerius reckoned that it would be not too difficult to quell the usurpation, and early in 307, the Augustus Severus marched on Rome with a large army.

The majority of this army consisted of soldiers who had fought under Maxentius' father Maximian for years, and as Severus reached Rome, the majority of his army went over to Maxentius and received a large amount of money. When Maximian himself finally left his retreat and returned to Rome to assume the imperial office once again and support his son, Severus with the rest of his army retreated to Ravenna. Shortly after, he surrendered to Maximian, who promised that his life would be spared.

After the defeat of Severus, Maxentius took possession of northern Italy up to the Alps and the Istrian peninsula to the east, and assumed the title of Augustus, which (in his eyes) had become vacant with the surrender of Severus.

== Emperor ==
=== Early reign ===
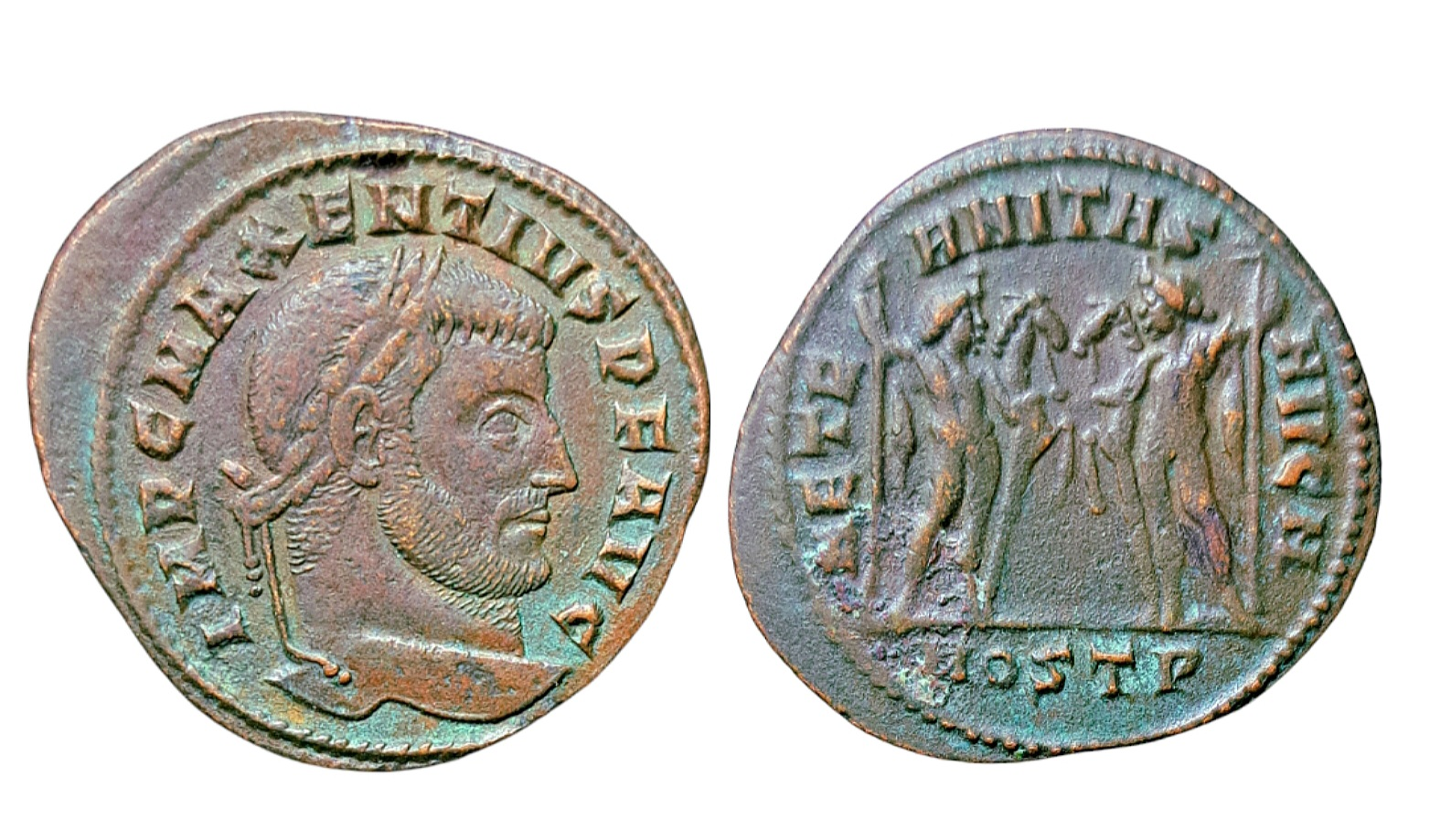
Maxentius as Augustus on a follis. Legend: IMPerator Caesar MAXENTIVS Pius Felix AVGustus / AETERNITAS AUGusti Nostri, the Dioscuri standing facing each other, their horses between.- M OST Q (Mint Ostia, officina P).

The joint rule of Maxentius and Maximian in Rome was tested further when Galerius marched to Italy in the summer of 307 with an even larger army. While negotiating with the invader, Maxentius could repeat what he did to Severus, by the promise of large sums of money and the authority of Maximian, many soldiers of Galerius defected to him. Galerius was forced to withdraw, plundering Italy on his way. Some time during the invasion, Severus was put to death by Maxentius, probably at Tres Tabernae near Rome (the exact circumstances of his death are not certain). After the failed campaign of Galerius, Maxentius' reign over Italy and Africa was firmly established. Beginning in 307, he tried to arrange friendly contacts with Constantine and in the summer of that year, Maximian travelled to Gaul, where Constantine married his daughter Fausta and was in turn appointed Augustus by the senior emperor. Constantine tried to avoid breaking with Galerius and did not openly support Maxentius during the invasion.

In 308, probably April, Maximian tried to depose his son in an assembly of soldiers in Rome; surprisingly to him, the present troops remained faithful to his son and he had to flee to Constantine. On 20 April, Maxentius proclaimed himself as the new consul of the year, alongside his son Romulus. In the conference of Carnuntum, in the autumn of that same year, Maxentius was once again denied recognition as legitimate emperor, and Licinius was appointed Augustus with the task of regaining the lost domains.

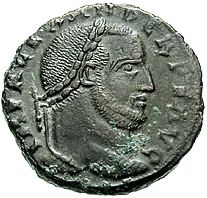
Follis of Emperor Alexander struck in Carthage.

Late in 308, Domitius Alexander was acclaimed as a rival emperor in Carthage, and the African provinces seceded from Maxentian rule. This produced a dangerous situation for Maxentius, as Africa was critical to Rome's food supply. In addition to Africa, the island of Sardinia also defected to the usurper. There is evidence to support that Constantine secretly allied himself with Alexander in opposition to Maxentius. In any event, a small army, led by Maxentius's praetorian prefect Rufius Volusianus, invaded Africa and defeated Alexander around 310. Maxentius executed the usurper and seized the wealth of his supporters, as well as bringing large amounts of grain to Rome.

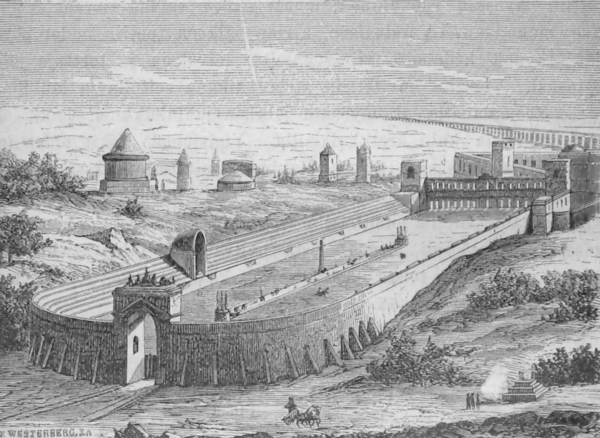
Circus of Maxentius in ancient times

Maxentius' eldest son Valerius Romulus died in 309, at the age of about fourteen, was deified and buried in a mausoleum in the Villa of Maxentius at the Via Appia. Nearby, Maxentius also constructed the Circus of Maxentius. After the death of Maximian in 309 or 310, relations with Constantine rapidly deteriorated and Maxentius allied with Maximinus to counter an alliance between Constantine and Licinius. He allegedly tried to secure the province of Raetia north of the Alps, thereby dividing the realms of Constantine and Licinius (reported by Zosimus); the plan was not carried out, as Constantine acted first.

In 310, Maxentius lost Istria to Licinius, who could not continue the campaign. By the middle of 310 Galerius had become too ill to involve himself in imperial politics and he died soon after 30 April 311. Galerius' death destabilized what remained of the Tetrarchic system. On hearing the news, Maximinus mobilized against Licinius and seized Asia Minor before meeting Licinius on the Bosphorus to arrange terms for peace. Meanwhile Maxentius strengthened his support among the Christians of Italy by allowing them to elect a new Bishop of Rome, Eusebius.

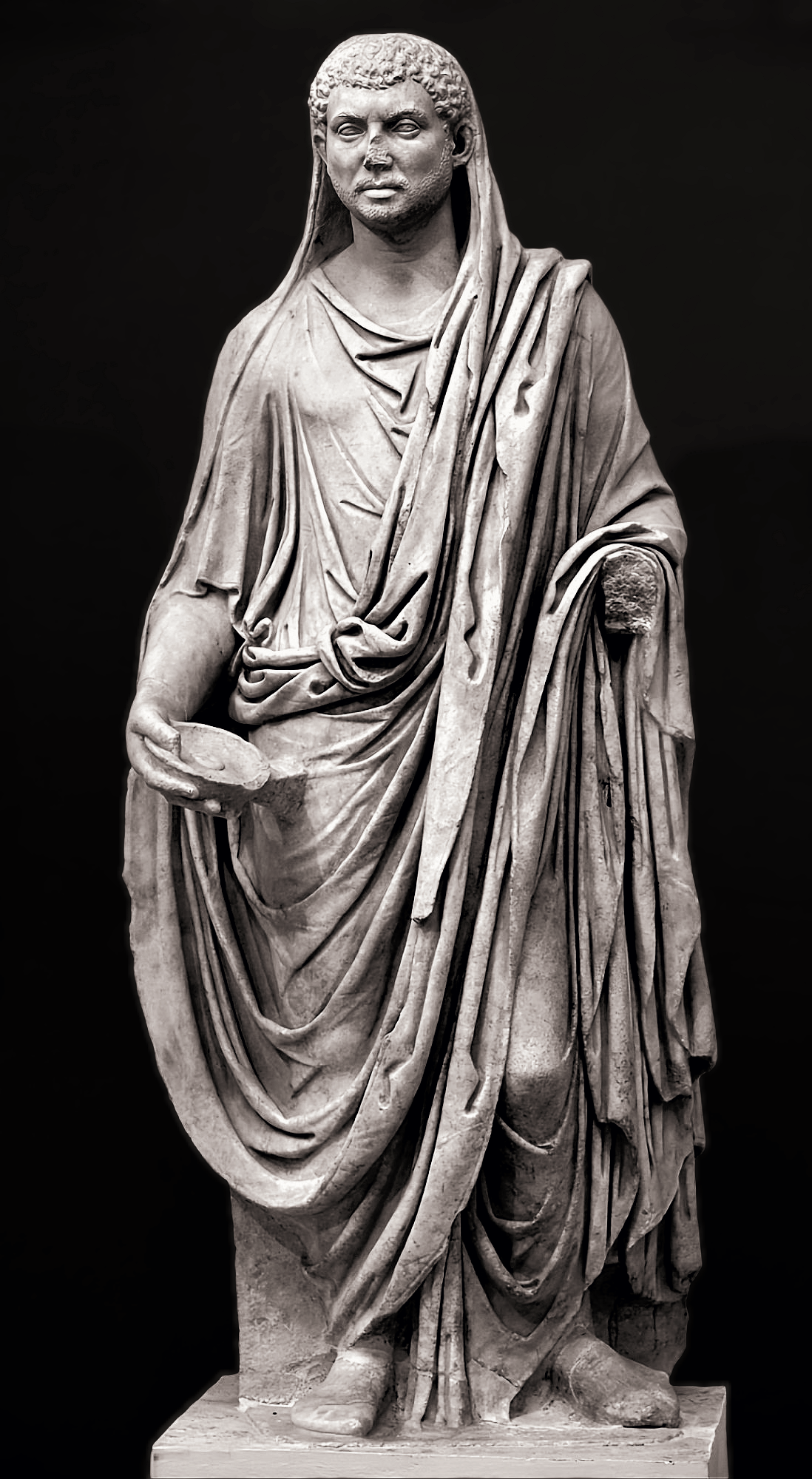
Possible portrait in the Museo Ostiense, a recarved Antonine statue.

Maxentius was far from secure, his early support dissolving into open protest; by 312, he was a man barely tolerated. Without the revenues of the empire, Maxentius was forced to resume taxation in Italy to support his army and his building projects in Rome. The election of a bishop did not aid much, either, as Diocletian's persecution had split the Italian church into competing factions over the issue of apostasy (see Donatism). The Christians of Italy could easily see that Constantine was more sympathetic to their plight than Maxentius. In the summer of 311, Maxentius mobilized against Constantine while Licinius was occupied with affairs in the East. He declared war on Constantine, vowing to avenge his father's "murder". Constantine, to prevent Maxentius from forming a hostile alliance with Licinius, forged his own alliance with the man over the winter of 311–12 by offering to him his sister Constantia in marriage. Maximinus Daza considered Constantine's arrangement with Licinius an affront to his authority. In response, he sent ambassadors to Rome, offering political recognition to Maxentius in exchange for military support. Two alliances, Maximinus and Maxentius, Constantine and Licinius, lined up against one another. The emperors prepared for war.

=== War against Constantine ===
==== Verona ====
Maxentius expected an attack along his eastern flank from Licinius and stationed an army in Verona. Constantine had smaller forces than his opponent: with his forces withdrawn from Africa, with the praetorian and Imperial Horse Guard, and with the troops he had taken from Severus, Maxentius had an army equal to approximately 100,000 soldiers to use against his opponents in the north. Many of these he used to garrison fortified towns across the region, keeping most stationed with him in Verona. Against this, Constantine could only bring a force of between twenty-five and forty thousand men. The bulk of his troops simply could not be withdrawn from the Rhine frontiers without negative consequences. It was against the recommendations of his advisers and generals, against popular expectation, that Constantine anticipated Maxentius, and struck first.

==== Turin ====
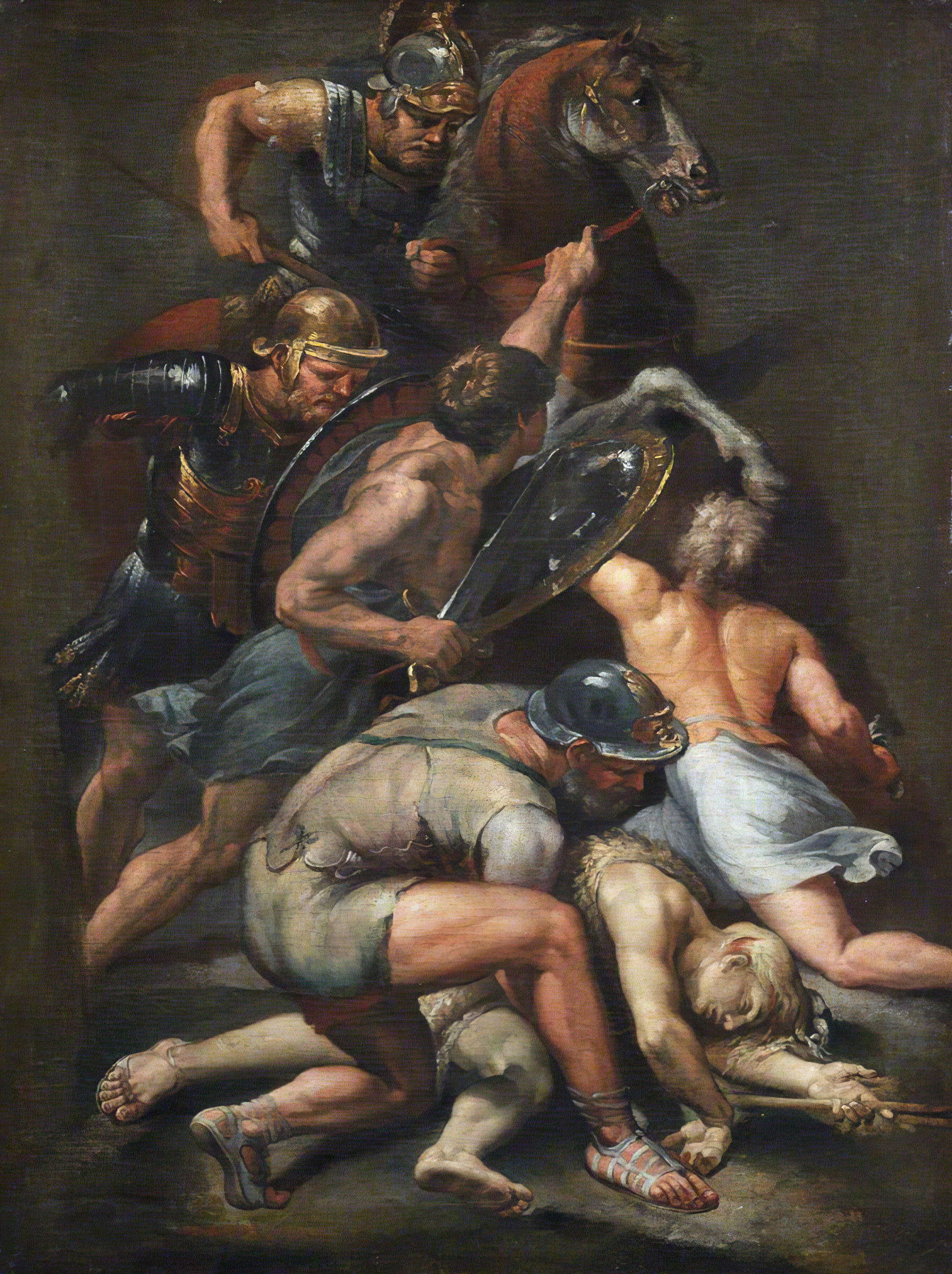
Battle of Constantine and Maxentius (detail of fresco in the Vatican Museums) c. 1650 by Lazzaro Baldi after Giulio Romano at the University of Edinburgh

As early as weather permitted, late in the spring of 312, Constantine crossed the Alps with a quarter of his army, a force equivalent to something less than forty thousand men. Having crossed the Cottian Alps at the Mont Cenis pass, he first came to Segusium (Susa, Italy), a heavily fortified town containing a military garrison, which shut its gates to him. Constantine ordered his forces to set its gates on fire and scale its walls, and took the town quickly. Constantine forbade the plunder of the town and advanced into northern Italy.

At the approach to the west of the important city of Augusta Taurinorum (Turin, Italy), Constantine encountered a large force of heavily armed Maxentian cavalry, labeled clibanarii or cataphracti in the ancient sources. In the ensuing battle Constantine spread his forces into a line, allowing Maxentius' cavalry to ride into the middle of his forces. As his forces broadly encircled the enemy cavalry, Constantine's own cavalry charged at the sides of the Maxentian cataphracts, beating them with iron-tipped clubs. Many Maxentian cavalrymen were dismounted, while most others were variously incapacitated by the blows. Constantine then commanded his foot soldiers to advance against the surviving Maxentian infantry, cutting them down as they fled. Victory, the panegyrist who speaks of the events declares, came easily. Turin refused to give refuge to the retreating forces of Maxentius. It opened its gates to Constantine instead. Other cities of the north Italian plain, recognizing Constantine's quick and clement victories, sent him embassies of congratulation for his victory. He moved on to Milan, where he was met with open gates and jubilant rejoicing. He resided there until the middle of the summer of 312 before moving on.

==== Milvian bridge ====
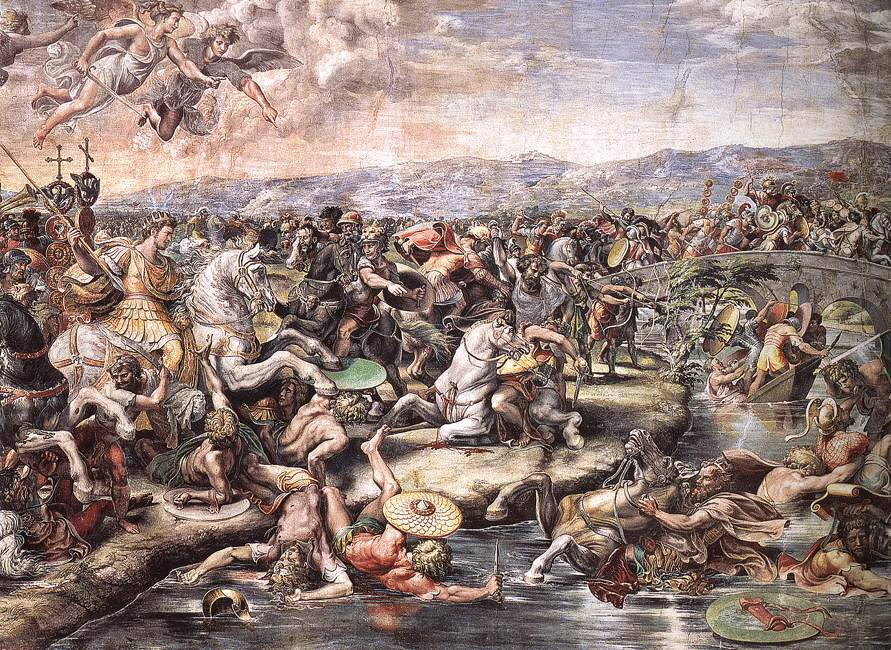
The Battle of the Milvian Bridge by Giulio Romano

It was expected that Maxentius would try the same strategy as against Severus and Galerius earlier; that is, remaining in the well-defended city of Rome, and sit out a siege which would cost his enemy much more. For somewhat uncertain reasons, he abandoned this plan, however, and offered battle to Constantine near the Milvian Bridge on 28 October 312. Ancient sources usually attribute this action to superstition or (if pro-Constantinian) divine providence. Maxentius of course had consulted soothsayers before battle, as was customary practice, and it can be assumed that they reported favourable omens, especially as the day of battle would be his dies imperii, the day of his accession to the throne (which was 28 October 306). What else may have motivated him is open to speculation.

The armies of Maxentius and Constantine met north of the city, some distance outside the walls, beyond the Tiber river on the Via Flaminia. Christian tradition, especially Lactantius and Eusebius of Caesarea, claims that Constantine fought under the labarum in that battle, revealed to him in a dream. Of the battle itself, not much is known – Constantine's forces defeated Maxentius's troops, who retreated to the Tiber, and in the chaos of the fleeing army trying to cross the river, Maxentius fell into the water and drowned. His body was found the next day and paraded through the city, and later sent to Africa, as a sign that he had surely perished. Maxentius' entire family, including his two orphaned children, were also executed.

== Overview and legacy ==
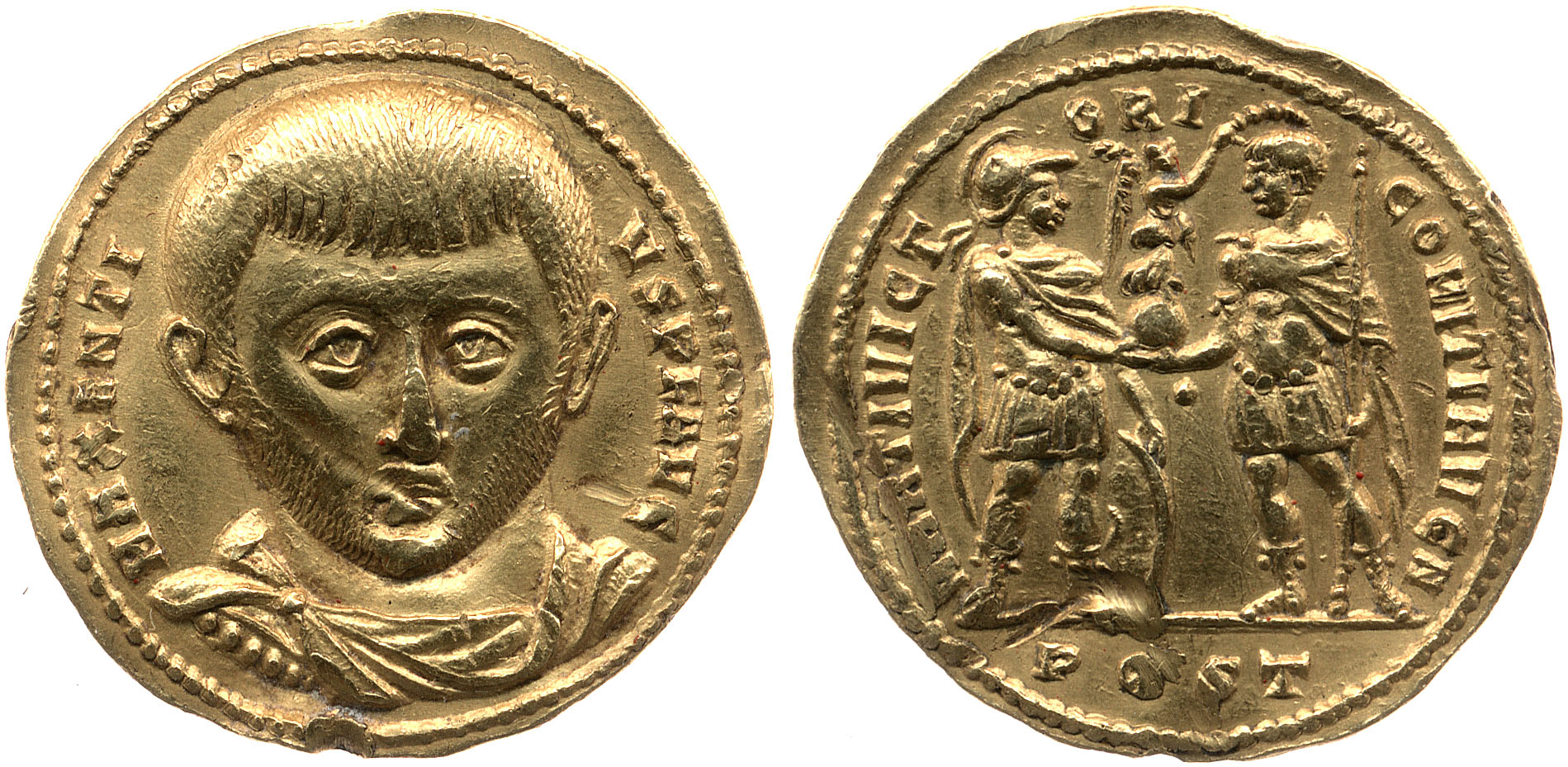
Aureus of Maxentius. Legend: MAXENTIVS P F AVG / MARTI VICTORI COMITI AVG N

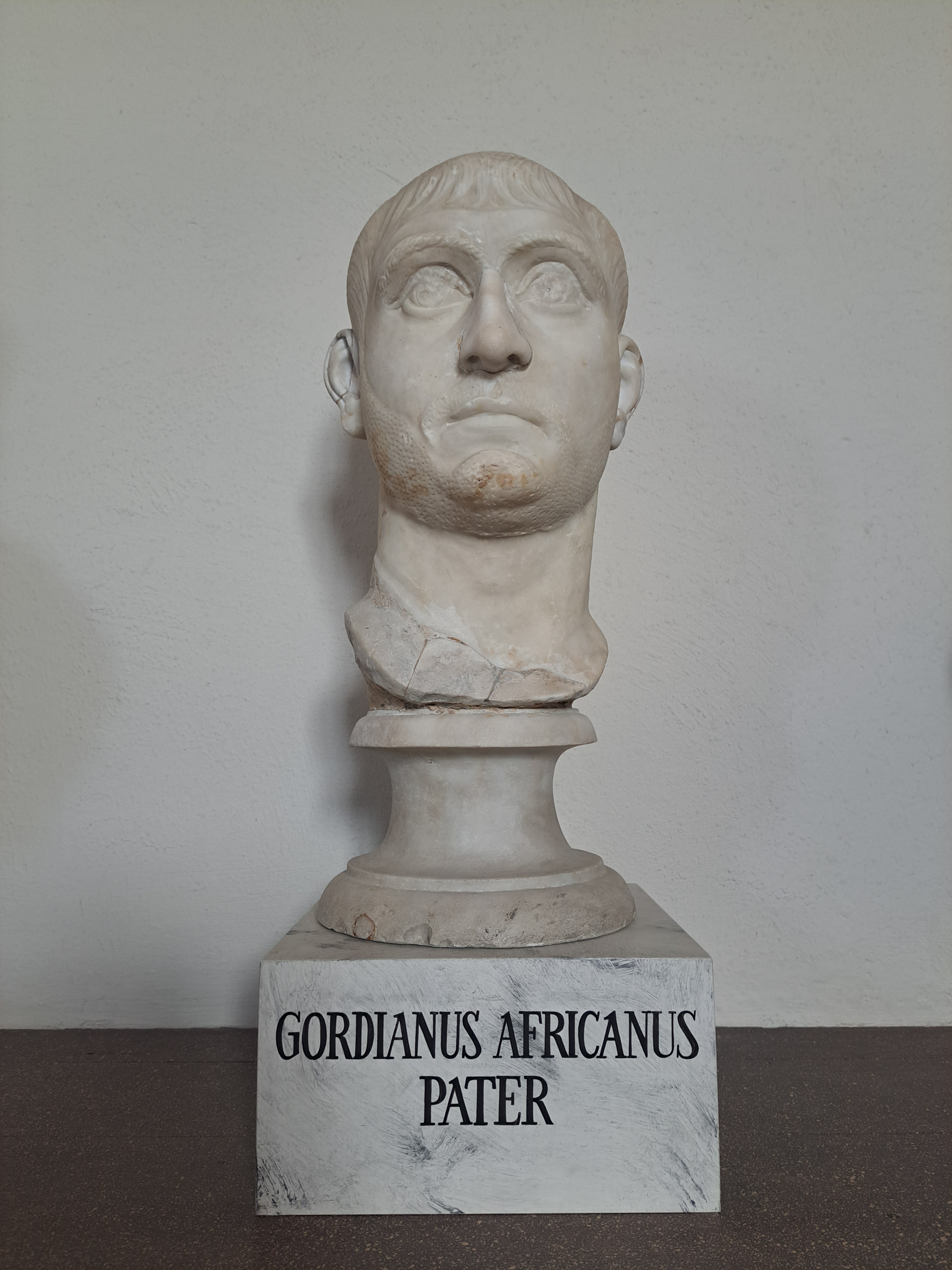
Over life-size head from Italy.

Studies conducted between 2021 and 2022 have made it possible to identify the manuscript tradition of Maxentius' epistles, which have undergone numerous interpolations and attempts of forgery to adapt the texts to a pro-Constantinian hagiographic narrative (Passio of Saint Catherine). A comparison with Roman law, legal papyri and the primary sources such as Diocletian's Senateconsult and edict of persecution has allowed an integrated critical reconstruction of the original texts, which perfectly mirrors what Eusebius of Caesarea, Optatus of Milevi and Saint Augustine report about Maxentius' pro-Christian policy. According to these new documents found in the Biblioteca Marciana of Venice, we learn that Maxentius ended the Great Persecution in his territories at least five years in advance of the Edict of Milan:

1- made Christianity a licit religion welcoming the "New Gods" in the Pax Deorum (Epistle 1)

2- abolished the edict of persecution of Diocletian by law (Epistle 1)

3- threatens serious punishments for anyone persisting in the persecution of Christians (Epistle 1)

4- He raged against the Donatist sect in Africa, reaffirming its strategic alliance with the Church of Rome (Epistle 2)

The Diocletianic Persecutions extended from 303 to 311 in all territories of the Empire, except at this point those under the jurisdiction of Maxentius – the Roman empire's last, largest, and bloodiest official persecution of Christianity. Constantine came to power in 311 after defeating Maxentius at the Milvian bridge, where Maxentius drowned.

Maxentius was a prolific builder, whose achievements were overshadowed by Constantine's issue of a damnatio memoriae against him. Many buildings in Rome that are commonly associated with Constantine, such as the great basilica in the forum Romanum, were in fact built by Maxentius.

=== Discovery of Imperial insignia ===
In December 2006, Italian archaeologists announced that an excavation under a shrine near the Palatine Hill had unearthed several items in wooden boxes, which they identified as the imperial regalia, possibly belonging to Maxentius. The items in these boxes, which were wrapped in linen and what appears to be silk, include three complete lances, four javelins, what appears to be a base for standards, and three glass and chalcedony spheres. The most important find was a sceptre of a flower holding a blue-green globe, which is believed to have belonged to the Emperor himself because of its intricate workmanship, and has been dated to his rule.

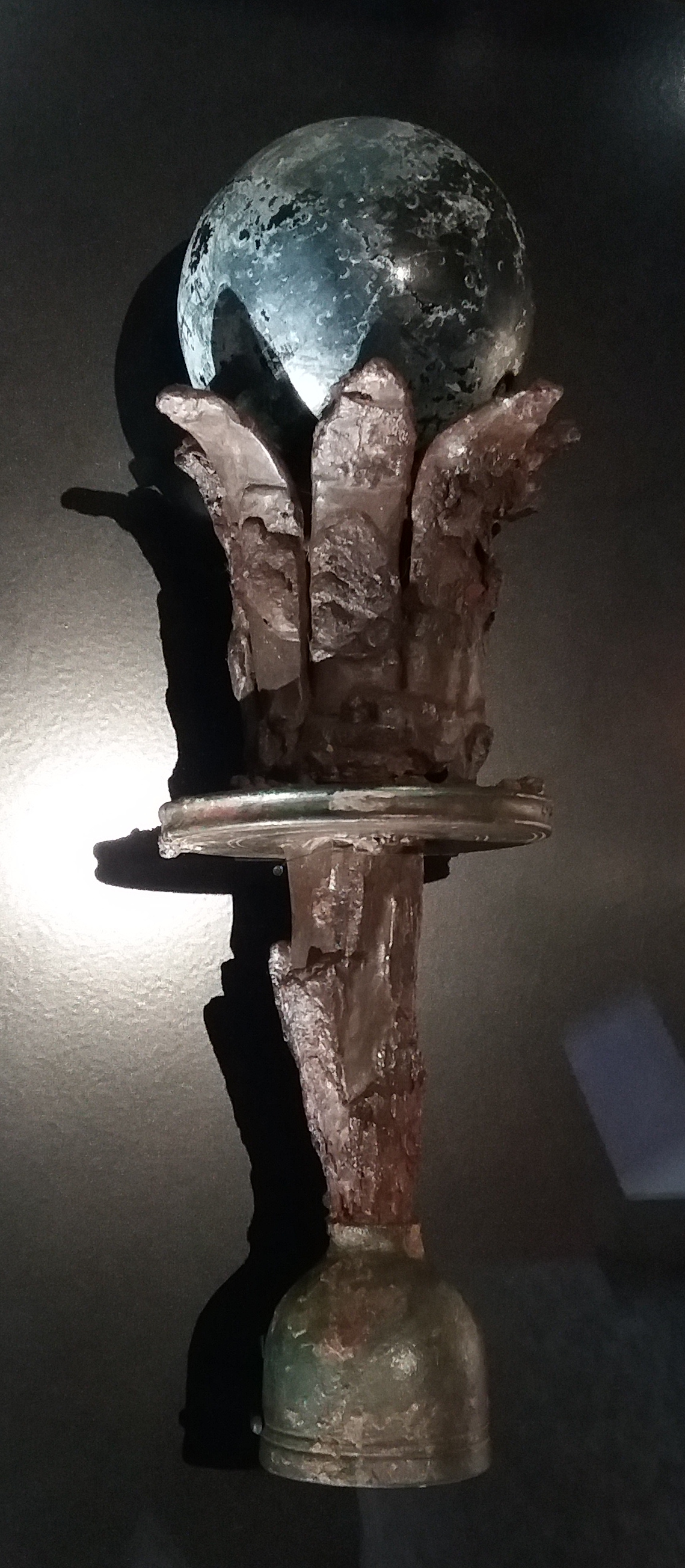

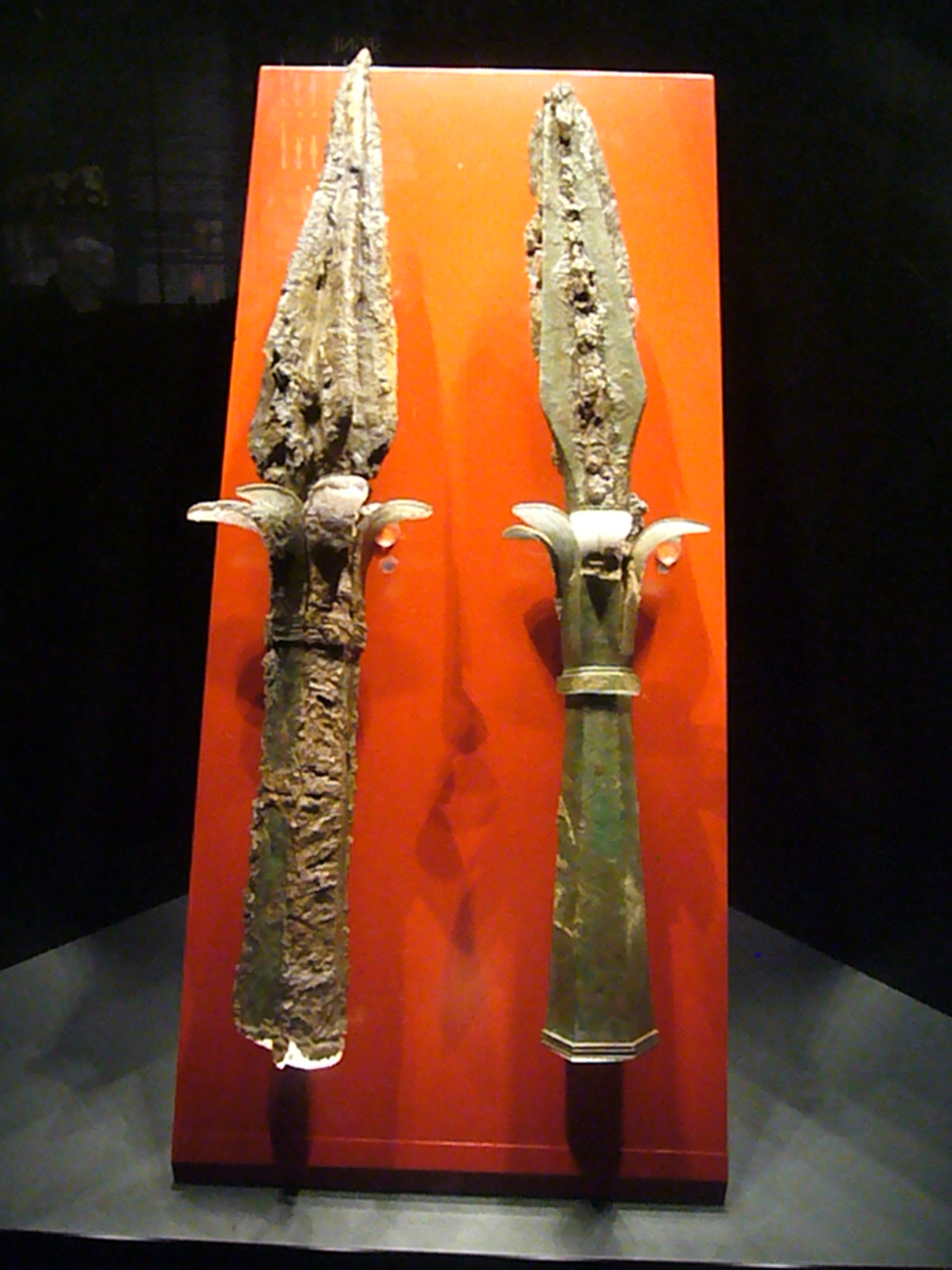

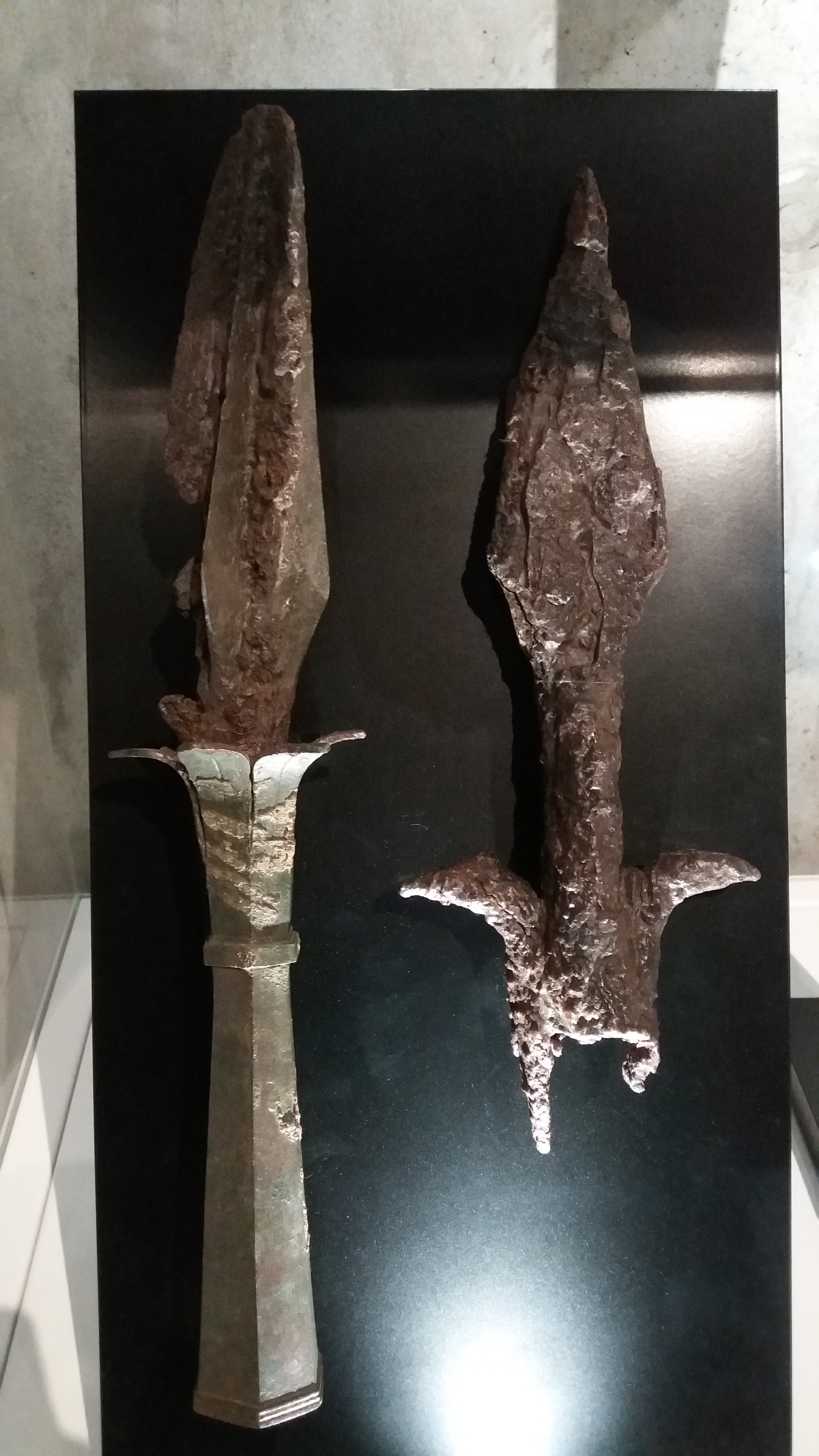

These are the only known imperial insignia so far recovered, which hitherto had only been known from representations on coins and in relief sculptures. Clementina Panella, the archaeologist who made the discovery, states that "These artifacts clearly belonged to the emperor, especially the sceptre, which is very elaborate. It's not an item you would let someone else have." Panella notes that the insignia were likely hidden by Maxentius' supporters in an attempt to preserve the emperor's memory after he was defeated at the Battle of the Milvian Bridge by Constantine. The items have been restored and are on temporary display at the Museo Nazionale Romano at the Palazzo Massimo alle Terme.

== Family tree ==
Simplified family tree of Tetrarchs

(See also: Chronological scheme of the Tetrarchy, 286–324)

DIOCLETIAN; Iovius; Eastern Emperor; 286–305	Prisca	Afranius Hannibalianus (disputed) (Note: Timothy Barnes (New Empire, 33–34) questions the parentage of Theodora shown here. He proposes that Maximian is her natural father (and that her mother is possibly a daughter of Afranius Hannibalianus). Substituting Afranicus Hannibalianus and switching the positions of Maximian and Eutropia would produce a diagram that matches the alternative lineage.) consul 292	Eutropia	Maximian; Herculius; Western Emperor; 286–305
Unknown sister	Galerius; Eastern Emperor; 305-311	Galeria Valeria	Helena	Constantius I Western Emperor; 305–306; Constantinian Dynasty	Flavia Maximiana Theodora	Severus II; Western Emperor; 306–307
Maximinus II; Eastern Emperor; 310–313	Valeria Maximilla	Maxentius; Western Emperor; 306–312	Fausta	Constantine I Roman Emperor; 306–337	Julius Constantius consul 335	Flavia Julia Constantia	Licinius I Western then Eastern Emperor; 308–324	Martinian; Eastern Emperor; 324	Valens I Eastern Emperor; 316–317
Valerius Romulus	Constantine II; Western Emperor; 337–340	Constantius II; Emperor; 337–361	Constans I Middle then Western Emperor; 337–350	Julian II; Emperor; 361–363	Licinius II caesar

Notes:

Bibliography:

- Barnes, Timothy D. The New Empire of Diocletian and Constantine. Cambridge, MA: Harvard University Press, 1982. ISBN 0-7837-2221-4

== In culture ==
- The Battle of the Milvian Bridge, 1520s fresco by Giulio Romano in the Apostolic Palace, Vatican.
- Maxentius is the main antagonist of the 1961 film Constantine and the Cross. The character is played by Massimo Serato.
- Maxentius is portrayed in the 5th episode of Ancient Rome: The Rise and Fall of an Empire.
- In the 2014 film Katherine of Alexandria, Maxentius was portrayed by Julien Vialon.

== Sources ==
- Alföldi, Andrew. The Conversion of Constantine and Pagan Rome. Translated by Harold Mattingly. Oxford: Clarendon Press, 1948.
- Barnes, Timothy D. Constantine and Eusebius. Cambridge, MA: Harvard University Press, 1981. ISBN 978-0-674-16531-1
- Barnes, Timothy D. The New Empire of Diocletian and Constantine. Cambridge, MA: Harvard University Press, 1982. ISBN 0-7837-2221-4
- Drijvers, Jan Willem. "Eusebius' Vita Constantini and the Construction of the Image of Maxentius." In From Rome to Constantinople: Studies in Honour of Averil Cameron, edited by Hagit Amirav and Bas ter Haar Romeny, 11–28. Leuven and Dudley, MA: Peeters, 2006. ISBN 978-90-429-1971-6
- Elliott, T. G. The Christianity of Constantine the Great. Scranton, PA: University of Scranton Press, 1996. ISBN 0-940866-59-5
- Lenski, Noel, ed. The Cambridge Companion to the Age of Constantine. New York: Cambridge University Press, 2006. Hardcover ISBN 0-521-81838-9 Paperback ISBN 0-521-52157-2
- Leppin, Hartmut and Hauke Ziemssen. Maxentius. Der letzte Kaiser in Rom (Zaberns Bildbände zur Archäologie). Mainz: Zabern, 2007.
- Odahl, Charles Matson. Constantine and the Christian Empire. New York: Routledge, 2004. Hardcover ISBN 0-415-17485-6 Paperback ISBN 0-415-38655-1
- Panella, C. et al. 2011. I segni del potere: realtà e immaginario della sovranità nella Roma imperiale. Bari: Edipuglia. ISBN 978-8872286166.
- Potter, David S. The Roman Empire at Bay: AD 180–395. New York: Routledge, 2005. Hardcover ISBN 0-415-10057-7 Paperback ISBN 0-415-10058-5
- Southern, Pat. The Roman Empire from Severus to Constantine. New York: Routledge, 2001. ISBN 0-415-23944-3

Political offices
Preceded by Maximian, Constantine I, Valerius Severus, Maximinus Daza, Galerius	Roman consul 308–310 with Valerius Romulus, Diocletian, Galerius; Licinius, Constantine I, Tatius Andronicus, Pompeius Probus	Succeeded by Galerius, Maximinus Daza, G. Ceionius Rufius Volusianus, Aradius Rufinus
Preceded by Galerius, Maximinus Daza, G. Ceionius Rufius Volusianus, Aradius Rufinus	Roman consul 312 with Constantine I, Licinius	Succeeded by Constantine I, Licinius, Maximinus Daza
