= Pompeius Probus =

Roman senator

Pompeius Probus (fl. 307–314) was a politician of the Roman Empire during the Tetrarchy, active at the Eastern court under Emperors Galerius and Licinius.

== Life ==
Probus was a member of the Petronii Probi, a family of the senatorial aristocracy. His son Petronius Probianus was consul in 322, and his granddaughter was the poet Faltonia Proba.

Around 307 Probus was sent by Galerius as an envoy to Maxentius, together with Licinius. Between 310 and 314 he was appointed Praetorian prefect of the East. Since he was a man of the Eastern court, his appointment to the consulship, in 310, was not recognised either by Maxentius, who controlled Rome, or by Constantine I, who ruled over Gaul, and was thus effective only in the East.

== Sources ==
- Martindale, John R.; Jones, A. H. M.; Morris, John, eds. (1971). "Pompeius Probus 6". The Prosopography of the Later Roman Empire: Volume I, AD 260–395. Cambridge: Cambridge University Press. p. 740. ISBN 0-521-07233-6.
- Lieu, Samuel N., and Dominic Montserrat eds., From Constantine to Julian: A Source History, Routledge, 1995, ISBN 0-415-09335-X, p. 53.

Political offices
Preceded by Licinius , Constantine I, Maxentius, Valerius Romulus	Roman consul 310 with Tatius Andronicus, Maxentius	Succeeded by Galerius, Maximinus Daza, Gaius Caeionius Rufius Volusianus, Aradius Rufinus
