= Domitius Alexander =

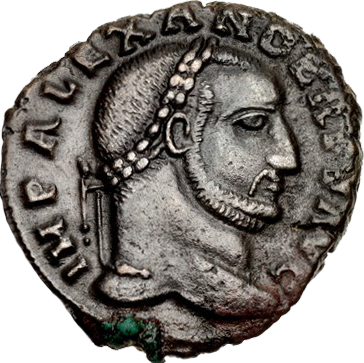
- Follis of Domitius Alexander minted in Carthage

Roman emperor
- Reign: 308–310 (against Maxentius)
- Predecessor: Maxentius
- Successor: Maxentius
- Born: Phrygia (now Central Anatolia, Turkey)
- Died: c. 310; Africa
Names
- Lucius Domitius Alexander
Regnal name
- Imperator Caesar Lucius Domitius Alexander Augustus

Lucius Domitius Alexander (Note: He is rarely enumerated as Alexander II, with Severus Alexander being Alexander I and Alexander being Alexander III) (died c. 310), was a Roman emperor from 308 to 310 during the time of the Tetrarchy. Prior to usurping the title he was vicarius of Africa.

The most detailed if somewhat confusing description of the insurrection is given by Zosimus (II, 12 and 14). He reports that Maxentius sent his portrait to Africa to gain recognition as Emperor there. The troops resisted because of their loyalty to Galerius. Maxentius ordered Domitius Alexander, the vicar of Africa, to send his son to Rome to secure his loyalty. Alexander refused and was proclaimed Emperor by his army. The incident was probably caused by the conflict between Maxentius and his father Maximian in April 308, and Zosimos confused Galerius with Maximian in his account.

Apart from the provinces in north Africa (today's Algeria, Tunisia and western Libya), Alexander also controlled Sardinia. One inscription from Sicca, modern day El Kef, bears the name of both Alexander and Constantine I as emperors, which may imply some kind of alliance, although this is uncertain. Salama suggests that, at the latest, the possible pact was entered into by autumn of 310. According to Noel Emmanuel Lenski, Constantine "seems to have offered [his support], albeit very cautiously, in a bid to keep pressure on Maxentius". The usurpation, which coincided with Constantine's recognition as Augustus, effectively ruined the Tetrarchic power balance as there was now 5 Augusti and only 1 Caesar.

Maxentius sent his praetorian prefect Rufius Volusianus and a certain Zenas to quell the rebellion, and Alexander was taken prisoner and then executed by strangulation. Apparently, his troops did not offer much resistance. Maxentius retaliated with confiscations of the property of alleged supporters of Alexander. The year of the end of Alexander's reign is subject to debate, although it was certainly in either late 309 or early 310.
