= Antonio Nibby =

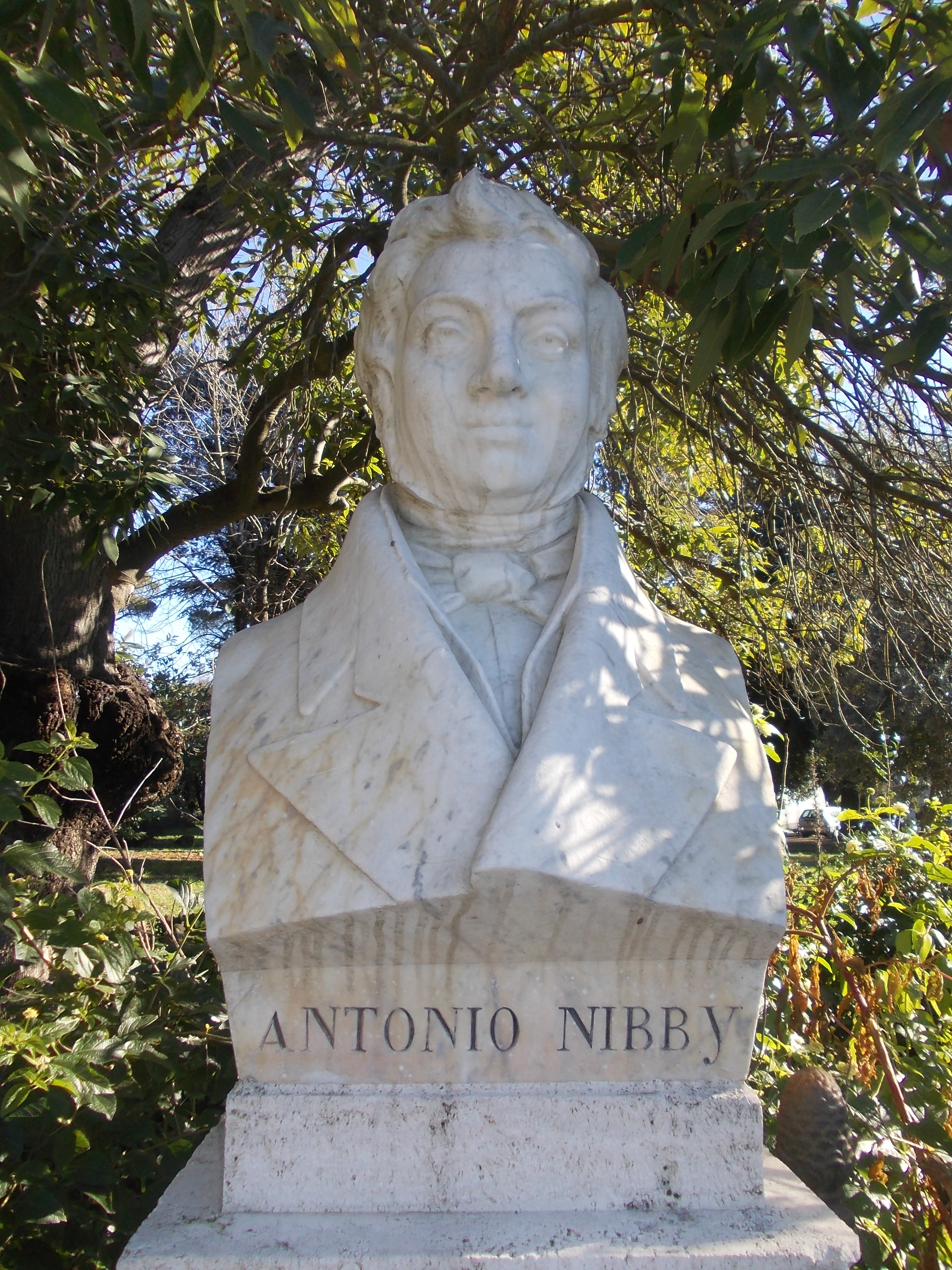
- Bust of Antonio Nibby
- Born: 1792; Rome, Papal States (now Italy)
- Died: 1839 (aged 46–47); Rome, Papal States
- Known for: Roman topography
- Scientific career
- Fields: Archaeology
- Workplaces: Sapienza University of Rome

Antonio Nibby (October 4, 1792 at Rome – December 29, 1839 at Rome) was an Italian archaeologist and topographer. Nibby was a professor of archaeology in the University of Rome and in the French Academy in Rome. He was an expert in the topography of ancient Rome and its hinterland. Nibby excavated in the area of the Forum Romanum from 1827, and cleared the Cloaca Maxima in 1829.

== Biography ==
Antonio Nibby was born in Rome on October 4, 1792. He was the founder of the Accademia Ellenica in 1809 and of the Accademia Tiberina in 1814, and was a member of numerous Italian and foreign scientific academies and institutes (fellow and censor of the Pontifical Academy of Archaeology and of the Accademia di San Luca, correspondent of the Institut de France and the Turin Academy of Fine Arts etc.).

Nibby was a critic of the history of ancient art and from 1812 in service to the Vatican worked to excavate the monuments of Rome. He also served as a secretary to Louis Bonaparte, Count of Saint-Leu.

In 1820 he succeeded his first master, Lorenzo Re, as the Public Professor of Archaeology at the Sapienza University of Rome. From 1817, when he published his first work Saggio di osservazioni critiche geografiche together with a translation of Pausanias' Description of Greece, his activity as an archaeologist and topographer was always based on the comparative study of sources and Classical monuments.

In 1819 he identified two Roman monuments and published Del Tempio della Pace e della Basilica di Constantino, and he recognized the cultural origins of numerous Greek and Roman sculptures, including the Dying Gaul (Rome, Capitoline Museums), on which he wrote an essay (1821). In 1825 he located the Villa of Maxentius and the city of Satricum.

For a few years Nibby worked together with the British archaeologist William Gell and together they published a study on the walls of Rome in 1820. They had plans of publishing a study on the topography of the Roman Campagna, but they ended up publishing separately.

In 1827 Nibby succeeded Carlo Fea in the excavation of the south-west part of the Roman Forum. He took up and continued the methodological approach of his predecessor, aiming to discover the urban structure of the area rather than merely to recover antique objects and materials. He had a wide knowledge and a lively interest in the monuments of Rome and the surrounding countryside, and gave exact documentation of his research in numerous essays and scientific lectures; these are still admirable for their precision and wealth of information. He also revised and amplified Mariano Vasi's Itinerario istruttivo di Roma antica e moderna.

== Bibliography ==
- 1819. Viaggio antiquatio nei dintorni di Roma.
- 1819. Che contiene il viaggio a Frascati, Tusculo, Algido, Grottoferrato, alle valle Ferentina, al lago Albano, ad Alba, Aricia, Nemi, Lanavio, Cora, Anzio, Lacinio, Ardea, Ostia, Laurentia e Porto. (Rome).
- 1820. Le Mura di Roma disegnate da Sir W. Gell, illustrate con testo note da A. Nibby. (Rome).
- 1825. Il tempio della Fortuna Prenestina ristaurato da Costantino Thon. (Rome).
- 1827. A map of the Rome's surroundings with the comments and an historical /topographical analysis of ancient Rome.
- 1830. Itinerario di Roma e delle sue vicinanze / compilato da Antonio Nibby secondo il methodo del Vasi. (Rome).
- 1837. Analisi storico-topografico-antiquaria della carta de' Dintorni di Roma (Rome), 3 vols.
- Roma nell'anno 1838, 4 vols.
