= Valerius Romulus =

Son of Roman Emperor Maxentius (died 309)

Divus Valerius Romulus
- Marcus Aurelius Valerius Romulus
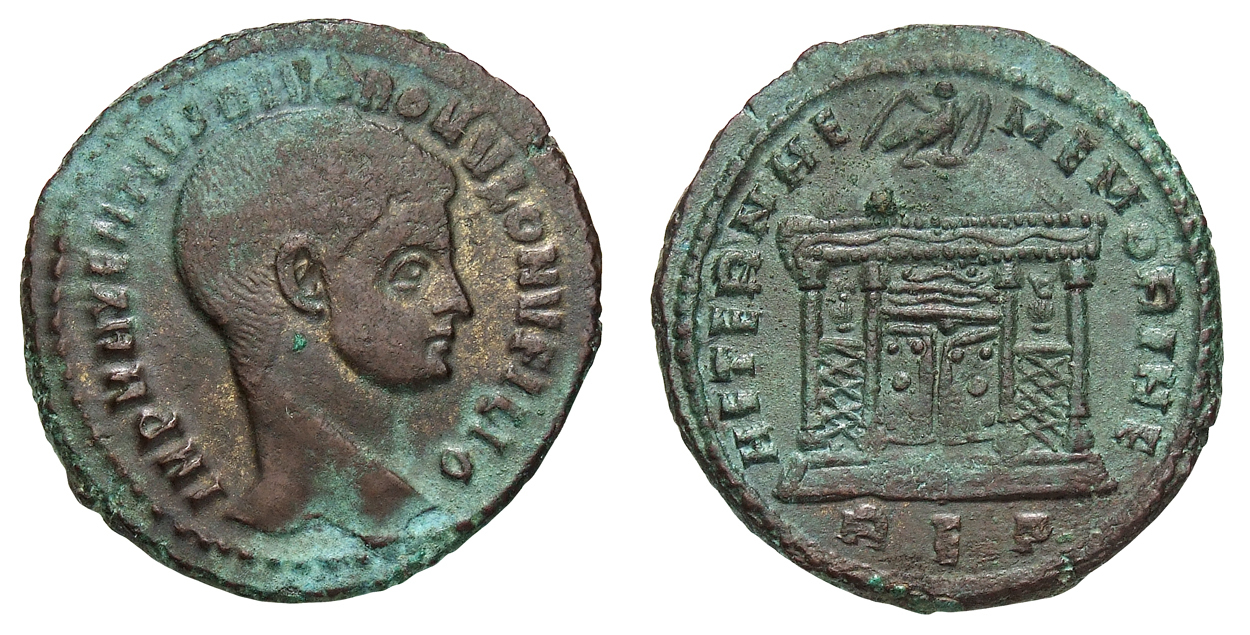
- Born: 295 (possibly)
- Died: 309
- Era: Tetrarchy
- Parent(s): Valeria Maximilla; Maxentius
- Relatives: Maximian; Galerius (grandfathers); Unnamed brother
- Honours: Consecratio

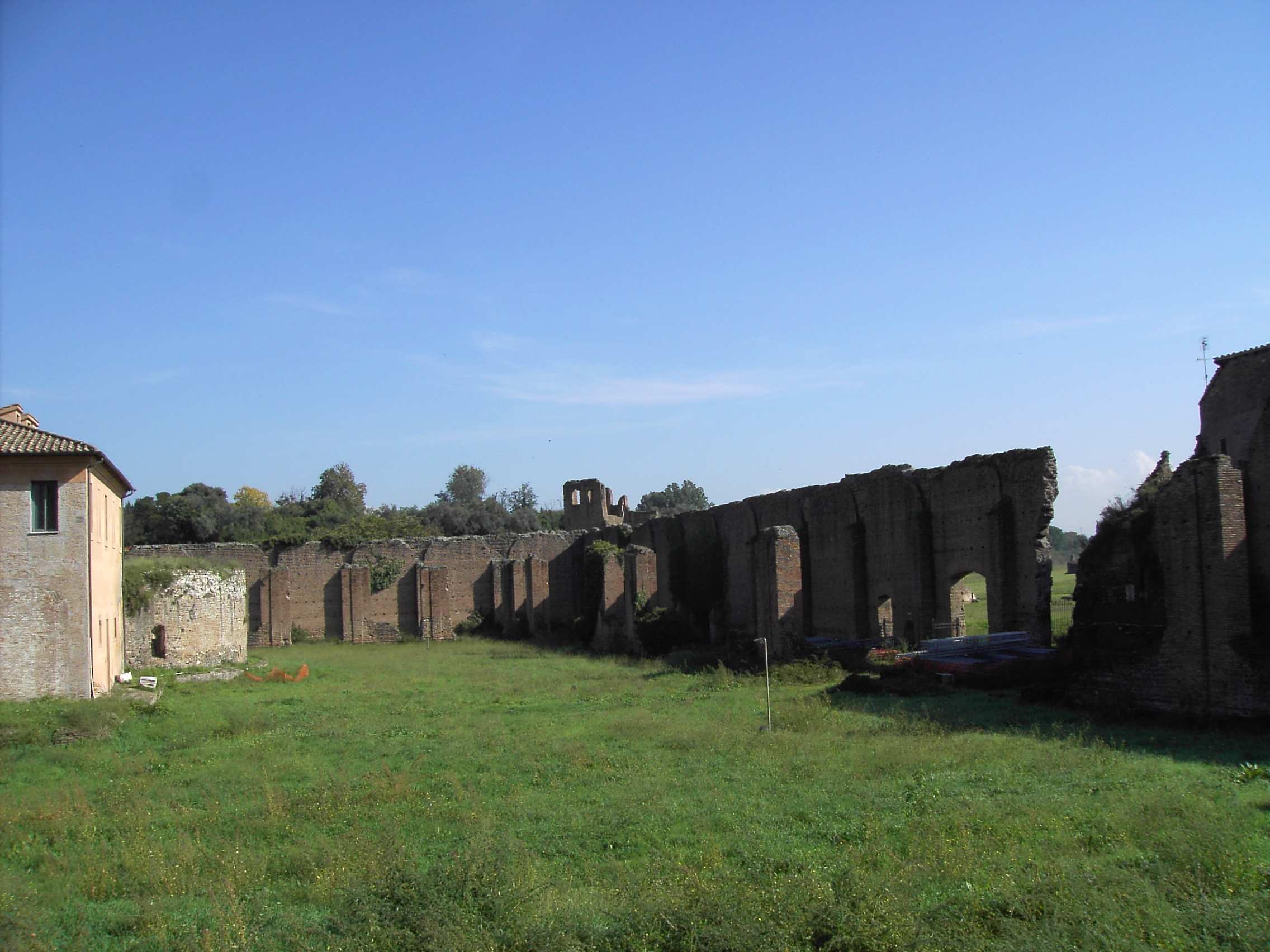
Tomb of Romulus along the Via Appia.

Marcus Aurelius Valerius Romulus (died 309), was the son of Emperor Maxentius and of Valeria Maximilla, daughter of Emperor Galerius by his first wife. Through his father, he was also grandson of Maximian the Tetrarch, whom he predeceased.

== Biography ==
Valerius bore the title clarissimus puer in his youth, and later nobilissimus vir. He was consul with his father in 308 and 309; the fact that Maxentius was the only consul for year 310 suggests that Valerius died in 309. He was buried in a tomb along the Via Appia. After death, his status was raised to Divus and his father dedicated the Temple of Divus Romulus to him along the Via Sacra near the Roman Forum. Also, a series of commemorative coins was issued in his name, showing a domed shrine with one of the doors ajar, and an eagle on top.

== Sources ==
- DiMaio, Michael, "Maxentius (306–312 A.D.)", De Imperatoribus Romanis

Political offices
Preceded by Maximian, Constantine I, Flavius Valerius Severus, Maximinus Daza, Galerius	Roman consul 308-309 with Maxentius, Diocletian, Galerius, Licinius, Constantine I	Succeeded by Tatius Andronicus, Pompeius Probus, Maxentius
