= Maximinus Daza =

Roman emperor from 310 to 313

Maximinus II Daza
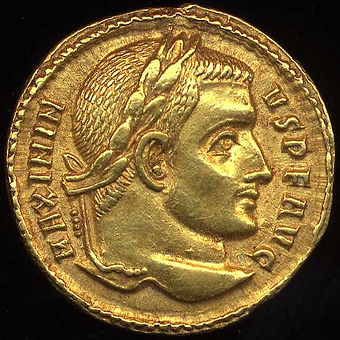
- Coin of Maximinus, with the legend: Maximinus p(ius) f(elix) aug(ustus)

Roman emperor
- Augustus: 310 – July 313
- Predecessor: Galerius
- Successor: Licinius
- Co-rulers: Constantine I (West); Maxentius (West)
- Caesar: 1 May 305 – 310
- Born: Daza; 20 November c. 270 near Felix Romuliana, Roman Dacia, Roman Empire
- Died: c. July 313 (aged c. 42); Tarsus, Cilicia Prima, Roman Empire
- Issue: 2 + others
Names
- Galerius Valerius Maximinus
- Father: Galerius (adoptive)
- Mother: Sister of Galerius
- Religion: Ancient Roman religion

Maximinus II (Latin: Galerius Valerius Maximinus; Ancient Greek: Μαξιμίνος; 20 November c. 270 – c. July 313), born Daza, was Roman emperor from 310 to 313. In 305 his uncle Galerius admitted him to the Tetrarchy with the rank of caesar, a controversial appointment which helped start the civil wars of the Tetrarchy in the following year. Maximinus Daza claimed the title of augustus in 310, sharing and often contesting power with Licinius. A committed pagan, he engaged in one of the last persecutions of Christians, and was the last person to hold the title of Pharaoh of Egypt. In 313 Maximinus Daza openly turned against Licinius and was routed at the Battle of Tzirallum. He died during the subsequent retreat, shortly after publishing an edict of tolerance restoring the Christians' freedoms.

== Name ==
The emperor Maximinus was originally called "Daza", an ancient name with various unknown high distinction meanings in Illyria, where he was born. The form "Daia" given by the Christian writer Lactantius, an important source on the emperor's life, is considered a misspelling. He acquired the name "Maximinus" at the request of his maternal uncle, Galerius (a Roman emperor of Dacian origin). (Note: Galerius' original cognomen was "Maximinus".) Modern scholarship often refers to him as "Maximinus Daza", though this particular form is not attested by epigraphic or literary evidence.

== Early career ==
Maximinus was born in Felix Romuliana (located within modern Serbia). In 305, his maternal uncle Galerius became the eastern Augustus and adopted Maximinus, who had risen to high distinction in the Roman army, as a son and heir, giving to him the rank of Caesar (that is, the junior eastern ruler), with jurisdiction in Syria and Egypt.

== Civil war ==
In 308, after the elevation of Licinius to Augustus, Maximinus and Constantine I were declared filii Augustorum ("sons of the Augusti"), but Maximinus probably started styling himself as Augustus with support of his troops during a campaign against the Sassanids in 310. Galerius died in 311, and Maximinus divided the Eastern Empire between Licinius and himself. Maximinus, who was already married, proposed to divorce his wife and marry Galerius' daughter Valeria; when Valeria refused he confiscated her and her mother's property and exiled them to Syria.

When Licinius and Constantine I began to make common cause, Maximinus entered into a secret alliance with the usurper Maxentius, who controlled Italy. He came to an open rupture with Licinius in 313; on 30 April the two rivals fought the Battle of Tzirallum in the neighbourhood of Heraclea Perinthus. Maximinus' 70,000-man army sustained a crushing defeat and he fled, first to Nicomedia and afterwards to Tarsus, where he died the following August.

== Persecution of Christians ==
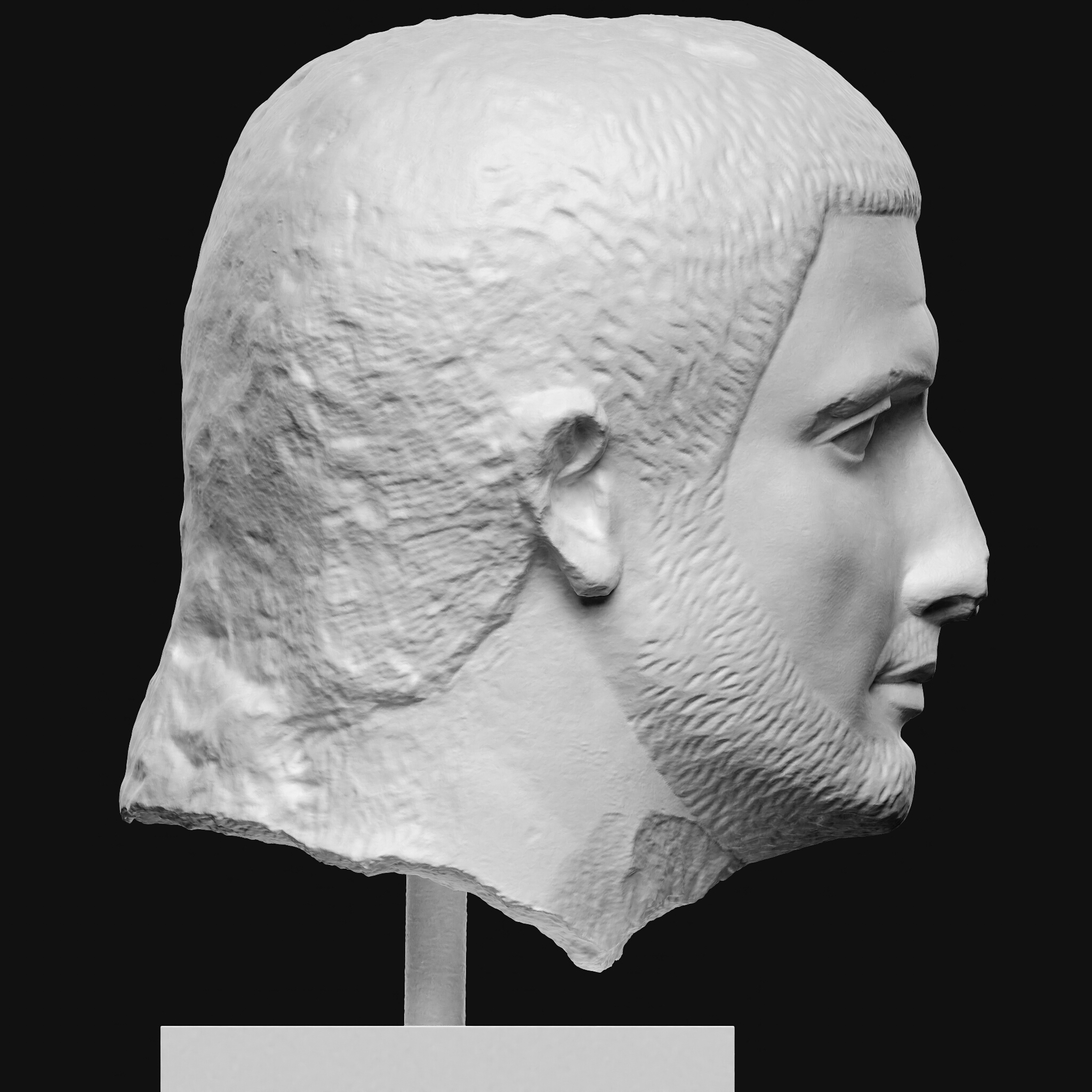
Plaster cast of a colossal tetrarchic portrait head, perhaps depicting Maximinus

Maximinus has a controversial name in Christian annals for renewing their persecution after the publication of the Edict of Toleration by Galerius, acting in response to the demands of various urban authorities asking to expel Christians. In one rescript replying to a petition made by the inhabitants of Tyre, transcribed by Eusebius of Caesarea, Maximinus expounds a pagan orthodoxy, explaining that it is through "the kindly care of the gods" that one could hope for good crops, health, and the peaceful sea, and that not being the case, one should blame "the destructive error of the empty vanity of those impious men [that] weighed down the whole world with shame". In one extant inscription (CIL III.12132, from Arycanda) from the cities of Lycia and Pamphylia asking for the interdiction of the Christians, Maximinus replied, in another inscription, by expressing his hope that "may those [...] who, after being freed from [...] those by-ways [...] rejoice [as] snatched from a grave illness".

After the victory of Constantine over Maxentius, however, Maximinus wrote to the Praetorian Prefect Sabinus that it was better to "recall our provincials to the worship of the gods rather by exhortations and flatteries". Eventually, on the eve of his clash with Licinius, he accepted Galerius' edict; after being defeated by Licinius, shortly before his death at Tarsus, he issued an edict of tolerance on his own, granting Christians the rights of assembling, of building churches, and the restoration of their confiscated properties.

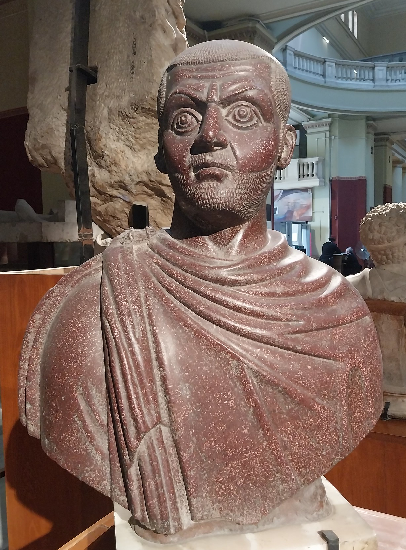
Porphyry bust of a tetrarch from Athribis, and now in the Cairo Museum. The bust is labelled as Maximinus, but this cannot be confirmed. It probably depicts Galerius instead.

== Pharaoh of Egypt ==
Cartouche of Maximinus Daza, Kaisaros Oualerios Mak(sim)inos

As Christianity continued to spread in Egypt, the title of Pharaoh was increasingly incompatible with the new religious movements. Maximinus's status as a non-Christian accorded the priests of Egypt an opportunity to style him as Pharaoh, in the same manner that other foreign rulers of Egypt had been styled before. That said, the Roman emperors' role as god-kings was only ever acknowledged domestically by the Egyptians, being largely ignored by the emperors themselves. Maximinus would prove to be the last person afforded the traditional titulature of Pharaoh – no Christian Roman/Byzantine emperor, nor Islamic or modern leader, has revived the title since. As the last monarch to employ traditional pharaonic titulature, Maximinus' death can be seen as marking the end of a 3,400-year-old office.

== Death ==
Maximinus' death was variously ascribed "to despair, to poison, and to the divine justice".

Based on descriptions of his death given by Eusebius, and Lactantius as well as the appearance of Graves' ophthalmopathy in a Tetrarchic statue bust from Anthribis in Egypt sometimes attributed to Maximinus, endocrinologist Peter D. Papapetrou has advanced a theory that Maximinus may have died from severe thyrotoxicosis due to Graves' disease.

Maximinus was married at the time of his death, and he left behind an 8 year old son named Maximus and a 7 year old daughter whose name is unknown. They were both executed by Licinius.

== Eusebius on Maximinus ==
The Christian writer Eusebius claims that Maximinus was consumed by avarice and superstition. He also allegedly lived a highly dissolute lifestyle:

And he went to such an excess of folly and drunkenness that his mind was deranged and crazed in his carousals; and he gave commands when intoxicated of which he repented afterward when sober. He suffered no one to surpass him in debauchery and profligacy, but made himself an instructor in wickedness to those about him, both rulers and subjects. He urged on the army to live wantonly in every kind of revelry and intemperance, and encouraged the governors and generals to abuse their subjects with rapacity and covetousness, almost as if they were rulers with him.
Why need we relate the licentious, shameless deeds of the man, or enumerate the multitude with whom he committed adultery? For he could not pass through a city without continually corrupting women and ravishing virgins.

According to Eusebius, only Christians resisted him.

For the men endured fire and sword and crucifixion and wild beasts and the depths of the sea, and cutting off of limbs, and burnings, and pricking and digging out of eyes, and mutilations of the entire body, and besides these, hunger and mines and bonds. In all they showed patience in behalf of religion rather than transfer to idols the reverence due to God. And the women were not less manly than the men in behalf of the teaching of the Divine Word, as they endured conflicts with the men, and bore away equal prizes of virtue. And when they were dragged away for corrupt purposes, they surrendered their lives to death rather than their bodies to impurity.

He refers to one high-born Christian woman who rejected his advances. He exiled her and seized all of her wealth and assets. Eusebius does not give the girl a name, but Tyrannius Rufinus calls her "Dorothea," and writes that she fled to Arabia. This story may have evolved into the legend of Dorothea of Alexandria. Caesar Baronius identified the girl in Eusebius' account with Catherine of Alexandria, but the Bollandists rejected this theory. Given Maximinus's previous persecutions of Christians, there is doubt as to the credibility of Eusebius.

== Family tree ==
Simplified family tree of Tetrarchs

(See also: Chronological scheme of the Tetrarchy, 286–324)

DIOCLETIAN; Iovius; Eastern Emperor; 286–305	Prisca	Afranius Hannibalianus (disputed) (Note: Timothy Barnes (New Empire, 33–34) questions the parentage of Theodora shown here. He proposes that Maximian is her natural father (and that her mother is possibly a daughter of Afranius Hannibalianus). Substituting Afranicus Hannibalianus and switching the positions of Maximian and Eutropia would produce a diagram that matches the alternative lineage.) consul 292	Eutropia	Maximian; Herculius; Western Emperor; 286–305
Unknown sister	Galerius; Eastern Emperor; 305-311	Galeria Valeria	Helena	Constantius I Western Emperor; 305–306; Constantinian Dynasty	Flavia Maximiana Theodora	Severus II; Western Emperor; 306–307
Maximinus II; Eastern Emperor; 310–313	Valeria Maximilla	Maxentius; Western Emperor; 306–312	Fausta	Constantine I Roman Emperor; 306–337	Julius Constantius consul 335	Flavia Julia Constantia	Licinius I Western then Eastern Emperor; 308–324	Martinian; Eastern Emperor; 324	Valens I Eastern Emperor; 316–317
Valerius Romulus	Constantine II; Western Emperor; 337–340	Constantius II; Emperor; 337–361	Constans I Middle then Western Emperor; 337–350	Julian II; Emperor; 361–363	Licinius II caesar

Notes:

Bibliography:

- Barnes, Timothy D. The New Empire of Diocletian and Constantine. Cambridge, MA: Harvard University Press, 1982. ISBN 0-7837-2221-4

== See also ==
- List of Roman emperors
- Civil wars of the Tetrarchy

== Sources ==
- Barnes, Timothy D. (1981). Constantine and Eusebius. Cambridge, MA: Harvard University Press. ISBN 978-0-674-16531-1.
- Barnes, Timothy D. (1982). The New Empire of Diocletian and Constantine. Cambridge, MA: Harvard University Press. ISBN 0-674-28066-0.
- Barnes, Timothy D. (2011). Constantine: Dynasty, Religion and Power in the Later Roman Empire. Chichester: Wiley-Blackwell. ISBN 978-1-4051-1727-2.
- Berchman, Robert M. (2005). Porphyry Against the Christians. BRILL. ISBN 9004148116.
- DiMaio, Michael (2022). "Maximinus Daia (305–313 A.D.)". De Imperatoribus Romanis. Archived from the original on 28 May 2023.
- Leadbetter, Bill (2010). Galerius and the Will of Diocletian. London: Routledge. ISBN 978-0-415-40488-4.
- Mackay, Christopher S. (1999). "Lactantius and the Succession to Diocletian". Classical Philology. 94 (2): 198–209. doi:10.1086/449431. JSTOR 270559. S2CID 161141658.
- Sear, David (2011). Roman Coins and Their Values. Vol. 4. Spink & Son, Ltd. ISBN 978-1907427077.
- This article incorporates text from a publication now in the public domain: Chisholm, Hugh, ed. (1911). "Maximinus, Galerius Valerius". Encyclopædia Britannica. Vol. 17 (11th ed.). Cambridge University Press. p. 925.

Regnal titles
Preceded by Galerius; Constantine I	Roman emperor 310–313 with Galerius, Constantine I and Licinius	Succeeded by Constantine I and Licinius
Political offices
Preceded by Constantius I Galerius	Roman consul 307 with Maximian, Constantine I, Severus II, Galerius	Succeeded by Diocletian; Galerius; Maxentius; Valerius Romulus
Preceded by Tatius Andronicus; Pompeius Probus; Maxentius	Roman consul II; 311 with Galerius, G. Ceionius Rufius Volusianus, Aradius Rufinus	Succeeded by Constantine I Licinius; Maxentius
Preceded by Constantine I Licinius; Maxentius	Roman consul III; 313 with Constantine I, Licinius	Succeeded by G. Ceionius Rufius Volusianus; Petronius Annianus
