= 340s =

Decade

The 340s decade ran from January 1, 340, to December 31, 349.

== Events ==
=== 340 ===
==== By place ====
====== Roman Empire ======
- Constantinople, capital of Emperor Constantius II, becomes the largest city in the world, taking the lead from Rome, capital of his brother Constans I.
- Constantine II, emperor of the western part of the Roman Empire (Britain, Gaul, the Rhine provinces and Iberia), crosses the Alps and attacks the army of his brother Constans I, emperor of the central part of the Roman Empire (Upper Danube, Italy and middle Africa). They clash at Aquileia in northern Italy. Constantine is killed in a skirmish by an ambush of Constans' troops.
- Constans is left sole ruler of the Western part of the Roman Empire, with his other brother, Constantius II, emperor of the Eastern portion.

==== By topic ====
====== Religion ======
- Acacius succeeds Eusebius as bishop in the see of Caesarea.
- Wulfila evangelizes among the Goths for 7 years.

=== 341 ===
==== By place ====
====== Roman Empire ======
- Emperor Constans I bans pagan sacrifices and magic rituals, under penalty of death.
- Constans I begins a successful campaign against the Franks.

====== India ======
- Samudragupta of the Gupta Empire, during a decade, extends his kingdom and his influence. A pillar found at Allahabad sings his praises.

==== By topic ====
====== Religion ======
- The Council of Encaenia is held in Antioch.
- Paul I is restored as Patriarch of Constantinople.
- Thousands of Christians are executed at Seleucia in Mesopotamia.
- Coptic Christianity is introduced into Ethiopia by the Syrian apostle Frumentius. He and his colleague Aedesius ware captured by Ethiopians a year or two ago, and have become civil servants at the Aksumite court of King Ezana. Ezana is impressed with Frumentius' teachings and converts to Christianity. Frumentius becomes the first Bishop of Axum and encourages the Christian merchants present in the country to practise their faith openly.

=== 342 ===
==== By place ====
====== Roman Empire ======
- Emperor Constans I campaigns in Britain against the Picts.
- Constans campaigns victoriously against the Franks.

====== Asia ======
- A large earthquake strikes Cyprus.
- Goguryeo is invaded by Murong Huang of the Xianbei.
- Jin Kangdi succeeds his brother Jin Chengdi as emperor of China.

==== By topic ====
====== Religion ======
- Paul I, Patriarch of Constantinople, is deposed and replaced by Macedonius I.
- February 15 – The original Hagia Sophia is dedicated in Constantinople.

=== 343 ===
==== By place ====
====== Roman Empire ======
- The Western Roman Emperor Constans I is in Britain, possibly in a military campaign against the Picts and Scots. The last visit to Britain by a legitimate emperor.
- The Eastern Roman Emperor Constantius II campaigns in Adiabene, a vassal kingdom of Armenia (Persian Empire).

==== By topic ====
====== Religion ======
- Pope Julius I tries to unite the Western bishops against Arianism by convoking the Council of Serdica (later Sofia), which acknowledges the pope's supreme authority and grants him the right to judge cases involving the legal possession of episcopal sees, but only Western and Egyptian bishops attend, and Arianism remains strong.

=== 344 ===
==== By place ====
====== Roman Empire ======
- The Eastern Roman Emperor Constantius II campaigns in eastern Mesopotamia, against the Sassanid Persians.
- Battle of Singara: The Roman army under Constantius wins a close victory, at the strongly fortified city of Singara (Mesopotamia). His enemy, King Shapur II, is forced to lift the siege, and withdraw the Persian army.
- Shapur II, for the second time, besieges the Roman fortress of Nisibis in eastern Mesopotamia, but is repulsed by forces under General Lucilianus.

====== Asia ======
- Jin Mudi, age 1, succeeds his father Jin Kangdi as emperor of China. His mother, Empress Dowager Chu, becomes the ruling authority at court, and serves as regent.
- Gye becomes king of the Korean kingdom of Baekje.

==== By topic ====
====== Art ======
- The making of a detail of Admonitions of the Imperial Instructress to Court Ladies (attributed to Gu Kaizhi and being from the Six Dynasties period) begins (approximate year) and is completed in 406. It is now kept at the British Museum, London.

====== Religion ======
- Bishop Eustorgius I brings relics of the Three Magi from Constantinople to Milan, according to a 12th century legend.

=== 345 ===
==== By place ====
====== India ======
- Merchant Knai Thomman and 400 followers visit the Malabar Coast in Kerala (India), and assist the church there.
- The Kadamba Dynasty is founded by Mayurasharma.

====== Italy ======
- Constans orders the Basilica di Santa Tecla to be constructed in Milan.

=== 346 ===
==== By place ====
====== Asia ======
- In Korea, the Buyeo Kingdom is absorbed by Goguryeo.
- Geunchogo becomes king of the Korean kingdom of Baekje.

==== By topic ====
====== Religion ======
- Emperor Constans I uses his influence to secure the return of Athanasius. He is restored as Patriarch of Alexandria, and documents are compiled relating to his expulsion, under the title Apology Against the Arians.
- Macedonius I, Patriarch of Constantinople, is deposed again by Paul I.
- Julius Firmicus Maternus writes De erroribus profanarum religionum.
- The Visigoths are converted to Arianism by Wulfila.

=== 347 ===
==== By place ====
====== China ======
- Li Shi, ruler of Cheng Han, fails in his attempt to halt a Jin expedition under Huan Wen. He flees to the capital Chengdu and surrenders his forces. Emperor Jin Mudi spares his life and makes him a marquess.

==== By topic ====
====== Religion ======
- Council of Sardica: An attempt is made to resolve the Arian controversy, and ground rules for bishops are laid down.
- The Council of Philippopolis is held as the result of Eastern bishops leaving the Council of Sardica. In Philippopolis (Bulgaria), they excommunicate Pope Julius, and as a result, the Arian controversy is perpetuated.

=== 348 ===
==== By place ====
====== Europe ======
- Wulfila escapes religious persecution by the Gothic chieftain Athanaric, obtains permission from Constantius II to migrate with his flock of converts to Moesia, and settle near Nicopolis ad Istrum (Bulgaria).

====== Asia ======
- In Persia, women are enrolled in the army to perform auxiliary services.
- In India, Samudragupta of the Gupta Empire defeats Rudrasena in battle.

=== 349 ===
==== By place ====
====== Asia ======
- After a brief reign of 183 days, Emperor Shi Zun and his mother Empress Zheng Yingtao are executed; his son Shi Jian succeeds him, as emperor of the Jie state Later Zhao.
- The Mou-jong (proto-Mongols) take control of North China.

== Significant people ==
- Constans, Roman Emperor
- Constantius II, Roman Emperor
- Flavius Philippus, praetorian prefect of the East, consul
- Hypatia of Alexandria

== Births ==
340

- Aurelius Ambrose, bishop of Milan (approximate date)
- Amphilochius, bishop of Iconium (approximate date)
- Jerome, priest and Bible translator (approximate date)
- Justina, Roman empress and regent (approximate date)
- Peter of Sebaste, bishop of Armenia (approximate date)
- Quintus Aurelius Symmachus, Roman consul (d. 402)

341

- Ai of Jin (or Qianling), Chinese emperor (d. 365)

342

- Fei of Jin (or Sima Yi), Chinese emperor (d. 386)

343

- Fu Deng, Chinese emperor of the Di state Former Qin (d. 394)
- Jin Mudi, Chinese emperor of the Eastern Jin Dynasty (d. 361)
- Xiao Wenshou (or Xiaoyi), Chinese empress dowager (d. 423)
- Xie Xuan, Chinese general of the Jin Dynasty (d. 388)

344

- Gu Kaizhi, Chinese painter (approximate date)
- Kumārajīva, Buddhist monk and translator (d. 413)
- Mary of Egypt, patron Saint (approximate date)
- Wang Xianzhi, Chinese calligrapher (d. 386)
- Zhang Yaoling, ruler of Former Liang (d. 355)

345

- Evagrius Ponticus, Christian monk and ascetic (d. 399)
- Afranius Syagrius, Roman politician and administrator
- Quintus Aurelius Symmachus, Roman consul and intellectual (d. 402)
- Tyrannius of Aquileia, historian and theologian (approximate date)

346

- Zhang Tianxi, Chinese ruler of Former Liang (d. 406)

347

- January 11 – Theodosius I, Roman Emperor (d. 395)
- March 27 – Saint Jerome, priest and translator of the Bible (approximate date)
- Eunapius, Greek sophist and historian
- John Chrysostom, archbishop of Constantinople (approximate date)
- Paula, Desert Mother and Saint (d. 404)
- Saint Porphyry, bishop of Gaza (approximate date)

348

- Prudentius, Roman Christian poet (d. 413)
- Shenoute, monk and saint (d. 466)

349

- John Chrysostom, archbishop of Constantinople (approximate date)

== Deaths ==
340

- October 28 – Cunera (or Kunera), Christian martyr
- Constantine II, Roman consul and emperor (b. 316)
- Kui An, Indian general and minister of Later Zhao
- Macrina the Elder, Christian saint (approximate date)
- Tao Bao (or Anbu), Chinese general of Later Zhao
- Yu Liang (or Yuangui), Chinese general (b. 279)

341

- Asterius of Cappadocia, Christian theologian and writer
- Du Lingyang (or Du Ling), Chinese empress (b. 321)
- Eusebius of Nicomedia, archbishop of Constantinople
- Ge Hong (or Ko Hung), Chinese taoist (approximate date)
- Paul of Thebes, Christian hermit (approximate date)
- Potamon of Heraclea, Christian bishop and martyr

342

- July 26 – Chen of Jin (or Sima Yan), Chinese emperor (b. 321)
- Barsabias, Christian abbot, missionary and martyr
- Paul of Thebes, Christian hermit (approximate date)
- Tiberius Julius Rhescuporis VI, Roman client king

343

- December 6 – Saint Nicholas (or Santa Claus) (b. 270)
- Li Shou (or Wukao), Chinese emperor of Cheng Han (b. 300)

344

- April 14
  - Chusdazat, Syrian Orthodox priest, martyr and saint
  - Pusai, Syrian Orthodox priest, martyr and saint
- August 20 – Heliodorus of Bet Zabdai, bishop and martyr
- November 17 – Jin Kangdi, emperor of the Jin Dynasty (b. 322)
- Biryu of Baekje, king of Baekje (Three Kingdoms of Korea)

345

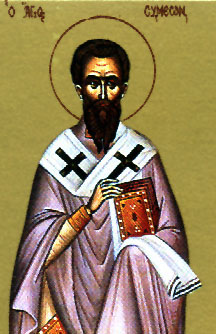
Saint Shemon Bar Sabbae

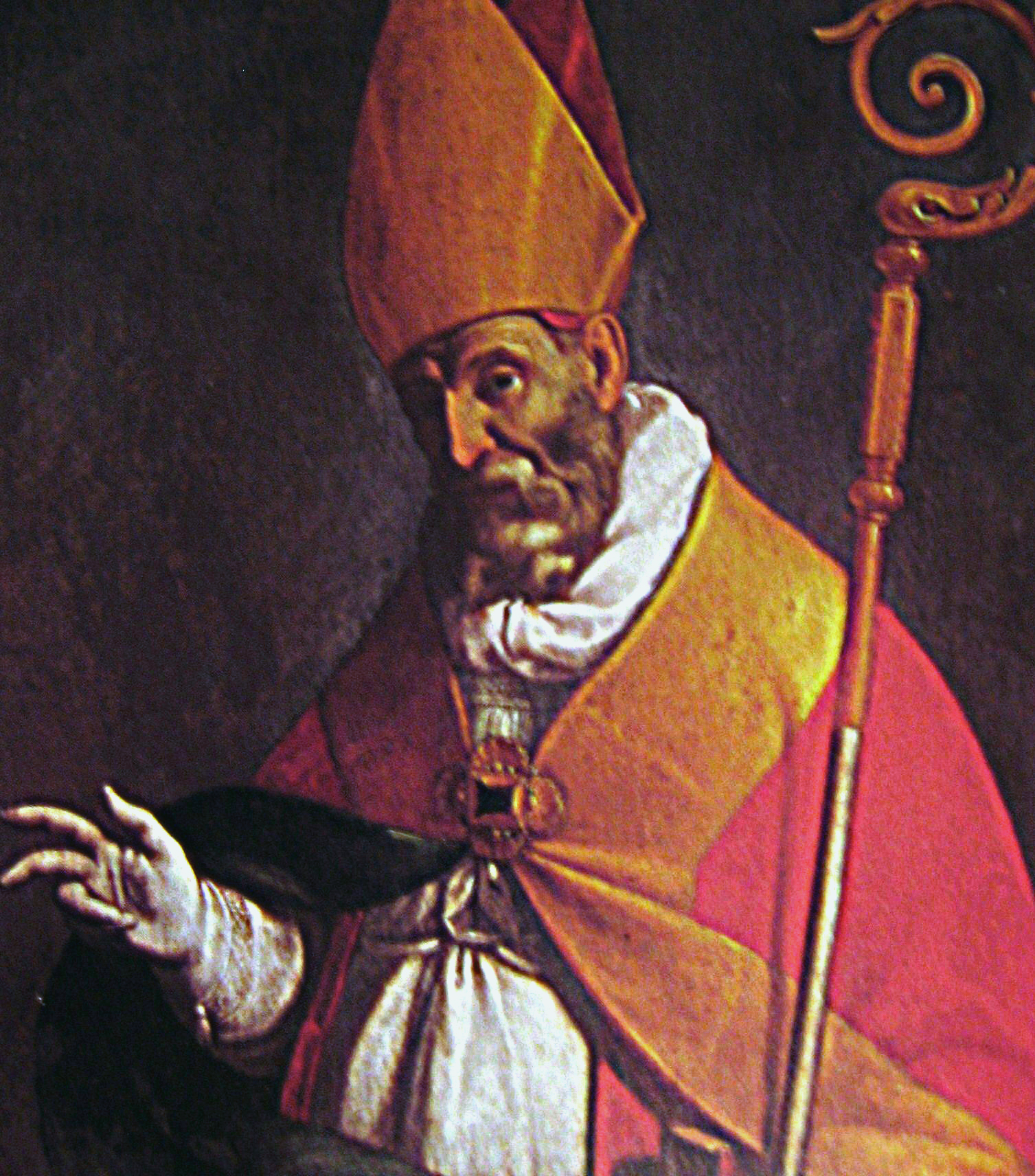
Saint Narnus

- February 4 – Abraham of Arbela, Persian bishop and martyr (approximate date)
- April 6
  - Abdecalas – Persian Orthodox priest and saint
  - Shemon Bar Sabbae – Persian Orthodox priest and saint
- June 16 – Patriarch Gregory of Cappadocia
- August 27 – Narnus, Roman Catholic bishop and saint
- November 20 – Abiatha, Hathes and Mamlacha, Syrian Orthodox priests, virgins, martyrs and saints
- Abdisho, member of the Church of the East
- Aphrahat, Syrian Orthodox priest and saint
- Stephen I of Antioch, Byzantine bishop and saint

346

- He Chong (or Cidao), Chinese politician (b. 292)
- Maximin of Trier, German bishop (approximate date)
- Zhang Jun (or Gongting), Chinese prince (b. 307)

347

- Ursicinus of Brescia, Bishop of Brescia

348

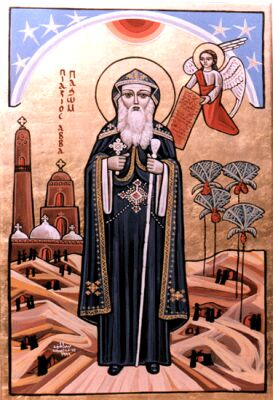
Saint Pachomius the Great

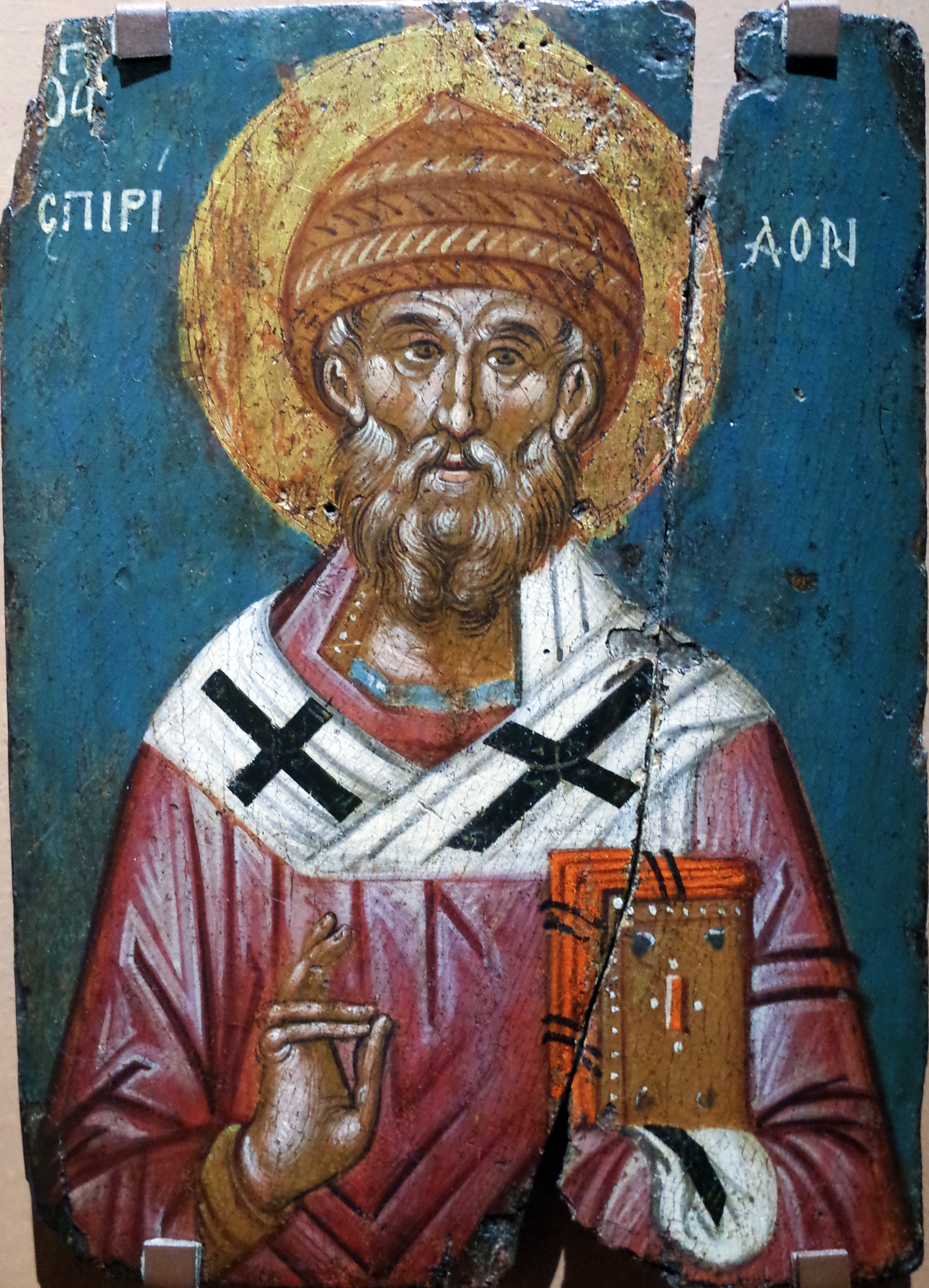
Saint Spyridon

- May 9 – Pachomius the Great, founder of Christian cenobitic monasticism (b. 292)
- December 12 – Saint Spyridon, Greek-Cypriot Orthodox bishop and saint (b. 270)
- Murong Huang, Chinese ruler of the Former Yan (b. 297)

349

- Empress Liu, wife of Emperor Shi Hu (b. 318)
- Shi Hu, emperor of the Jie state Later Zhao (b. 295)
- Shi Shi, emperor and brother of Shi Zun (b. 339)
- Shi Zun, emperor of the Jie state Later Zhao
- Wei Shuo, calligrapher of the Jin Dynasty (b. 272)
- Empress Zhang, wife of emperor Shi Zun
- Empress Zheng Yingtao, mother of emperor Shi Zun
