= Battle of Xiangguo (350–351) =

Conflict in northern China (350–351)

Date	November or December 350 – April or May 351 AD
Location	Xingtai, Hebei
Result	Zhao and Yan victory; Shi Zhi soon assassinated

Belligerents
Ran Wei	Later Zhao; Former Yan

Commanders and leaders
Ran Min	Shi Zhi; Shi Kun; Yao Xiang; Yue Wan

Strength
100,000+	130,000+

Casualties and losses
Heavy	Unknown

Battle of Xiangguo
- Traditional Chinese: 襄國之戰
- Simplified Chinese: 襄国之战
Transcriptions
Standard Mandarin
- Hanyu Pinyin: Xiāngguó zhī zhàn

The Battle of Xiangguo (simplified Chinese: 襄国之战; traditional Chinese: 襄國之戰; pinyin: Xiāngguó zhī zhàn) was fought between the state of Ran Wei and the allied forces of Later Zhao and Former Yan from roughly November 350 to May 351 AD during the Sixteen Kingdoms period of China. The battle concluded in victory for the alliance, but the Prince of Zhao, Shi Zhi, was soon assassinated, ending 32 years of Later Zhao rule in northern China.

== Background ==
In November or December 349, the adopted Later Zhao prince, Shi Min took control of the central government in Ye and installed a new emperor under his command. His paramountcy was plagued by multiple attempts on his life along with his infamous killing order on Jie and hu people, resulting in 200,000 deaths. The neighbouring Eastern Jin and Former Yan dynasties, observing the chaos unfolding, began preparations to seize Zhao territory, while generals such as the Di chieftain, Pu Hong saw an opportunity to breakaway.

In January or February 350, relying on the prophecy that "after Zhao comes Li", he changed the state's name to "Wey" (衞) and forced his family members to change their surnames into "Li" (李). The decision drew negative reactions; many generals and princes fled to old capital, Xiangguo, where they rallied around the Prince of Xinxing, Shi Zhi. Others like Pu Hong and Yao Yizhong refused to acknowledge his authority and held on to their territories. Soon, the Prince of Ruyin, Shi Kun led 70,000 men to attack Ye, but Ran Min and his ally, Li Nong drove him away.

After surviving a final attempt on his life, Shi Min had the emperor, Shi Jian and his family members in Ye massacred. Initially offering the throne to Li Nong, he declared himself Emperor of his new state of Wei and changed his name back to Ran Min. In response, Shi Zhi also proclaimed himself Emperor at Xiangguo.

== Prelude ==
=== Battle of Cangting ===
In April or May 350, Shi Zhi sent Shi Kun to attack Ran Min again. He joined forces with the local Zhao commander at Fanyang (繁陽; northeast of present-day Neihuang County, Henan), Liu Guo (劉國), but in June or July, they were badly defeated by the Wei general, Wang Tai (王泰).

In August or September, Liu Guo converged with Zhang Hedu, Duan Qin and Jin Tun (靳豚) at Changcheng (昌城; in present-day Changle County, Shandong), where they planned an assault on Ye. Ran Min marched out and won a great victory at Cangting (蒼亭; in present-day Yanggu, Shandong). The Zhao lost 28,000 soldiers, including Jin Tun, while the rest of the soldiers were captured and absorbed into the Wei army. After the battle, Ran Min's forces swelled to 300,000, an unprecedented number under Zhao rule.

== The battle ==
In November or December 350, Ran Min departed from Ye with 100,000 cavalry to attack Xiangguo. Shi Zhi was placed under siege for more than a hundred days, and in desperation, he demoted himself from Emperor to simply the Prince of Zhao. He then sent envoys; one to the Prince of Former Yan, Murong Jun, whose forces had invaded and seized a significant portion of Zhao territory to the north, while another to the Zhao vassal and Qiang chieftain at Shetou (灄頭; northeast of present-day Zaoqiang County, Hebei), Yao Yizhong, both asking them for reinforcements. In return for his help, Shi Zhi also offered Murong Jun the imperial seal.

Both Murong Jun and Yao Yizhong accepted his request. Yizhong entrusted his son, Yao Xiang with 28,000 cavalry units and contacted Murong Jun to coordinate their attack. Murong Jun in turn sent his General Who Resists Difficulties, Yue Wan with 30,000 soldiers to link up with Yao Xiang. In March or April 351, Yao Xiang marched towards Xiangguo, with Shi Kun joining him from Xindu. Ran Min ordered his subordinate, Hu Mu (胡睦) to fight Yao Xiang at Zhanglu (長蘆, in present-day Cangzhou, Hebei), while Sun Wei (孫威) fought Shi Kun at Huangqiu (黃丘, around present-day Shenzhou City, Hebei). However, the two generals were defeated and fled after suffering heavy losses.

Ran Min then considered fighting Yao Xiang and Shi Kun himself. Wang Tai opposed him, stating, "Xiangguo has not fallen, and now reinforcements are coming in droves. If you decide to fight them now, you will leave your rear open and attacked from two sides. This is a risky approach. It is best that we fortify our camps to soften the blow and carefully observe their movements for an opening. Moreover, Your Majesty is throwing yourself into battle; if anything were to happen to you, then all will be lost." Just as Ran Min was about to accept his suggestion, a Taoist official, Fa Rao (法饒), rebuked Wang Tai, stating, "Your Majesty has placed Xiangguo under siege since last year and we are no closer to success. Now these bandits have arrived, and you are choosing to avoid rather than attack. What would your soldiers think of this? Furthermore, Venus has entered the Mao Constellation, which means death for the barbarian king. Your battles will all be won, so do not waste this opportunity!" Hearing this rebuttal, Ran Min declared, "I have decided to go to battle. Anyone who opposes us will be killed!"

Just as Ran Min set out, Yue Wan's forces also arrived. When their forces met at Changlu Marsh (常盧澤), Yue Wan ordered his light cavalry to run around with bundles of wood behind their back, creating a massive dust cloud and giving the illusion that a large army was approaching. The Wei soldiers were frightened by the spectacle. Yao Xiang, Shi Kun and Yue Wan then attacked them from three sides, with Shi Zhi also marching out and attacking from the rear. During the battle, Ran Min's tribal soldiers arrested his son, the Grand Chanyu, Ran Yin (冉胤) and surrendered to Shi Zhi. Several of his key officials were also killed, while records state that "over a hundred thousand" Wei soldiers died in battle, incurring Wei a great defeat.

== Aftermath ==
=== Assassination of Shi Zhi ===
Ran Min escaped and personally snuck his way back into Ye. The city was shaken as rumours of Ran Min's death circulated, but their worries were quashed after he reappeared and held a sacrificial ceremony. Yao Xiang and Yue Wan returned home after the battle, while Shi Zhi had Ran Yin executed and sent his general, Liu Xian with 70,000 soldiers to press on to Ye. When Liu Xian arrived at Mingguang Palace (明光宮), several miles away from Ye, Ran Min panicked but soon marched out to give fight. He defeated Liu Xian and pursued him all the way to Yangping (陽平; in present-day Qingfeng County, Henan), killing more than 30,000 Zhao soldiers.

Frightened by his defeat, Liu Xian submitted to Ran Min and offered to prove himself by killing Shi Zhi. Ran Min believed him and sent him on his way. Only around a month after the siege was lifted, Shi Zhi and more than ten of his top officials were all assassinated by Liu Xian in Xiangguo, who then sent their heads to Ye. Ran Min burnt Shi Zhi's head in the main street of Ye, signalling the end of the Later Zhao dynasty.

=== War with Liu Xian and fall of Xiangguo ===
Ran Min rewarded Liu Xian by appointing him Supreme Grand General, Grand Chanyu and Inspector of Ji province. However, in July or August 351, Liu Xian rebelled by attacking Ye, and after he was repelled, he declared himself Emperor at Xiangguo. In January or February 352, Ran Min defeated Liu Xian at Changshan, and after chasing him back to Xiangguo, a traitor opened the gates for him to enter. He massacred Liu Xian and his court, burnt down the palaces and forcibly moved the city inhabitants to Ye.

Though Xiangguo was finally in Ran Min's hand, the war had taken a devastating toll on Wei. While Ran Min was preoccupied with Shi Zhi and Liu Xian, the Former Yan continued its expansion into the Central Plains, occupying as far as Zhongshan and Bohai commanderies. Soon after taking Xiangguo, Ran Min now had to deal with a Yan invasion, culminating in the decisive Battle of Liantai.

== Sources ==
- Li, Bo; Zheng Yin (Chinese) (2001) 5000 years of Chinese history, Inner Mongolian People's publishing corp, ISBN 7-204-04420-7,
- Book of Jin.
