= Yue Wan =

Former Yan general and minister

- 悅綰

City Chief of Kehu (榼盧城大)
- In office ?–?
- Monarch: Murong Huang

General Who Resists Difficulties (御難將軍)
- In office 339 – ?
- Monarch: Murong Huang/Murong Jun

General of the Front (前將軍)
- In office ?–?
- Monarch: Murong Jun

Right Supervisor of the Masters of Writing (尚書右僕射)
- In office ?–?
- Monarch: Murong Jun

Inspector of Bingzhou (并州刺史)
- In office 358 – ?
- Monarch: Murong Jun

Left Supervisor of the Masters of Writing (尚書左僕射)
- In office ?–?
- Monarch: Murong Wei

Personal details
- Born: Unknown
- Died: 368
- Peerage: Duke of Guangxin (廣信公)

Yue Wan (died 368) was a general and politician of Former Yan during the Sixteen Kingdoms period. He defended Fancheng (凡城, in modern Kazuo County, Liaoning) from Later Zhao in 339 and helped defeat Ran Min with Yao Xiang and Shi Zhi during the Yan-Wei War in 351. He was mostly known for his reforms in 368, in which he attempted to fix Yan's household registration system that was being abused by the nobility and corrupted officials. Following his conquest of Yan in 370, Former Qin's ruler, Fu Jian, lamented that he was unable to recruit Yue Wan while he was still alive.

== Life ==
=== Defence of Fancheng (339) ===
Yue Wan was of Xianbei ethnicity and began his career in Yan as the City Chief of Kehu (榼盧城; east of present-day Funing District, Hebei) before becoming a part of Murong Huang's personal staff as one of his marshals. In 339, the Later Zhao generals, Li Nong and Zhang Ju, invaded Yan's city of Fancheng with 30,000 men. Murong Huang appointed Yue Wan as General Who Resists Difficulties and sent him to defend the city with 1,000 soldiers.

When the Zhao soldiers arrived, the Yan officials within the city were shaken. They all considered abandoning the city, but Yue Wan told them, "I have been given orders to resist the enemy, and will do so whether I live or die. If we rely upon the city's defences, each one of us will be able to take on a hundred of them. Those who dare mislead the others will be executed!" The officials thus remained with Yue Wan. Yue personally lead the troops out to fight throughout the siege, going as far as exposing himself to enemy projectiles. Even after ten days of battle, Li Nong and Zhang Ju were still unable to take the city, so they retreated.

=== Yan-Wei War (350-352) ===
Murong Huang died in November 348 and was succeeded by his son, Murong Jun. The following year, Jun began preparations for war with Later Zhao with intentions of conquering the Central Plains after hearing the recent civil wars between the Zhao princes. He carried out his invasion in early 350, but as the war progressed, Yan's main threat quickly shifted away from Zhao to Zhao's break-away state, Ran Wei, and its ruler Ran Min. By early 351, Zhao's ruler, Shi Zhi, was at Murong Jun's mercy, and his head commander, Yao Yizhong, requested assistance from Yan to save Shi Zhi, who was besieged in Xiangguo by Ran Min. Yan accepted Yizhong's request, and sent Yue Wan with 30,000 soldiers to link up with his son, Yao Xiang.

Yao Xiang and the general Shi Kun (石琨) were the first to arrive at the outskirts of Xiangguo. Ran Min gathered his army and marched out to attack Yao Xiang head-on, but just as he did, Yue Wan, too would arrive to reinforce Xiang. As Yue approached the Wei army, Yue Wan ordered his cavalry to ride about with their horses dragging bundles of wood behind them. This created a huge cloud of dust, giving the impression to the Wei army that Yue Wan's army is bigger than it actually was. Yue Wan's tactic worked as the Wei army's morale fell. He, Yao Xiang and Shi Kun attacked Ran Min from three sides and was later joined by Shi Zhi, who marched out Xiangguo to attack Min from behind. Surrounded, Ran Min suffered a great defeat and barely escaped back to Yecheng with a few remaining riders.

Although Ran Min was driven back, Shi Zhi was assassinated by his subordinate Liu Xian (劉顯) shortly after, who then surrendered Xiangguo to Ran Min, ending Later Zhao. Because of this, Yue Wan returned to Murong Jun with his army. Previously, Zhao had sent Zhang Ju as an envoy to Yan, and Zhang had promised Murong Jun the imperial seal which he claimed was with Shi Zhi. However, seeing that Yue Wan returned empty-handed, Murong Jun realized Zhang Ju was lying, and had him executed.

=== Murong Jun's reign as Emperor (352-360) ===
Ran Wei was eventually conquered by Yan in 352, and later that year, Murong Jun would declare himself Emperor, signifying his independence from the Jin dynasty. Some time after, Yue Wan was appoint General of the Front. In 354, Yue Wan followed Murong Ke to Lukou (魯口; in present-day Raoyang County, Hebei) to subdue the self-proclaimed King of Anguo, Lü Hu. They captured Lukou, and Lü Hu fled to Yewang. Yue Wan pursued him, and eventually, Lü surrendered to Yan.

In 358, Murong Ping was sent to pacify Bingzhou, which was controlled by the semi-independent warlord, Zhang Ping. After more than a hundred fortified places surrendered to Yan, Yue Wan was appointed Inspector of Bingzhou to settle the people in the province.

=== State reforms and death (368) ===
Murong Jun died in 360 and was succeeded by his child heir, Murong Wei. He was assigned with four regents, Murong Ke, Murong Ping, Muyu Gen and Yang Wu. By the end of 367, only Murong Ping was remained, and Yan began to suffer from widespread corruption under his regency. One underlying problem faced by Yan at this time was the diminishing number of households under the state due to the corrupt practice by nobles and high officials of moving commoners under their personal fiefs. Public grain stores were being used up, and there was not enough taxes for the state to cover its public expenses.

Yue Wan had grown to the position of Left Supervisor of the Masters of Writing and was bestowed the title of Duke of Guangxin. Realizing this growing issue, in 368, Yue Wan said to Murong Wei, "The balance of power now lies in three states, with each side seeking to swallow the other. Yet, the administration of our state has not been upheld. The nobility is so arbitrary in their behaviour that they have caused the civil registry to be exhausted. The transport of goods to offices have ceased, the clerks are rarely given their salaries and the soldiers are cut from their food supply. The officials even have to borrow grain and silk to support themselves. Our enemies must know none of this, as this is not the way to govern. We ought to stop this herding of people in private fiefs and return them to their respective counties and commanderies."

Murong Wei agreed with his statement and ordered him to implement his reforms at once. Yue managed to uncover the ministers guilty of contributing to the problem and brought them to light. He also restored around 200,000 people to the public register from the fiefs. Though they greatly benefitted the state, Yue Wan became feared and despised by court officials who bore the brunt of his reforms. At the time of his reforms, however, Yue Wan was already ill, and while he was verifying the census registers, his condition began to worsen. He soon died in the winter of 368.

In 370, Former Qin invaded Yan and conquered the state. Qin's ruler, Fu Jian, heard of Yue Wan's services after his conquest and became regretful with the fact that he was unable to meet him. Because of this, he appointed Yue Wan's sons to serve as Household Gentlemen in his government.

=== Alternative account of death ===
Both the Spring and Autumn Annals of the Sixteen Kingdoms and Zizhi Tongjian states that his cause of death was illness. However, the Book of Jin provides a different account of his death. It was said that Murong Wei's regent, his uncle Murong Ping, resented Yue Wan as he, too was affected by his reforms. Because of this, he secretly sent an assassin to kill Yue Wan. Murong De's biography in the Book of Jin also implies that he was assassinated. In a passage said by Murong De's official, Han Zhuo (韓卓), in regard to rectifying the household register, it reads, "...if I then met with the punishment of Shang Yang or the fate of Yue Wan, I would utter no complaint."
