= Wang Wu (Sixteen Kingdoms) =

Wang Wu 王午

King of Anguo (安國王)
- Reign: 352–352
- Successor: Lü Hu

Inspector of Yongzhou (雍州刺史)
- In office 349 – 352
- Monarch: Shi Zun/Shi Jian/Shi Zhi/Ran Min

Personal details
- Born: Unknown
- Died: 352 Raoyang County, Hebei

Wang Wu (died 352) was a military general of the Later Zhao dynasty and the King of Anguo during the Sixteen Kingdoms period.

== Life ==
Wang Wu originally served as a general under the Later Zhao dynasty. Following the ascension of Shi Shi in 349, Wang Wu was one of the many generals who urged the Prince of Pengcheng, Shi Zun at Licheng to take the throne from his half-brother. After Shi Zun's usurpation, Wang Wu was appointed the Inspector of You province and was stationed at Ji.

As the Later Zhao continued to disintegrate, the Former Yan in the northeast seized the opportunity to march into the Central Plains in 350. Wang Wu guarded Ji with his fellow general, Deng Heng (鄧恒), but when the Yan army reached Wuzhong, he left his officer, Wang Tuo with several thousand soldiers to hold the city while he and Deng fell back to defend Lukou. Though they were able to enter Lukou, Ji fell to Yan forces after a brief fight, and Wang Tuo was executed.

Around this time, the Zhao Administrator of Fanyang, Li Chan, also surrendered to the Yan army, but his son, Li Ji (李績), decided to leave his family to join Wang Wu at Lukou. Deng urged Wang to get rid of Li, as he may have conflicting loyalty due to his family being in Yan, but Wang replied, "What nonsense is this? In these times of chaos, his actions demonstrate a noble spirit that led him to sacrifice his own family. The weight of his loyalty and integrity surpasses even that of the most heroes of old, and yet you wish to harm him based on suspicion? When the people of Yan and Zhao hear of this, they will think we gathered a band of thieves with no sense of a perception. Once the people are dispersed, they cannot be reunited; this is tantamount to self-destruction." Deng agreed and did not pursue the matter any further. However, Wang felt that his other generals were still ambivalent towards Li, and fearing that he will be pressured into executing him, Wang decided to send Li back to his home.

In 351, the Yan general, Murong Ping led his forces to march onto Lukou. When Murong Ping arrived at Nan'an, Wang Wu dispatched Zheng Sheng to repel him, but Ping defeated and killed him.

In 352, the Emperor of Ran Wei, Ran Min was captured by the Yan general, Murong Ke at the Battle of Liantai. His son, Ran Cao (冉操) fled to Lukou, where he was welcomed by Wang Wu. Not long after, the Yan army descended upon the Wei capital, Ye and conquered the city. With both the Zhao and Wei destroyed, as well as Deng Heng's death around this time, Wang Wu proclaimed himself the King of Anguo.

Soon, Yan forces under Murong Ke, Feng Yi and Yang Wu attacked Wang Wu. Wang shut the city gates and prepared to hold out, though after handing over Ran Cao, the Yan troops gathered the grains from the surrounding fields and temporarily withdrew. A few months later, Murong Ke camped at Anping, where he gathered more grains and built siege engines in preparation for his assault on Lukou, but once again withdrew due to an uprising led by Su Lin (蘇林) breaking out at Wuji.

Despite the delays of the Yan invasion, Wang Wu was assassinated by his general, Qin Xing (秦興). Qin was in turn killed by another general, Lü Hu, who then claimed Wang's title of King of Anguo.
