= 340 =

340 in various calendars
Gregorian calendar	340; CCCXL
Ab urbe condita	1093
Assyrian calendar	5090
Balinese saka calendar	261–262
Bengali calendar	−254 – −253
Berber calendar	1290
Buddhist calendar	884
Burmese calendar	−298
Byzantine calendar	5848–5849
Chinese calendar	己亥年 (Earth Pig); 3037 or 2830 — to — 庚子年 (Metal Rat); 3038 or 2831
Coptic calendar	56–57
Discordian calendar	1506
Ethiopian calendar	332–333
Hebrew calendar	4100–4101
- Hindu calendars
Vikram Samvat	396–397
Shaka Samvat	261–262
Kali Yuga	3440–3441
Holocene calendar	10340
Iranian calendar	282 BP – 281 BP
Islamic calendar	291 BH – 290 BH
Javanese calendar	221–222
Julian calendar	340; CCCXL
Korean calendar	2673
Minguo calendar	1572 before ROC 民前1572年
Nanakshahi calendar	−1128
Seleucid era	651/652 AG
Thai solar calendar	882–883
Tibetan calendar	阴土猪年 (female Earth-Pig); 466 or 85 or −687 — to — 阳金鼠年 (male Iron-Rat); 467 or 86 or −686

Year 340 (CCCXL) was a leap year starting on Tuesday of the Julian calendar. At the time, it was known as the Year of the Consulship of Acindynus and Valerius (or, less frequently, year 1093 Ab urbe condita). The denomination 340 for this year has been used since the early medieval period, when the Anno Domini calendar era became the prevalent method in Europe for naming years.

== Events ==
=== By place ===
==== Roman Empire ====
- Constantinople, capital of Emperor Constantius II, becomes the largest city in the world, taking the lead from Rome, capital of his brother Constans I.
- Constantine II, emperor of the western part of the Roman Empire (Britain, Gaul, the Rhine provinces and Iberia), crosses the Alps and attacks the army of his brother Constans I, emperor of the central part of the Roman Empire (Upper Danube, Italy and middle Africa). They clash at Aquileia in northern Italy. Constantine is killed in a skirmish by an ambush of Constans' troops.
- Constans is left sole ruler of the Western part of the Roman Empire, with his other brother, Constantius II, emperor of the Eastern portion.

=== By topic ===
==== Religion ====
- Acacius succeeds Eusebius as bishop in the see of Caesarea.
- Wulfila evangelizes among the Goths for 7 years.

== Births ==
- Aurelius Ambrose, bishop of Milan (approximate date)
- Amphilochius, bishop of Iconium (approximate date)
- Jerome, priest and Bible translator (approximate date)
- Justina, Roman empress and regent (approximate date)
- Peter of Sebaste, bishop of Armenia (approximate date)
- Quintus Aurelius Symmachus, Roman consul (d. 402)

== Deaths ==
- October 28 – Cunera (or Kunera), Christian martyr
- Constantine II, Roman consul and emperor (b. 316)
- Kui An, Indian general and minister of Later Zhao
- Macrina the Elder, Christian saint (approximate date)
- Tao Bao (or Anbu), Chinese general of Later Zhao
- Yu Liang (or Yuangui), Chinese general (b. 279)
