= Battle of Adrianople (324) =

Constantine I's victory over Licinius

Coordinates: 41°40′12″N 26°31′30″E

- Part of the civil wars of the Tetrarchy
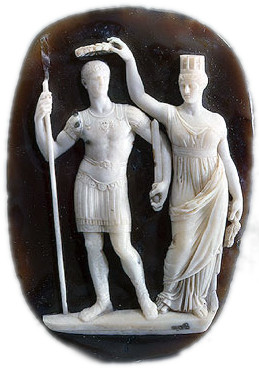
- Constantine I crowned as a victorious general – 4th century cameo
| Date | July 3, 324 AD |
| Location | Near Adrianople (modern Edirne, Turkey) |
| Result | Constantinian victory |

Belligerents
| Forces of Constantine (Western Empire) | Forces of Licinius (Eastern Empire) |

Commanders and leaders
| Constantine the Great | Licinius |

Strength
| 130,000 | 165,000 |

Casualties and losses
| Unknown | 34,000 killed |

The Battle of Adrianople was fought in Thrace on July 3, 324, during a Roman civil war, the second to be waged between the two emperors Constantine I and Licinius. Licinius was soundly defeated and his army suffered heavy casualties. Constantine built up military momentum, winning further battles on land and sea, eventually leading to the final defeat of Licinius at Chrysopolis.

== Background ==
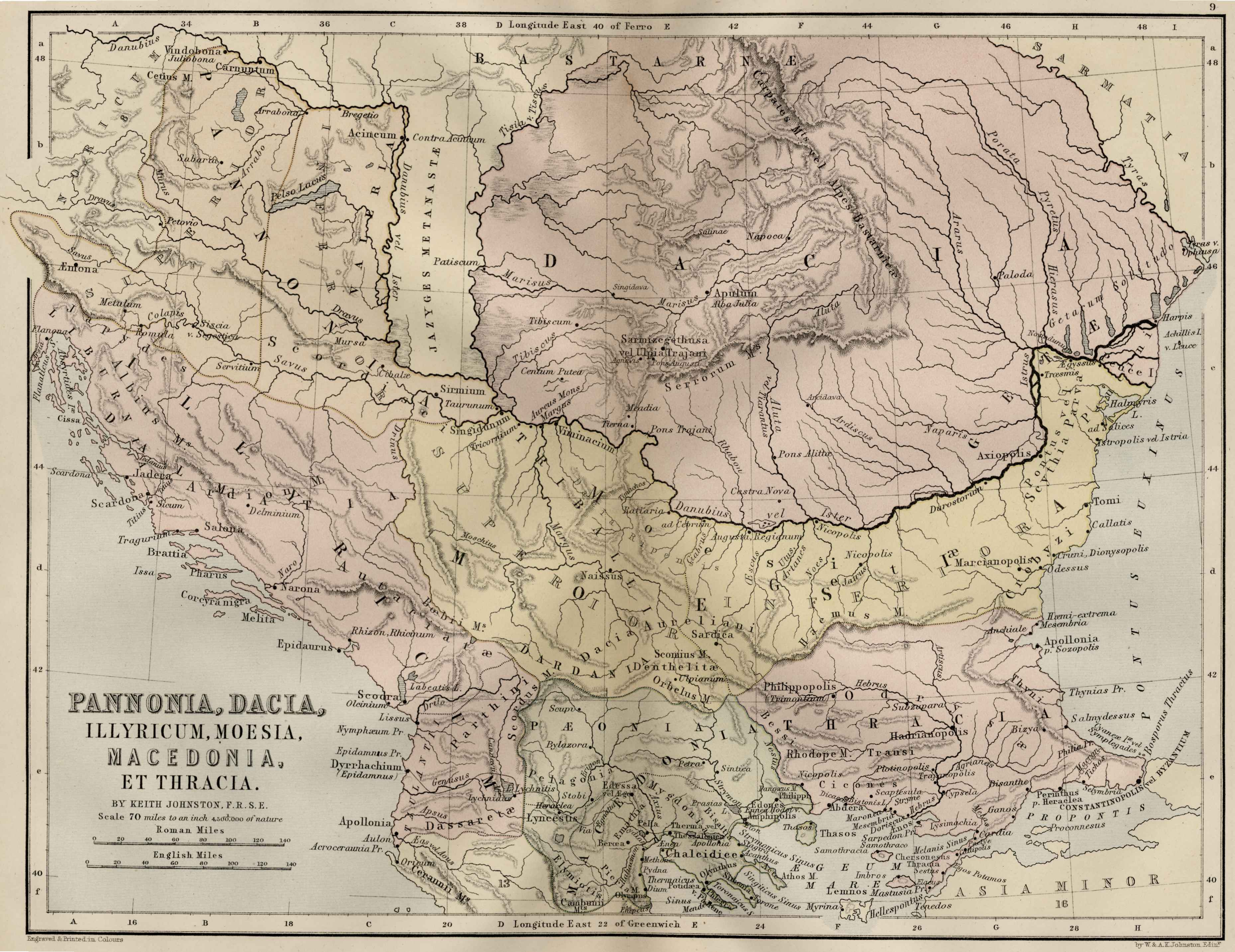
The Danubian Provinces of Rome. Adrianople (Hadrianoplis) and the Hebrus River are shown in the Province of Thrace

Constantine had, in a previous war (in 316), defeated Licinius at the Battle of Cibalae and conquered from him the entire Balkan Peninsula, with the exception of Thrace and Lower Moesia. A peace deal had been arranged, but the relationship between the two emperors remained uneasy. By 324 Constantine was ready to renew the conflict, and when his army, in pursuit of a raiding force of Visigoths, or possibly Sarmatians, crossed into Licinius' territory, an opportune casus belli was created. The reaction of Licinius to this incursion was overtly hostile, inducing Constantine to go on the offensive. Constantine invaded Thrace in force; his army was smaller than that of Licinius, but it contained many battle-hardened veterans and, as he had control of the Illyrian region, the finest-quality new recruits.

== Battle ==
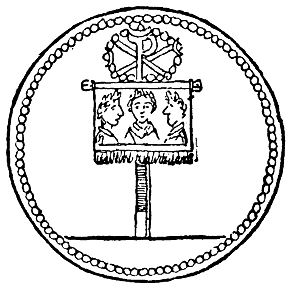
Constantine's labarum standard, from an antique silver medal

Licinius encamped his army in a strong position near Adrianople (Hadrianopolis), the major city of inland Thrace. Constantine advanced eastward from Thessalonica until he came to the Hebrus River, on which Adrianople stands, and set up his own camp. Licinius arranged his defensive line, of 200 stades in length, in a strong position between a height overlooking the town and the confluence of the Hebrus with a tributary. The two armies remained in position for a number of days before battle was finally joined, when Constantine took the initiative by crossing the river against a well-prepared and positioned enemy that had a superior number of soldiers.

Constantine used a ruse to get his troops across the Hebrus. Having noticed a suitable crossing point where the river narrowed and was overlooked by a wooded hillside, he ordered material and ropes to be conspicuously assembled at another place on the river, well away from his chosen crossing, to give the impression that he intended to build a bridge to cross there. On the wooded hillside, he secretly assembled 5,000 foot archers and a force of cavalry. He then led his cavalry over the river crossing at the narrows, and fell on the enemy unexpectedly. The surprise attack was a complete success, and the remainder of his army then crossed at the same point. With his position on the river outflanked, Licinius' withdrew his forces and took up a defensive position on higher ground. However, this gave Constantine the initiative once more, and his attack was again successful. What followed, in the words of historian Zosimus, was “a great massacre”. According to Zosimus, Licinius' army suffered losses of 34,000 dead, but this figure is considered an exaggeration by modern historians.

During the onslaught, Constantine directed the guard of his overtly Christian standard, the labarum, to move the standard to any part of the field where his troops seemed to be faltering. The appearance of this talisman emboldened his own troops and dismayed those of Licinius. Constantine, who had been slightly wounded in the thigh, halted his attack at sunset. Darkness allowed Licinius and the remains of his force to withdraw to Byzantium, the coast, and the safety of his fleet.

The battle was one of the largest of the 4th century. Zosimus describes Constantine personally leading the cavalry charge which broke Licinus' defences and attributes the success of the Constantinian forces to the courage and martial prowess of Constantine himself. Other contemporary accounts—however, ascribe success to the discipline of the troops and Constantine's felicitas, his 'good fortune'.

== Aftermath ==
Constantine's effort to start a civil conflict proved successful, as did his campaign against Licinius. Following the battle at Adrianople, Constantine moved to besiege Byzantium. At this point in the campaign, control of the narrow waters separating Thrace and Asia Minor became of the utmost importance to both emperors. Constantine's son Crispus commanded his navy in a struggle with the larger fleet of Licinius. Following Crispus' naval victory in the Battle of the Hellespont, Constantine crossed with his army into Bithynia. He met Licinius' army in the final battle of the war at Chrysopolis, on the Asiatic shore of the Bosporus. Constantine won an overwhelming victory.

Initially, yielding to the pleas of his sister, Constantine spared the life of his brother-in-law, but some months later he ordered his execution, thereby breaking his solemn oath. This occurred because Licinius was suspected of treasonable actions, and the army command pressed for his execution. A year later, Constantine's nephew, the younger Licinius II, also fell victim to the emperor's anger or suspicions. He was executed in 326 and his name was expunged from official inscriptions. Constantine became the first man to be master of the entire Roman world since the elevation of Maximian as co-emperor by Diocletian in 286.

== See also ==
- Siege of Byzantium (324)
- List of sieges of Constantinople
