= Potamon (disambiguation) =

Potamon is a genus of freshwater or semiterrestrial crabs. Potamon may also refer to:

- Potamon of Heraclea (died c. 341), a bishop of Heraclea in Egypt who was martyred
- Potamon of Mytilene (c. 65 BC–AD 25), a rhetorician in the Greek city of Mytilene
- Potamon (mythology), in Greek mythology an Egyptian prince, one of the sons of King Aegyptus
- Potamidae, a family of freshwater crabs
