= 316 =

316 in various calendars
- Gregorian calendar: 316; CCCXVI
- Ab urbe condita: 1069
- Assyrian calendar: 5066
- Balinese saka calendar: 237–238
- Bengali calendar: −278 – −277
- Berber calendar: 1266
- Buddhist calendar: 860
- Burmese calendar: −322
- Byzantine calendar: 5824–5825
- Chinese calendar: 乙亥年 (Wood Pig); 3013 or 2806 — to — 丙子年 (Fire Rat); 3014 or 2807
- Coptic calendar: 32–33
- Discordian calendar: 1482
- Ethiopian calendar: 308–309
- Hebrew calendar: 4076–4077
- Hindu calendars
- Vikram Samvat: 372–373
- Shaka Samvat: 237–238
- Kali Yuga: 3416–3417
- Holocene calendar: 10316
- Iranian calendar: 306 BP – 305 BP
- Islamic calendar: 315 BH – 314 BH
- Javanese calendar: 196–197
- Julian calendar: 316; CCCXVI
- Korean calendar: 2649
- Minguo calendar: 1596 before ROC 民前1596年
- Nanakshahi calendar: −1152
- Seleucid era: 627/628 AG
- Thai solar calendar: 858–859
- Tibetan calendar: ཤིང་མོ་ཕག་ལོ་ (female Wood-Boar); 442 or 61 or −711 — to — མེ་ཕོ་བྱི་བ་ལོ་ (male Fire-Rat); 443 or 62 or −710

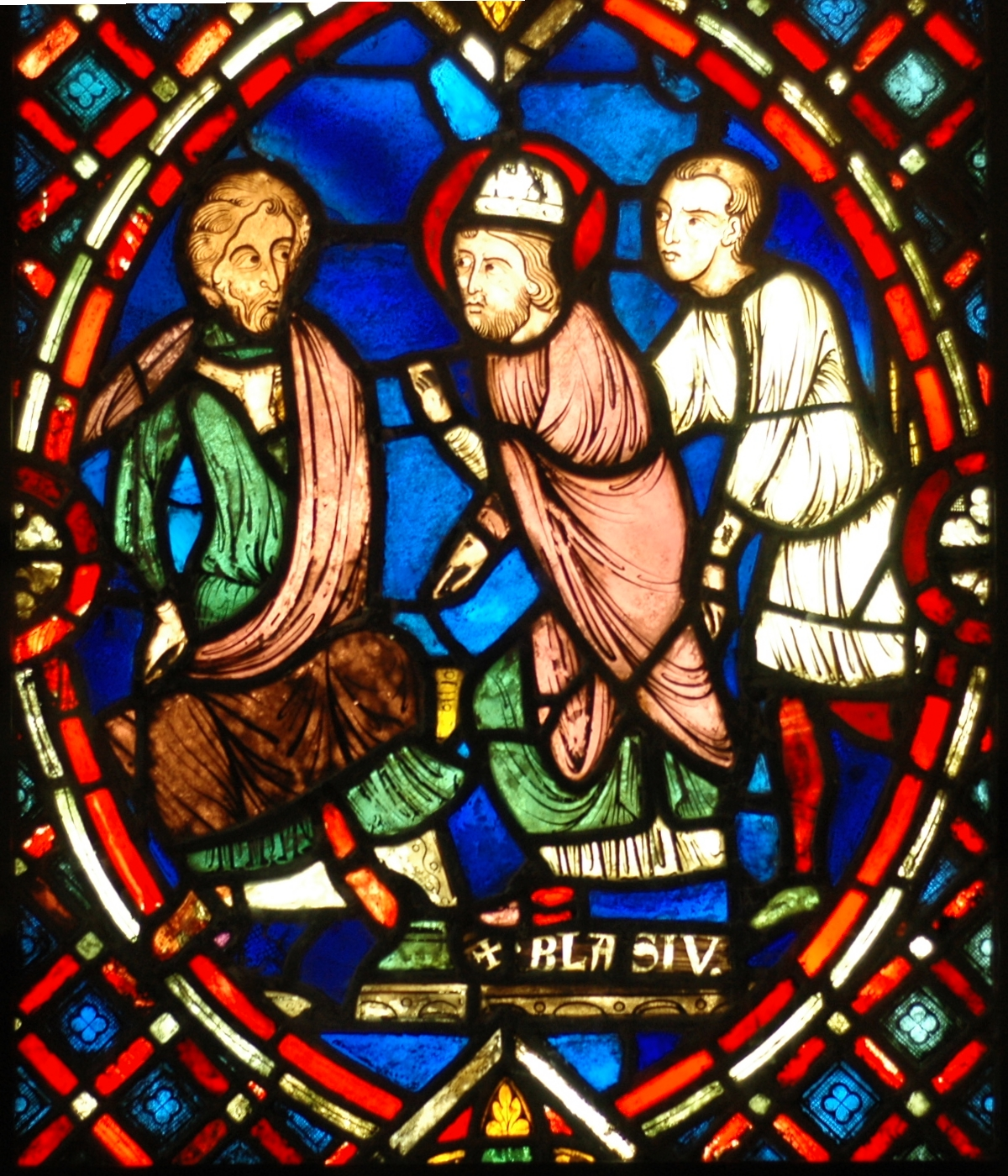
Blaise confronting the Roman governor, Soissons Cathedral (13th century)

Year 316 (CCCXVI) was a leap year starting on Sunday of the Julian calendar. At the time, it was known as the Year of the Consulship of Sabinus and Rufinus (or, less frequently, year 1069 Ab urbe condita). The denomination 316 for this year has been used since the early medieval period, when the Anno Domini calendar era became the prevalent method in Europe for naming years.

== Events ==
=== By place ===
==== Roman Empire ====
- Emperor Constantine the Great issues an edict, prohibiting the punishment of slaves by crucifixion and facial branding.
- Constantine I sends his half-brother Julius Constantius to Licinius at Sirmium (Pannonia), with the proposal to accept Bassianus as Caesar and give him power over Italy. Licinius refuses, and forces a conspiracy against Constantine.
- Licinius elevates Valerius Valens to Augustus, and mobilises an army against Constantine. Bassianus is accused of conspiracy and executed.
- October 8 – Battle of Cibalae: Constantine the Great defeats his rival Licinius near the town of Colonia Aurelia Cibalae (modern-day Vinkovci, Croatia). Licinius is forced to flee to Sirmium and loses all of the Balkans except for Thrace. Peace negotiations are initiated between the two Augusti, but they are unsuccessful.
- December – Battle of Mardia: Constantine I defeats his rival Licinius and senior officer Valerius Valens, near the town of Harmanli (Bulgaria).

==== Asia ====
- Han-Zhao forces capture Chang'an, capital of the Chinese Western Jin dynasty. Emperor Min of Jin surrenders to Liu Yao, ending the Western Jin.

=== By topic ===
==== Religion ====
- At the request of the Christians, Constantine I attempts to end the schism with the Donatist sect.

== Births ==
- Constantine II, Roman emperor (d. 340)
- Martin of Tours, bishop of Tours (d. 397)

== Deaths ==
- Diocletian, Roman emperor, commits suicide (b. 244) (most historians date his death to 311 or 312)
- Blaise, bishop of Sebastea (martyred)
- Bassianus, Roman advisor and politician
- Suo Chen (or Juxiu), Chinese general
- Tuoba Pugen, Chinese chieftain of the Tuoba clan
- Tuoba Yilu, Chinese chieftain of the Tuoba clan
