= Lesbonax =

Author of sixteen political speeches

Lesbonax of Mytilene (Ancient Greek: Λεσβώναξ ὁ Μυτιληναῖος), a Greek sophist and rhetorician, flourished in the time of Roman emperor Augustus. According to Photius I of Constantinople he was the author of sixteen political speeches, of which two are extant, a hortatory speech after the style of Thucydides, and a speech on the Corinthian War. In the first he exhorts the Athenians against the Spartans, in the second (the title of which is misleading) against the Thebans (edition by F. Kiehr, Lesbonactis sophistae quae supersunt, Leipzig 1906). Some erotic letters are also attributed to him. His son Potamo was also a notable rhetorician.

The Lesbonax described in the Suda as the author of a large number of philosophical works is probably of much earlier date; on the other hand, the author of a small treatise on grammatical figures (ed. Rudolf Müller, Leipzig, 1900), is probably later.
