= Lü Hu =

Lü Hu 呂護

King of Anguo (安國王)
- Reign: 352–354
- Predecessor: Wang Wu

Inspector of Guangzhou (廣州刺史)
- In office 361 – 362
- Monarch: Murong Jun

Personal details
- Born: Unknown
- Died: 362 Luoyang, Henan

Lü Hu (died 362) was a warlord and briefly the King of Anguo during the Jin dynasty (266–420) and Sixteen Kingdoms period. He served under the Later Zhao, Ran Wei, Eastern Jin and Former Yan.

== Life ==
Lü Hu was initially a general of the Later Zhao dynasty. After Ran Min massacred the Zhao imperial clan at Ye and founded his state of Ran Wei in 350, he appointed Lü Hu as his General Who Attacks Barbarians. The following year, he and a fellow general, Gao Chong (高崇) arrested the Inspector of Luo province, Zheng Xi and surrendered the Sanhe region (Henan, Henei and Hedong) to the Eastern Jin dynasty in the south. However, he soon decided not to join the Jin and instead sought refuge with another Zhao general, Wang Wu at Lukou.

Following Ran Min's capture and execution to the Former Yan in 352, Wang Wu proclaimed himself as King and established the short-lived state of Anguo. Not long after, he was attacked by Former Yan forces, and while holding out at Lukou, he was assassinated by his subordinate, Qin Xing. Lü Hu immediately killed Qin Xing, and assumed control over Lukou by claiming Wang's title of King of Anguo.

In 354, the Yan general, Murong Ke marched onto Lukou and besieged the city. Lü Hu attempted to hold out, but his city fell in just over a month. He abandoned Lukou and tried to flee, but his army was destroyed by another general, Yue Wan in a pursuit. Most of his subordinates were captured, but Lü was able to escape to Yewang. There, he sent out his younger brother Lü Feng (呂奉) to apologize to the Yan for his actions. The Emperor of Yan, Murong Jun, forgave him and appointed him as the Administrator of Henei, recognizing Lü's rule over Yewang.

However, Lü's vassalage was merely nominal. He secretly communicated with the Eastern Jin court to plot against the Yan, while Murong Jun also harboured intentions to eliminate him. In 358, the Administrator of Shangdang, Feng Yang was defeated by the Yan general, Murong Ping. Feng fled to Yewang, where he was welcomed by Lü Hu.

In 361, the warlord Gao Chang (高昌) died at Xingyang while fleeing from Yan forces. Lü Hu absorbed his followers before sending an envoy to the Eastern Jin to formally offer his submission. The Jin court appointed him as the General of the Front and the Inspector of Ji province. Lü planned to welcome the Jin army into his territory and join forces to launch a surprise attack on the Yan capital, Ye.

Not long after, Lü Hu's plan was discovered by the Yan, and so Murong Ke, along with Huangfu Zhen and Fu Yan, led 50,000 troops to subdue him. When they arrived at Yewang, Lü and his soldiers mounted a firm defense, while Murong Ke prepared for a long campaign as his men besieged the city.

After months of siege, Lü Hu gave 7,000 elite troops to his subordinate, Zhang Xing to sally out for an attack. However, they were repelled by Fu Yan and Zhang Xing was killed in battle. With his food supplies running low, Lü Hu carried out a night attack on Huangfu Zhen's camp, but Huangfu had anticipated him and strengthened the camp's defense, preventing a breakthrough. Murong Ke capitalized on the situation to attack, killing and wounding most of Lü Hu's officers and soldiers. Lü was forced to abandon his wife and children and fled to Xingyang, allowing Yewang to fall. His Army Advisor, Liang Chen surrendered to Yan and was promoted to Gentleman-Author of the Palace Secretariat.

Later in the year, Lü Hu again apologized to Former Yan and offered his surrender. The Emperor of Yan, Murong Wei pardoned him and appointed him the Inspector of Guang province and General Who Calms the South.

In 362, Lü Hu was ordered to capture Luoyang from the Eastern Jin, marching to Heyin with Fu Yan. A month later, Fu Yan was ordered to turn back to campaign against the Tiele in the north while Lü Hu continued his advance along, capturing several small fortresses along the way. Lü's arrival sparked great fear among the defender of Luoyang. The Administrator of Henan, Dai Shi fled to Wan, while the Champion General, Chen You requested for emergency reinforcements.

The Grand Marshal of Jin, Huan Wen sent Yu Xi and Deng Xia with a naval force of 3,000 soldiers to relieve Luoyang. When they arrived, Lü Hu retreated to Xiaopingjin, but he was killed in action by a stray arrow.
