= Zhi Xiong =

Later Zhao general

- 支雄

Libationer of the Gates (門臣祭酒)
- In office 319 – ?
- Monarch: Shi Le

Personal details
- Born: Unknown
- Died: Unknown

Zhi Xiong (fl.305 - 338) was a Yuezhi military general of Later Zhao during the Sixteen Kingdoms period. He was one of Shi Le's Eighteen Riders (十八騎) whose career stretched from Shi Le's bandit days all the way to the reign of his nephew Shi Hu.

== Life ==
Zhi Xiong was a descendant of one of the Yuezhi tribes in Central Asia. He joined Shi Le in 305, after the latter had just established himself as a bandit with support from Ji Sang. Like many who joined him, he became one of Shi Le's Eighteen Riders. In 309, after Shi Le occupied Julu and Changshan commanderies, Zhi Xiong was made one of his "talon and teeth" (爪牙) along with Kong Chang, Kui An, Tao Bao and Lu Ming (逯明).

Zhi Xiong followed Shi Le to attack Jiankang in 312. The campaign was going badly for Shi Le as storms, famines and diseases was deteriorating his numbers. He gathered his generals to discuss their next move. Zhi Xiong and Kong Chang suggested to Shi Le that they carry out a night raid on Shouchun and break through Danyang. Shi Le applaud their bold idea but did not think it had proper strategy to it. In the end, he followed Zhang Bin and subverted his plans from conquering Jiankang to conquering Yecheng.

Along the way, he came across the Administrator of Ji, Xiang Bing (向冰) at Fangtou (枋頭, in modern Hebi, Henan). Prior to that, Shi Le's army was already suffering from famine to the point of resorting to cannibalism, and Shi Le worried that Xiang Bing may finish them off. With advice of Zhang Bin, Shi Le sent Zhi Xiong and Kong Chang to Wenshi Crossing (文石津, around present-day Yanjin County, Henan), where they were tasked in capturing boats from Shi Le's army to cross. They brought back the boats, allowing Shi Le to properly battle Xiang Bing and capturing him.

In 312, Zhi Xiong was one of the many generals to besiege Xuanyang (苑鄕, in present-day Hebei and Beijing) after the inhabitants renounce their allegiance to Han-Zhao and surrendered the Youzhou's warlord Wang Jun. Wang Jun assisted the rebels by attacking Shi Le's base at Xiangyang, but was repelled, so people of Xuanyang surrendered back to Zhao.

In 315, Zhi Xiong was sent to defeat Liu Kun's general Liu Yan at Linqiu but lost. Liu Yan ordered his generals Pan Liang (潘良) and Han Hong (韓弘) to attack Dunqiu (頓丘, in present-day Qingfeng County, Henan), where they beheaded the prefect Shao Pan (邵攀). Zhi Xiong counterattacked and chase them back to Linqiu, where he killed Pan Liang. Later that year, Zhi Xiong and Lu Ming attacked Ning Hei (甯黑) at Wuyang. Ning Hei drowned himself, and Zhi Xiong relocated the people of Wuyang to Xiangguo.

Shi Le broke away from Han-Zhao and established his own independent regime in 319. Zhi Xiong was made Libationer of the Gates. His duty was to prevent and settle any conflict among the tribal people and ensure that they do not oppress the Han Chinese officials within Shi Le's territory.

In 338, Zhi Xiong participated in the Later Zhao and Former Yan joint campaign against the Duan tribe. Zhi Xiong was made Grand Dragon-Soaring General and together with Yao Yizhong, they were given 70,000 cavalry under their command to serve as the vanguard against the tribe's chieftain, Duan Liao. During the campaign, Zhi Xiong made a long march to Jicheng, forcing the administrators of Yuyang, Shanggu and Dai to surrender while capturing forty cities. The campaign ended in the alliance's victory and the end of the Duan tribe's autonomy. Nothing is recorded of Zhi Xiong from this point on.
