= Potamo of Mytilene =

Greek rhetorician and writer (c. 655 BC–c. 25)

Potamo or Potamon (Greek: Ποτάμων ὁ Μυτιληναῖος; around 65 BC–around AD 25)) of Mytilene in Lesbos, son of Lesbonax the rhetorician, was himself a rhetorician in the time of the Roman emperor Tiberius, whose favour he enjoyed. He is mentioned by Plutarch as an authority regarding Alexander the Great. It is probably he whom Lucian states to have attained the age of ninety.

When his son was killed, according to Seneca the Elder, he delivered a speech on the suasoria relating to the Spartans deliberating whether to flee Thermopylae wherein he exhorted the Spartans against flight, in contrast to his rival Lesbocles, who shut down his school of rhetoric after the death of his son. His city sent him on embassies to Rome in 45 and 25 BC.

== Works ==
The Suda informs us that, in addition to his work On Alexander of Macedon (Περὶ Ἀλεξάνδρου τοῦ Μακεδόνος), he wrote several other works, namely:

- Annals of the Samians (Ὅρους Σαμίων)
- Encomium of Brutus (Βρούτου ἐγκώμιον)
- Encomium of Caesar (Καίσαρος ἐγκώμιον)
- On the Perfect Orator (Περὶ τελείου ῥήτορος)

To these should perhaps be added On the Different, quoted by Ammonius Grammaticus.
