= Bassianus (executed by Constantine) =

Bassianus (died 316 AD) was a Roman senator, whom the Emperor Constantine I arranged to marry his half-sister, Anastasia. In 314 Constantine hoped to elevate Bassianus to the imperial rank of caesar, but Constantine's co-augustus in the East Licinius successfully opposed the move. According to the Anonymus Valesianus, a Latin chronicle composed during late antiquity, Bassianus was accused of plotting against the throne and was executed by Constantine.

== Biography ==
The choice of Bassianus is probably to be understood in light of the fact that Bassianus' brother, Senecio, was a high official in service of Licinius, Constantine's colleague in the East, and thus this marriage strengthened the bond between the two augusti.

The next year, in 316, Constantine sent his half-brother Julius Constantius, to Licinius at Sirmium, with the proposal of elevating Bassianus to the rank of caesar and with power over Italy. Licinius refused to acknowledge the appointment; furthermore, he told Senecio to contact his brother and have him kill Constantine, take arms and conquer Italy for Licinius. The conspiracy was discovered and Bassianus arrested and put to death. Constantine asked Licinius to hand him Senecio, but Licinius refused and overthrew his colleague's statues at Emona, on the border between the two spheres of influence; these events led to the outbreak of hostilities between Constantine and Licinius, an episode of civil war known as the bellum Cibalense.

Recent prosopographical studies suggest that Bassianus and Senecio were members of the families of Anicii and of Nummii Albini Seneciones.

== Bibliography ==
=== Primary sources ===
- Origo Constantini, 5,14–15.
- Eusebius of Caesarea, Vita Constantini, 1.47.1
- Zosimus, Historia nea, II.18–20.

=== Secondary sources ===
- Charles Matson Odahl (2004). Constantine and the Christian empire Routledge, p. 144. ISBN 0-415-17485-6
- Martindale, John R.; Jones, A. H. M.; Morris, John, eds. (1971). "Bassianus 1". The Prosopography of the Later Roman Empire: Volume I, AD 260–395. Cambridge: Cambridge University Press. p. 150. ISBN 0-521-07233-6.
