= List of sieges of Constantinople =

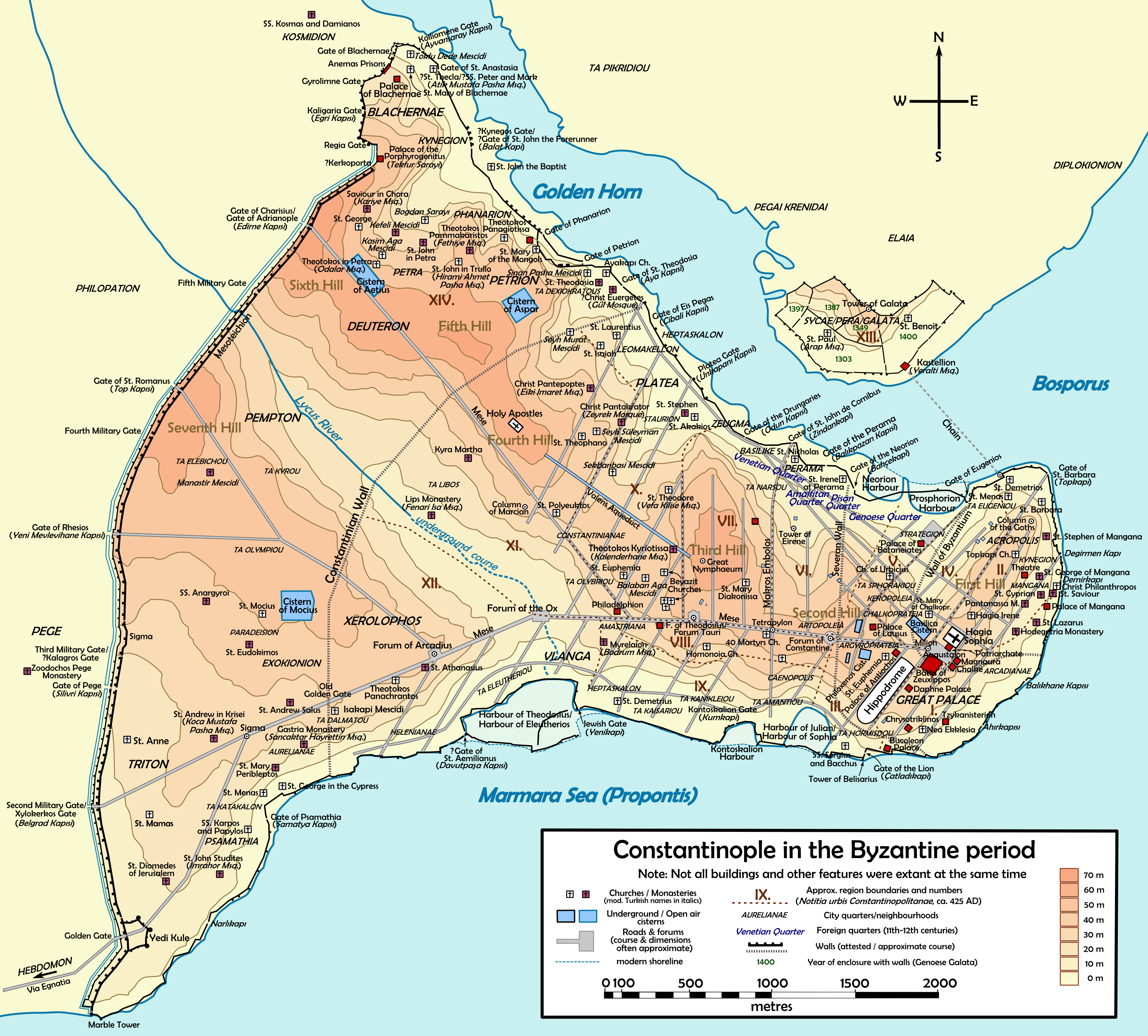
Topographical map of Constantinople during the Byzantine period, corresponding to the modern-day Fatih district of Istanbul. The city was known as Byzantium under Roman Empire.

Constantinople (part of modern Istanbul, Turkey) was built on the land that links Europe to Asia through the Bosporus and connects the Sea of Marmara and the Black Sea. As a transcontinental city within the Silk Road, Constantinople had a strategic value for many empires and kingdoms who tried to conquer it throughout history.

Known as Byzantium in classical antiquity, the first recorded siege of the city occurred in 510 BC by the Achaemenid Empire under the command of Otanes. Following this successful siege, the city fell under the rule of Persians until it won its independence again, and around 70 BC it became part of the Roman Republic, which was succeeded by the Roman Empire. Despite being part of Rome, it was a free city until it came under siege by Septimius Severus between 193–196 and was partially sacked during the civil war. After it was captured by Constantine the Great in 324, it became the capital of the Roman Empire, under the name of New Rome. It later became known as Constantinople, and in the years that followed it came under attack by both Byzantine pretenders fighting for the throne and also by foreign powers for a total of 22 times. The city remained under Byzantine rule until the Ottoman Empire took over as a result of the siege in 1453, known as the Fall of Constantinople, after which no other sieges took place.

Constantinople was besieged 36 times throughout its history. Out of the ten sieges that occurred during its time as a city-state and later while it was under Roman rule, six were successful, three were repelled and one was lifted as a result of the agreement between the parties. Three of these sieges were carried out by the Romans who claimed the throne during civil war. Of all the sieges that took place from its founding by Constantine the Great till 1453, only three were successful, 21 were unsuccessful, and three were lifted by reaching mutual agreements. Four of these sieges took place during civil wars. The Sack of Constantinople that took place in 1204 during the Fourth Crusade caused the city to fall and to be established as the capital of the Latin Empire. It also sent the Byzantine imperial dynasty to exile, who founded the Empire of Nicaea. Constantinople came under Byzantine rule again in 1261 who ruled for nearly two centuries. The city was taken by the Ottomans with the siege in 1453, and as a result the Byzantine Empire came to an end. The city has been under the rule of Turks since the last siege, apart from the several raids done by the Zaporozhian Cossacks in 1613, 1615, 1616, 1617, 1620, 1623, 1624, 1625, 1629 and 1652; and for the period of Allied occupation from 1920 to 1923.

== List ==
Date	Attackers	Defenders	Forces used	Result (Note: The "Result" column is relative to the side that carries out the siege.)	Ref.
510 BC	Achaemenid Empire	Byzantium	Naval and land	Successful	
478 BC	Delian League	Achaemenid Empire	Naval	Successful	
408 BC	Athens	Byzantium, Megara, Boeotia	Naval and land	Successful	
340–339 BC	Macedonia	Byzantium, Athens	Naval and land	Unsuccessful	
278–277 BC	Galatians	Byzantium	Land	Lifted (Note: As a result of the agreement reached with the mediator of Bithynia, the siege was lifted.)	
251 BC	Seleucid Empire	Byzantium, Heraclea Pontica, Ptolemaic Kingdom	Naval and land	Unsuccessful	
73–72 BC	Pontus	Byzantium	Naval and land	Unsuccessful (Note: While some sources have used Cicero and Tacitus's writings as a reference to argue that the city was in fact under a siege until it "repelled the enemies", other ancient writings found mention that a siege was planned through the sea but did not take place because of stormy weather conditions.)	
193–194	Septimius Severus	Pescennius Niger	Naval and land	Successful	
313	Maximinus II	Licinius	Land	Successful	
324	Constantine the Great	Licinius	Naval and land	Successful	
378	Goths	Roman Empire	Land	Unsuccessful	
626	Pannonian Avars, Sasanian Empire	Byzantine Empire	Naval and land	Unsuccessful	
654	Rashidun Caliphate	Byzantine Empire	Naval and land	Unsuccessful	
669	Umayyad Empire	Byzantine Empire	Naval and land	Unsuccessful	
674–678	Umayyad Empire	Byzantine Empire	Naval and land	Unsuccessful	
715	Byzantine Empire, Theodosius III	Byzantine Empire, Anastasios II	Naval and land	Successful	
717–718	Umayyad Empire	Byzantine Empire	Naval and land	Unsuccessful	
813	First Bulgarian Empire	Byzantine Empire	Land	Unsuccessful	
821–822	Thomas the Slav	Michael II	Naval and land	Unsuccessful	
860 (Note: Byzantine sources give 860 and Russian sources give 866 as the year in which this siege occurred, although it is accepted that the latter is wrong.)	Rus' Khaganate	Byzantine Empire	Naval and land	Unsuccessful	
907	Kievan Rus'	Byzantine Empire	Naval and land	Unsuccessful	
913	First Bulgarian Empire	Byzantine Empire	Land	Unsuccessful	
921	First Bulgarian Empire	Byzantine Empire	Land	Unsuccessful	
923	First Bulgarian Empire	Byzantine Empire	Land	Unsuccessful	
941	Kievan Rus'	Byzantine Empire	Naval and land	Unsuccessful	
1047	Leo Tornikios	Constantine IX Monomachos	Land	Unsuccessful	
1203	Crusaders	Byzantine Empire	Naval and land	Lifted	
1204	Crusaders	Byzantine Empire	Naval and land	Successful	
1235–1236	Empire of Nicaea, Second Bulgarian Empire	Latin Empire, Duchy of the Archipelago	Naval and land	Unsuccessful	
1241	Empire of Nicaea	Latin Empire, Republic of Venice	Naval	Unsuccessful	
1260–1261	Empire of Nicaea	Latin Empire	Naval and land	Successful	
1376	Genoa, Andronikos IV Palaiologos	John V Palaiologos	Land	Successful	
1391	Ottoman Empire	Byzantine Empire	Naval and land	Unsuccessful (Note: The besieging army retreated after Byzantine allies, the Hungarians attacked the Ottoman lands.)	
1394–1402 (Note: The year in which the siege started is controversial. Fahameddin Başar, Halil İnalcık and Konstantin Josef Jireček gave it as 1394, while Feridun Emecen and Haldun Eroğlu believed that it was 1396. In addition, some sources mention that the siege started in 1391 and ended in 1396, and that between these years, there was only one siege, the severity of which increased and decreased from time to time.)	Ottoman Empire	Byzantine Empire	Naval and land	Unsuccessful (Note: The siege was lifted after Timur attacked the Ottoman lands.)	
1411	Musa Çelebi	Byzantine Empire	Land	Unsuccessful (Note: The siege was lifted after Mehmed Çelebi's move to Rumeli territory to fight against Musa Çelebi.)	
1422	Ottoman Empire	Byzantine Empire	Land	Unsuccessful (Note: The siege was lifted after Mustafa Çelebi's move to Anatolian lands to fight against Murad II.)	
1453	Ottoman Empire	Byzantine Empire	Naval and land	Successful	
