= Chusdazat =

4th-century Christian priest and martyr

Chusdazat (also known as Gothazat, Guhashtazad, and Usthazan) (? – Good Friday, 344) is the name of a priest and fellow martyr of Bishop Simeon Barsabae. He was a eunuch of King Shapur II (Savori, or Sapor).

His feast is celebrated on April 14 in the Syrian Church, April 17 in the Greek Orthodox Church, April 21 in the Roman Catholic Church, April 30 in the Melkite Catholic Church, and the Friday after Easter in the Syriac Orthodox Church and the Assyrian Church of the East.

Persecuting Christians in 341 CE, Shapur tortured Simeon and the priests Audel and Ananias. Seeing this, Chusdazat also declared his Christian belief. He was executed before Simeon and a thousand other Christians.

The following year on Great Friday, the king executed another thousand Christians, but then he ceased executions because he regretted the loss of one of his favorite eunuchs, Azat.

== Sources ==
- Holweck, F. G. A Biographical Dictionary of the Saints. St. Louis, MO: B. Herder Book Co., 1924.
