= Barsabias =

Abbot and missionary who was martyred in Persia

Saint Barsabias
- Died: 342; Astahara, near the ruins of Persepolis, Persia
- Feast: 20 October

Saint Barsabias (d. 342) was an abbot and missionary who was martyred in Persia. His feast day is 20 October.

== Monks of Ramsgate's account ==
The monks of St Augustine's Abbey, Ramsgate, in their Book of Saints (1921) wrote,

BARSABIAS and OTHERS (SS.) MM. (Oct. 20)
(4th century) A Persian Abbot and his eleven monks put to death as Christians by the persecuting King, Sapor II, near the ruins of Persepolis (A.D. 342).

== Butler's account ==
The hagiographer Alban Butler wrote,

[Oct. 20]
St. Barsabias, Abbot, and His Companions, Martyrs, in Persia. Eugenius, called by the Orientals Abus, by the Chaldæans Avus, that is, Our Father, and corruptly by Sozomen, Aones, was a disciple of the great St. Antony. Travelling into the East, he founded and governed a numerous monastery near Nisibus, from whence he sent out colonies over all Persia, in which country there were many monasteries in the fourth century, as appears from Theodoret, Barebræus, and other Syrian writers. Sozomen tells us, that these monks, the disciples of Abus, completed the conversion of all Syria, and by their preaching brought to the right faith many among the Persians and Saracens. Barsabias was one of these zealous disciples of Abus, and was abbot in Persia, having under him ten monks, whom he educated with great attention and care in the paths of Christian perfection. His distinguished zeal made the persecutors mark him out one of the first for the slaughter.

He was apprehended in the beginning of the great persecution of Sapor, and impeached before the governor of the province upon an indictment that he laboured to abolish in Persia the religion of the Magians. With him his ten monks were led in chains to Astahara, a city near the ruins of Persepolis, where the governor of the province resided. This inhuman judge racked his brain to invent the most cruel kind of torments to inflict upon them. By his order their knees were bruised and shattered, their legs were broken; then their arms, sides, and ears were cut and torn in the most barbarous manner, their eyes were beaten, and their faces were swollen and inflamed with the buffets they had received. At length, the governor, enraged to see himself vanquished by their invincible virtue, and tired with tormenting them, condemned them to lose their heads. The martyrs walked joyfully to the place of execution, singing the praises of God in hymns and psalms, being surrounded by a great troop of soldiers and executioners, and followed by an incredible number of people. The good abbot desired earnestly to send before him to bliss, all those souls which God had committed to his charge, and this petition which he put up to God with great ardour and charity, was granted.

The slaughter was already begun, when a Magian who happened to be travelling that way, with his wife, two children, and several servants, seeing the crowd, rode up through the people with a servant before him, to see what the matter was. He beheld the venerable abbot standing joyful, singing the divine praises, and taking each monk by the hand as they passed, as if it were to deliver them to the executioner. The Acts say he saw also a bright cross of fire shining over the bodies of the slain. Whether he had been before inclined to the Christian religion, or owed his conversion wholly to a sudden extraordinary light, he became on the spot a perfect Christian: and being moved by a strong impulse of divine grace, felt in himself an earnest desire to make one in that blessed company. He therefore alighted from his horse, changed clothes with his servant, and whispered in the abbot’s ear, begging to be admitted into the happy number of his holy troop, as he was united with them in faith and desire. The abbot assenting, he passed through his hands after the ninth, and was beheaded by the executioner, who did not know him. He was succeeded by the eleventh martyr. Last of all, the venerable Barsabias, the father of these martyrs, presented his neck to the executioner.

The bodies of these twelve saints were left to be devoured by the wild beasts and birds of prey; but their heads were brought to the city, and set up in the temple of Nahitis, or Venus. For, though the Magians detested all idols, there were several sects of idolaters in many parts of Persia. The example of the Magian martyr moved his wife, children, and whole family zealously to profess the Christian faith. These martyrs suffered on the 3d day of June, in the third year of the great persecution of Sapor, the thirty-third of his reign, of Christ 342. St. Barsabias is commemorated both in the Greek Menologies and in the Roman Martyrology on the 11th of December. See the Chaldaic Acts of these martyrs, published by Monsignor Stephen Assemani, Acta Mart. Orient. t. 1.

== See also ==
- Martyrs of Persia under Shapur II

== Sources ==
- Butler, Alban (1799), The Lives of the Primitive Fathers, Martyrs, and Other Principal Saints..., J. Moir This article incorporates text from this source, which is in the public domain.
- St. Augustine's Abbey, Ramsgate (1921), The Book of saints : a dictionary of servants of God canonized by the Catholic Church, London: A. & C. Black, ltd. This article incorporates text from this source, which is in the public domain.
