= Liu Xian (Later Zhao) =

General and emperor of Later Zhao

Liu Xian (Chinese: 劉顯; died 352) was a military general of the Later Zhao dynasty and ruler during the Sixteen Kingdoms period. During the Ran Wei–Later Zhao War, he defected to Ran Wei and assassinated the Zhao emperor, Shi Zhi, thus ending the Later Zhao. However, he then betrayed Wei and declared himself emperor in Zhao's capital, Xiangguo, but was eventually defeated and killed in 352.

== Life ==
Virtually nothing is known about Liu Xian’s background, except that he worked as a general under the Later Zhao. In 351, the Emperor of Zhao, Shi Zhi, ordered him to lead 70,000 men and attack the Heavenly King of Wei, Ran Min, at Yecheng. Liu Xian marched to Mingguang Palace (明光宮), just 23 li (approx. 9.5 km) away from the city. Initially, Ran Min was startled by Liu Xian's arrival, but he eventually decided to bring his army out fight. Ran Min dealt Liu Xian a decisive defeat and pursued him to Yangping (陽平郡; in present-day Qingfeng County, Henan), killing 30,000 of Liu Xian's troops in the process.

Ran Min's victory frightened Liu Xian into submission. In order to prove his worth, Liu Xian promised Ran Min that he would assassinate Shi Zhi for him. Ran Min believed him and allowed him to return to the Zhao capital, Xiangguo. In the summer of 351, Liu Xian killed Shi Zhi, the Prime Minister, Shi Bing (石炳), the Grand Governor, Zhao Shu (趙庶) and many others, totalling more than ten people. He then sent their heads to Yecheng, where Ran Min had Shi Zhi's head burnt in public. Later Zhao was at its end. For his contributions, Ran Min appointed Liu Xian as Supreme Grand General, Grand Chanyu and Governor of Jizhou.

However, just three months later, Liu Xian betrayed Ran Min and attacked him at Yecheng. He was once again defeated and retreated back to Xiangguo, where he declared himself as the new emperor. In early 352, Liu Xian attacked Ran Wei at Changshan Commandery, prompting Ran Min march out with 8,000 cavalries to repel him. Meanwhile, Liu Xian's Grand Marshal, Liu Ning (劉寧), surrendered Zaoqiang (棗強, in modern Hengshui, Hebei) to Wei. Ran Min defeated Liu Xian and chased him back to Xiangguo. Liu Xian's Grand General, Cao Fuju (曹伏駒), opened the gates and allowed Ran Min's army to enter. As a result, Ran Min massacred Liu Xian and his followers before burning down the city palaces and forcibly relocating the population to Yecheng.
