= Abdecalas =

Saint Abdecalas

Priest, Martyr
- Born: 3rd century AD
- Died: 345 AD; Good Friday; Sassanian Empire
- Venerated in: Eastern Orthodox Church; Assyrian Church of the East; Oriental Orthodox Church; Roman Catholic Church
- Canonized: Pre-congregation
- Feast: 21 April

Abdecalas, also known as Abdelas, was a Persian priest and martyr, who together with another priest called Ananias, and about a hundred other Christians, was killed under the Persian ruler Shapur II on Good Friday, 345. One of these others was also named Abdecalas.

Simeon, bishop of Seleucia, had been arrested by order of Sapor, king of Persia. He refused to adore the sun and was thrown in a narrow prison and remained there for a long time together with other 100 Christians, such as bishops, priests and clerks. The following day, which was a Good Friday, all his companions were strangled in his presence and he was beheaded. Abdecalas and Ananias, his priests, were martyred with him. They were the persons of distinguished merits.

The historian Sozomen estimates the number of Christians martyred during the forty-year reign of Shapur as close to 16,000. The feast day for Saint Abdecalas is 21 April.
