= Battle of Liantai =

Battle between the Ran Wei and Former Yan (352)

Date	17 May 352 CE
Location	Liantai, Ji Province (west of present-day Wuji County, Hebei)
Result	Former Yan victory

Belligerents
Ran Wei	Former Yan

Commanders and leaders
Ran Min (executed)	Murong Jun; Murong Ke; Feng Yi

Strength
Unknown, but less than Yan.	Unknown, but more than Wei.

Battle of Liantai
- Traditional Chinese: 廉台之戰
- Simplified Chinese: 廉台之战
Transcriptions
Standard Mandarin
- Hanyu Pinyin: Liántái zhī zhàn

The Battle of Liantai (simplified Chinese: 廉台之战; traditional Chinese: 廉台之戰; pinyin: Liántái zhī zhàn) was fought between the states of Former Yan and Ran Wei on 17 May 352 AD during the Sixteen Kingdoms period of China. The battle concluded with the capture of the Wei emperor, Ran Min and a decisive victory for the Yan, establishing the Murong-Xianbei as the dominant power on the Central Plains for years to come.

== Background ==
In 350, the Later Zhao dynasty in northern China underwent a rapid collapse as the prince, Ran Min, formerly known as Shi Min, took the capital of Ye by force and founded his new state of Wei. Many Zhao generals rejected his authority, breaking away to form their own states such as the Di-led Former Qin, while the prince, Shi Zhi challenged his claim from the old capital of Xiangguo. With the Zhao in disorder, the Eastern Jin dynasty in the south began launching northern expeditions to reclaim lost lands, and in the northeast, the Former Yan dynasty, led by the Murong clan of Xianbei ethnicity, saw an opportunity to expand their influence into the Central Plains.

== Prelude ==
By February 352, Ran Min had exterminated the Shi clan and conquered Xiangguo from his general-turned-rebel, Liu Xian. However, while he was at war with Zhao, the Yan had penetrated as far as Zhongshan and Bohai commanderies to the north, even moving their capital westwards from Longcheng to Jicheng. After his victory at Xiangguo, Ran Min left the city with his army to scour for food around Changshan and Zhongshan commanderies, but on 5 May 352, the Prince of Yan, Murong Jun ordered his brother, Murong Ke, and the Chancellor of State, Feng Yi, to invade Wei from Zhongshan and Bohai respectively.

In response to Yan's invasion, Ran Min wanted to fight Murong Ke in direct battle. He was opposed by his generals, Dong Run (董閏) and Zhang Wen (張溫), who argued that the Yan outnumbered them and were still reeling from their recent string of victories. Instead, they proposed that they take the time to recruit more soldiers while they wait for the Yan to grow complacent and strike at the right time. However, Ran Min was enraged and reportedly said, "I am heading out with the army to conquer You province and kill Murong Jun! If I turn my back on Murong Ke now, the people will make a mockery of me!" Two officials, Liu Mao (劉茂) and Lang Kai (郎闓), were certain that Ran Min would not return from his campaign and killed themselves.

Meanwhile, Murong Jun also led his main force out of Jicheng to camp at Zhongshan, providing support to Murong Ke and Feng Yi, but also to another brother, Murong Ba, who was on a separate campaign against the warlord, Duan Qin at Yimu (繹幕; northwest of present-day Pingyuan County, Shandong).

== The battle ==
Ran Min led his troops to Anxi County (安喜; east of present-day Dingzhou, Hebei), enticing Murong Ke to march there as well. He then marched towards Changshan Commandery with Murong Ke pursuing from behind. On 17 May, Murong Ke's forces finally caught up with Ran Min at Liantai (廉台; located west of present-day Wuji County, Hebei). Ran Min was known for his valour and his soldiers were hardened, so the Yan troops were fearful of them. They fought ten initial bouts with each other, all of which were won by Wei. Murong Ke soon met his officers and soldiers in his camp to raise their morale, telling them, "Ran Min is brave but without strategy; our enemy is but one man! His soldiers are hungry and tired, and though equipped with the best weapons and armours, they are difficult to use. They will not break us!"

Most of Murong Ke's soldiers were cavalry units, while Ran Min had mostly infantry. Ran Min decided to lead his soldiers into a nearby forest, hoping to lure the Yan cavalry into fighting in a disadvantegous terrain. However, Murong Ke's advisor, Gao Kai (高開) saw through his strategy and urged Ke to keep the battle in the open field. He further advised his commander to send light cavalries after them and then feign retreat, luring them to an ambush on level ground. Murong Ke adopted his plan.

The light cavalry were successful in their task, and Murong Ke divided his forces into three. Ke presumed that Ran Min thought highly of his own military prowess, and being outnumbered, he would be desperate to win the battle in one blow. Acting as bait, Ke commanded the central division, while the other two waited in hiding until the battle began. He also picked 5,000 of his best archers and placed them at the front on horses, linked together with iron chains in a square formation.

As Murong Ke predicted, Ran Min emerged on his horse, Zhulong (朱龍; "Red Dragon") with his soldiers. Seeing the large banner among the Yan force, Ran Min realized he had encountered their main camp and charged ahead. The Annals of the Sixteen Kingdoms describe Ran Min as dual-wielding a twin-headed spear in his left hand and a hooked halberd in his right hand; he plunged into battle and was said to have killed 300 Yan soldiers himself. Soon, the two Yan divisions appeared and attacked Ran Min from two sides. The Wei army was greatly defeated, and Ran Min was surrounded. He fought his way out of the encirclement and attempted to flee east on his horse. However, Zhulong suddenly died, and Ran Min was apprehended by Yan soldiers.

== Aftermath ==
=== Death of Ran Min ===
On 20 May, Ran Min arrived at Jicheng and was brought before Murong Jun, who declared a general amnesty. Jun chastised Ran Min for declaring himself emperor, referring to him as a "bond-servant slave". In response, Ran Min said, "The world is in ruins and you barbarians with human faces but beastly hearts have the gall to claim the throne. Why can't I, a hero of the ages, make myself emperor?" Furious, Jun had Ran Min whipped 300 times before sending him to Longcheng.

Ran Min was later executed on 1 June. Not long after his death, a drought broke out and there were locust swarms. Murong Jun, believing that he had offended Ran Min's spirit, offered him sacrifice and posthumously named him Heavenly King Wudao.

=== Fall of Ye ===
On 25 May, Murong Jun sent his uncle, Murong Ping, and the Commandant of the Capital, Hou Kan (侯龕) with 10,000 cavalry to attack the Wei capital, Ye, where Ran Min's young crown prince, Ran Zhi and Empress Dong were still holding out. The defense was led by the general, Jiang Gan (蔣干), who kept the city gates closed while those outside surrendered to Yan. There was no food in the city, and the inhabitants resorted to cannibalism, eating many of the palace attendants from the old Zhao regime. Jiang Gan offered his submission to Jin and requested the general, Xie Shang to lift the siege. On 31 May, Murong Jūn, Muyu Gen, Huangfu Zhen and other Yan generals arrived to reinforce Murong Ping.

Xie Shang sent his general, Dai Shi (戴施) to aid Jiang Gan. Dai Shi brought more than a hundred men into Ye, but on 4 July, Jiang Gan and the Jin soldiers sallied out to give fight and were badly routed by Murong Ping. On 8 September, the Wei general, Ma Yuan (馬願) opened the gates for the Yan attackers. Ran Zhi, Empress Dong and their officials were all brought to Jicheng, where Murong Jun declared that he had received the imperial seal from the empress.

With the destruction of the short-lived Ran Wei, the Former Yan asserted its dominance over the Central Plains. On 4 January 353, Murong Jun declared himself Emperor, formally breaking away from the Eastern Jin dynasty after decades of vassalage. Though some parts of the Central Plains had yet to submit, the Former Yan would go on conquer them and form a three-way confrontation with the Eastern Jin to the south and the Former Qin to the west.

== Sources ==
- Li, Bo; Zheng Yin (2001) 5000 years of Chinese history, Inner Mongolian People's publishing corp, ISBN 7-204-04420-7 [in Chinese]
