= Potamon of Heraclea =

Saint Potamon of Heraclea
- Residence: Heraclea in Egypt
- Died: c. 341; Egypt
- Beatified: Pre-congregation
- Feast: 18 May

Saint Potamon of Heraclea (or Potamon of Alexandria, Potamone, Potamion; died c. 341) was a bishop of Heraclea in Egypt who was persecuted under the emperor Maximinus Daza, attended the First Council of Nicaea, then was martyred in Egypt by the Arians. His feast day is 18 May.

== Roman Martyrology ==
The Roman Martyrology of 1914 has an entry under May 18;

In Egypt, Saint Potamon, bishop, a confessor under Maximian Galerius, and afterwards a martyr under the emperor Constantius, and the Arian governor Philagrius.

== Monks of Ramsgate account ==
The monks of St Augustine's Abbey, Ramsgate wrote in their Book of Saints (1921),

Potamion (St.) Bp., M. (May 18)
(4th cent.) An Egyptian Bishop who suffered imprisonment as a Christian under the Emperor Galerius, and who, after the Peace of the Church, assisted at the Council of Nicaea (A.D. 325). True to the Catholic Faith, he shared with St. Athanasius his exile. And it is St. Athanasius who relates how the Arians compassed the death of the holy Martyr, about A.D. 340.

== Butler's account ==
The hagiographer Alban Butler (1710–1773) wrote in his Lives of the Fathers, Martyrs, and Other Principal Saints under May 18,

St. Potamon, M. He was bishop of Heraclea in Egypt. St. Athanasius says he was doubly a martyr, under the heathens and under the Arians. When Maximinus Daia, or Daza, persecuted the Christians in 310, he gloriously confessed the faith, for which one of his eyes was bored out, and probably the sinews of one ham were cut, as in the case of St. Paphnutius and others. The marks of his sufferings rendered him conspicuous in the council of Nice in 325, in which he exerted his zeal against the Arians. He accompanied and defended St. Athanasius in the council of Tyre in 335, as was related in the life of that saint on the 2nd of May. When the tyrant Gregory had usurped the patriarchal chair of St. Athanasius, he, with Philagrius, prefect of Egypt, an apostate to Arianism under Constantius, travelled over all Egypt, tormenting and banishing the Catholics; and St. Potamon, for his distinguished zeal, was by their order beaten on his back with clubs so long as to be left for dead. However, by the help of medicines, he came to himself, but died shortly after a martyr for the divinity of the Son of God in 341, as St. Athanasius relates. See St. Athanasius, Ep. ad Solit. et Apolog. Rufin. l. 2. c. 4. St. Epiph. Hær. 68.

== Sources ==
- Butler, Alban (1798), The Lives of the Primitive Fathers, Martyrs, and Other Principal Saints, Edinburgh: J. Moir
- Cardinal James Gibbons, ed. (1914), "This Day, the Eighteenth Day of May", Roman Martyrology
- St. Augustine's Abbey, Ramsgate (1921), The Book of saints : a dictionary of servants of God canonized by the Catholic Church, London: A. & C. Black, ltd. This article incorporates text from this source, which is in the public domain.
