= Tao Bao =

Later Zhao general

- 桃豹

Grand Guardian (太保)
- In office ? – 340
- Monarch: Shi Hu

Personal details
- Born: Unknown
- Died: 22 January 340
- Courtesy name: Anbu (安步)

Tao Bao (died 22 January 340), courtesy name Anbu, was a military general of Later Zhao during China's Sixteen Kingdoms period. Being one of Shi Le's Eighteen Riders, his most notable activities were his battles with Zu Ti, in which he defended the city of Pengguan (蓬關, in modern-day Chenliu, Henan) and also helping Shi Le during his final push against Liu Yao in 328. He served up to Shi Hu's reign before dying in January 340. His name can be rendered as Yao Bao.

== Life ==
Tao Bao was from Fanyang Commandery and was known in his hometown for his bravery and skill at horse riding. Once, Tao Bao boastingly declared, "A man who has met Wei Taizu and not be a marquis of 10,000 households or among his top generals is not a real man." Those with him at the time laughed at him but Tao Bao raised his voice at them, "You sons of rats, how could you possibly comprehend the aspirations of a lordly man who transforms like a leopard?”

Like all those who joined Shi Le in 304, he became one of his Eighteen Riders and roamed the land as a bandit. When Shi Le occupied Julu and Changshan, Tao Bao became one of his "talon and teeth" (爪牙) together with Zhi Xiong, Kong Chang, Kui An and Lu Ming (逯明).

In 313, Tao Bao was made Administrator of Wei Commandery after Shi Le conquered Yecheng. He was later replaced by Shi Le's nephew Shi Hu.

During Zu Ti's northern expedition in 319, he attacked the Administrator of Chenliu, Chen Chuan (陳川) at Pengguan after Chen betrayed him. Shi Le sent Tao Bao to reinforce Chen Chuan, and Tao Bao managed to drive back Zu Ti to Huainan. Tao Bao guarded the city while Shi Hu relocated Chen Chuan and his followers to Xiangguo.

Going into the following year, Zu Ti's general Han Qian (韓潛) occupied the eastern half of the city while Tao Bao held the western one. Tao Bao and Han Qian held on to their part of the city for 40 days. Tao Bao's men were starting to become hungry, so they raided one of Zu Ti's supply convoy. The transporters simply abandoned the rice, and when Tao Bao's men discovered the excess amount of rice they were carrying, they believed that Zu Ti's men were better fed and started to worry. Supplies from the Later Zhao general Liu Yetang (劉夜堂) was intercepted by Zu Ti, leaving Tao Bao with little to no rations. Tao Bao fled Pengguan to camp at Dongye instead, but Zu Ti ordered Han Qian to pressure him while they occupy Pengguan. The loss of Pengguan placed a strain on Later Zhao's borders, so Shi Le negotiated peace with Zu Ti.

In 328, Shi Le campaigned against his rival Liu Yao of Former Zhao. Tao Bao led his forces to Xingyang to join Shi Le in his assault on Luoyang. Shi Le captured Liu Yao while his sons Liu Yin and Liu Xi were killed by Shi Hu the following year.

Tao Bao's last contribution would be 338, during Later Zhao and Former Yan's assault on the Duan Tribe. Tao Bao was made General Who Traverses The Sea and ordered to attack from Piaoyu Crossing (漂渝津, around present-day Cangzhou, Hebei). On 22 January 340, Tao Bao died, holding the office of Grand Guardian.
