= Kui An =

Later Zhao minister and general

- 夔安

General of Central Firmness (中堅將軍)
- In office ?–?
- Monarch: Liu Cong

Marshal of the Right (左司馬)
- In office ?–330
- Monarch: Shi Le

Master of Writing (尚書)
- In office 330–?
- Monarch: Shi Le

General Who Guards the Army (鎮軍將軍)
- In office ?–333
- Monarch: Shi Hong

Palace Attendant (侍中)
- In office 334–?
- Monarch: Shi Hu

Grand Commandant (太尉)
- In office 334–?
- Monarch: Shi Hu

Grand Commander (大都督)
- In office 339–340
- Monarch: Shi Hu

Prefect of the Masters of Writing (尚書令)
- In office ?–340
- Monarch: Shi Hu

Personal details
- Born: Unknown Tianzhu, India
- Died: 340
- Relations: Kui Teng (descendant)

Kui An (died c.October 340) was a Tianzhu military general and minister of Later Zhao during the Sixteen Kingdoms period. He was one of Shi Le's earliest followers as a member of his Eighteen Riders (十八騎). He later became a partisan of Shi Hu's faction and grew to become a prominent minister in his regime. His most notable accomplishment was thwarting an attempted invasion by the influential Eastern Jin general Yu Liang in 339.

== Life ==
=== Service under Shi Le ===
According to the Song dynasty encyclopedia, "A Critical Review to Old and New Books on Family Names" (古今姓氏書辯證), Kui An was originally a man from Tianzhu (the historical East Asian name for India) but later moved to Liaodong. After Shi Le was freed from slavery in 304, Shi Le organized a group of bandit with the help of his friend Ji Sang. Kui An joined him that year and became one of Shi Le's Eighteen Riders. Following Shi Le's conquest of Julu and Changshan in 309, Shi Le appointed Kui An as his "talon and teeth" (爪牙) along with Zhi Xiong, Kong Chang, Tao Bao and Lu Ming (逯明).

Kui An followed Shi Le in his failed expedition to Jiankang in 312. Half of the army suffered from plague, starvation and flooding while the army of Sima Rui was approaching them, so Shi Le assembled his general and advisors to discuss their next move. Kui An proposed that they move to higher ground to get away from the water, which Shi Le replied, "General, why are you so cowardly?" In the end, following Zhang Bin's advice, Shi Le decided to abandon the campaign for a campaign in Yecheng instead.

In 312, Kui An and the others were sent to besiege the city of Yuanxiang (苑鄕, in present-day Hebei and Beijing) against You Lun (游綸) and Zhang Chai, who had surrendered to the Youzhou warlord Wang Jun. This incited Wang to send his forces to Shi Le's capital in Xiangguo but Shi managed to repel them. In the end, You Lun and Zhang Chai surrendered back to Shi Le. According to the dubious biography of Fotudeng in the Book of Jin, during the defence of Xiangguo, Kui An was sent by Shi Le to speak to Fotudeng to reassure him about his prediction that the enemy general Duan Mobo would be captured.

After this, Kui An would be absent from the records for a long period of time. He would only be mentioned again in 330 when Shi Le claimed the imperial title after destroying Former Zhao. Shi Le handed out new government positions to his followers including Kui An, who was made one of the Masters of Writing.

=== Service under Shi Hu ===
Kui An was a partisan of Shi Le's nephew, Shi Hu, who harboured ambitions to seize power in the court away from Shi Le and his family. After Shi Le died and was succeeded by his son Shi Hong in 333, Shi Hu almost immediately launched a coup and placed the young Shi Hong under his control. Shi Hu replaced the ministers in Shi Hong's court with members of his own faction. This included Kui An, who Shi Hu made acting Deputy Director of the Left.

In 334, Shi Hu had Shi Hong killed and took the throne for himself. As a result, Kui An was further made Palace Attendant, Grand Commandant, and acting Prefect of the Masters of Writing. By 337, Kui An was holding the important position of Grand Guardian. That year, he along with more than 500 officials suggested to Shi Hu to take the imperial title. Shi Hu agreed and made himself Heavenly King of Zhao.

=== Routing Yu Liang ===
In 339, Jin's minister Yu Liang was planning to hold a grand invasion against Later Zhao. He camped his generals Mao Bao and Fan Jun (樊俊) at Zhucheng (邾城, in modern Huanggang, Hubei), but this proved to be a fatal mistake. Shi Hu was able to detect Yu Liang's movements, so he quickly ordered Kui An to lead an army to attack the Jin forces first, with the generals Shi Jian, Shi Min, Li Nong, Zhang Hedu and Li Tu (李菟) under his command. Kui An brought the generals to invade the northern borders of Jingzhou and Yangzhou while sending 20,000 cavalry to attack Zhucheng.

In September, Shi Min defeated the armies south of the Mian River and killed their general Cai Huai (蔡懷). Kui An and Li Nong then proceeded to capture Jin's territories south of the river. Elsewhere, the Zhao general Zhu Bao (朱保) won a victory at Baishi, where he killed Zheng Bao (鄭豹) as well as four other officers while Zhang Hao captured Zhucheng, killing 6,000 Jin troops in the process. Mao Bao and Fan Jun both drowned Yangzi after breaking through the Zhao encirclement and attempting to flee.

Kui An then captured Huting (胡亭; northwest of present-day Anlu, Hubei) and invaded Jiangxia. The Jin commanders at Yiyang (義陽, in modern Xinyang, Henan), Huang Chong (黃沖) and Zheng Jin (鄭進), both surrendered to Kui An. Kui set his eyes on Shicheng (石城; in present-day Zhongxiang, Hubei) but the Administrator of Jingling, Li Yang (李陽) mounted an impregnable defence and finally managed to put a stop to his advances. Kui An lost 5,000 men against Li Yang, so he decided to retreat east of the Han River, sacking and pillaging the area while relocating 7,000 households to Youzhou and Jizhou.

Kui An's attack proved devastating for Jin as their initial campaign to reclaim territory up north only resulted in losing land as well as people to Zhao. After the fall of Zhucheng, Yu Liang cancelled his plans and voluntarily demoted himself before dying the following year. Kui An died a year later in c.October 340, holding the office of Prefect of the Masters of Writing.

=== Descendant ===
Kui Teng (夔騰), who was from Liaodong, was said to be a descendant of Kui An. He served in Former Qin, and following its decline in 383, he along with a few others including Cui Hong fled to Jin, where they were given administrative posts of commanderies in Jizhou and led forces from south of the Yellow River. However, they were all bought over with ranks and titles by the Dingling-Zhai clan of Wei. The Zhais were defeated in 392 by Later Yan, so Kui Teng and the others surrender to Yan. Yan's ruler, Murong Chui, accepted them and allowed them to hold offices in his government.
