= Li Nong =

Later Zhao and Ran Wei minister and general

- 李農

Grand Governor (太宰)
- In office 350 – 350
- Monarch: Ran Min

Grand Marshal (大司馬)
- In office 349 – 350
- Monarch: Shi Jian/Shi Min

Personal details
- Born: Unknown
- Died: 350
- Children: Three unnamed sons
- Occupation: Military general, Politician

Li Nong (died c.June 350) was a Chinese military general and politician of the Later Zhao and Ran Wei dynasties during the Sixteen Kingdoms period. He was a notable official under Later Zhao's emperor Shi Hu, fighting against the Jin and Former Yan dynasties. When conflict between Shi Hu's family and his adopted ethnic Han grandson Shi Min (who later changed his name to Ran Min) arose in 349, he allied with the latter and helped bring upon the collapse of Later Zhao. However, just a year after, Li Nong and his family were executed by Ran Min for unspecified reasons.

== Early career ==
=== Early career ===
Li Nong first appeared in history in 335. At the time, he was already Shi Hu's Minister over the Masses who he tasked in paying respects to the Buddhist monk Fotudeng and check on his health twice daily.

In 339, the Jin commander, Yu Liang, who had long intended to launch a campaign against Later Zhao, unknowingly provoked Shi Hu by camping at Zhucheng (邾城, in modern Huanggang, Hubei). Knowing that an invasion was imminent, Shi Hu ordered five of his generals, of which Li Nong and Shi Min were a part of, led by Kui An to attack Jingzhou and Yangzhou and Yu's base at Zhucheng. In the attack, Li Nong managed to capture Jin territories south of the Mian river(沔水, a historical name for the Han River) together with Kui An. The overall assault was a major success for Later Zhao, as many Jin generals and soldiers either died or surrendered and territorial gains were made while Yu Liang decided to call off his invasion upon hearing the losses.

The same year, Li Nong was stationed at Lingzhi and appointed Commissioner Bearing Credentials, Chief of military affairs in Liaoxi and Beiping, General Who Conquers the East, and Governor of Yingzhou. He attacked the Former Yan city of Fancheng (凡城, in modern Kazuo County, Liaoning) but was repelled by Yue Wan.

=== Shi Hu's succession crisis ===
In 348, Shi Hu's eldest son and heir Shi Xuan (石宣) assassinated his brother Shi Tao (石韜) who was greatly favoured by their father. Shi Xuan announced his death to Shi Hu, who at the time did not know that Xuan was responsible for his death. Shi Hu intended to visit the body, but Li Nong prevented him, advising that the assassins were most likely still around. Soon enough, the truth was revealed, and Shi Hu had Shi Xuan brutally executed.

With his eldest and favourite dead, he was left with his youngest son Shi Shi, whose mother was Consort Liu, a favorite of Shi Hu. Shi Hu had Li Nong set a petition to have the ministers choose Shi Shi as Crown Prince. In 349, Shi Hu declared himself as emperor and granted a general amnesty. However, this amnesty did not include Shi Xuan's guards who were exiled to Liangzhou after his execution. In response, their captain Liang Du (梁犢) rebelled, and they marched towards Luoyang, defeating the Later Zhao generals in their way. Li Nong was made Grand General and sent to stop Liang Du's advance but was also defeated and forced to retreat. Fortunately for Shi Hu, Liang Du was eventually killed by Yao Yizhong.

== Death of Shi Hu and alliance with Shi Min ==
=== Reign of Shi Shi ===
Shi Hu died the same year he crowned himself emperor. Just after Shi Shi ascended the throne, an attempt on Li Nong's life was made. The Prime Minister Zhang Chai intended to get rid of Li Nong, who was the Minister of Works at the time. Li Nong's friend Zhang Ju (張舉), despite being a part of the plot, informed him before the plan could be carried due to their friendship. Li Nong took shelter at Shangbai (上白, in modern-day Guangzong County, Hebei) where he defended himself with the Qihuo troops whilst Empress Dowager Liu ordered Zhang Ju to besiege him.

=== Reign of Shi Zun ===
The siege was lifted when Shi Zun, Shi Hu's son through his former empress Zheng Yingtao, launched a coup against Shi Shi and Empress Dowager Liu and put them to death. Li Nong returned to court to explain his initial decision in supporting Shi Shi and was pardoned. Shi Zun's brother, Shi Chong (石沖) rebelled after knowing about Shi Shi's death intending to avenge him. Li Nong and Shi Min battled Shi Chong at Pingji (平棘, in modern day Zhao County, Hebei), where the latter's army was annihilated. Shi Chong was then forced to commit suicide.

Meanwhile, the Jin dynasty took notice of the Shi family's internal strife. The Jin minister Chu Pou was made Grand Commander to take advantage of it. As the people of Lu commandery offered their surrender to the Jin forces, Chu Pou sent Wang Kan (王龕) and Li Mai (李邁) to gather them. Li Nong fought them at Dai slope (代陂, east of present-day Tengzhou, Shandong) where he captured Wang Kan and killed Li Mai. The defeat forced Chu Pou to retreat south.

Although Shi Min had been a staunch supporter of Shi Zun, their relationship broke down when Zun did not appoint Min as the Crown Prince despite his promise. Discussions were made between Shi Zun, Empress Dowager Zheng, and the other princes on getting rid of Shi Min. However, one prince, Shi Jian decided to alert Shi Min of his plans. Shi Min forced Li Nong to conspire with him, and together they surrounded Shi Zun's house. They executed him along with the Empress Dowager and their loyal ministers.

=== Reign of Shi Jian ===
Shi Jian was installed as the new emperor, but real power was held by Shi Min and Li Nong, with Li being the Grand Marshal. During the two's time in power, numerous assassination attempts were made to remove them. The first was carried out by Shi Jian and his brother Shi Bao, who engineered a night raid but failed and was caught instead. Shi Jian pretended not to know anything of the plot, so he was spared while Shi Bao and the other perpetrators were executed. Another attempt by Shi Jian's family was made, consisting of Shi Cheng, Shi Chi and Shi Hui, although without Jian's knowledge, but all three were defeated and killed by Li Nong and Shi Min. The third plot was headed Sun Fudu (孫伏都) and Liu Zhu (劉銖), with both generals intending to restore the emperor's authority. When Shi Jian heard about their plan, he supported them wholeheartedly. Sun Fudu and Liu Zhu waited for Li Nong and Shi Min in the capital to ambush them, but they too were defeated. Shi Jian became fearful and turned on Sun Fudu. Much like the conspirators before, Shi Min and Li Nong killed Sun Fudu and his men.

In 350, Shi Min renamed the state of Zhao to Wei (衛) and changed the name of the Shi clan to Li, intending to eradicate the clan through a prophecy. This caused panic among the Shi and their ministers, who all fled to the Prince of Xinxing, Shi Zhi in Xiangguo. Most of Zhao's administrators such as Pu Hong and Yao Yizhong refused to submit to Shi Min and either broke away from the regime or joined forces with Shi Zhi. Finally, Shi Jian made one last attempt at killing Shi Min and Li Nong. He sent a eunuch to General Zhang Chen (張沈) to organize an attack on Yecheng but instead, the eunuch betrayed Shi Jian and revealed the plan, causing Shi Min and Li Nong to rush back to the capital. Shi Jian was executed and the remaining members of the Shi clan in the city were eradicated.

== Ran Wei and death ==
After Shi Jian's death, the minister Shen Zhong urged Shi Min to claim the title of emperor. Shi Min refused, declaring himself a subject of Jin and instead offered the throne to Li Nong, but he too declined. Thus, in the end, Shi Min took the throne and established his state of Wei (魏). Shi Min also changed his family name back to Ran, and appointed Li Nong as Grand Governor and Prince of Qi. His sons were also made dukes.

Li Nong would not hold his new titles for long, as he and his three sons were executed as a part of a government purge by Ran Min. The exact reasons for his death were unknown.
