= Battle of Cibalae =

316 AD battle between the Roman emperors Constantine I and Licinius

- Part of Civil wars of the Tetrarchy
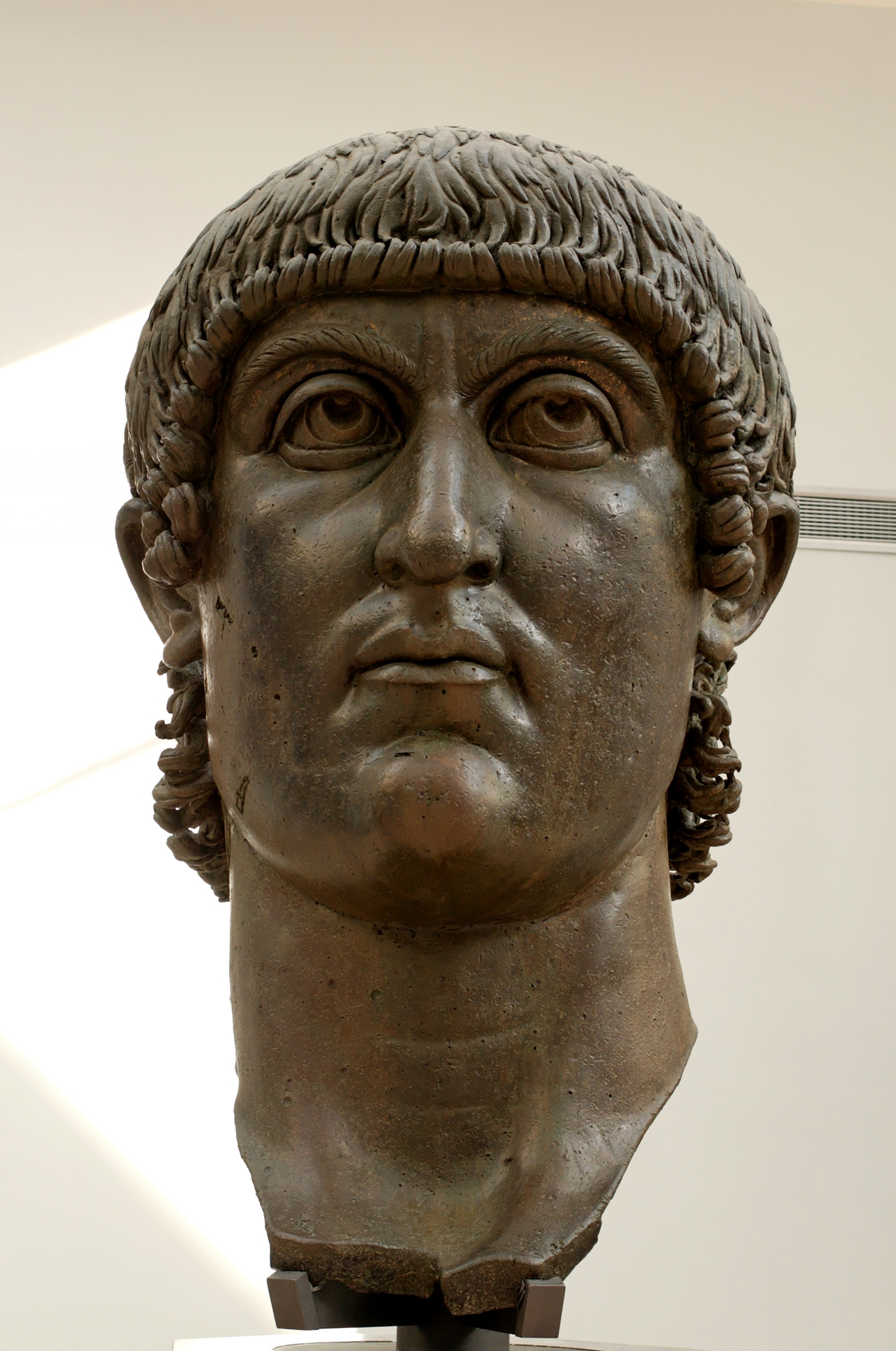
- Constantine, bronze head from a sculpture, Capitoline Museums, Rome
Date	AD 316
Location	Colonia Aurelia Cibalae (modern Vinkovci, Croatia) 45°17′00″N 18°48′00″E
Result	Constantinian victory

Belligerents
Constantine the Great	Licinius

Commanders and leaders
Constantine	Licinius

Strength
20,000	35,000

Casualties and losses
Unknown	20,000
- Location within Croatia

The Battle of Cibalae was fought in 316 between the two Roman emperors Constantine I (r. 306–337) and Licinius (r. 308–324). The site of the battle, near the town of Cibalae (now Vinkovci, Croatia) in the Roman province of Pannonia Secunda, was approximately 350 kilometers within the territory of Licinius. Constantine won a resounding victory, despite being outnumbered.

== Background ==
The hostilities were prompted by Constantine's appointment of his brother-in-law, Bassianus, as Caesar. Bassianus was discovered to be intriguing against Constantine, perhaps at the prodding of his own brother Senecio, a close associate of Licinius. When Constantine demanded that Licinius hand over Senecio, Licinius refused. Constantine marched against Licinius, who responded by elevating another associate, Valens. The date of Valens' elevation as emperor probably occurred after the Battle of Cibalae.

The unreliable fasti (chronicles) of Hydatius dates the battle to 8 October 314, but the remaining literary and numismatics evidence point to the battle being fought in 316.

== Battle ==
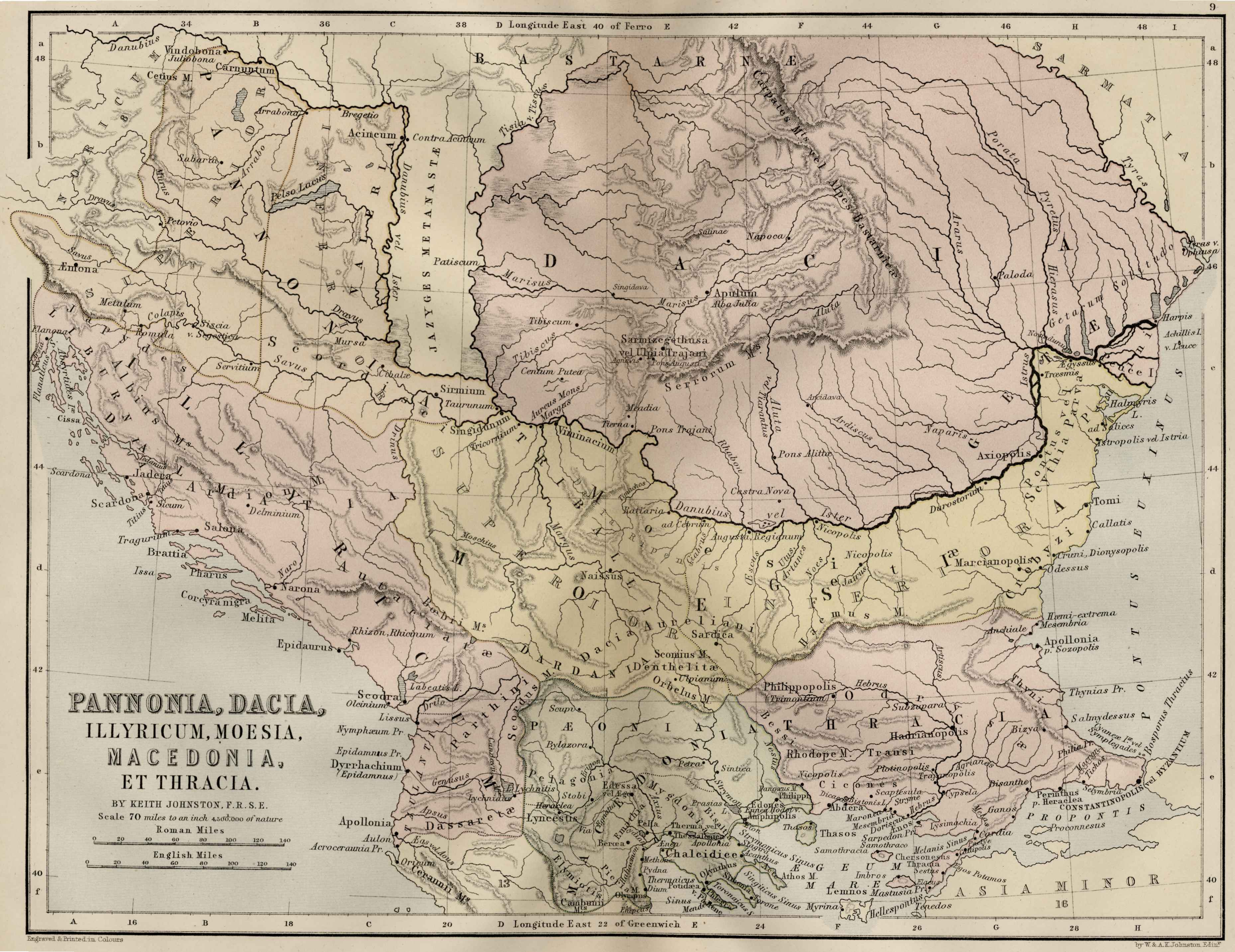
The Danubian Provinces of Rome. Cibalae is shown, located in the SE part of Pannonia.

The opposing armies met on the plain between the rivers Sava and Drava near the town of Cibalae (Vinkovci). The battle lasted all day. The battle opened with Constantine's forces arrayed in a defile adjacent to mountain slopes. The army of Licinius was stationed on lower ground nearer the town of Cibalae; Licinius took care to secure his flanks. As the infantry of Constantine needed to move forward through broken ground, the cavalry was thrown out ahead to act as a screen. Constantine moved his formation down on to the more open ground and advanced against the awaiting Licinians. Following a period of skirmishing and intense missile fire at a distance, the opposing main bodies of infantry met in close combat and fierce hand-to-hand combat ensued. This battle of attrition was ended, late in the day, when Constantine personally led a cavalry charge from the right wing of his army. The charge was decisive, Licinius' ranks were broken. As many as 20,000 of Licinius' troops were killed in the hard-fought battle. The surviving cavalry of the defeated army accompanied Licinius when he fled the field under the cover of darkness.

== Aftermath ==
Following the battle Licinius was forced to flee to Sirmium (Sremska Mitrovica, Serbia), and then, after collecting his family and treasury, to Thrace. Peace negotiations were initiated, but they broke down. A further battle was then fought, the Battle of Mardia, which proved to be indecisive. Heavy losses were suffered by both sides. Following the battle, in expectation of Licinius retreating on Byzantium, Constantine advanced in the direction of this city. However, Licinius had withdrawn northwards and this placed him across Constantine's lines of communication, Constantine also lost much of his baggage to Licinius. A treaty highly favorable to Constantine was subsequently negotiated; this included the ceding by Licinius of the greater part of the Balkan Peninsula and the elevation of Constantine's sons, Crispus (then about 16/17) and Constantine II (who was only an infant), with Licinius' young son (Licinius II), to the rank of caesar. Licinius then deposed and executed his erstwhile co-emperor Valens.
