= Ran Wei =

Short-lived Chinese state (350–352)

Wei 魏
- 350–352
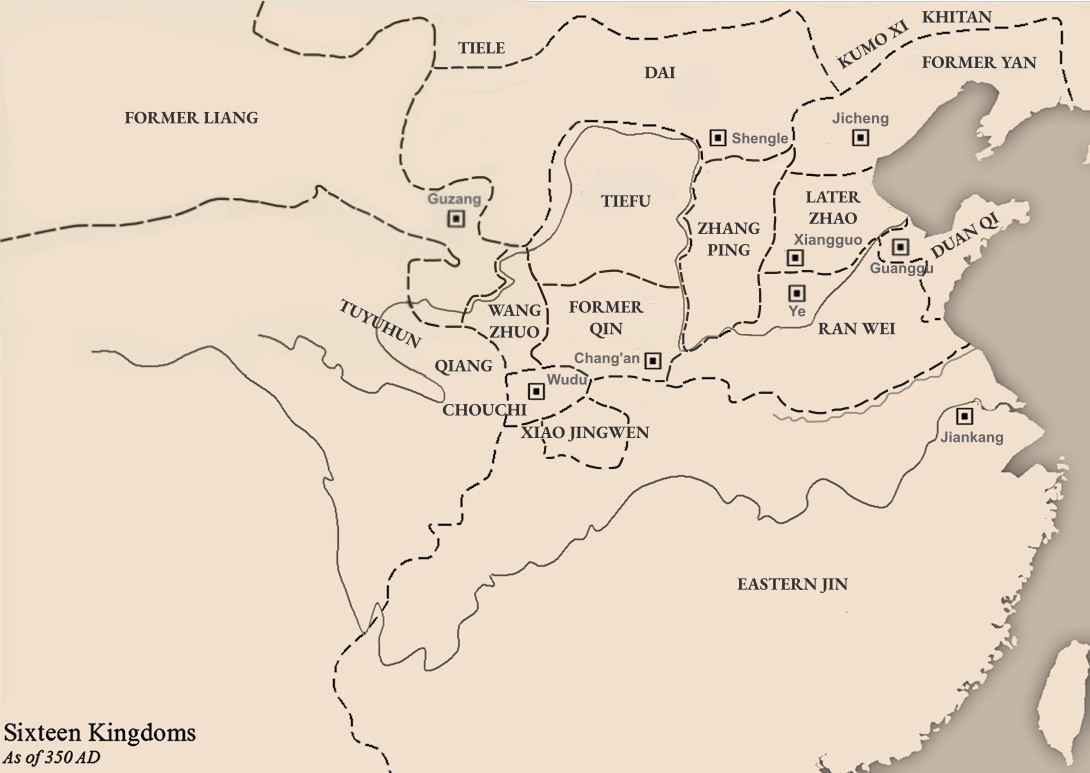
- Ran Wei in 350 AD
- Capital: Ye
- Government: Monarchy
- Emperor
  - 350–352: Ran Min
- Crown Prince
  - 352: Ran Zhi
- Historical era: Sixteen Kingdoms
  - Established: 350
  - Ran Min's capture by Former Yan: 17 May 352
  - Ran Min's death: 1 June 352
  - Disestablished: 8 September 352
Preceded by	Succeeded by
Later Zhao	Former Yan; Eastern Jin
- Today part of: China

Wei (Chinese: 魏; 350–352), known as Ran Wei (冉魏) in Chinese historiography, was a short-lived dynastic state of China established by Ran Min. In 350, Ran Wei usurped the throne of the Later Zhao dynasty in the city of Ye and declared himself Emperor of Wei. In 352, Ran Wei was conquered by the Former Yan dynasty shortly after the Battle of Liantai.

== History ==
=== Background ===
Ran Min was the son of Ran Zhan, a Han Chinese who was living with the Qihuo army during the fall of Western Jin before his capture by the Jie warlord and future founder of the Later Zhao dynasty, Shi Le in 310. Ran Zhan grew to impress Shi Le with his abilities, and as per the Shi clan's unusual practice of heavily adopting people into their families, he advised his distant cousin and adoptive brother, Shi Hu, to adopt Ran Zhan as his own son. Hence, Ran Zhan became known as Shi Zhan.

As Shi Hu's adoptive grandson, Shi Min was shown exceptional favour by his grandfather. He served as a military general for Later Zhao during Shi Hu's reign and fought with distinction in campaigns against the Eastern Jin in the south and Former Yan in the northeast. After Shi Hu's death in 349, Shi Min was among the many military generals who conspired to overthrow the new emperor, Shi Shi. In return for supporting him, Shi Min was promised the role of Crown Prince by his uncle, Shi Zun. However, after Shi Shi was deposed, Shi Zun reneged on his promise by appointing another nephew as Crown Prince.

As Shi Zun attempted to kill him, Shi Min, with the help of the official Li Nong, led his troops to overthrow him and installed his uncle, Shi Jian as the new emperor as Ye. By this point, the Later Zhao was on the verge of collapse, with rebellions breaking out and neighboring states looking to capitilazing of the confusion. Most infamously, after surviving multiple assassination attempts, Shi Min ordered his “Hu” culling mandate, ordering the Han Chinese to kill any Jie or “barbarian” people they find, resulting in 200,000 people, including mistakenly-identified Han Chinese, to be killed.

In 350, following the prophecy that “After Zhao, comes Li” (繼趙李), he changed the state name to Wey (衞) and forced the Shi clan to change their family names to Li (李). Many Zhao generals and governors refused to acknowledge Shi Min's authority, with some rallying around the prince, Shi Zhi at Xiangguo. After surviving another attempt on his life, Shi Min massacred Shi Jian and his family members in Ye. He initially offered the throne to Li Nong, but at the behest of his officials, he claimed the title of Emperor of Wei (魏).

=== Battle of Xiangguo ===
Most of the officials who joined Ran Min were from the Chinese Confucian gentry, and he reaffirmed their positions by promoting the Nine Schools of Thought and appointing them based on their talents. Soon after taking the throne, Ran Min purged Li Nong and several other officials in his government before sending an envoy to the Eastern Jin offering them to help him fight the "barbarians", although Jin rejected him. Despite all this, Ran Min also wanted to win back the support of the tribes, and so he claimed the title of Grand Chanyu for his son. There were also many Han Chinese who refused to align with him, remaining loyal to Later Zhao or join the Xianbei-led Former Yan in the northeast.

Ran Min's forces reached its peak after repelling a combined Zhao force at Cangting (倉亭; north of present-day Yanggu County, Shandong), boasting at 300,000 strong. He then led 100,000 soldiers to besiege Xiangguo, where Shi Zhi had declared himself the new emperor. After a hundred days of siege, Ran Min was defeated by the allied forces of Later Zhao and Former Yan. Shi Zhi sent a general, Liu Xian to attack Ran Min at Ye, but he was defeated and surrendered himself to Wei. At Ran Min's coercion, Liu Xian returned to Xiangguo and slaughtered Shi Zhi and his clan, thus ending the Later Zhao.

However, Liu Xian then betrayed Ran Min and declared himself the new Emperor of Zhao. Liu Xian attacked Wei but was repeatedly defeated, and Ran Min later chased him back to Xiangguo. A traitor opened the city gates to Ran Min, who killed Liu Xian along with his ministers and sacked the city before moving all the city inhabitants back to Ye.

=== War with Former Yan and fall ===
Although the Later Zhao was no more, Ran Min now faced a bigger threat in the form of Former Yan, which had been seizing Zhao territory with the goal of establishing itself on the Central Plains. He thus led a northern campaign to destroy Yan once and for all. He was met with an army led by the general, Murong Ke, the two fought a great battle at Liantai (廉台; in present-day Donghoufang Township, Hebei). While Ran Min was initially successful, his forces were eventually overwhelmed by Murong Ke's cavalry. He attempted to escape on horseback but was captured and sent to the Yan capital at Ji. There, he insulted the Yan emperor Murong Jun, claiming that his people were "barbarians and animals" (夷狄禽獸之類), and he was subsequently executed.

Ran Min's son and crown prince, Ran Zhi, was still at Ye when his father was captured. He mounted a defence when Yan forces laid siege on Ye, but a famine soon broke out, leading to widespread cannibalism within the city. Jin reinforcements failed to help lift the siege, and eventually, the city defenders opened the gates for the Yan forces. Ran Zhi was sent to Ji, where he was initially treated well and received a marquis title. However, in 354, he was implicated in a rebellion and later executed.

== Ruler ==
Temple names	Posthumous names	Family name and Given name	Durations of reigns	Era names and their according durations
Did not exist	Heavenly King Wudao (武悼天王 Wǔdào Tiānwáng)	冉閔 Rǎn Mǐn	350–352	Yongxing (永興 Yǒngxīng, lit. perpetual prosperity) 350–352
Did not exist	Did not exist	冉智 Rǎn Zhì	352	Yongxing 352

Note: Ran Zhi was Ran Min's crown prince who briefly held out in Ye before surrendering to Former Yan, but he never took the imperial title.
