= German campaign =

German campaign may refer to:

- Roman campaigns in Germania (12 BC – AD 16)
- German and Sarmatian campaigns of Constantine
- German Campaign of 1813
- German campaign in Angola, 1914–15
- Western Allied invasion of Germany, 1945
- Soviet invasion of Germany, 1945
