= Size of the Roman army =

By the size of the Roman army is meant the changes (increases and reductions) in the number of its contingents: legions, auxiliaries, Praetorian cohorts, Urban cohorts, vigiles, and naval forces over the course of twelve centuries – from 753 BC to AD 476 (the Fall of the Western Roman Empire).

== Regal period (753 – 509 BC) ==
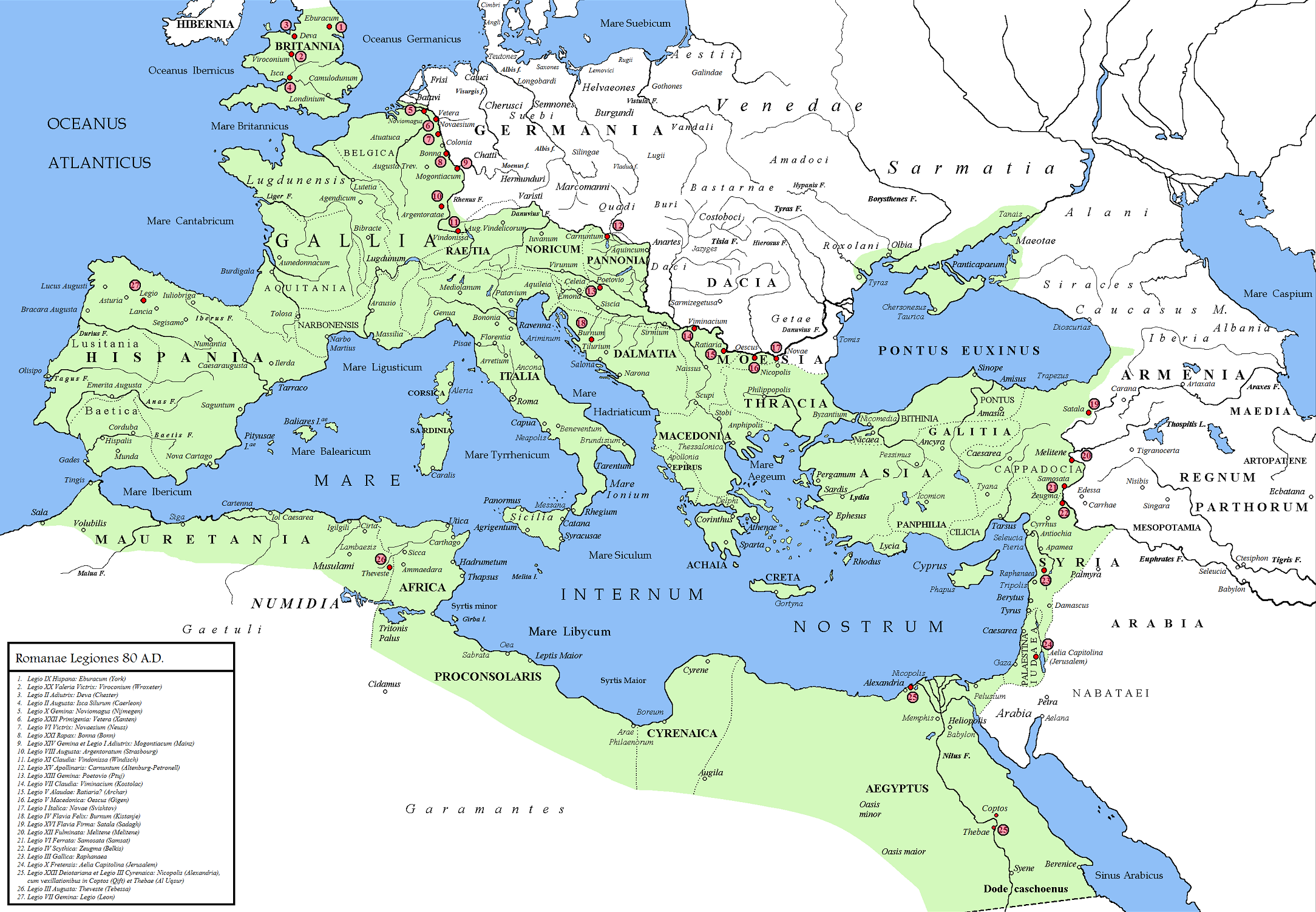
Mondo romano nell'80 d.C. e dislocazione legioni

After the founding of Rome, legend has it that the first king, Romulus established the original Roman legion with 3,000 soldiers and 300 cavalry, which might have been doubled when the city of Rome was expanded by union with the Sabines, coming to a total of 6,000 infantry and 600 cavalry. By the time of Servius Tullius or perhaps the Tarquini the forces had increased once more, bringing the number of infantry to 17,000 and of cavalry to 1,800.

== Republican period (509 – 31 BC) ==
We know from Livy that at the time of the Latin War (340–338 BC) there were normally two armies enlisted, composed of four legions of 4,200–5,000 infantry and 300 cavalry each, for a total armed force of 16,800–20,000 infantry and 1,200 cavalry. with an equal number of allied infantry and three times as many cavalry – i.e. 16,800–20,000 infantry and 3,600 cavalry (called socii).

At the time of the Pyrrhic War, the Roman army in the field consisted of four armies, each of which contained two legions of Roman citizens and two units of allies. Each legion consisted of 4,200–5,000 infantry and 300 cavalry, while the allied units had an equal number of infantry but three times as many cavalry (900 cavalry per unit). The complete total, therefore, sums to around 80,000 infantry and 10,000 cavalry.

Around the middle of the third century BC, the Roman army consisted of an occupation force in Sicily and Tarentum (two legions of 4,200 infantry and 300 cavalry each), two consulary armies (both composed of two reinforced legions of around 5,200 infantry and 300 cavalry each) and about 30,000 allied soldiers (including 2,000 cavalry) in permanent active service, with another 90,000 in reserve, ready to intervene if necessary and made up of 50,000 Etruscans and Sabines (including 4,000 cavalry), 20,000 Umbrians and Sarsinans, 20,000 Veneti and Cenomani. The complete armed forces, therefore, could have reached 150,000 individuals, of which only 30,000 were Romans (6 legions).

During the war against Hannibal, the Roman army came to number 23 legions including Roman citizens and Socii (in 212–211 BC), deployed in Italia, Illyricum, Sicily, Sardinia, Cisalpine Gaul and on the borders of Macedon. These numbered around 115,000 infantry and 13,000 cavalry (extrapolating from the numbers provided by Polybius), plus the small squadron of the Scipiones in Hispania, the fleets in the Ionian Sea (50 ships) and around Sicily (100 ships).

At the death of Julius Caesar there were 37 legions in the whole Roman world, including 6 in Macedonia, 3 in Africa and 10 in the eastern provinces. We must not forget that these troops were extremely mobile, that their hiberna (winter quarters) were still rudimentary and little more than a "marching camp".

At the end of civil war between Mark Antony and Octavian there were around 60 legions, although few were at full strength.

== Imperial period ==
=== High empire (31 BC – AD 284) ===
In the time of Tiberius, according to a study by Le Bohec, the legionary forces may have reached the considerable figure of 125,000 men, divided into 25 legions, and with additional auxiliary forces for a total of 250,000 soldiers (including around 30,000 cavalry). In addition to this there were 10,000 soldiers garrisoned in the capital, including the Praetorian guard, the urban cohorts, vigiles, equites singulares Augusti and 40,000 marines in the navy.

Under Trajan the number of legions was brought to 30 (around 165,000 legionaries), while the number of auxiliaries was increased to 380 units (for a total of around 200,000–220,000 men, including 70,000 cavalry), totalling 360,000–380,000 soldiers.

Holder's 2003 study broadly affirms these figures, finding that the Roman army contained about 380,000 soldiers: 154,000 legionaries and 223,000 auxiliaries (excluding the forces in Rome, the fleets of Ravenna, Misenum, and smaller naval deployments on the Rhine, Danube, Mediterranean coast, Black Sea coast and English Channel):

Roman Army: summary of the distribution by province, around 135 AD
| Province | Modern equivalent | Alae (n.miliarie) | Cohortes (n.miliarie) | Total units | X | Cavalry* | Infantry | Total auxiliaries | X | Num. legions | Legionary infantry | X | Grand total |
|---|---|---|---|---|---|---|---|---|---|---|---|---|---|
| Britannia | England and Wales | 11 (1) | 45 (6) | 56 | | 10.688 | 25.520 | 36.208 | | 3 | 16.500 | | 52.708 |
Rhine frontier
| Germania Inferior | Low Countries | 6 | 17 | 23 | | 4.512 | 8.160 | 12.672 | | 2 | 11.000 | | 23.672 |
| Germania Superior | Alsace | 3 | 22 (1) | 25 | | 3.336 | 10.880 | 14.216 | | 2 | 11.000 | | 25.216 |
Danube frontier
| Rhaetia/Noricum | South Germany; Switzerland/Austria | 7 (1) | 20 (5) | 27 | | 5.280 | 11.220 | 16.500 | | 1 | 5.500 | | 22.000 |
| Pannonia | Hungary west. Slovenia | 11 (2) | 21 (4) | 32 | | 8.304 | 11.360 | 19.664 | | 3 | 16.500 | | 36.164 |
| Moesia Superior | northern Serbia | 2 | 10 | 12 | | 1.864 | 4.800 | 6.664 | | 2 | 11.000 | | 17.664 |
| Moesia Inferior | Bulgaria | 5 | 12 | 17 | | 3.520 | 5.760 | 9.280 | | 1 | 5.500 | | 14.780 |
| Three Daciae | Romania | 11 (1) | 32 (8) | 43 | | 7.328 | 17.920 | 25.248 | | 2 | 11.000 | | 36.248 |
Eastern frontier
| Cappadocia | Turkey | 4 | 15 (2) | 19 | | 3.368 | 7.840 | 11.208 | | 3 | 16.500 | | 27.708 |
| Syria, Judaea, and Arabia | Syria, Palestine, Jordan and Israel | 12 (1) | 43 (3) | 55 | | 10.240 | 21.600 | 31.840 | | 5 | 27.500 | | 59.340 |
North Africa
| Egypt | Egypt | 4 | 11 | 15 | | 3.008 | 5.280 | 8.288 | | 2 | 11.000 | | 19.288 |
| Mauretania and Africa | Tunisia, Algeria and Morocco | 10 (1) | 30 (1) | 40 | | 7.796 | 14.720 | 22.516 | | 1 | 5.500 | | 28.016 |
| Internal provinces | | 2 | 15 | 17 | | 2.224 | 7.200 | 9.424 | | 1 | 5.500 | | 14.924 |
| Great grandtotal | | 88 (7) | 293 (30) | 381 | | 71.468 | 152.260 | 223.728 | | 28 | 154.000 | | 377.728 |

In the time of Emperor Septimius Severus, the Roman army reached around 500,000 total individuals, with 33 legions (182,000 legionaries) and more than 400 auxiliary units (around 250,000 auxiliaries of which around 75,000 served as cavalry). In the course of the Crisis of the third century, the legions reached 36 units – equivalent to 200,000 soldiers – so that more than 500,000 individuals were under arms.

=== Late Roman empire (284–337) ===
With the institution of the Tetrarchy by Diocletian, the total number of legions reached 53–56 in AD 300. The garrison of Rome underwent an important expansion (which may already have occurred during the third century). There were 10 Praetorian cohorts of 1,000 men each and 1,000 equites singulares, for a total of 24,000 men. The fleet in this period is meant to have reached around 45,500 men, according to John Lydus, a bureaucrat who wrote in the time of Justinian.

The accession of Constantine to the throne and the revival of the dynastic monarchy saw the number of Roman legions increased for a final time to 64–67 by the time of his death in 337. The figure might be further augmented if the forces of Barbarian foederati are included as part of the Roman army.

Thus, scholarly estimates of the number of soldiers of the first three centuries of the Roman empire can be summarised as follows:

Roman army 284–337
| Military units | Tiberius 24 | Trajan 107 | Hadrian ca. 135 | Marcus Aurelius 166/7 | Septimius Severus 211 | Aurelian 275 | Diocletian 305 | Constantine I 337 |
|---|---|---|---|---|---|---|---|---|
| Legionaries | 125,000 | 165,000 | 154,000 | 165,000 | 182,000 | 209,000 | 265/280,000 | 320/335,000 |
| Legions | 25 | 30 | 28 | 30 | 33 | 37–38 | 53–56 | 64–67 |
| Auxiliaries | 125,000 | 224,000 | 224.000 | 224,000 | 250.000 | ~250.000 (?) | ~250.000 (?) | ~243/228.000 (?) |
| Praetorian guard and other garrisons of Rome | ~10,000 | ~15,000 | ~15,000 | ~15,000 | ~20,000 | ~20,000 | 24,000 | 18,000 |
| Roman navy | ~40,000 | ~50,000 | ~50,000 | ~50,000 | ~50,000 | ~45,000 | 45,500 | 64,000 |
| Total Roman forces | 300,000 | 454,000 | 443,000 | 454,000 | 502,000 | 524,000 | 584,000–599,500 | 645,000 |

Thanks especially to the Notitia dignitatum (datable to the beginning of the fifth century), some modern authors, such as A. H. M. Jones have proposed a reconstruction of the dimensions of the Roman army in the time of Constantine, using the list of military units present in the eastern and western portions of the empire. Jones's proposal could be summarised thus: 600,000 soldiers total, including 104,000 comitatenses in the west, 113,000 comitatenses in the east, 135,000 limitanei in the west, and 248,000 in the east. This estimate was said to be affirmed by Agathias (On the reign of Justinian, 5.13) who wrote at the time of Justinian that in "earlier times" (which A. H. M. Jones suggests was before 395, most probably in the time of Diocletian and Constantine,), the army had numbered 645,000 soldiers.

The estimate of Agathias and A.H.M. Jones has however been put into doubt by more recent studies which maintain that the figure of Agathias, even if it has some validity, would represent the official, not the actual size of Constantine's army. In fact, the units of the late empire contained fewer soldiers than they officially consisted of. Perhaps even a third of the official figure may have existed only on paper. Therefore, the 645,000 soldiers mentioned by Agathias may have been less than 400,000 in reality. This figure agrees well with the other total figures provided by ancient sources, such as the estimate of 389,704 soldiers given for the army of Diocletian by Agathias' contemporary John Lydus (excluding the navy). The number given by Lydus is considered more credible than that of Agathias by modern scholars because of its precision (the implication being that since it is not a round number it was perhaps found in an official document) and because it is ascribed to a specific point in time.

Jones' estimate of 645,000 soldiers, moreover, is based on assumptions about the number of soldiers in each unit of limitanei which may be too high. Jones calculated the number of soldiers in Egyptian units under Diocletian using evidence found in papyrus records of military pay. However, a recent work by R Duncan-Jones, revising the calculations, has concluded that Jones over-estimated the size of the units by two to six times. For example, Jones had estimated that every legion on the frontier had around 3,000 soldiers, while units elsewhere were composed of 500 men each; according to the revisions of Duncan-Jones, on the other hand, the frontier legions had 500 men per unit as well, an ala only 160 and a unit of equites 80. While admitting the possibility that some of these units were detachments of larger units, it is probable that the actual number of soldiers in all units was a great deal smaller than in preceding periods.

Duncan-Jones' estimates also conform with the results of numerous archaeological excavations along the imperial frontiers which suggest that the fortresses of the Late Empire were designed to accommodate smaller garrisons than those of the principate. Where such sites can be identified with the forts listed in the Notitia dignitatum, the implication is that the resident units were very small indeed. Examples include the Legio II Herculia, created by Diocletian, which occupied a fortress only 1/7 of the size of a typical legionary fort of the Principate, suggesting a unit of around 750 soldiers. At Abusina on the Rhine, the Cohors III Brittonum resided in a fort only a tenth the size of its old fort in the time of Trajan, suggesting that the cohort contained a mere 50 soldiers. This evidence must be used with caution insofar as the identifications of archaeological sites with the locations in the Notitia Dignatorum is often uncertain and also because the units in question could be detachments (The Notitia frequently mentions the same units in two or three different locations at the same time). Even so, the results of the excavations seem to suggest tiny dimensions for the units of the frontiers.

Furthermore, more recent works suggest that the regular army of the second century was considerably larger than the circa 300,000 traditionally assumed, with the auxiliaries containing around 50% more troops than the legions, in contradiction to the beginning of the first century when the legions and auxiliaries were around the same number. The army of the Principate probably reached a peak of around 450,000 soldiers (excluding fleets and foederati) towards the end of the second century. Further the evidence suggests that the actual numbers of the units were typically closer to the official numbers (say 85%) in the second century than in the fourth century. In any case, the estimates for the size of the army in the Principate are based on more certain evidence than the evidence for the late imperial army, which is far less certain.

== Bibliography ==
=== Primary sources ===
- Ammianus Marcellinus, Histories
- Julius Caesar, De bello Gallico.
- John Lydus, De Mensibus, 1.
- Notitia Dignitatum, .
- Plutarch, Life of Romulus.
- Polybius, The Histories, 6.19–42.
- Vegetius, De Re Militari

=== Secondary sources ===
- E.Abranson & J.P. Colbus, La vita dei legionari ai tempi della guerra di Gallia, Milano 1979.
- Giovanni Brizzi, Scipione e Annibale. La guerra per salvare Roma, Bari-Roma, 2007. ISBN 978-88-420-8332-0
- J.M.Carrié, Eserciti e strategie, in vol.XVIII of Storia Einaudi dei Greci e dei Romani, Milano-Torino 2008, pp. 83–154.
- G.Cascarino, L'esercito romano. Armamento e organizzazione, Vol. I – Dalle origini alla fine della repubblica, Rimini 2007.
- G.Cascarino, L'esercito romano. Armamento e organizzazione, Vol. II – Da Augusto ai Severi, Rimini 2008.
- P.Connolly, L'esercito romano, Milano 1976.
- P.Connolly, Greece and Rome at war, London 1998. ISBN 1-85367-303-X
- N.Fields, Roman Auxiliary Cavalryman, Oxford 2006.
- E.Gabba, Esercito e società nella tarda Repubblica romana, Firenze 1973.
- A.K.Goldsworthy, The Roman Army at War, 100 BC-AD 200, Oxford – N.Y 1998.
- A.K.Goldsworthy, Roman Warfare, 2000.
- A.K.Goldsworthy, Complete Roman Army, 2003.
- A.K.Goldsworthy, Storia completa dellesercito romano, Modena 2007. ISBN 978-88-7940-306-1
- J.Rodríguez González, Historia de las legiones Romanas, Madrid 2003.
- M.Hassall, The Army" in Cambridge Ancient History, II ed., Vol.XI (The High Empire 70–192), 2000.
- P.Holder, Auxiliary Deployment in the Reign of Hadrian, 2003.
- A.H.M.Jones, The Later Roman Empire (284–602), vol. I-II, Oklahoma 1986.
- D.Kennedy, L'Oriente, in Il mondo di Roma imperiale. La formazione, edited by J.Wacher, Bari 1989.
- L.Keppie, The Making of the Roman Army, from Republic to Empire, London 1998.
- Y.Le Bohec, L'esercito romano da Augusto alla fine del III secolo, Roma 1992, VII ristampa 2008.
- Y.Le Bohec, Armi e guerrieri di Roma antica. Da Diocleziano alla caduta dell'impero, Roma 2008. ISBN 978-88-430-4677-5
- E.Luttwak, La grande strategia dell'Impero romano, Milano 1991.
- S.Mazzarino, L'impero romano, Bari 1973.
- MacMullen, How Big was the Roman Army?, in KLIO, 1979.
- S.McDowall, Late Roman Infantryman, Oxford 1994.
- A.Milan, Le forze armate nella storia di Roma Antica, Roma 1993.
- H.Parker, The Roman Legions, N.Y. 1958.
- J.Spaul, Cohors 2, 2000.
- Treadgold, Warren T. (1997). A History of the Byzantine State and Society. Stanford University Press. ISBN 0-8047-2630-2.
- A.Watson, Aurelian and the Third Century, London & New York 1999.
- G.Webster, The Roman Imperial Army, London - Oklahoma 1998.
