= Museum of Applied Arts (Budapest) =

Museum in Budapest, Hungary

- Iparművészeti Múzeum
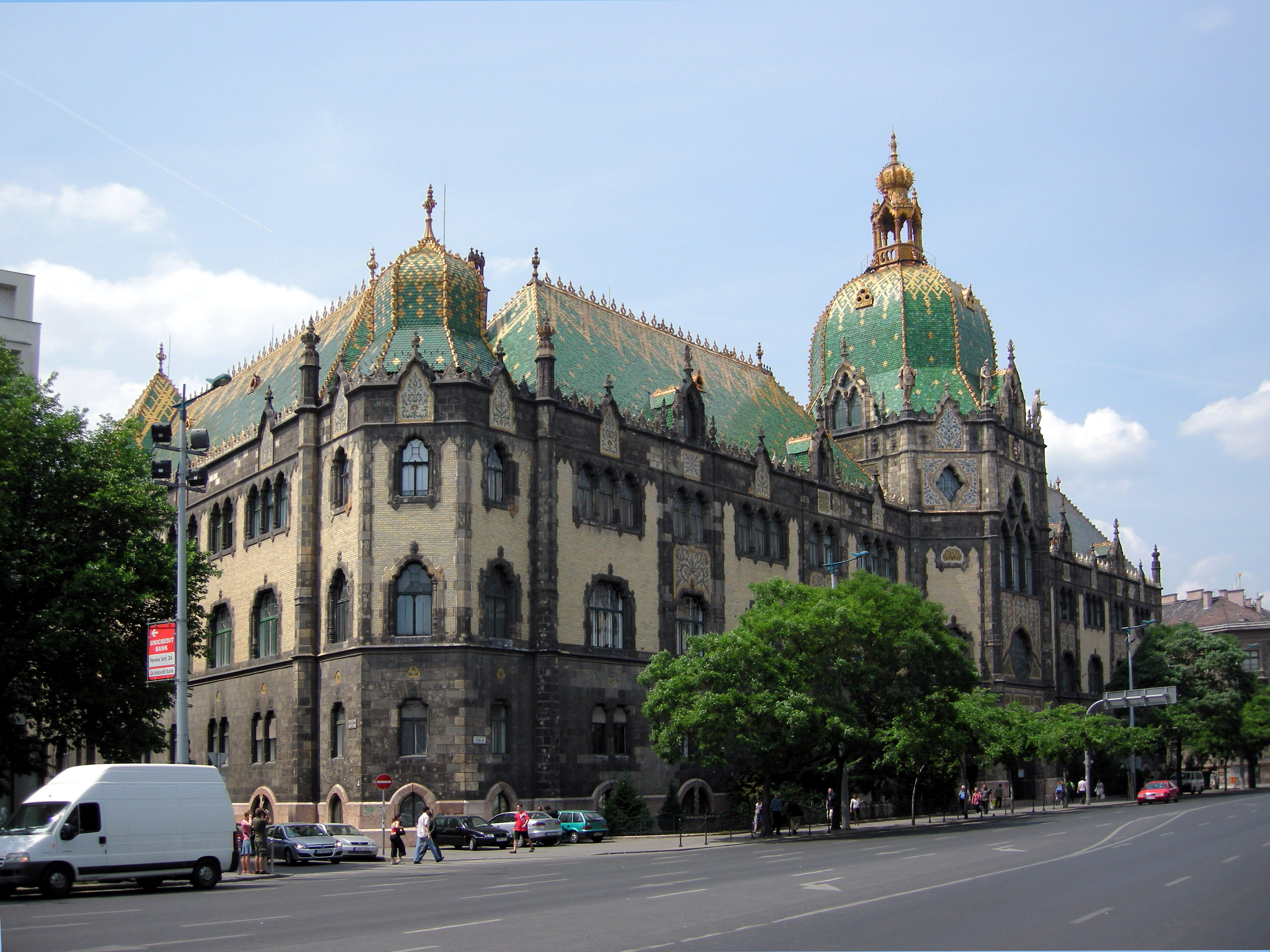
- Interactive fullscreen map
- Location: Budapest, Hungary
- Coordinates: 47°29′10″N 19°04′06″E

The Museum of Applied Arts (Hungarian: Iparművészeti Múzeum, pronounced [ˈipɒrmyːveːsɛti ˈmuːzɛum]) is a museum in Budapest, Hungary. It is the third-oldest applied arts museum in the world. It was established by the Hungarian Parliament in 1872 to collect applied artworks, historical and contemporary, from Hungary and around the world.

== Architecture ==
The museum was built between 1893 and 1896 and was designed by Ödön Lechner and Gyula Pártos in the Hungarian Secession style, a type of Art Nouveau. The building was opened on 25 October 1896 as the closing event of Hungary's millennium celebrations. It has a green roof and the interior is designed using Hindu, Mogul, and Islamic designs. It is considered a masterpiece of the Art Nouveau style in Hungary.

The Hungarian Royal School of Applied Arts moved from its scattered locations around the city into the new building with the Museum in 1896. The following year a joint library shared by the Museum of and the school opened in the same building.

By the 21st century extensive renovations for the building became necessary, and a design competition was announced in 2012 for plans to reconstruct and reconfigure the building. A construction tender was issued in 2021, and the renovated museum was due to reopen in spring 2026, but this did not happen. The building has been closed since 2017, and since then it has been open to visitors only on rare occasions, such as the Opus 735 exhibition in 2022. By 2026 its condition had deteriorated, with crumbling plaster, leaking walls and pyrogranite tiles fallen from the facade.

== Collection ==
The foundation of the museum's historical collections was formed by a transfer of artwork from the Hungarian National Museum. Further collections were built up in the Museum's early days from purchases made at world's fairs and donations from companies. The founding goal of the Museum was to create a collection that would bolster the development of Hungarian craft industries and raise the standards of public taste.

The museum houses a collection of metalwork, furniture, textiles, and glass. It also has a library. Nearly 42,000 works from the collection can be browsed in the museum's online database. There are two other locations: the Hopp Ferenc Museum of Eastern Asiatic Arts and Nagytétény Palace.

The museum is located near the southern end of the Grand Boulevard in the neighborhood Ferencváros and it can be accessed by metro line 3.

== Gallery ==
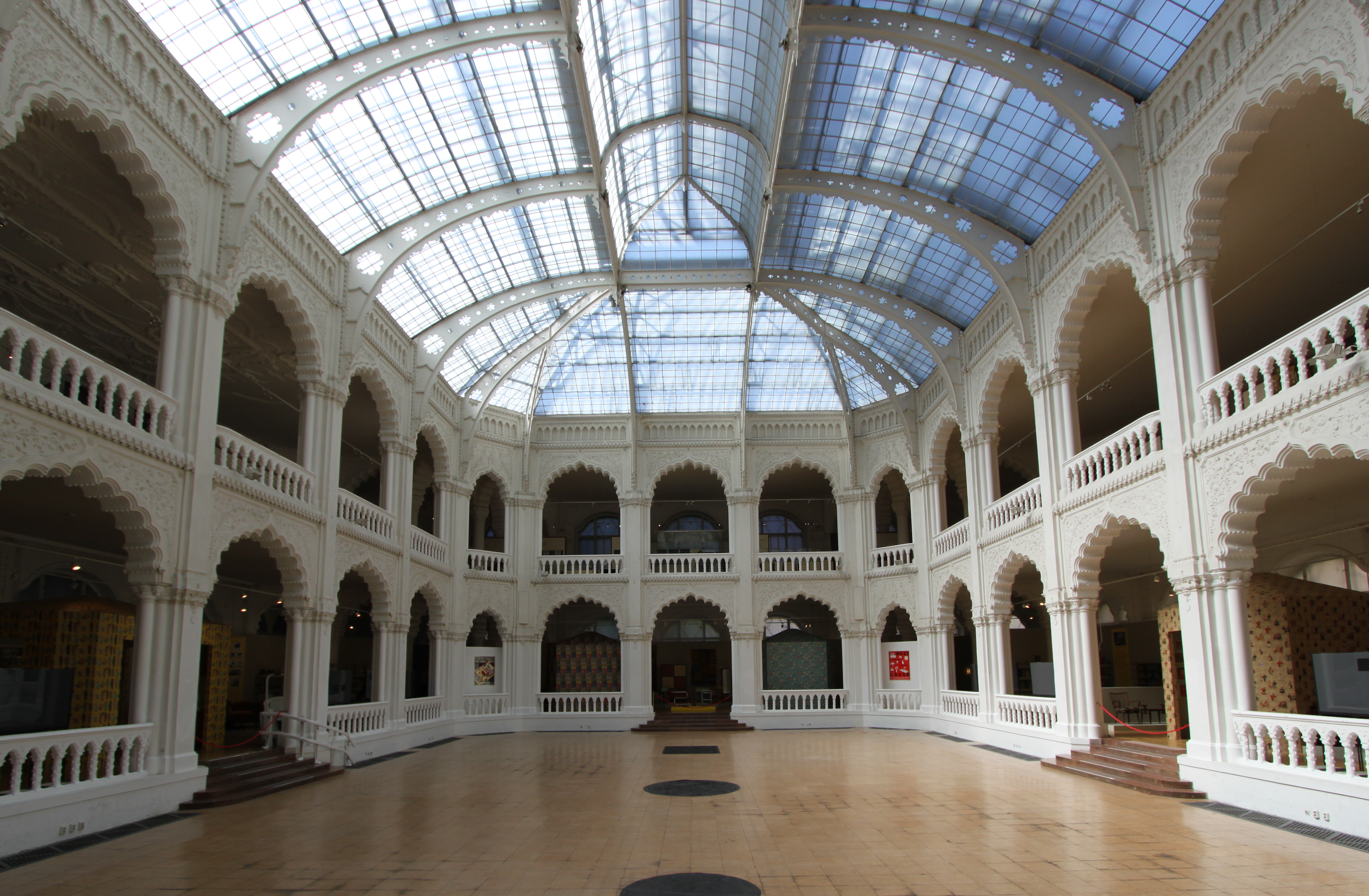
The atrium

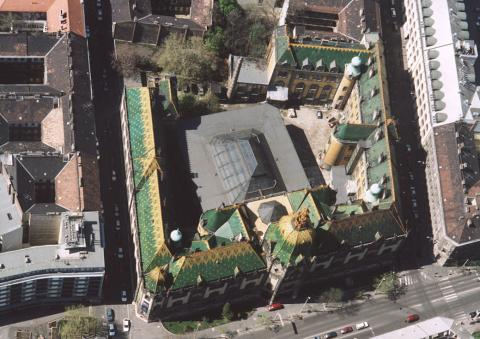
Aerial view of the museum

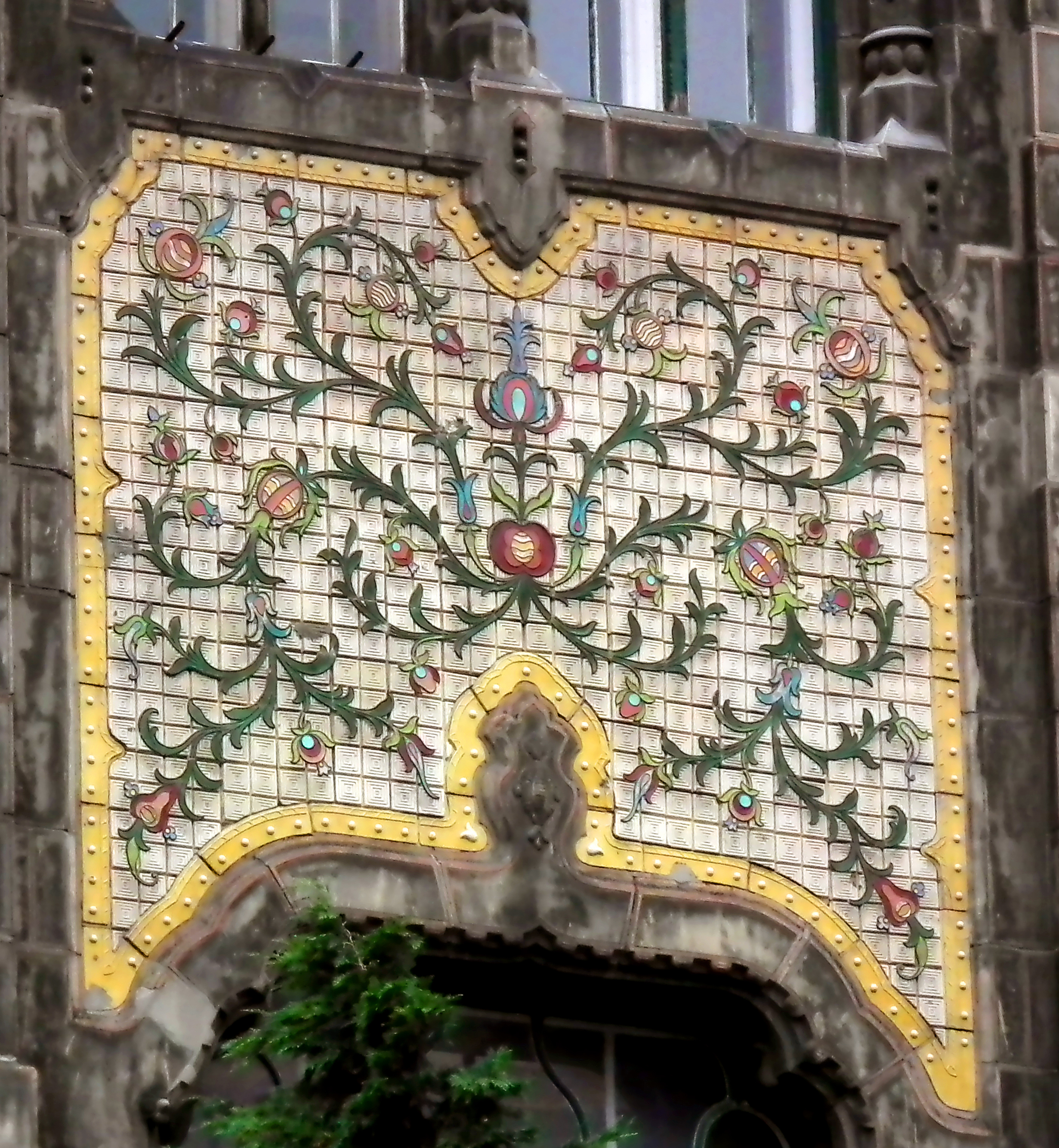
Facade detail

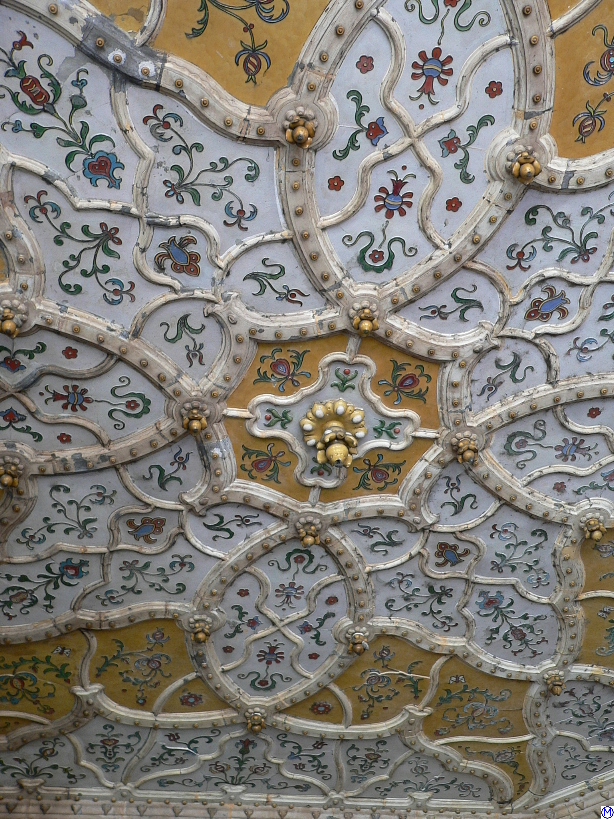
Ceiling detail

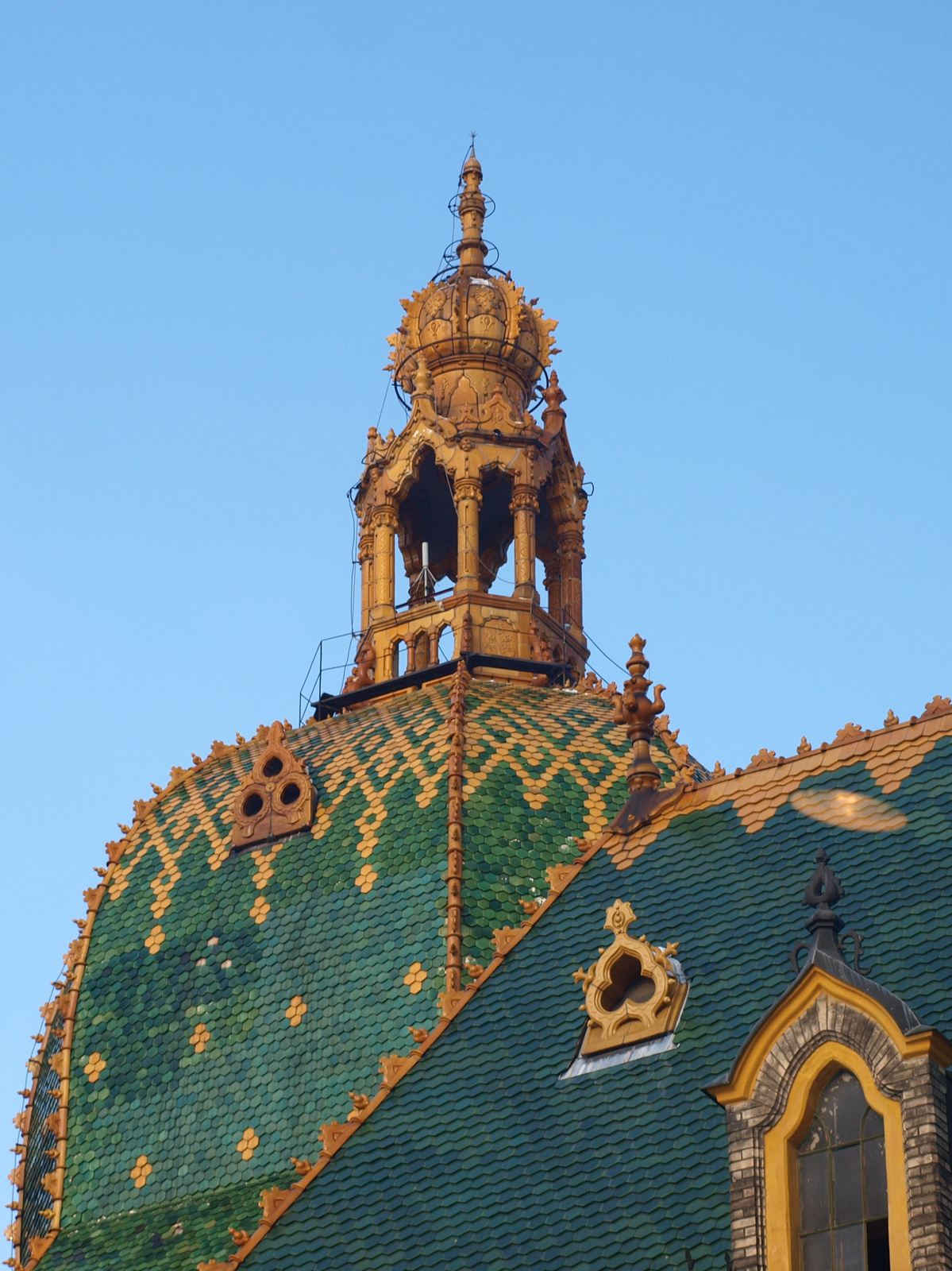
Roof detail

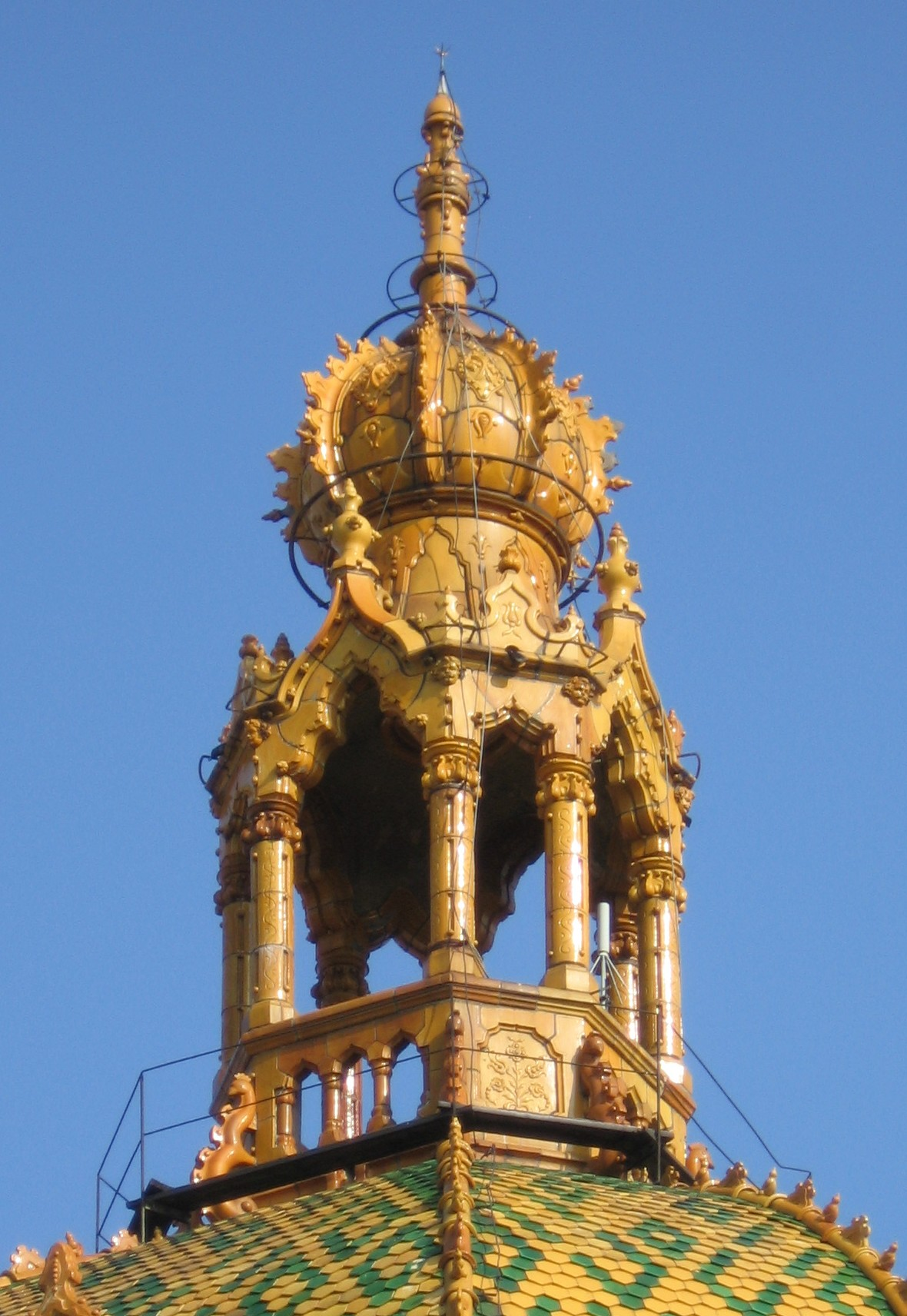
Lantern, Museum of Applied Arts, Budapest

== See also ==
- List of design museums
