= Alica =

Thervingian Gothic king

Alica was a Thervingian Gothic warrior. He was an ally of Licinius against Constantine the Great, who in 323 had invaded Gothic territory and killed the warrior Rausimod. Alica supported Licinius in his battles with Constantine in 324. After Licinius had been defeated and deposed by Constantine, he tried to regain power with Gothic help, but his plans were exposed and he was sentenced to death. Licinius then tried to escape into Gothic territory, but was apprehended at Thessaloniki and executed.

== Sources ==
- Wolfram, Herwig (1990). History of the Goths. University of California Press. ISBN 0520069838.
