= Nagytétény Palace =

Museum in Budapest, Hungary

Coordinates: 47°23′27″N 18°59′14″E

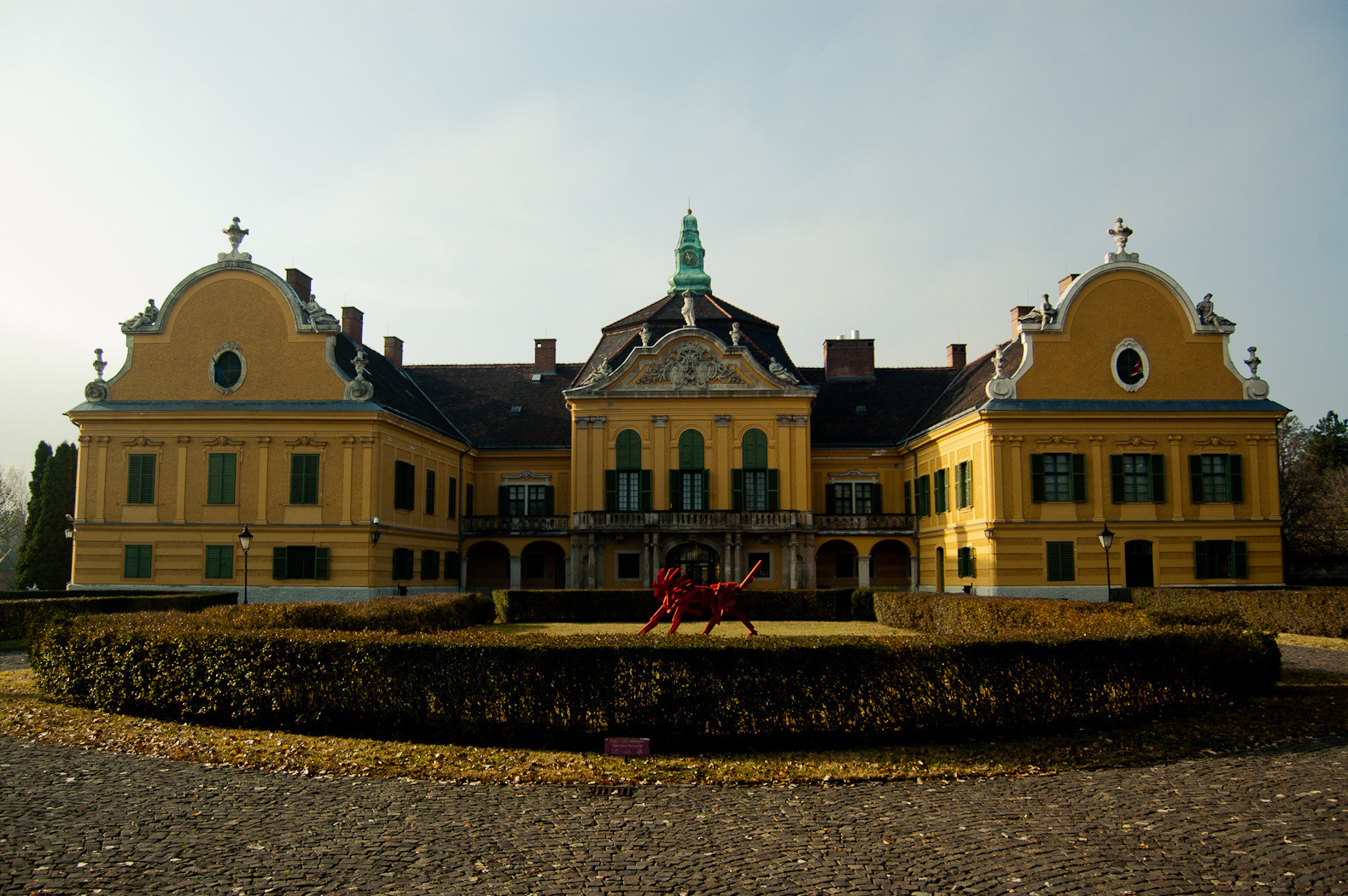
Nagytétény Palace (2007)

Nagytétény Palace or Száraz-Rudnyánszky Palace is today the furniture museum of the Museum of Applied Arts in Budapest established in 1949. It is located at 9-11 Kastélypark Street in the 22nd District of Budapest.

== History of the building ==
One of the finest monuments of Baroque architecture in Hungary, the former Száraz-Rudnyánszky Palace was designed by András Mayerhoffer and built by Baron József Rudnyánszky (spouse: Julianna Száraz) between 1743 and 1751 on the place of a Roman villa rustica and using an earlier palace that stood here. The Száraz-Rudnyánszky Palace was built in the so-called Grassalkovich Style. The original Gothic palace was built in the 13th century for the Tétény family that was related to the Árpád Dynasty

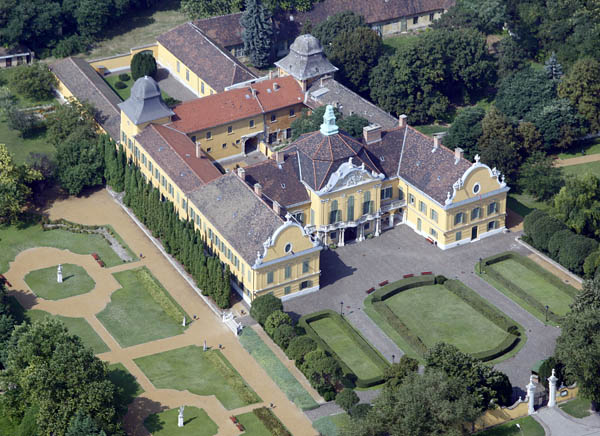
The palace from a bird's eye view

During the one hundred fifty years of Ottoman Occupation (1541-1686), the Nagytétény Palace was the home of high-ranking Ottoman officers. In 1686 captain Ferenc Buchingen received the palace in honour of his merits in the war against the Turks. Later the mortgaged property was redeemed by György Száraz. Baron György Száraz moved in the palace in 1716 and started to reconstruct and expand the building.

After the death of Julianna Száraz-Rudnyánszky (1798), the palace was divided into three parts for the heirs. In 1904, the palace burnt down, nothing remained from its interior furniture. During World War II, the building was badly damaged. The Ministry of Agriculture transferred the palace for museum purposes in 1948. Its reconstruction started in 1951, and the first furniture exhibition opened in the same year. In 1989 - due to the deterioration of the building - the palace had to be closed down. After the restoration works started in 1997, the Palace Museum opened again for the public in 2000.

The terrace of the palace originally reached to the Danube bank but later it was divided by the railway line and a main road.

== The exhibition ==
The applied arts exhibition presents artifacts of Hungarian and foreign furniture-making in a historical context with contemporary carpets, stoves and ceramics. About 300 items are presented in more than two dozen rooms.
