= Rausimod =

Rausimod (?–322) was a Sarmatian or Maeotian warrior king. In 322, Rausimod is recorded as having crossed the Danube into the Roman Empire and attacked the territory of Licinius. The defence against Rausimod was conducted by Constantine, who on April 28, 323 passed a law threatening all Roman collaborators with death by burning. Constantine pursued the invaders across the Danube into barbarian territory, where Rausimod was killed. Constantine's campaign was considered a trespassing of the territory of Licinius, and the Goths thereafter became allies of Licinius against Constantine under their prince Alica. He is perhaps identifiable with the Bosporan king Rhadamsades.

== Sources ==
- Astakhov, Ivan Alekseevich (2020). "NOMADIC IMPACT ON THE LATE ANTIQUE BOSPORAN STRATEGY". Revista Inclusiones: 75–83.
- Wolfram, Herwig (1990). History of the Goths. University of California Press. ISBN 0520069838.
