= Santo Mazzarino =

Italian historian

Santo Mazzarino (27 January 1916 – 18 May 1987) was an Italian historian considered to be a leading 20th-century historian of ancient Rome. He was a member of the Accademia dei Lincei.

Mazzarino was born in Catania. As a scholar and faculty member of the University of Catania and University of Rome La Sapienza, Mazzarino was viewed as one of Italy's leading historians. His influential book La fine del mondo antico (1959) examined the death of Rome as a result of decadence. The book was widely read among non-specialists as well and has been translated into several languages. Mazzarino's primary historical contributions covered subjects such as the 4th-century economy, classical historiography, and various aspects of the Roman Empire. As a Marxist, he blamed the same decadence for the woes of the modern world.

As of 2007, his main and fundamental works are being newly issued by Bollati Boringhieri, a renowned Italian scientific publisher in Turin.

== Bibliography ==
- Stilicone: La Crisi Imperiale dopo Teodosio (1942)
- Dalla monarchia allo Stato repubblicano. Ricerche di storia romana arcaica (1945)
- Fra Oriente e Occidente. Ricerche di storia greca arcaica (1947)
- Aspetti sociali del IV secolo: ricerche di storia tardo-romana. L'Erma di Bretschneider, Roma, (1951)
- L'impero romano (1956)
- Introduzione alle guerre puniche (2003)
- La fine del mondo antico. Le cause della caduta dell'impero romano (1959; English translation by George Holmes as The end of the ancient world)
- Il pensiero storico classico (3 voll., 1965–66)
- Il basso impero. Antico, tardoantico ed era costantiniana (2 volumes, 1974-1980)
- Storia sociale del Vescovo Ambrogio (1989)
- Trattato di storia romana (1962, with Giulio Giannelli)
- Vico, l'annalistica e il diritto (1971)
- Storia romana e storiografia moderna (1954)
- Serena e le due Eudossie (1946)
