= History of the later Roman Empire =

The history of the Later Roman Empire covers the history of the Roman Empire from the beginning of the rule of Diocletian in 284 AD (1037 AVC) and the establishment of the Tetrarchy in 293 AD by Diocletian to the death of Heraclius in 641 AD (1394 AVC).

== Background ==
The Roman Empire underwent a critical period of crisis after Emperor Severus Alexander was murdered in 235 AD. During the following fifty years, twenty emperors ruled, and most of them were assassinated by their own troops. In case of emergency, local officials and military commanders took full control of state administration in large regions. Examples include the Gallic Empire along the Limes Germanicus, and Queen Zenobia's Palmyrene Empire in Syria. In the east, the Persian Sasanians who replaced the Parthian Arsacids adopted an offensive policy against Rome. With the emergence of the Sasanian Empire, Rome ceased to be the sole great power in the Near East. In the west, larger tribal confederation took the place of small Germanic tribes. Among the new tribal federation, the Franks lived along the Lower Rhine, the Alemanni on the Upper Rhine, and the Goths near the Lower Danube. The Roman Empire survived the crisis with minimal territorial losses: only Dacia to the north of the Lower Danube, and the Agri Decumates in the Black Forest region were abandoned in the 270s. Egypt and north Africa, the economically most valuable regions, were far away from the principal theatres of war, and remained almost unharmed.

The army quickly grew in size and the soldiers were no more kept away from the central territories in the 3rd century. The continued payment of soldiery could be secured only by the regular debasement of the Roman silver coins, the denarii. As soon as the population realized that the face value of the denarii in circulation was much higher than their silver content, inflation became uncontrollable. Old coins that contained silver or gold were quickly withdrawn from circulation and treasured. The unmanageable inflation increased the significance of taxation in kind. Regular demands for the annona militaris—the compulsory grain supply to the army—and the angareia—the mandatory military transport—put an enormous strain on the population of the highly militarized regions. The eastern cities, like Antioch and Athens, could quickly recover invasions by enemy forces, but the towns in the less prosperous western provinces were declining.

The Christians' reluctance to make sacrifices was unacceptable for most Romans. Classical authors like Tacitus and Pliny the Younger describe the Christians as opponents of traditional Roman values. Although the Christians were outlawed, they were only sporadically persecuted, and mainly fanatical extremists, especially the Phrygian Montanists were sentenced to death. Significant Christian communities existed in the largest urban centers, like Rome, Antioch, Alexandria and Carthage, and their size quickly grew in the first half of the 3rd century. Convinced that religious laxity threatened national security, Emperor Decius ordered that all citizens were to sacrifice to the gods in 249. During the ensuing persecution, great numbers of non-compliant Christians were executed or forced into exile. Decius died fighting the Goths in 251, but five years later Valerian resumed the persecution which lasted until he was captured by Sassanian troops in the Battle of Edessa in 260. Emperor Carus embarked on a new invasion of the Sassanian Empire, but a bolt of lightning struck him to death in the Persian capital, Ctesiphon in July 283. His younger son Numerian abandoned the campaign, but he died while wintering in the eastern provinces.

== Tetrarchy ==
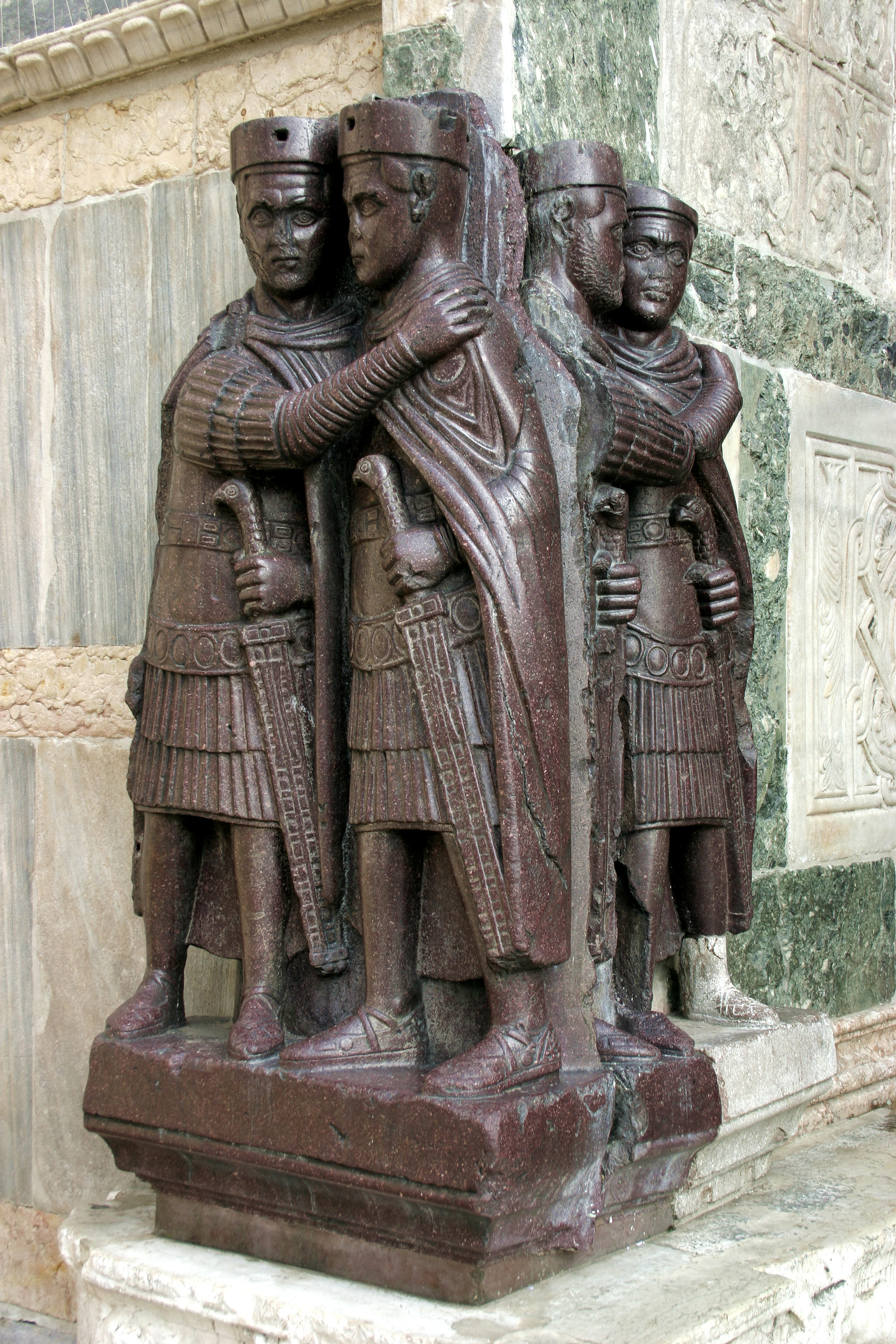
Portrait of the Four Tetrarchs (St Mark's Basilica, Venice)

On learning of the death of Carus and Numerian, senior officers staying in Nicomedia proclaimed one of their number, the Illyrian Diocletian, emperor on 20 November 284. Diocletian marched to Illyricum to fight Carus' elder son, Carinus, but Carinus was assassinated by one of his own retainers in the Battle of the Margus. Diocletian, who had no son, made a Pannonian officer Maximian his co-ruler, first as Caesar in 285, then as junior Augustus in 286. The power-sharing agreement proved durable, with Diocletian mostly ruling in the East, and Maximian in the West. The diarchy developed into a tetrarchy—the rule of four co-emperors—when Diocletian appointed two officers from Illyricum, Constantius Chlorus and Galerius, as Caesars in 293. The relationship between the four emperors was reinforced through marriage alliances: Galerius married Diocletian's daughter Galeria Valeria, and Constantius wed Maximian's daughter Theodora.

Secessionist movements continued. A mutinous military commander Carausius held sway over Britain and northern Gaul from 286 until Constantius overcame him in 293. Domitius Domitianus ruled Egypt until Diocletian captured Alexandria in 297. The tetrarchs launched military campaigns along the borderlands and restored its strategic control. Galerius forced the Persian king, Narseh to cede lands along the river Tigris to Rome and reimposed Roman suzerainty over the Kingdom of Iberia. Diocletian and Galerius waged wars against the Goths, Carpi, Sarmatians, Quadi and Marcomanni along the Danube. Maximian and Constantius defeated the Franks on the Rhine. Maximian went on war against the Quinquegentiani ("Five Peoples") in Mauretania. The four co-rulers' cooperation and military achievements created a period of stability, allowing the introduction of profound administrative and financial reforms. Examples include the reorganization of the provinces and the development of a sophisticated tax system. Diocletian became convinced that the empire's integrity could only be reinforced through the renewal of the traditional religion and outlawed Christianity in 303. During the subsequent Great Persecution, many Christians suffered martyrdom.

The first tetrarchy

Diocletian * c. 243 †311 (r. 284–305)	Prisca
Galeria Valeria	Galerius *c. 260 †311 (r. 293–311)
Valeria Maximilla

Eutropia	Maximian * c. 250 †310 (r. 285–305)
Maxentius c. 283 †312	Theodora (Note: Theodora may have been Maximian's stepdaughter by Eutropia.)

Unknown wife (?)
Constantius Chlorus * c. 250 †306 (r. 293–306)

The first tetrarchy ended with an unprecedented act, the voluntary retirement of Diocletian and Maximian on 1 May 305. On this occasion, Galerius and Constantius Chlorus were promoted to the rank of Augustus, and two Illyrian military commanders, Maximinus Daia and Valerius Severus, were appointed as the new Caesars. Their appointment apparently demonstrates Galerius' influence on the ailing Diocletian: Maximinus Daia was his nephew and Valerius Severus was his friend. Although both Constantius' son, Constantine, and Maximian's son, Maxentius, were adults, the composition of the new tetrarchy ignored their claims to succeed their fathers. When Constantius Chlorus died in Britain on 25 July 306, his troops proclaimed Constantine his successor. Three months later, Maxentius took control of southern and central Italy and Africa. Valerius Severus attacked Maxentius, but his troops who had served under Maximian mutinied and captured him. After seizing northern Italy, Maxentius persuaded his father to abandon his retirement and again rule as Augustus in spring 307. Constantine married Maximian's daughter Fausta, and his new father-in-law appointed him as Augustus. After a conflict between Maximian and Maxentius, Maximian sought refuge at Constantine, and the governor of Africa, Domitius Alexander assumed the imperial title.

To tackle the chaotic situation Galerius convinced Diocletian to preside over a conference at Carnuntum in November 308. The conference established a new tetrarchy, with Galerius and his Dacian protégé, Licinius as Augusti, and Maximinus Daia and Constantine as Caesares. Neither Maximinus nor Constantine acquiesced in their degradation, and both Maxentius and Domitius Alexander insisted on their imperial status. Maxentius sent an expeditionary force against Domitius Alexander and reconquered Africa, while Maximian staged a coup against Constantine. The coup failed and Maximian was forced to commit suicide in summer 310. After Galerius, the last surviving ruler of the first tetrarchy, died in May 311, Constantine made an alliance with Licinius against Maxentius and Maximinus Daia. Maxentius died fighting Constantine in the Battle of the Milvian Bridge on 28 October 312, and Licinius routed Maximinus Daia in Thrace on 30 April 313.

The second and third tetrarchies

Maximian * c. 250 †310 (r. 285–305)
Unknown parent	Theodora (Note: Theodora may have been Maximian's stepdaughter.)	Constantius Chlorus * c. 250 †306 (r. 293–306)	Helena †327
Unknown sister	Galeria Valeria	Galerius *c. 260 †311 (r. 293–311)	Valerius Severus †307 (r. 305–307)	Licinius * c. 266 †325 (r. 308–324)	Constantia	Constantine I * c. 273 †337 (r. 306–337)	Fausta *c. 290 †326
Maximinus Daia * c. 270 †313 (r. 305–313)	Valeria Maximilla	Maxentius c. 283 †312

== Towards Christianization ==
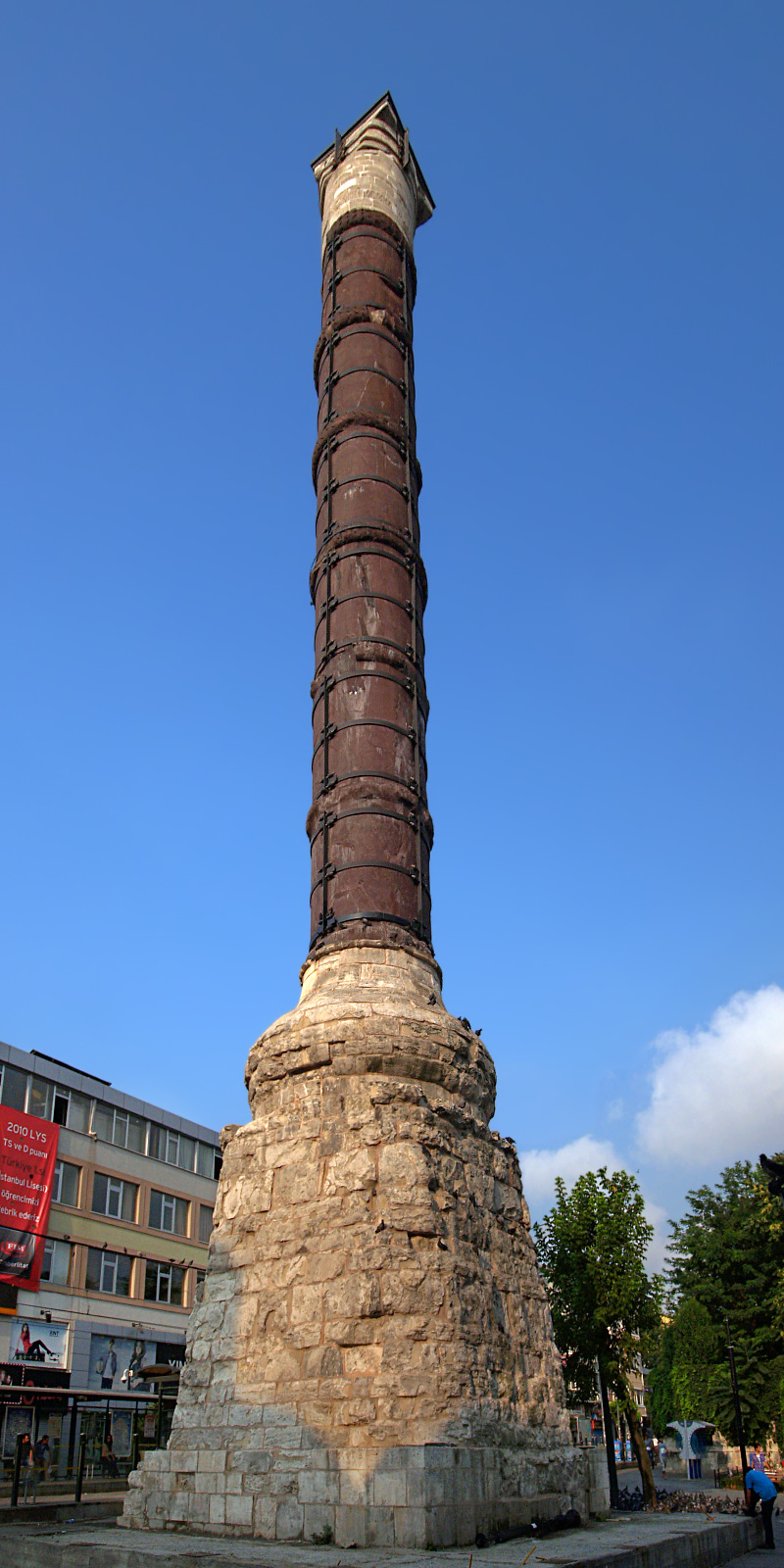
Column of Constantine commemorating the establishment of Constantinople as the Roman Empire's new capital (Istanbul, Turkey)

Licinius had not yet won his war against Maximinus Daia when he married Constantine's half-sister Constantia in Milan in February 313. The two emperors jointly issued a law about religious tolerance, now known as the Edict of Milan. No more excluded from imperial service, Christians could have brilliant careers, like Ablabius, a Greek of humble origin, who held the highest offices between 324 and 331. Relationship between the two emperors grew tense and Constantine seized the Dioceses of Pannonia and Moesia by force in 318. Six years later Constantine launched a new attack against Licinius and forced him to abdicate. In a year, Licinius and his about ten-year-old son by Constantia, also called Licinius, were executed. The tragic child had been appointed as Caesar along with Constantine's two eldest sons, Crispus and Constantine II in 317. Crispus' mother Minervina was Constantine's first wife, while the younger Constantine was born to Fausta. In 326, Crispus and Fausta were executed on mysterious charges, likely because of their adulterous relationship. Always hostile to the first Christian emperor, Zosimus alludes that Constantine's actual conversion to Christianity was the consequence of their execution, because only Christianity offered him absolution for his sin. Constantine made his younger sons by Fausta, Constantius II and Constans, and his nephew Dalmatius Caesars, and appointed Dalmatius' brother Hannibalianus ruler of the Pontic regions.

Constantine continued Diocletian's administrative and financial reforms, but Christian ethics had an impact on his legislation. He banned gladiator games and promoted the less violent chariot racing. He forbade the branding of slaves on the forehead, abolished penalties for celibacy, and offered financial support to poor parents to discourage infanticide. On the other hand, he prescribed that a slave nurse participating in a girl's abduction be punished with molten lead poured down her throat, and a woman who abandoned her husband was to be banished pennilessly to a remote island. Constantine established a new city at a highly defensible place on the site of the ancient Greek polis of Byzantium on the Bosporus in 324. In four years, his "New Rome" was surrounded by walls enclosing about 600 hectares (1,500 acres) of land, and it was adorned with all elements of an imperial capital, including a palace and a large stadium. The city was consecrated as Constantinople on 11 May 330. Constantine launched successful campaigns against the Goths in 332 and 336, and against the Sarmatians in 334. The new Persian king Shapur II invaded Armenia and expelled the Roman client king Tigran VII. Constantine decided to launch a counter-attack, but he died unexpectedly on 22 May 337. His stepbrothers and their sons were soon massacred likely on Constantius II's initiative. Only two children Gallus and Julian survived the purge.

Constantine II, Constantius II, and Constans met in Pannonia in September 337. They assumed the title of Augustus and divided the empire, with Constantine ruling the western, Constans the central and Constantius the eastern regions. Constantius restored Roman protectorate over Armenia and secured the Roman control of the eastern borderlands through a series of military campaigns against Persia. In 340, Constantine attacked Constans reportedly to avenge a slight, but died fighting at Aquileia. Constans seized his territory, but he could not gain the support of the army. A military commander of Germanic origin, Magnentius staged a coup against him in Gaul, and Constans was murdered by his own troops in early 350. In Illyricum, an other high-ranking officer Vetranio assumed the imperial title allegedly with the support of Constans' sister Constantina. Constantius could deal with the usurpers after defeating the Persians at Nisibis. He forced Vetranio to surrender and married off Constantina to their cousin, Gallus, whom he made Caesar with responsibility for the eastern borderland. Constantius inflicted three major defeats on Magnentius who committed suicide in 352. Gallus proved himself incompetent to rule: he crushed a Jewish revolt with excessive cruelty and ordered the execution of citizens on false charges. He was imprisoned and executed on Constantius' order in 354. Constantius made Gallus' younger half-brother Julian Caesar charging him with the command of Gaul and returned to Mesopotamia to repel a Persian invasion. He ordered Julian to send Gallic troops to the east, but they rioted and proclaimed Julian Augustus. Constantius departed for the west to fight Julian, but he died unexpectedly in Cilicia in November 361. To avoid a civil war, Constantius' troops acknowledged Julian as his sole successor.

Julian had received a Christian education, but he was captivated by Neoplatonic mysticism in his youth. During the reign of Constantius II, he had to conceal his pagan sympathies, but as emperor he could openly adhere to paganism. He declared the restoration of religious tolerance as his principal object, but he prohibited Christians from teaching rhetoric and grammar. He wanted to justify his conversion to paganism by a splendid victory, but his invasion of Persia failed. While his army was retreating from Mesopotamia, he was killed in a skirmish on 26 June 363. After a high-ranking pagan official Salutius refused the imperial title, a Christian military commander, Jovian was proclaimed emperor. He abandoned Roman territories in Mesopotamia and acknowledged Persian protectorate over Armenia in return for a thirty-year peace treaty with Shapur II. He died unexpectedly in February 364.

Emperors of the Constantinian dynasty

Helena †327	Constantius Chlorus * c. 250 †306 (r. 293–306)	Theodora
Minervina † before 307	Constantine I * c. 273 †337 (r. 306–337)	Fausta *c. 290 †326	Flavius Dalmatius †337	Julius Constantius †337	Basilina	Constantia	Licinius * c. 266 †325 (r. 308–324)
Dalmatius †337 (r. 335–337)	Hannibalianus †337	Licinius II * c. 315 †325 (r. 317–324)
Crispus * c. 300 †326 (r. 317–326)	Constantine II; *316 †340 (r. 317–340)	Constantius II; *317 †361 (r. 337–361)	Constans * c. 323 †350 (r. 337–350)	Constantina †354	Gallus * c. 325 †354 (r. 351–354)	Helena †360	Julian * c. 331 †363 (r. 361–363)

== Defeats and reconstruction ==
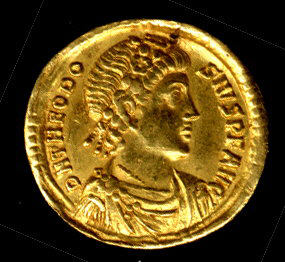
Gold solidus of Theodosius I, the last emperor to rule a united Roman Empire

The commanders of Jovian's army discussed his succession with civil officials at Nicaea. On 26 February 364, they elected a Pannonian tribune Valentinian I emperor, and about a month later, Valentinian appointed his younger brother Valens his co-ruler. They divided the empire with Valentinian ruling in the West, and Valens in the East. After a severe illness, Valentinian made his son Gratian the third co-emperor. Although Picts, Scoti, Attacotti, Alemanni, Saxons, Quadi, Sarmatians and Goths launched regular raids across the imperial borders, the Roman army pacified the situation. In the east, Valens had to face a rebellion by Julian's relative Procopius, but he quickly crushed it in Lydia in 366. After launching two invasions across the Lower Danube, Valens forced the Goths to renounce their claim to a yearly contribution from Rome. When Valentinian I died in November 375, leaders of his army proclaimed his four-year-old son Valentinian II emperor. Gratian acknowledged his half-brother's promotion, but in practice he ruled the western part of the empire alone.

From the 350s, the nomadic Huns were invading the Pontic steppes from the east, and the natives could not long resist them. In the summer of 376, thousands of Goths fleeing from the Huns gathered along the northern bank of the Lower Danube to seek asylum in the Roman Empire. Regarding them as potential recruits, Valens allowed them to settle in Thrace, but failure to provide ample amounts of food, and abuses by Roman officials outraged the Goths. Further waves of asylum seekers crossed the river and the Goths rose up in rebellion. Valens had concentrated his troops in Antioch in preparation for a military campaign against Persia, and the Roman troops left behind in the Balkans could not crush the rebellion. Valens sought military assistance from Gratian, while the Goths hired Huns and Alans to invade Roman territory. Without waiting for the arrival of reinforcements from the west, Valens engaged the Goths in person at Adrianople on 9 August 378. The East Roman army was nearly annihilated and Valens died in the battlefield. Gratian appointed a talented general Theodosius to deal with deteriorating situations in the Balkans, and awarded him with the title Augustus early in 379. Theodosius recruited new troops, but he was unable to defeat the rebels. The conflict ended with a compromise in 382, unprecedented and humiliating to the Romans: the Goths were allowed to settle in groups in Thrace and Pannonia as foederati, or allies, but they were not subjected to Roman officials' rule. Theodosius appointed his elder son Arcadius co-emperor.

Gratian's alleged favoritism towards his Alan mercenaries outraged the Roman troops in Britain and they proclaimed their commander Magnus Maximus emperor in 383. Gratian was assassinated by his own guards in August, and Maximus took control of the western provinces to the north of the Alps. He invaded Italy and forced the young Valentinian II and his family to seek refuge in Thessaloniki in 387. After marrying Valentinian II's sister Galla, Theodosius launched a surprise attack against Maximus. Unable to resist, Maximus was captured and executed at Aquileia. In 388, Valentinian returned to the West, but Theodosius appointed a Frankish military commander Arbogast as the young emperor's guardian. In the east, Theodosius and the Sassanian king Shapur III divided Armenia to avoid a new war. Western Armenia was incorporated into the Roman Empire, but the new provinces were ruled by local Armenian hereditary governors. Arbogast openly disobeyed Valentinian's orders and the young emperor committed suicide in 392. With Arbogast's support, a Roman pagan aristocrat, Eugenius was proclaimed emperor. Theodosius elevated his younger son Honorius to the status of Augustus before departing for a military campaign against Eugenius. He inflicted a decisive defeat on the usurper in the Battle of the Frigidus on 6 September 394. He re-unified the Roman Empire, but he died on 17 January 395.

Emperors of the Valentinianic dynasty

Gratianus Funarius
Marina Severa	Valentinian I *321 †375 (r. 364–375)	Justina	Valens * c. 328 †378 (r. 364–378)	Albia Dominica
Gratian; *359 †383 (r. 367–383)	Valentinian II; *371 †392 (r. 375–392)	Galla	Theodosius I *347 †395 (r. 379–395)

== Divided empire ==
The Roman Empire after its division in 395

Theodosius I was succeeded by the eighteen-year-old Arcadius in the East, and the ten-year-old Honorius in the West. The notion of imperial unity persisted, although divergences between the two realms deepened. A Western Roman general of half-Vandal origin Stilicho announced that the dying Theodosius had appointed him the guardian of both emperors, but his claim to rule the Eastern Roman Empire was challenged by the praetorian prefect Rufinus. Taking advantage of their conflict, Alaric I the leader of a group of Goths who became known as Visigoths established a new power centre in the Balkans. Attacking the empire from the east, the Huns pillaged Syria and Cappadocia. Rufinus' opponents blamed him for the calamities and a Gothic commander in Roman service, Gainas murdered him in November 395. During the ensuing power struggle, the eunuch Eutropius assumed power with Arcadius' consent. In 397, Stilicho invaded Achaea allegedly to attack Alaric, but Eutropius was worried about Stilicho's ambitions. On his advice, Arcadius declared Stilicho a public enemy, forcing him to return to the west. Eutropius was unpopular and the Gothic troops' riot in Phrygia provided an excuse for Gainas to achieve his deposition in 399. Gainas took control of state administration, but an anti-Gothic riot in Constantinople enabled Arcadius to remove him with the support of an other Gothic general Fravitta.

The empire faced new waves of mass migrations likely triggered by the Huns' westward expansion. Around 405, a mixed group of peoples invaded Italy under the command of a Gothic chieftain Radagaisus, but Stilicho overcame them at Florence. On 31 December 406, tens of thousands of Vandals, Alans, Suebi, Sarmatians and "hostile Pannonians" crossed the Rhine into Gaul. Insecurity led to insurrections in Britain, and the rebellious troops proclaimed their commanders emperors, but only one of them, Constantine III could consolidate his position. He crossed the Channel and restored peace along the Rhine through treaties with the Franks, Alemanni and Burgundians. The western crisis compromised Stilicho's position.

When Arcadius died on 1 May 408, his seven-year-old son Theodosius II succeeded him under the tutelage of the praetorian prefect Anthemius. A Hunnic leader, Uldin invaded the Balkans and demanded a tribute, but Anthemius forced him to abandon the campaign by bribing his lieutenants. Taking advantage of the Romans' distrust of Stilicho's foreign mercenaries, his former protégé Olympius staged a coup and achieved Stilicho's execution. Searching for a new homeland, the Vandals and their allies left Gaul and invaded the Iberian Peninsula in 409. Constantine III appointed his son Constans to take command of the defence, but the general Gerotnius disobeyed and proclaimed one Maximus emperor in Tarraco. Alaric invaded Italy in the autumn of 408. He demanded tribute and his appointment to a senior military office, but his negotiations with Honorius failed. On his demand, the Senatus proclaimed a Roman aristocrat Priscus Attalus emperor, but Honorius resisted at Ravenna with the support of Eastern Roman reinforcements. Alaric attacked Rome and the Visigoths sacked the city on 24 August 410. As historian Peter Heather emphasizes, the Visigoths carried out "one of the most civilized sacks of a city ever witnessed", but their capture of the old capital shocked the Roman world. After abandoning Rome, Alaric decided to conquer the wealthy northern African provinces, but a storm destroyed his fleet and he died in southern Italy.

As Honorius could no more guarantee the defense of Britain, he suggested the provincials to provide for their own protection in 410. The influx of Roman coins stopped, indicating that Britain ceased to be an integral part of the Roman world. The Vandals and their allies took control of most Roman provinces in Iberia, and Alaric's successor, Athaulf led the Visigoths to Gaul from Italy. Maximus attacked Constantine III in Gaul, but his troops deserted him on the unexpected arrival of Honorius' army under the command of the general Constantius. Maximus fled, and Constantine III was executed, but Western Roman unity was not restored. With the support of the Burgundians, Alans and Visigoths, a Gallic aristocrat Jovinus was declared emperor on the Rhine. His alliance with the Visigoths proved transitory because Honorius convinced Athaulf to desert Jovinus promising food supply to his people. Although Athaulf murdered Jovian, the Romans failed to deliver the promised grain. Athaulf married Honorius' half-sister Galla Placidia who had been captured during the sack of Rome, but fell victim to a Visigothic conspiracy in 415. Constantius restored Roman rule in southern and central Iberia and ceded Aquitania Secunda to the Visigoths in return for their assistance against the Vandals, Alans and Suebi.

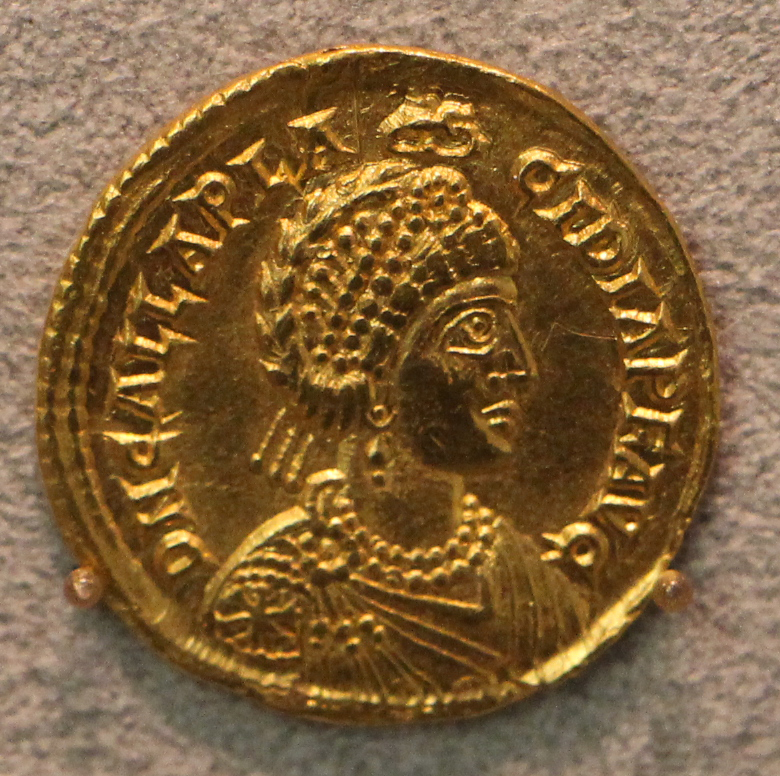
Gold solidus depicting Galla Placidia, a prominent figure in the court of two Western Roman emperors, her half-brother Honorius and her son Valentinian III

Constantius married the widowed Galla Placidia and the childless Honorius appointed them Augustus and Augusta early in 421, but Theodosius II did not acknowledge Constantius' promotion. Constantius died while planning a military campaign against the Eastern Roman Empire, and Galla Placidia lost Honorius' favor. She fled to Constantinople along with her children, Valentinian and Honoria shortly before Honorius died on 15 August 423. Three months later a high-ranking official, John was elected emperor in Rome, but Theodosius proclaimed the six-year-old Valentinian Caesar. In preparation for an invasion from the Eastern Roman Empire, John ordered the cura palatii ("curator of the palace") Flavius Aetius to hire Hunnic mercenary troops. Aetius who had spent years with the Huns as a hostage succeeded, but by the time he returned to Italy, an Eastern Roman expeditionary force had defeated John's army. John was executed and Valentinian was acknowledged as the new emperor in the west. Aetius persuaded his Hunnic mercenaries to leave Italy in return for his appointment as the new military commander in Gaul. As Valentinian was still a minor, high-ranking officers like Aetius and the military commander of Africa Bonifatius were competing for power.

The Vandals and Alans suffered heavy losses during their fights with the Romans and Visigoths in Iberia and their king Gaiseric decided to guide them to northern Africa in 429. They landed at Tangiers and Bonifatius was unable to stop their advance. The Eastern Roman general Aspar came to the rescue of Carthage, but Bonifatius was ordered to return to Italy, probably by Galla Placidia who needed his support against Aetius. Bonifacius routed Aetius at Rimini, but he died of the wounds received in the battle. Aetius secured the Huns' support, enforcing his appointment as the supreme commander of the Western Roman army in 433. In two years the Eastern Roman reinforcements left Carthage and Valentinian concluded a peace treaty with the Vandals, acknowledging their acquisition of much of northern Africa. The Huns had meanwhile established their new power base in the plains along the river Tisza and Valentinian had to cede Pannonia to them.

The Huns extracted 350 pounds of gold as a yearly tribute from the Eastern Roman Empire, and the amount was doubled in a new treaty in 434. The same treaty prohibited the Romans to receive fugitives from the Hunnic Empire, but the influx of asylum seekers could not be stopped. The Vandals resumed the war and captured Carthage in 439. Theodosius dispatched relief troops to north Africa, but a Hunnic invasion of the northern Balkans forced him to abandon the naval campaign. In return for the renewal of the peace treaty, Theodosius agreed to pay a higher yearly tribute, probably 1,400 pounds of gold, but after his fleet returned from northern Africa he ceased to pay it. In 442 Valentinian acknowledged the Vandals' conquest of two wealthy provinces, Africa proconsularis and Byzacena in return for their abandonment of the rest of the Maghreb. The Vandals built a new fleet and emerged as a major naval power in the western Mediterranean. To enforce the tribute payment from the Eastern Romans, the Hunnic king Attila plundered the Balkans as far as Constantinople and Thermopylae in 447. He only withdrew his troops when Theodosius agreed to pay 6,000 pounds of gold in compensation for the arrears and increase the annual tribute to 2,100 pounds of gold.

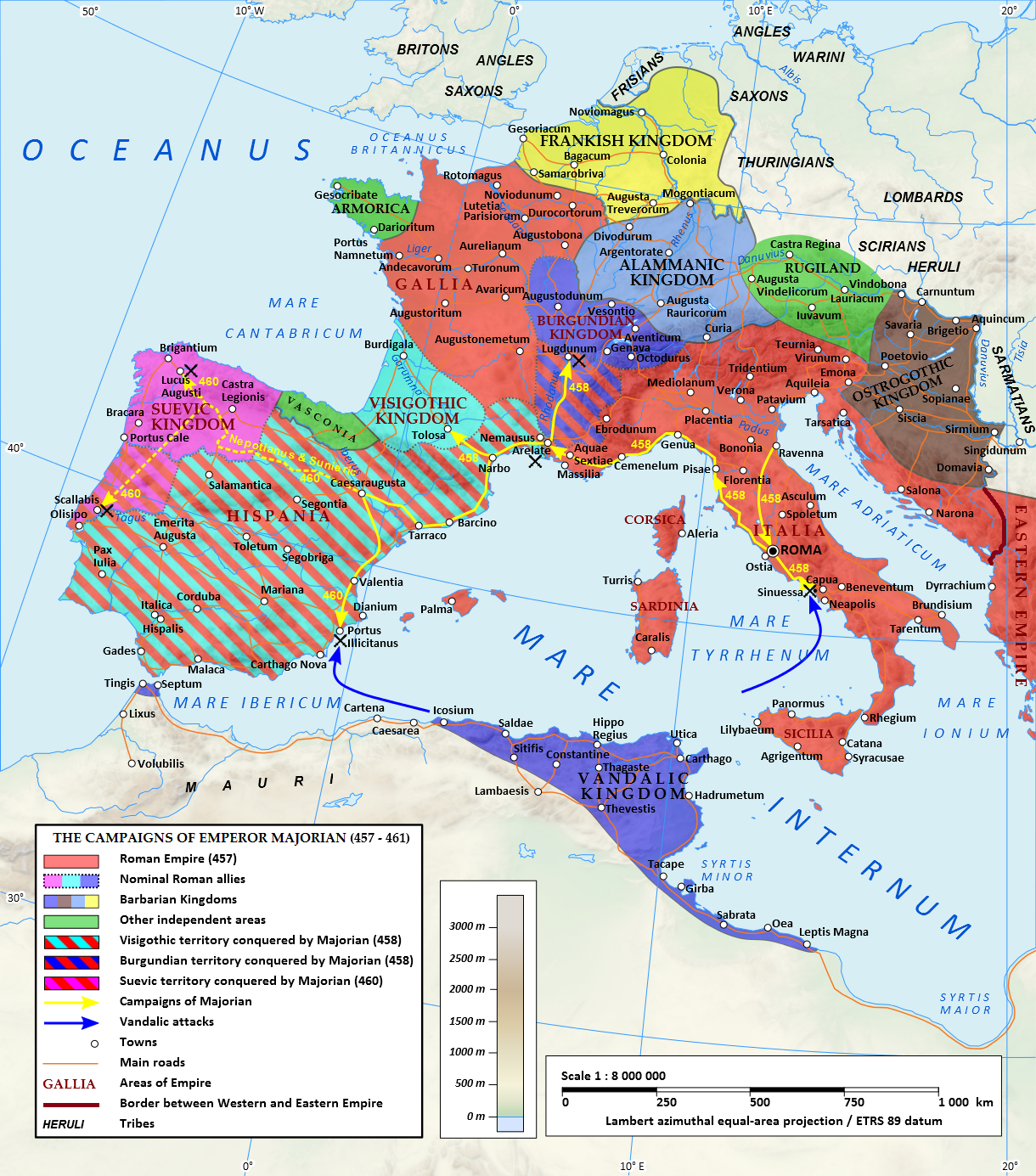
Germanic kingdoms on former Roman territory and the ruins of the Western Roman Empire around 460

The childless Theodosius died in a riding accident on 28 July 450. His sister Pulcheria chose an elderly military commander Marcian as her husband without consulting with Valentinian. She allegedly acted in concern with the all-powerful Aspar who had been Marcian's superior in the army. Marcian was proclaimed emperor in Constantinople in late August. On learning of Attila's plan about a military campaign in the west he stopped tribute payments to the Huns. (Note: Rumours spreading in Valentinian's court accused his sister Honoria of inciting Attila to attack the Western Romans. She allegedly offered her hand to the Hunnic king after her brother had executed her lover Eugenius and put her under their mother's custody. Others claimed that the Vandals bribed Attila into attacking the Western Romans.) Attila launched a massive incursion into Gaul at the head of a mixed army of Huns and subject peoples. Aetius assembled Roman, Visigothic and Burgundian troops and engaged the enemy at the Catalaunian fields in June 451. Although the battle was inconclusive, Attila withdrew from Gaul. Next year he invaded Italy, but supply problems and an epidemic forced him to again withdraw. He died unexpectedly of bleeding in 453. In a year, the Hunnic Empire collapsed due to a civil war between his sons and a revolt of the subject peoples. With the Hunnic threat vanishing, Valentinian got rid of the domineering Aetius with the assistance of his eunuch courtier Heraclius who murder the general in September 454. Aetius' death was revenged by his two retainers who assassinated Valentinian on 16 March 455.

Officials who were staying at Rome proclaimed one of their number Petronius Maximus as Valentinian's successor. He married Valentinian's widow Licinia Eudoxia. Her elder daughter by Valentinian Eudocia was married off to Maximus' son Palladius breaking her engagement to Gaiseric's heir, Huneric. The Vandals occupied the remnants of Roman Africa and Geiseric sent his fleet against Rome. News of the arrival of the Vandal ships caused panic in the city and a mob slaughtered Maximus and Palladius on 31 May. The Vandals sacked Rome for two weeks and captured many prisoners, among them Licinia Eudoxia and her two daughters, Eudocia and Placidia. While Rome was in anarchy, the Gallic troops proclaimed their commander Avitus emperor. He hastened to Rome, but his attempts to secure his Gallic and Visigothic soldiers' food supply and salary at all costs caused a general discontent. In October 456, two powerful generals Ricimer and Majorian took up arms against him, enforcing his abdication. The two generals entered into negotiations with Marcian about Avitus' succession, but Marcian died in Constantinople on 26 January 457. Marcian's son-in-law Anthemius was bypassed, and the still powerful Aspar secured the Eastern Roman throne for the Thracian Leo I who had been his lieutenant. Leo rewarded Ricimer and Majorian with honors and the two generals agreed that Majorian was to rule the Western Empire first as Caesar, then as Augustus. Majorian restored imperial rule in Gaul and launched successful campaigns against the Visigoths and Suebi, but his position weakened after the Vandals crushed his fleet.

Assuming the role of king-maker, Ricimer captured and executed Majoran and proclaimed Libius Severus, a man of unknown background, emperor in 461. Leo and most Western Roman generals did not acknowledge Severus' ascension. The Western Roman Empire quickly disintegrated as Aegidius held sway over Gaul and Marcellinus assumed power in Dalmatia. The Vandals seized Corsica, Sardinia and the Balearic Island. Severus died in November 465. A sixteen-month-long interregnum followed until Ricimer and Leo accepted Anthemius as a compromise candidate. Marcellinus accompanied Anthemius to Rome and Ricimer married Anthemius' daughter Alypia. Eastern and western forces were united for a common attack against the Vandals in Sardinia and Sicily, but during the campaign Marcellinus was murdered, likely on Ricimer's order. In Gaul, the imperial government left the provincials to their fate. After Aegidius died in 464, his son Syagrius ruled the Roman enclaves. In the east, Leo I promoted the career of an Isaurian commander Zeno to diminish Aspar's power. He married off his daughter Ariadne to Zeno, but his younger daughter Leontia was in short married to Aspar's son Patricius who was made Caesar on this occasion. In 471 a popular riot broke out against Aspar and his mainly Gothic troops in Constantinople, enabling Leo to arrest and murder Aspar. The Gothic mercenaries mutinied and the rebellion enabled the Pannonian Goths, known as Ostrogoths, to invade the Balkans, and the Gepids to seize Sirmium. Leo could only appease the Ostrogoths through land grants in Macedonia and Thrace.

Relationship between Ricimer and Anthemius grew tense and Ricimer attacked Rome with the assistance with his Burgundian nephew Gundobad. Leo appointed a Roman aristocrat Olybrius to mediate between Anthemius and Ricimer. Olybrius had married Valentinian III's younger daughter Placidia. On his arrival to Rome, he was proclaimed emperor by Ricimer. In July 472 Rome surrendered and Ricimer's troops killed Anthemius, but both Ricimer and Olybrius died before the end of the year. After a five-month interregnum, Gundobad acclaimed Glycerius, a court official, emperor, but Leo sent Marcellinus' nephew Julius Nepos to Rome to claim the imperial throne. Gundobad's father, the Burgundian king Gondioc, died in 473, and he left Italy to claim his inheritance. After his protector's departure, Glycerius abdicated in Julius Nepos' favor. In Constantinople, Leo was succeeded by his seven-year-old grandson Leo II in 474. His father Zeno assumed the regency. When the child-emperor died before the end of the year Zeno became the new emperor. His mother-in-law Verina and her brother Basiliscus forced him to flee from Constantinople with the support of the Isaurian general Illus and the Ostrogothic leader Theoderic Strabo. Basiliscus was proclaimed emperor, but he lost popular support due to his interventions in church affairs. Zeno returned to Constantinople and deposed Basiliscus without much opposition in 476. In Rome, a powerful Pannonian general Orestes mutinied against Julius Nepos, forcing him to withdraw to Dalmatia. Orestes proclaimed his son Romulus Augustulus the new emperor at Ravenna, but he was unable to pay off his troops and they rebelled. One of their commanders, Odoacer, captured Orestes and deposed Romulus Augustulus on 4 September 476.

Emperors of the Theodosian dynasty

Count Theodosius †376
Aelia Flaccilla	Theodosius I *347 †395 (r. 379–395)	Galla	Honorius
Stilicho †404 magister militum	Serena
Aelia Eudoxia †404	Arcadius * c. 377 †408 (r. 395–408)	Honorius * c. 384 †423 (r. 395–423)	Maria
Athaulf †414; Visigothic king	Galla Placidia; *388 †450	Constantius III †421 (r. 421)
Theodosius II; *401 †450 (r. 408–450)	Aelia Eudocia	Unknown wife	Marcian; *392 †457 (r. 450–457)	Pulcheria; *399 †463
Unknown wife	Petronius Maximus †455 (r. 455)	Licinia Eudoxia; *422 † c. 462	Valentinian III; *419 †455 (r. 425–455)
Anthemius †472 (r. 467–472)	Marcia Euphemia
Palladius †455	Eudocia	Huneric †484; Vandal king	Placidia	Olybrius †472 (r. 472)
Hilderic †533; Vandal king

== Survival and reconquest ==
The early-6th-century historian Marcellinus Comes states that the "Western Empire of the Roman people perished" with the deposition of Romulus Augustulus. Odoacer's appointment as patricius by Zeno legitimized his position as the actual ruler of Italy, but he mainly styled himself rex ("king") in official documents. He recognized Julius Nepos and Zeno as emperors and minted coins in their name. The Visigothic king Euric captured Arles and Marseille in Gaul. After Zeno confirmed his conquest, Euric began the systematic conquest of the Iberian Peninsula. In 480 Julius Nepos was assassinated and Odoacer seized Dalmatia. Syagrius died fighting the Franks at Soissons and their king Clovis I conquered the last Roman enclave in Gaul in 486. Zeno had been unable to stabilise his rule in the east. Unpaid Ostrogothic troops launched pillaging raids against the Balkan provinces and Theodoric Strabo nearly captured Constantinople before died in a riding accident in 481. Zeno's claim to rule was challenged by his brother-in-law Marcianus in 479, and by the Isaurian general Leontius in 484, but he overcame them with the support of hastily mustered troops. To eliminate Ostrogothic threat from the Balkans, he offered Odoacer's realm to the Ostrogothic king Theodoric the Amal, who completed the conquest of Dalmatia and Italy between 488 and 493. He had Odoacer executed.

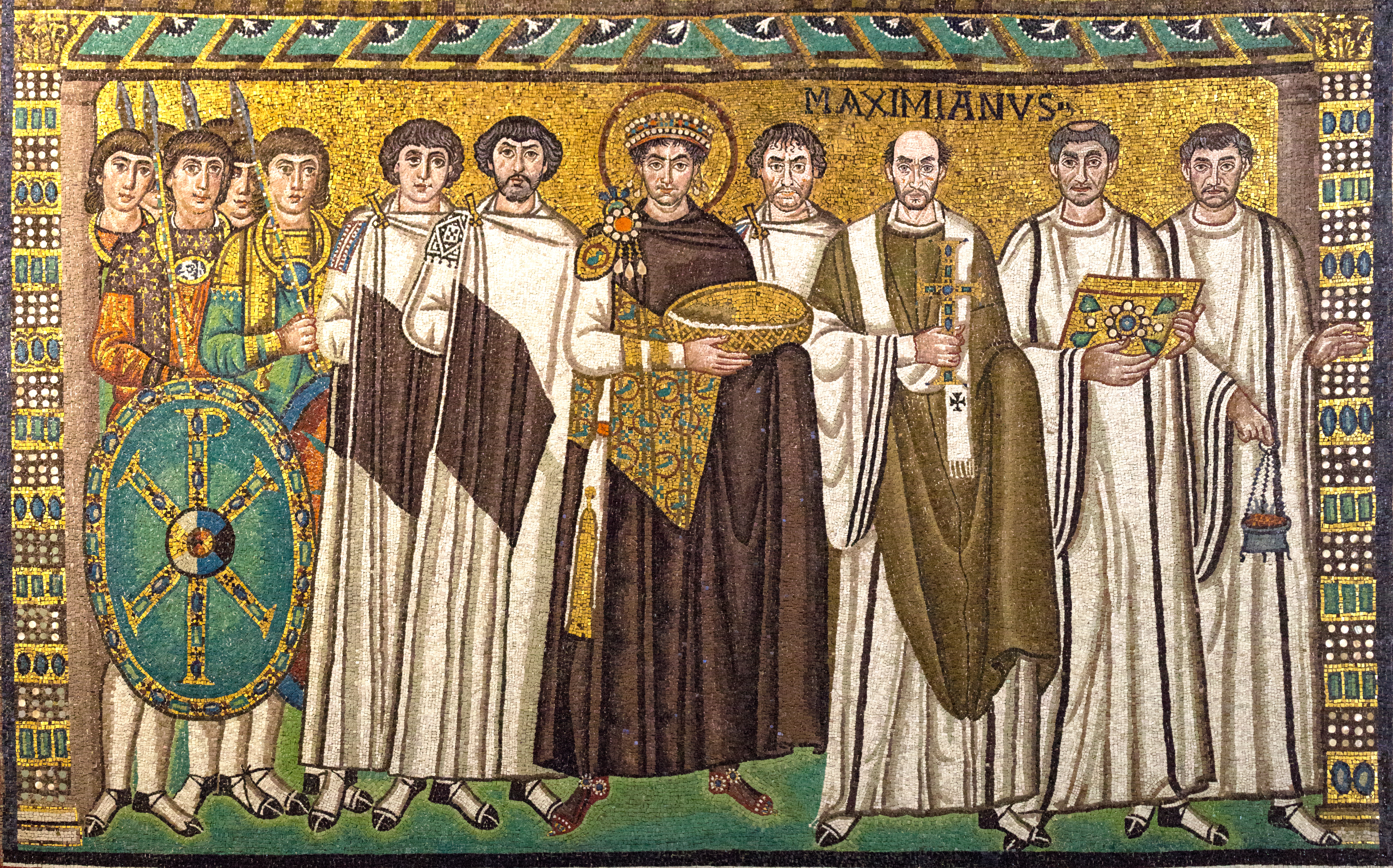
Emperor Justinian and his courtiers (Basilica of San Vitale, Ravenna, Italy)

As Zeno outlived his two sons, his death caused a succession crisis in April 491. His brother Longinus could claim the throne, but the high-ranking officials despised him. On their intervention the widowed Ariadne chose an elderly court official, Anastasius I Dicorus, as her second husband and the new emperor. He exiled Longinus to Egypt, and his troops crushed a revolt by Longinus' supporters in Isauria. Popular riots and street-fighting between the fans of two racing teams, the Greens and the Blues, caused much destruction in Constantinople. The Lower Danube remained barely defended, enabling Hunnic, Bulgar and Slavic groups to make frequent pillaging raids against the Balkan provinces. In the east, Arabs raided Syria and Palestine, and the Sassanian king Kavad I demanded a tribute from Anastasius in 502. Anastasius refused, but after years of mutual invasions, promised to pay a symbolic yearly tribute of 36,900 nomismata. He died on 8 July 518. Two days later, the Senate elected the Latin-speaking commander of the palace guard Justin I emperor. He summoned his relatives to the imperial court and appointed Illyrians to high offices. In Italy, Theoderic discovered that Roman senators entered into correspondence about the restoration of Roman rule and had them arrested for treason in 523. His magister officiorum, or master of offices, Boethius were among the suspects, and Theoderic had him executed. The Christian kings of the Caucasian Lazica and Iberia sought Justin's protection against the Sassanians. In retaliation, Kavad I resumed the war against the Romans.

The childless and ailing Justin appointed his nephew Justinian I as Augustus shortly before he died on 1 August 527. Justinian was one of the most ambitious Roman emperors and he implemented systematic reforms to improve state administration and the army. He continued the war against the Sassanians, but neither the Roman nor the Persian army could achieve a decisive victory. In spring of 532 Justinian and the new Sassanian king Khosrow I concluded a peace treaty whereby Justinian paid 11,000 pounds of gold, reportedly in remuneration for the defense of the Caucasian passes by the Sassanians. Justinian introduced harsh measures against rioters to restore public order in the major cities, and his officials implemented his laws with great vigour. After a bloody riot following the races on 10 January 532, seven fans of the racing teams were arrested for murder. Five were executed, but one each from the Blue and the Green team escaped. Three days later, at the next racing, the Blues and the Greens made public appeals to Justinian on the two convicts' behalf, but he ignored them. The fans of both clubs united in a riot of elementary force, chanting the word Nika ("Conquer!") as a rallying cry. Although the Nika riots lasted for less than a week, the rioters destroyed much of the city center. Justinian's three generals, Narses, Belisarius and Mundus, crushed the riot mercilessly, reportedly slaughtering at least 30,000 townspeople.

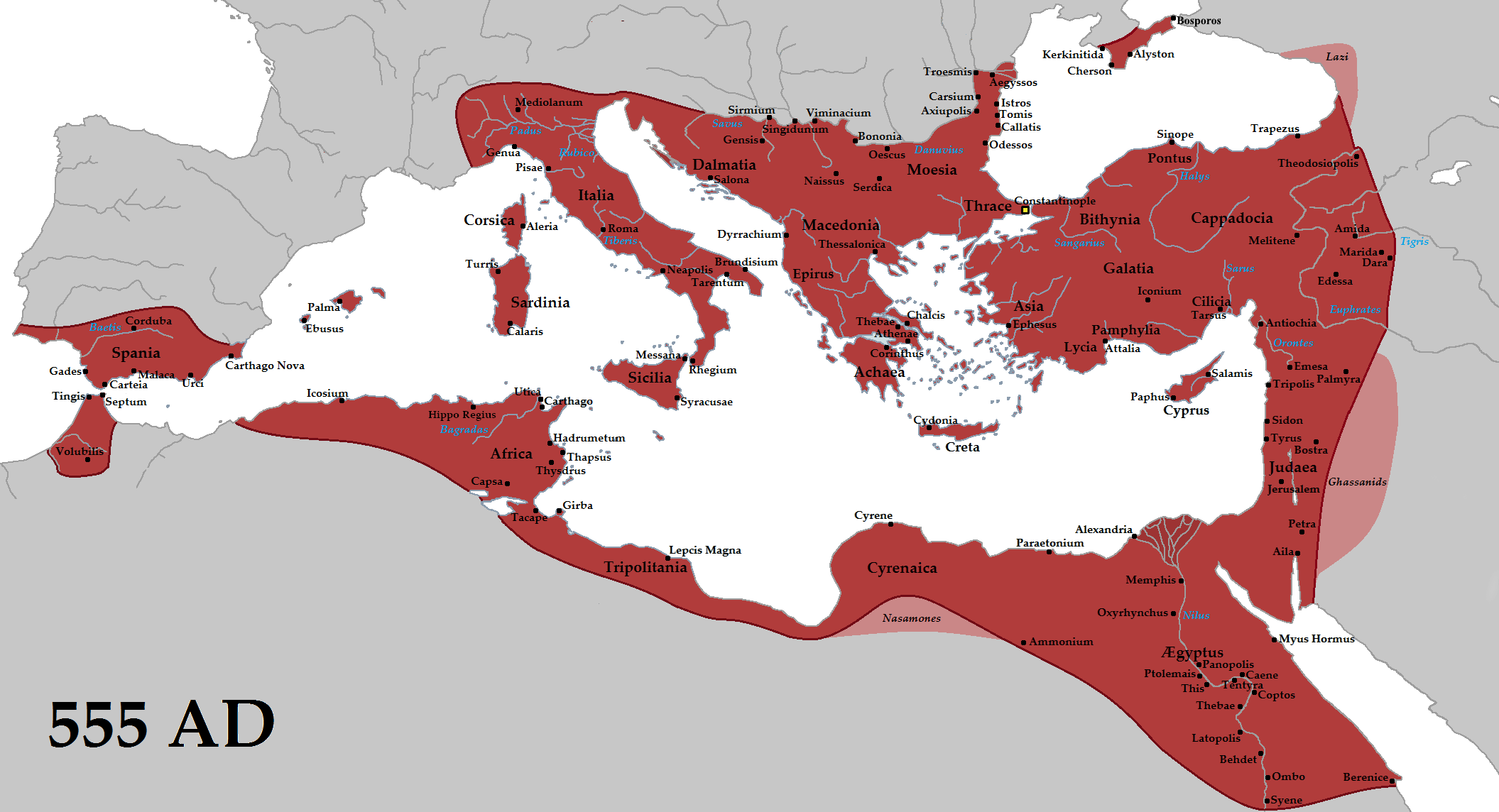
The Roman Empire around 555

The pro-Roman Vandal king Hilderic was deposed by his cousin Gelimer in 530. The ensuing insurrections in Sardinia and Tripolitania provided Justinian with a pretext to intervene. He appointed Belisarius to lead the invasion against the Vandal Kingdom early in 533. Theodoric's daughter, Amalasuntha, who ruled the Ostrogothic Kingdom in Italy as regent for her son Athalaric, allowed the Roman expeditionary forces to use the port of Syracuse during the campaign. In a year, Belisarius defeated the Vandals with the native population's support and conquered their kingdom. The pacification of the reconquered northern African territories lasted for years because of riots by unruly Berber tribes and their cooperations with rebellious Roman troops. In Italy, Athalaric died and Amalasuntha's cousin Theodahad had her assassinated in 535. An unidentified natural catastrophe, likely dust from a major volcanic eruption, darkened the sun between 24 March 535 and 24 June 536. The low temperature caused disastrous crop failures and massive famine. The catastrophe did not prevent Justinian from going to war against the Ostrogoths. In 535 Mundus conquered Dalmatia and Belisarius captured Sicily. During the following five years, Belisarius occupied almost whole Italy, but an Ostrogothic kingdom survived in the north. Taking advantage of the concentration of the Roman troops in Italy, the Bulgars launched a pillaging raid over the Balkans, and Khosrow resumed the war. He invaded Syria, sacked Antioch and restored Sassanian suzerainty over Lazica.

From 541 to 543, the first outbreak of bubonic plague ravaged the Roman Empire and its neighbors. The death toll was tremendous, particularly in the largest cities, (Note: The Syrian John of Ephesus notes that more than 230,000 people (about one third of the total population) died of the plague in Constantinople in 542. Evagrius Scholasticus lost his wife, their only son and a daughter, along with "other relatives, and numerous servants and estate dwellers" in Antioch between 542 and 594.) and epidemic recurred several times. Justinian was among the few who caught the plague but survived. Although the Sassanian Empire was also struck by the plague, Khosrow made a new incursion against Syria in 544. His siege of Edessa was unsuccessful, and early next year he signed a five-year truce in return for the lump sum of 144,000 nomismata. The conflict between the two empires enabled the Ostrogothic king, Totila to expel the Romans from much of Italy. Cooperating with unpaid Roman troops, he could termporarily seize Rome in 546 and 550. Justinian sent Narses with fresh troops to Italy and he defeated the Ostrogoths at Taginae in 552. Totila perished in the battlefield, and his successor Teia died fighting in the Battle of Mons Lactarius. The Ostrogothic Kingdom collapsed, although small Ostrogothic groups resisted at Cumae and other places till 562. In 551, a rebellious Visigothic aristocrat, Athanagild, sought Roman alliance against King Agila. Justinian appointed the praetorian prefect of Italy Liberius to lead an expeditionary force against the Visigothic Kingdom. Cooperating with Roman rebels, Liberius conquered southern Hispania. To defend the Balkan provinces against further raids by the Hunnic Utigurs, the Romans persuaded an other steppe people the Kutrigurs to attack them in the 550s. The Kutrigurs were attacked from the east by the nomadic Avars. Tensions along the western frontier developed into a new armed conflict between Rome and the Sassanians until a new peace treaty was signed for fifty years in 562.

== Consequences of overexpansion ==
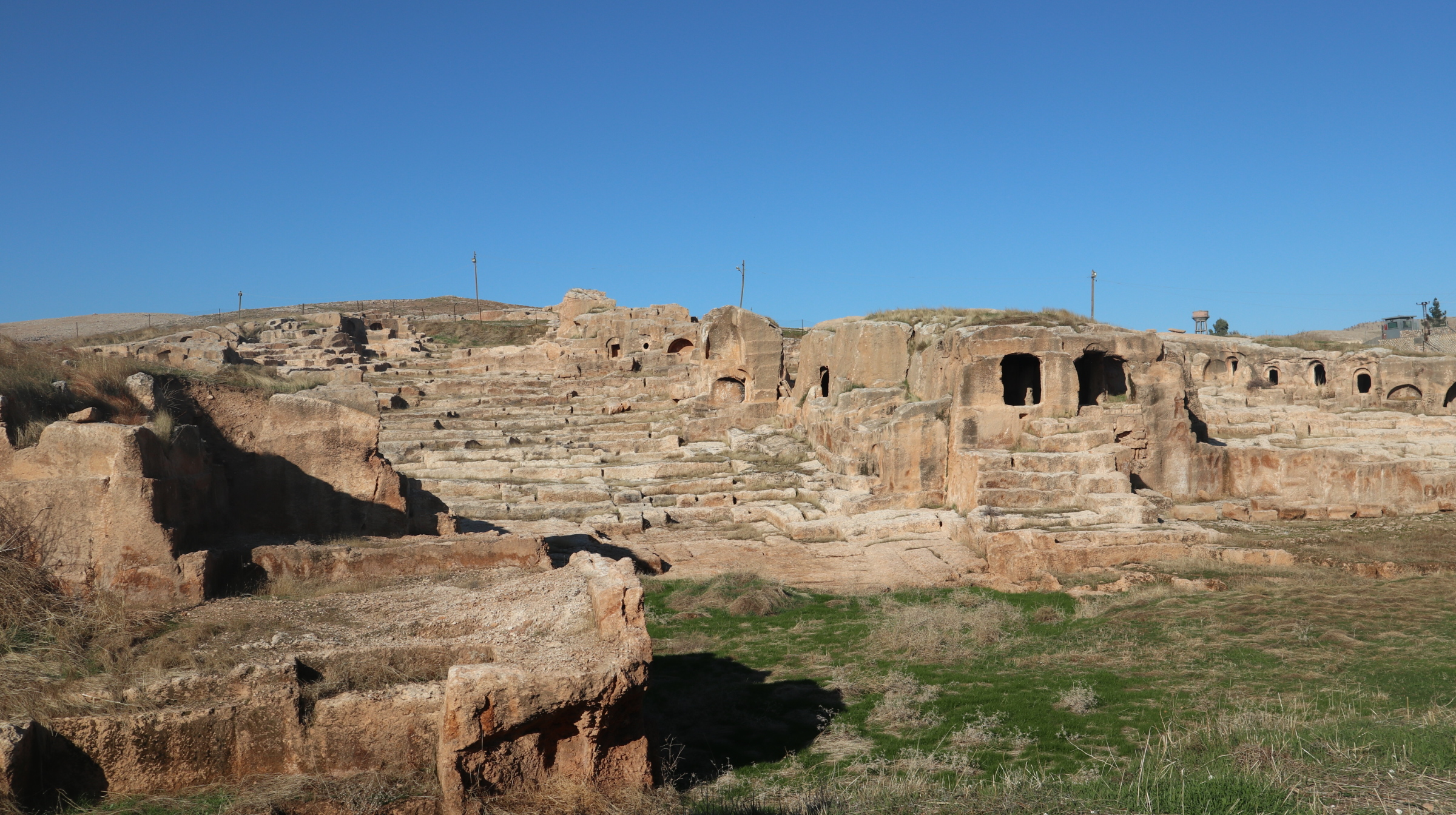
Ruins of Dara, an important fortress on the Roman–Persian border in Mesopotamia

Justinian, as historian Warren Treadgold emphasizes, "had added more land to the empire than any emperors but Trajan and Augustus", but the preservation of the territorial status quo was a costly enterprise. When Justinian died on 14 November 565, the sole courtier who was present, the sacellarius Callinicus stated that the dying emperor had named his nephew Justin II as his sole heir. Justinian's death was announced only after Justin's coronation. The Avars defeated the Gepids and conquered their realm in alliance with the Lombards in 567. After the Gepids' fall, the Romans seized Sirmium, and the Lombard king Alboin realized that he could not resist an Avar invasion of Pannonia. He led his people to Italy where they occupied the Po Valley. After Alboin was murdered in 573, ambitious Lombard chieftains continued the conquest, but central Italy, Naples, Calabria and Sicily remained under Roman rule. In southern Iberia, the Visigothic king Liuvigild captured Málaga, Medina-Sidonia and Córdova from the Romans. A Berber king Garmul targeted northern Africa and inflicted major defeats on the Romans. After an Armenian revolt, Justin resumed the war against Persia, but the Persians quickly halted the Roman invasion and Khosrow I captured Dara on 15 November 573. On learning of the fall of this key fortress of Roman defense, Justin experienced a nervous breakdown. His wife Sophia and the senators jointly convinced him to appoint his friend the Thracian general Tiberius Caesar in late 574.

Tiberius paid 45,000 solidi to Khosrow for a one-year peace. A year later he agreed to pay a yearly tribute of 30,000 solidi. He was proclaimed Augustus shortly before Justin died on 26 September 578. He wanted to renew the peace treaty with the Persians, but the new Sassanian king Hormizd IV refused, likely because he was aware of the Romans' troubles in the West. Tiberius appointed a Cappadocian general Maurice the commander of the eastern army. The unpaid troops were on the verge of mutiny, but Maurice adopted an offensive tactic until a Persian counter-invasion forced him into retreat. Unable to wage war on two fronts simultaneously, Tiberius left the Balkan frontiers undefended. He hired the Avars to prevent Slavic raids over the Lower Danube, but he failed to pay the promised yearly tribute—about 1,100 pounds of gold—to them. In retaliation, the Avars seized Sirmium in 582. From then on, the Slavs freely crossed the Lower Danube and started to settle in Roman territory.

On his deathbed, Tiberius – who had no sons – proclaimed Maurice Augustus. When Tiberius died in August or October 582, Maurice succeeded as the sole emperor. He was the first emperor to speak Greek at native level since Anastasius. He married Tiberius' daughter Constantina. He hired the Frankish king Childebert II to attack the Lombards, and with Frankish assistance the Romans halted the Lombard expansion in Italy. The Avars and Slavs made devastating raids as far as Marcianopolis and Thessaloniki, but both towns resisted their attack. In 590, a rebellious Persian general, Bahram Chobin, murdered Hormizd IV and forced his heir Khosrow II to seek asylum with the Romans. Khosrow approached Maurice for assistance and Maurice appointed the general Narses to invade the Sassanian Empire. The Romans and Khosrow's supporters routed Bahram in the Battle of the Blarathon. After regaining his throne, Khosrow ceded Armenia and eastern Mesopotamia, including Dara, to the Romans. The peace allowed Maurice to relocate his troops to the Balkans and they launched a series of invasions against Slavic and Avar territory after 593. When a famine caused a riot in Constantinople in 602, Maurice ordered a Roman army to winter in Slavic territory, living off the land over the Danube, but the troops mutinied and proclaimed the centurion Phocas emperor. Phocas led his partisans to Constantinople, and a riot forced Maurice to flee the city. After Phocas secured the support of the Greens and the Senate, Patriarch Cyriacus II of Constantinople crowned him emperor on 23 November. Four days later, Maurice and his sons were captured and executed.

== Disintegration ==
Phocas replaced many high-ranking officers with his relatives. He could not gain popularity, and he faced popular riots in Constanstinople. The Avars and the Lombards made simultaneous raids against Dalmatia, and Slavic troops in Avar service assisted the Lombards to capture Cremona and Mantua in Italy. In the east, Narses took up arms in favor of a young pretender whom he had identified as Maurice's son, Theodosius, claiming that Theodosius survived the purge. A hastily concluded peace treaty with the Avars enabled Phocas to deploy troops against Narses from the Balkans. As the Balkans was left almost undefended, the Slavs resumed their raids and attacked Thessaloniki. Narses's revolt provided Khosrow II with a pretext to capture and destroy Dara in 604. Narses was fooled into surrender with a promise of amnesty, but Phocas had him burnt alive.

The plague returned and a bad harvest caused a famine in 608. Maurice's old comrade Heraclius, who was the governor of Roman Africa, revolted and refused to ship grain to Constantinople. He sent a fleet to Sicily under the command of his son and namesake, and appointed his nephew Nicetas to invade Egypt. Phocas was forced to relocate troops from the eastern provinces to Egypt, enabling the Persians to make raids as far as the Bosporus. In 610, Nicetas overcame the loyalist forces in Egypt, and the younger Heraclius sailed for Constantinople. On his arrival in October, the Greens and the commander of the imperial guard, Priscus deserted to him. A mob captured Phocas and dragged him to Heraclius, who reportedly beheaded him in person.

On Heraclius' ascension the empire was in ruins. His father died in Africa, and he could trust only a few people. He concentrated his troops in Anatolia and appointed Priscus as their commander. Between 610 and 613, the Persians captured Caesarea in Cappadocia, and Antioch, Apamea and Emesa in Syria. Heraclius dismissed Priscus and took command of the Anatolian army in person, but the Persians routed him near Antioch. The Sassanian general Shahrbaraz seized Damascus and Jerusalem. After he left Jerusalem the Christians expelled his garrison, but he quickly returned and conquered the city. He deported the mass of the Christian population to Persia. Meanwhile, Slavic tribes seized much of Illyricum, the Avars captured Salona, Naissus and Serdica, and the Visigoths conquered most Roman territory in Iberia.

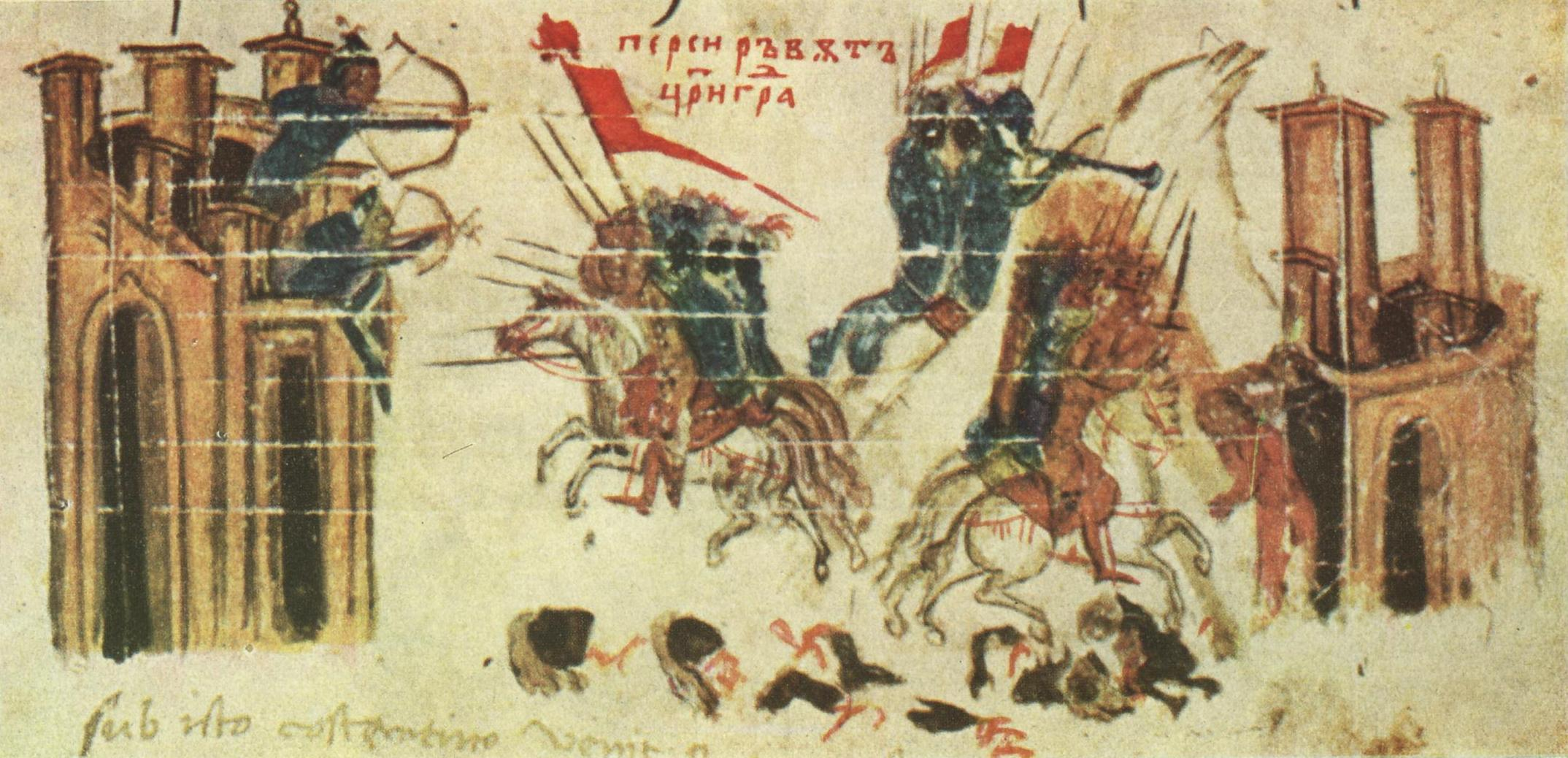
Sassanian troops attack Constantinople, and Heraclius besieges a Persian fortress in 626 (from a 14th-century manuscript of Constantine Manasses's Chronicle)

The Persian invasion continued: Shahrbaraz occupied Egypt in 620, and an other Persian general, Shahin launched devastating raids against Anatolia. Heraclius could muster new troops only after he convinced Patriarch Sergius I of Constantinople to lend gold and silver to the state. In early 622 he made a truce with the Avars and attacked the Persians in Anatolia. He defeated Shahrbaraz in Cilicia, but news of an Avar invasion of Thrace forced him to return to Constantinople. He paid 200,000 nomismata to the Avars for the renewal of the truce, and hastened back to the eastern theatre of war. The Persians and Avars joined their forces in an attack on Constantinople in the summer of 626, but they could not conquer the city. The Slavs revolted against their Avar overlords and the Avars could not again attack the Romans. Heraclius resumed the invasion of the Sassanian Empire and routed the Persians at Nineveh. Khosrow was murdered and his son Kavad II concluded a peace treaty with Heraclius, giving up all territories that his predecessors had conquered from the Romans after 591. The Sassanian Empire plunged into anarchy and Roman rule was quickly restored in Syria and Egypt.

The Romans did not regard the disorganized Arab tribes of the Arabian Desert as potentially dangerous enemies early in the 7th century. However, the Arabic Ghassanids and Lakhmids had been deeply involved in the Roman–Persian wars, and the Arabization of the Near East had started. Arab tribes settled in thinly populated lands near the Roman–Persian frontier, and the thriving Syrian and Mesopotamian cities attracted Arab settlers. The situation changed rapidly with the unification of the desert tribes by the Islamic prophet Muhammad between 622 and 632. After he died, his monotheistic movement was led by his successors, styled caliphs, who were both the political and religious leaders of the Islamic community. Conducting the jihad, or Islamic holy war, against the "infidels", the Arabs attacked the Syrian Roman territories and conquered Damascus in 633. Heraclius deployed a Roman field army against the Arabs, but they annihilated the Roman army on the Yarmuk River in Syria in 636. As the war against Persia had exhausted the empire, Heraclius could not send a second field army against the invaders and they conquered Syria. Two years later, the Arabs inflicted a major defeat on the Persians at Qadisiyyah. As the Arabs continued the invasion, Heraclius sent reinforcements to Egypt, but they could not halt the invaders. Patriarch Cyrus of Alexandria offered a yearly tribute of 200,000 nomismata to the Arab general Amr ibn al-As for a truce and went to Constantinople to seek imperial confirmation. Heraclius refused, likely because he knew that a tribute would not stop the conquerors on the long run. On Cyrus' arrival, Heraclius was already dying, and he died on 11 February 641.

== Aftermath ==
The ancient world came to an abrupt end with early Islamic conquests. The Sassanian Empire collapsed and the Arabs completed its conquest by 651. The Roman Empire persisted, but its territory shrunk. With the loss of Syria, Egypt and Africa, Rome was no more the dominant Mediterranean power, and the Roman state persisted in the east mainly in the shadow of the more powerful Umayyad Caliphate. The empire's remaining citizens continued to regard themselves as Romans (Greek: Ρωμαίοι), however since 610 the official language was changed to Greek. The term "Byzantines", nowadays applied in reference to them, is an early modern scholarly invention.

== Sources ==
- Cameron, Averil (1993). The Later Roman Empire, AD 284–430. Fontanta History of the Ancient World. Vol. 6. Fontana Press. ISBN 978-0-00-686172-0.
- Elton, Hugh (2018). The Roman Empire in Late Antiquity: A Political and Military History. Cambridge University Press. ISBN 978-1-108-45631-9.
- Fowden, Garth (2000) [1999]. "Religious Communities". In Bowersock, G. W.; Brown, Peter; Grabar, Oleg (eds.). Late Antiquity: A Guide to the Postclassical World. The Belknap Press of Harvard University Press. pp. 82–106. ISBN 0-674-51173-5.
- Heather, Peter (2006) [2005]. The Fall of the Roman Empire: A New History of Rome and the Barbarians. Oxford University Press. ISBN 978-0-19-532541-6.
- Lee, A. D. (2013). From Rome to Byzantium, AD 363 to 565: The Transformation of Ancient Rome. The Edinburgh History of Ancient Rome. Vol. 8. Edinburgh University Press. ISBN 978-0-7486-2791-2.
- Mitchell, Stephen (2017) [2007]. A History of the Later Roman Empire, AD 284–641. Blackwell History of the Ancient World. Vol. 3. Wiley-Blackwell. ISBN 978-1-118-31242-1.
- Treadgold, Warren (1997). A History of the Byzantine State and Society. Stanford University Press. ISBN 0-8047-2630-2.
