= Serena (given name) =

- Pronunciation: English: /səˈriːnə/ sə-REE-nə; Latin: [sɛˈreːna] Italian: [seˈreːna]
- Gender: Female

Origin
- Language: Latin
- Meaning: "clear, tranquil, serene;" Various (Japanese)

Other names
- Related names: Serenity, Serenus

Serena is a feminine given name. It is derived from the Latin word serēnus, meaning "clear, tranquil, serene". This name was borne by one of the first saints, Serena of Rome, purported wife of Emperor Diocletian.

Serena gained currency as a feminine given name in Japan beginning around the 1980s. Common kanji spellings include 星礼奈, 瀬怜奈, and 世伶奈.

== People ==
- Serena (wife of Stilicho) (c. 370–408), important noblewoman of the late Western Roman Empire
- Serena Altschul (born 1970), broadcast journalist
- Serena Bocchino (born 1960), American artist
- Serena Brancale (born 1989), Italian singer-songwriter
- Serena Auñón-Chancellor (born 1976), American physician, engineer, and NASA astronaut
- Serena Katherine Dandridge (1878–1956), American scientific illustrator, painter, naturalist, and suffragist
- Serena Daolio (born 1972), Italian soprano singer
- Serena DeBeer (born 1973), American chemist
- Serena Deeb (born 1986), American professional wrestler
- Serena Grandi (born 1958), Italian actress
- Serena Ivaldi Italian-born robotics researcher
- Serena Kani (born 1999), Indonesian badminton player
- Serena McIlwain, American government official
- Serena McKay (1997–2017), a Canadian woman whose brutal murder was posted online (see Murder of Serena McKay)
- Serena Nanda (born 1938), American author, anthropologist, and professor emeritus
- Serena Ortolani (born 1987), Italian volleyball player
- Serena Pergher (born 2004), Italian speed skater
- Serena Ryder (born 1982), Canadian singer-songwriter
- Serena Shim (1985–2014), American journalist
- Serena Sundell (born 2003), American basketball player
- Serena Williams (born 1981), American tennis player
- Serena Sonoda (園田 世玲奈, born 1996), Japanese racewalking athlete.

== Fictional characters ==
- Serena, cousin of main character Samantha Stephens in Bewitched; both roles were played by Elizabeth Montgomery
- Serena (Pokémon), the playable female protagonist in Pokémon X and Y and one of the main characters in the Pokémon anime
- Serena, in the film The Devil Wears Prada
- Serena, in Edmund Spenser's poem The Faerie Queene
- Serena, in the film Terminator Salvation
- Serena, a swan in E. B. White's children's novel The Trumpet of the Swan
- Serena, one of the main characters from the video game Dragon Quest XI
- Serena the Healer, one of the heroes from the video game Master of Magic
- Serena, a character played by Deepika Padukone in XXX: The Return of Xander Cage
- Serena Ainsworth, in the Gilmore Girls revival series Gilmore Girls: A Year in the Life
- Serena Baldwin, in the American soap operas General Hospital and Port Charles
- Serena Bishop, in the Australian soap opera Neighbours
- Serena Butler, from the Legends of Dune series of books
- Serena Kamin, in the 1998 American comedy movie My Giant
- Serena Southerlyn, a district attorney in Law & Order
- Serena Tsukino, the English dub name of the Japanese character Usagi Tsukino (English: Sailor Moon), the main character in Sailor Moon media
- Serena van der Woodsen, Gossip Girl character
- Serena Joy, an antagonistic character in The Handmaid's Tale, named Serena Joy Waterford in the television adaptation
- Serena, a character in season 1 of That '90s Show
- Serena, in the Disney Channel show Primos

== See also ==
- Serena (disambiguation)
