= Saint Serena =

Saint Serena may be:

- Serena of Rome - (3rd century), legendary figure, erroneously believed to be the wife of Diocletian, celebrated on August 16
- Serena of Spoleto - (4th century), martyr in Spoleto, celebrated on December 7

Geography

- Santa Serena , toponym in the town of Schizzanello in the Roma Capitale.

== See also ==
- Serena (given name)
- Serena (disambiguation)
