= Saint Nicholas and Saint Alexandra Church =

- Église Saint-Nicolas-et-Sainte-Alexandra de Nice
- Saint Nicholas and Saint Alexandra Church
- 43.699386°N 7.267608°E
- Location: Nice, France
- Denomination: Eastern Orthodox

History
- Dedication: Saint Nicholas, Saint Alexandra

Architecture
- Heritage designation: Monument historique
- Style: Byzantine Revival

The Saint Nicholas and Saint Alexandra Church (French: Église Saint-Nicolas-et-Sainte-Alexandra) or Saints Nicholas and Alexandra Church (French: Église Saints-Nicolas-et-Alexandra) is an orthodox church in Nice (Alpes-Maritimes), on rue Longchamp. It is dedicated to Saint Nicholas and Saint Alexandra.

== History ==
After the annexation of Nice to France, it was the second Russian Orthodox place of worship in the country (after an oratory in Paris, on rue de Berri, opened in 1816), and therefore the only church of this religious tradition, before the consecration of the Saint Alexander Nevsky cathedral in Paris in September 1861. It is also the second Orthodox church in France after the Greek Orthodox Church of the Dormition of the Mother of God in Marseille, built in 1834.

The church and the adjoining garden were listed as monuments historiques by decree of April 3, 1990.

== Architecture ==
=== Exterior ===
The initial constraints imposed on the architect Koudinov excluded a bell tower and cemetery in favor of a garden to the south. These constraints have been respected.
