= Minervina =

Wife or concubine of Constantine I

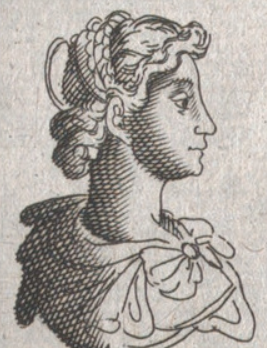
- Imaginary portrait (1587)

Roman empress
- Tenure: 306–307 (alongside Galeria Valeria 306–307 and Valeria Maximilla 306–307)
- Spouse: Constantine I (disputed)
- Issue: Crispus

Minervina was either the first wife or concubine of Constantine I, and the mother of his eldest son and future caesar Crispus. Little is known of her life. Her birth and death dates are unknown.

== Life ==
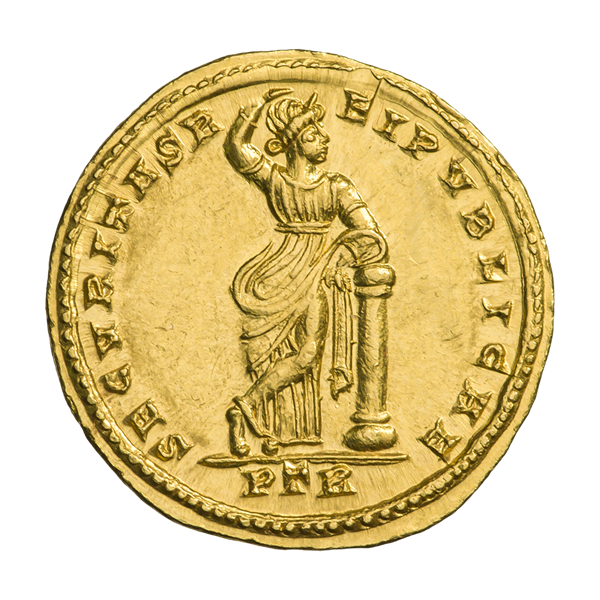
Reverse of a solidus of Crispus, marked: SECVRITAS REI PVBLICAE ("the security of the State")

Constantine spent his early life in Nicomedia as a political hostage in Diocletian's court. Constantine had a relationship with Minervina. Ancient historians Aurelius Victor and Zosimus refer to Minervina as a concubine. On the other hand, a panegyric delivered around 310 states that Constantine was married at a very early age, around the year 290. Barnes, Woods and PLRE view the panegyric as proof that Minervina was married to Constantine, while Pohlsander considers the possibility of the panegyrist not being entirely truthful.

Crispus's year of birth is nowhere outright stated, she must have given birth to him before 307. Constantine provided a formal education to his son and Crispus was elevated to the rank of princeps iuventutis as well as holding the office of Consul three times. This may suggest that the marriage of Constantine and Minervina was a legal Roman marriage. When Constantine wanted to strengthen his alliance with the other Tetrarchs, in 307 AD he married Fausta, the daughter of the emperor Maximian. Minervina might have already been dead by 307, but it is possible that Constantine initiated a divorce with her. Minervina does not appear in the historical record after 307 AD.

== See also ==
- Christianization of the Roman Empire

== Sources ==
- Barnes, Timothy D. (1982). The New Empire of Diocletian and Constantine. Cambridge, MA: Harvard University Press. doi:10.4159/harvard.9780674280670. ISBN 0-674-28066-0.
- Martindale, John R.; Jones, A. H. M.; Morris, John, eds. (1971). The Prosopography of the Later Roman Empire: Volume I, AD 260–395. Cambridge: Cambridge University Press. ISBN 0-521-07233-6.
- Pohlsander, Hans, "Constantine I (306 – 337 A.D.)", De Imperatoribus Romanis site.
- Pohlsander, Hans A. (1984). "Crispus: Brilliant Career and Tragic End". Historia: Zeitschrift für Alte Geschichte. 33 (1): 79–106. JSTOR 4435872.
- Woods, David (1998). "On the Death of the Empress Fausta". Greece & Rome. 45 (1): 70–86. doi:10.1093/gr/45.1.70.
