= Serenity (given name) =

- Gender: Feminine

Origin
- Origin: English
- Meaning: peace, tranquility

Other names
- Related names: Serena

Serenity is a modern English name taken from the word “serenity” meaning “peaceful”.

The name has risen in popularity in the United States in recent years. It has ranked among the top 500 names given to newborn American girls since 2000 and ranked among the top 100 names for newborn girls between 2009 and 2022. It peaked in popularity in 2013, when it was the 52nd most popular name for American girls born in that year. It is a name that is notably more commonly used by whites in rural states of the United States compared with those in more urban areas. Serenity was one of the five most popular names given to girls born to Black mothers in the United States state of Virginia in 2023. While the name was in use prior to 2002, it increased in use following the debut of the 2002 American science fiction television series Firefly, which featured a spaceship named Serenity, and the 2005 movie sequel Serenity. The name might also have increased in use due to its similarity in sound to the popular name Sarah or because it ends in the letter y like other names that were popular in the 1990s.

== See also ==
- Serenity (actress), stage name of Sonya Elizabeth Lane (born 1969), American former pornographic actress, journalist, and animal rights advocate
