= Cyriacus =

Christian martyr, died 303

Saint Cyriacus
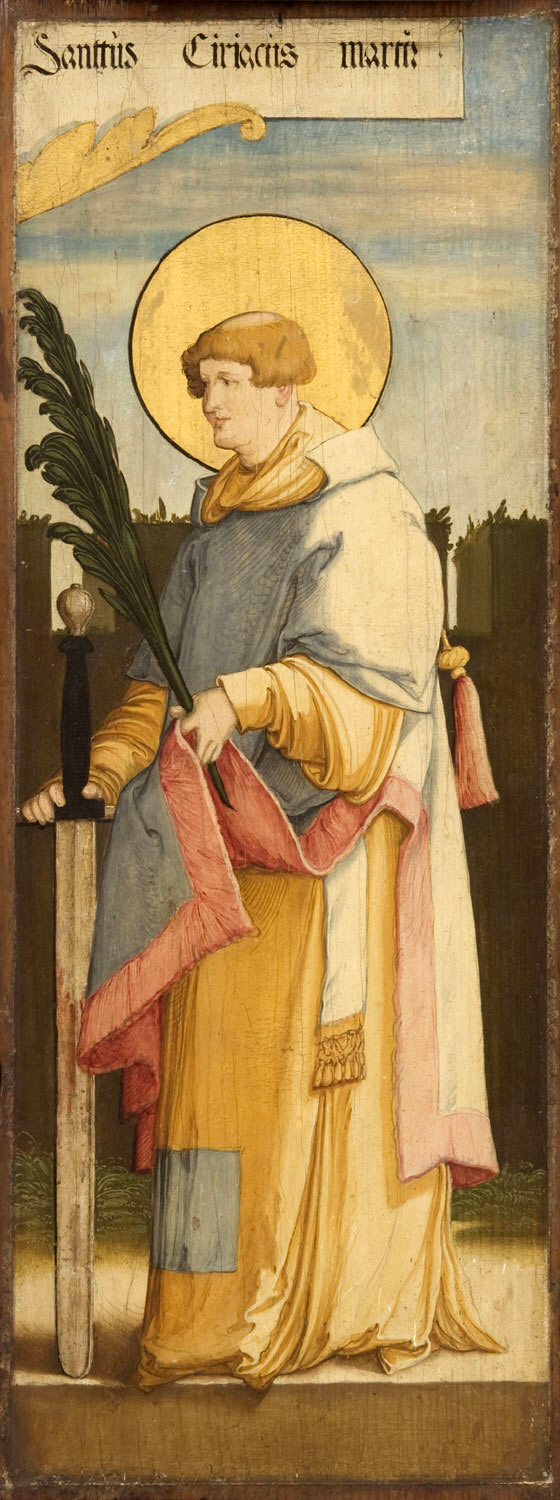
- Saint Cyriacus, by the Master of Meßkirch

Martyr, Holy Helper
- Born: 3rd century
- Died: 303
- Venerated in: Church of the East; Eastern Orthodox Churches; Oriental Orthodoxy; Catholic Church
- Canonized: Pre-Congregation
- Feast: 15 July (Church of the East); 7 June (Eastern Orthodox Church); 8 August (Catholic Church)
- Attributes: depicted as a deacon; book of exorcism; with Artemia
- Patronage: temptation on the deathbed; viticulture (in the Electorate of the Palatinate; Saint-Cierges, Switzerland; eye disease)

Cyriacus (Greek: Ἅγιος Κυριακός, romanized: Kyriakos, Syriac: ܩܘܪܝܩܘܣ, fl. 303 AD), sometimes Anglicized as Cyriac, according to Christian tradition, is a Christian martyr who was killed in the Diocletianic Persecution. He is one of twenty-seven saints, most of them martyrs, who bear this name, of whom only seven are honoured by a specific mention of their names in Roman Martyrology.

== Life ==
Of the Saint Cyriacus who, together with Saints Largus and Smaragdus and others (of whom Crescentianus, Memmia and Juliana are mentioned in the Roman Martyrology), is venerated on 8 August, all that is known with certainty, apart from their names and the fact of their martyrdom, is that they were buried at the seventh milestone of the Via Ostiensis on that date.

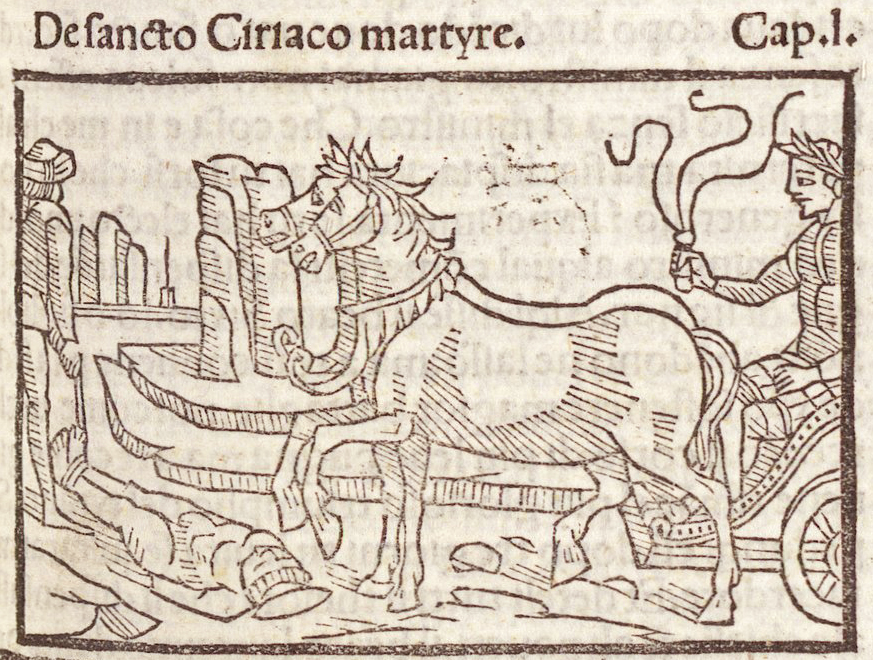
The Martyrdom of Cyriacus in the Golden Legend (1497)

However, legend has it that Cyriacus was a Roman nobleman who converted to Christianity as an adult and, renouncing his material wealth, gave it away to the poor. He spent the rest of his life ministering to the slaves who worked in the Baths of Diocletian. Under the reign of Western Roman Emperor Maximian, co-emperor with Diocletian, Cyriacus was tortured and put to death, beheaded in 303 on the Via Salaria, where he was subsequently buried. With him were martyred his companions Largus and Smaragdus, and twenty others, including Crescentianus, Sergius, Secundus, Alban, Victorianus, Faustinus, Felix, Sylvanus, and four women: Memmia, Juliana, Cyriacides, and Donata.

Saint Cyriacus is credited with exorcizing demons from two girls. The first was Artemisia (or Artemia), the daughter of Emperor Diocletian, which resulted in both Artemisia and her mother Serena of Rome converting to Christianity. The second was Jobias, the daughter of Shapur I of Persia (reigned 241–272), which led to the conversion of the King's entire household. However, this is impossible, because Shapur died thirty years before the reputed exorcism and because he had only one daughter named Adur-Anahid. It is possible that the girl reportedly exorcised was a daughter of Narseh (293–303) or of Hormizd II (303–309). It is more likely that many Bishops throughout the world have been named in honor of Saint Cyriacus at the Baths (of Diocletian).

== Veneration ==
The Tridentine calendar included the feast day of Cyriacus, Largus and Smaragdus on 8 August as a Semidouble. In 1955 this rank was lowered to that of Simple. The 1962 Calendar, issued together with Pope John XXIII's Roman Missal, the licit private and, under certain conditions, public use of which was authorized by the 2007 motu proprio Summorum Pontificum, reduced their celebration to a Commemoration. They are not included in the 1970 reformed Calendar of the Roman Rite liturgy, which was issued under the authority of Pope Paul VI, but, being included, all three, together with Memmia, Juliana and Smaragdus, in the Roman Martyrology, they are recognized saints of the Catholic Church.

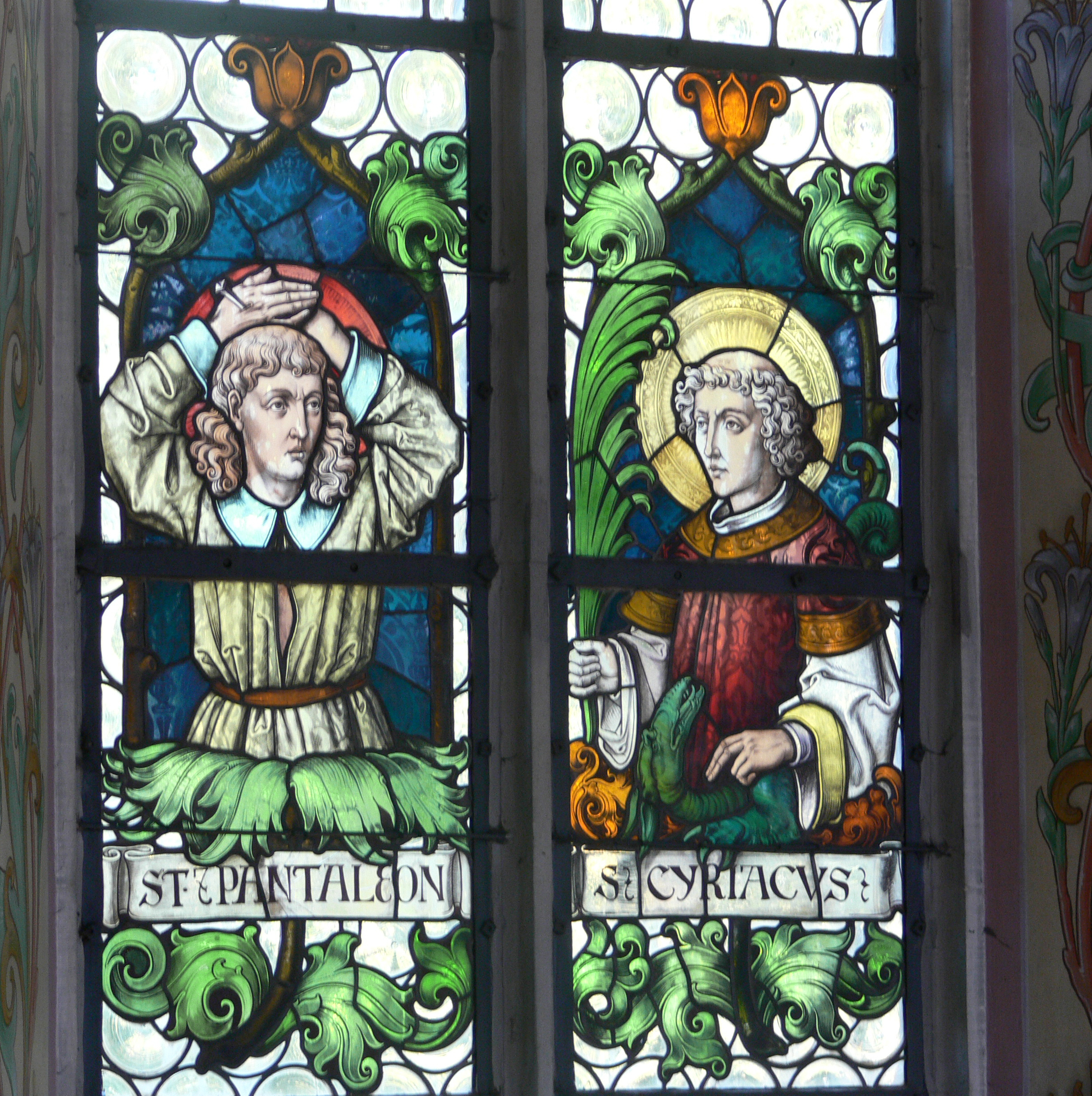
Stained-glass image of St Cyriacus (right). St Pantaleon is on the left. Weitnau

Saint Cyriacus is venerated as one of the Fourteen Holy Helpers.

It is claimed his relics were moved to Santa Maria in Via Lata in Rome, and the abbey of St Cyriaque in Altorf in Alsace.

The Church of "Saint Cyriacus in the Baths of Diocletian" (Latin: "Sanctus Ciriacus in Thermis Diocletiani"), was dedicated to this martyr, a former titulus church. The "tituli" were commonly named after their patron, often a lay patron in the early centuries: "Cyriac" in Greek signifies simply "patron." This "titulus," to which a cardinal was assigned, whatever its claimed second- or third-century origins, existed certainly in the fifth century, when Marcianus was cardinal priest of the title of S. Ciriaco alle Terme di Diocleziano in 494, at the time of Pope Gelasius I. The titulus was suppressed in 1477 by Pope Sixtus IV in favor of Saints Ciro and Giulitta. In 1493, Pope Alexander VI restored the name of S. Ciriaco. The title was definitively suppressed in 1587 by Pope Sixtus V, who assigned a titulus of Sts Quirico e Giulitta to Cardinal Ferdinando de' Medici. St Cyriacus is the patron saint of the Italian city of Cirié.

There were monasteries dedicated to St Cyriacus in the now destroyed Arab village of Majdal Yaba in Israel and the existing village of Al-Fasayil near Jericho. The residents of both these villages venerated him during the Byzantine era.

On St Cyriacus' feast day, 8 August 1899, a category four hurricane made landfall on the island of Puerto Rico and was named after him. It was known as the Hurricane San Ciriaco.

== See also ==
- 1899 San Ciriaco hurricane, named for its occurrence on Cyriacus's feast day
