= Galeria Valeria =

Roman empress from 305 to 311

- Augusta
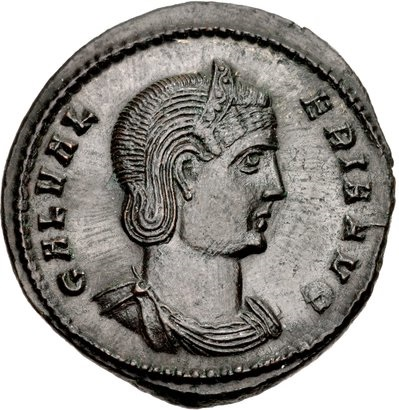
- Follis with Galeria's image

Roman empress
- Tenure: 305–311
- Born: Valeria
- Died: 315
- Spouse: Galerius
- Issue: Candidianus (adoption)
Names
- Galeria Valeria
Regnal name
- Galeria Valeria Augusta
- Father: Diocletian
- Mother: Prisca

Galeria Valeria (died 315) was the daughter of Roman Emperor Diocletian and wife of his co-emperor Galerius.

== Biography ==
Born to Diocletian and Prisca, she married Galerius in 293, when her father elevated him to the position of Caesar. This marriage was clearly organized to strengthen the bonds between the two emperors. Her name Valeria derives from her father's nomen gentilicium Valerius and the name Galeria might possibly be inherited from her mother. If so then it could indicate that her father picked Galerius as an heir because he was a relative of Valeria's mother.

Valeria was raised to the title of Augusta and Mater Castrorum in November 308. Since Galerius fathered no child with her, Valeria adopted her husband's illegitimate son, Candidianus, as her own. In her honor, Galerius renamed the province of Upper Pannonia Valeria, which he had improved by draining marshes and removing forests.

When Galerius died in 311, Licinius was entrusted with the care of Valeria and her mother Prisca. The two women, however, fled from Licinius to Maximinus Daza, whose daughter was betrothed to Candidianus. After a short time, Valeria refused the marriage proposal of Maximinus, who arrested and confined her in Syria and confiscated her properties. At the death of Maximinus, Licinius ordered the death of both women. Valeria and Prisca escaped and spent a year in hiding, until they were recognized by residents in Thessaloniki. They were captured by Licinius' soldiers, who beheaded them in the central square of the city and threw their bodies into the sea.

Valeria was sympathetic towards Christians, while Galerius persecuted them. She was canonized as a Christian saint with her mother (see Saint Alexandra).

== Gallery ==
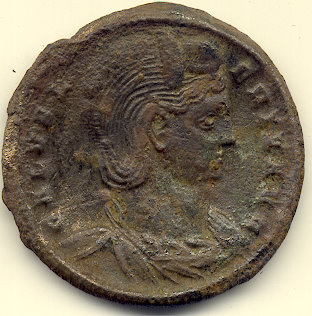
Galeria Valeria on a Roman coin

== See also ==
- Women in ancient Rome

== Sources ==
- Jones, A.H.M.; J.R. Martindale & J. Morris (1971). Prosopography of the Later Roman Empire. Vol. 1. Cambridge University Press. ISBN 0-521-07233-6.

Royal titles
Preceded by Prisca (wife of Diocletian)	Roman Empress; 305–311 with Flavia Maximiana Theodora (305–306); Valeria Maximilla (306–311); Fausta (307–311)	Succeeded by Fausta
Preceded by Eutropia (wife of Maximian)	Roman Empress; 305–311 with Flavia Maximiana Theodora (305–306); Valeria Maximilla (306–311); Fausta (307–311)	Succeeded by Fausta
