= Prisca (empress) =

Roman empress from 284 to 305

- Nobilissima Femina
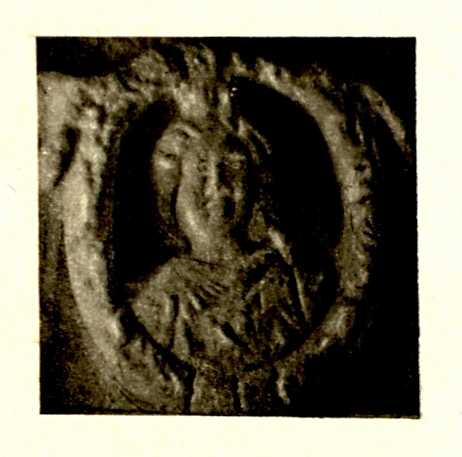
- Relief in the mausoleum of Diocletian's Palace in Split, believed to depict Prisca.

Roman empress
- Tenure: 284–305 (alongside Magnia Urbica 284–285 and Eutropia 286–305)
- Died: 315
- Spouse: Diocletian
- Issue: Galeria Valeria
- Religion: Uncertain, possibly Christian

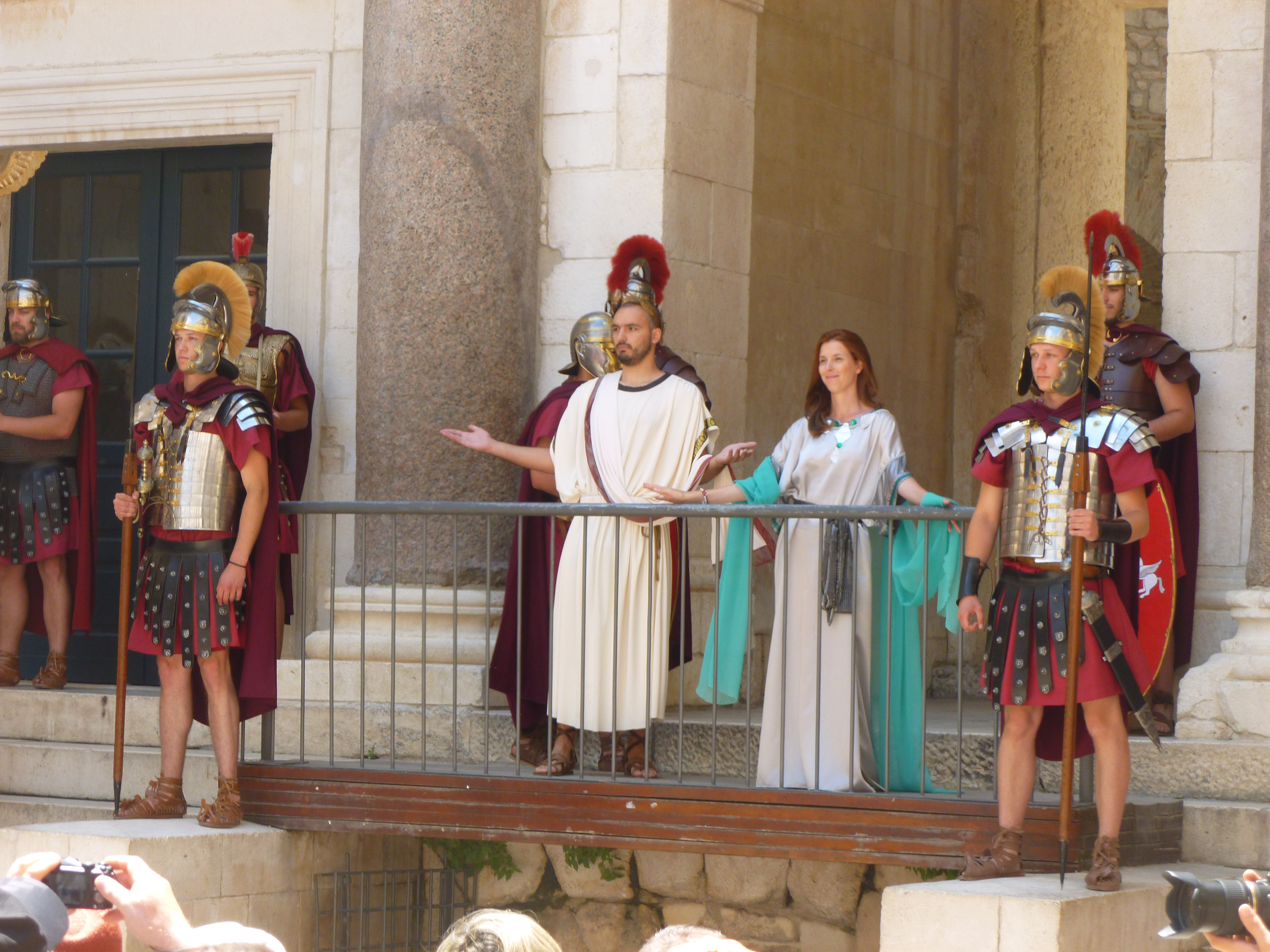
Historical reenactors at Diocletian's Palace; actors playing Diocletian and Prisca are at centre.

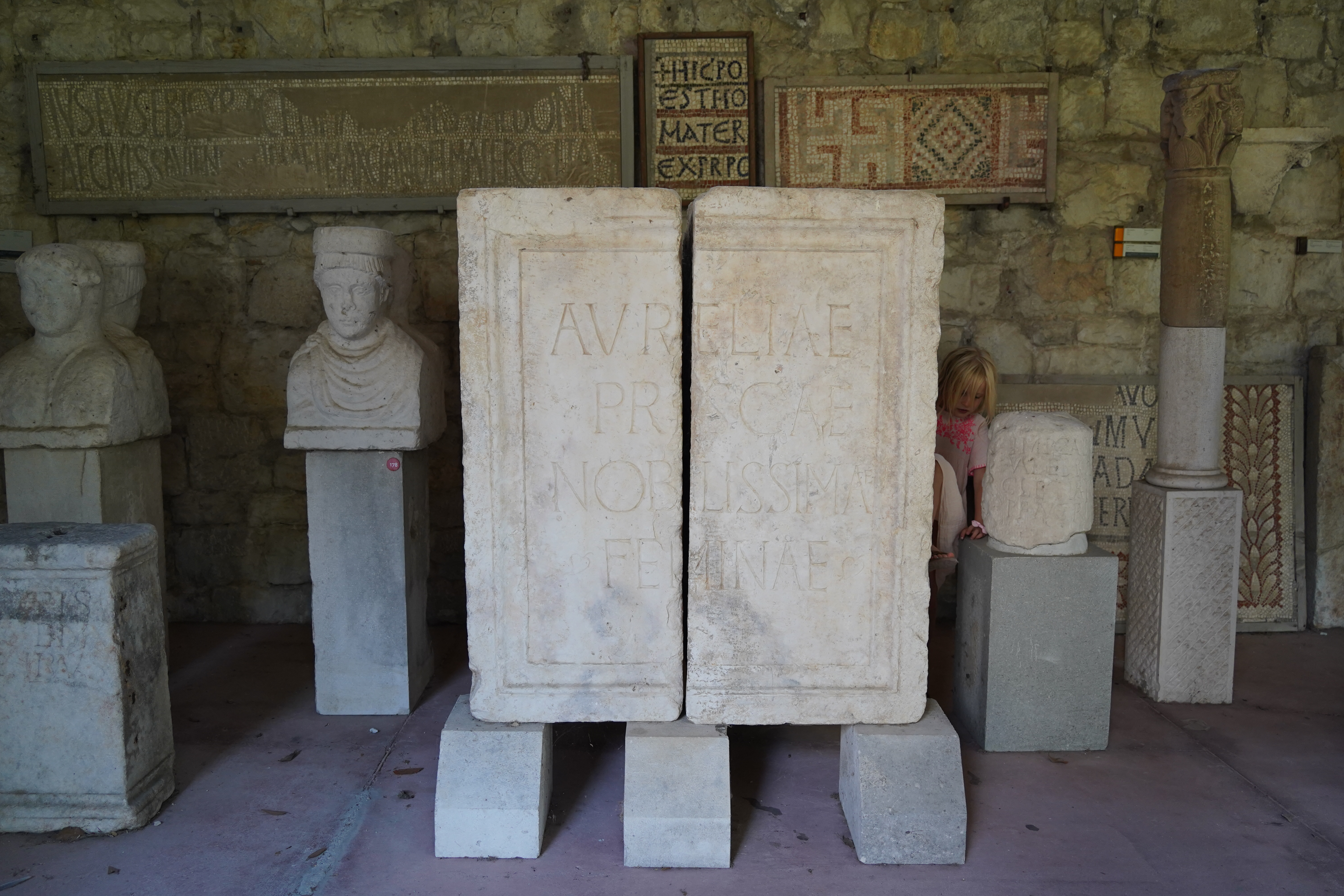
Spolium from a temple to Jupiter, giving Prisca's nomen and title ("most noble lady Aurelia Prisca").

Aurelia Prisca (died 315) was a Roman empress as the wife of the emperor Diocletian.

== Biography ==
Prisca was already married and had a daughter with Diocletian when he became emperor. She was not granted the title of Augusta or Caesarissa but instead Nobilissima Femina. Lothar Wickert proposed in 1974 based on her daughter Galeria Valeria's name that Prisca's nomen gentilicium may have been Galeria. He also theorized that her husband picked Galerius as a son-in-law and heir because he was related to Prisca. An inscription on a statue base at a temple to Jupiter in Salona gives her name as Aurelia Prisca. Byron Waldron has proposed that the name Aurelia might have been added to Prisca's name when Diocletian and his co-emperor Maximian exchanged their respective names "Valerius" and "Aurelius" with each other, to strengthen dynastic ties.

When her husband retired to Spalatum in 305, Prisca stayed with her daughter and son-in-law in Thessalonica. When Galerius died in 311, Licinius was entrusted with the care of Prisca and her daughter Valeria. The two women, however, fled from Licinius to Maximinus Daza. After a short time, Valeria refused the marriage proposal of Maximinus, who arrested and confined her in Syria and confiscated her properties. At the death of Maximinus, Licinius had Prisca and her daughter killed.

== Christianity ==
According to the Latin writer Lactantius, Prisca and her daughter Valeria were "forced to be polluted" by sacrificing to the Roman gods during the Great Persecution of 303. Lactantius is, perhaps, implying that Prisca and Valeria were Christian or favorably disposed to Christianity. In later antiquity two Christian saints, Serena of Rome and Saint Alexandra, became known in legends as Diocletian's wife.

== See also ==
- List of distinguished Roman women
  - List of Roman and Byzantine empresses
  - List of Augustae

== Sources ==
- Jones, A.H.M.; J.R. Martindale & J. Morris (1971). Prosopography of the Later Roman Empire. Vol. 1. Cambridge University Press. ISBN 0-521-07233-6.

Royal titles
Preceded by Magnia Urbica	Empress of Rome; 284–305 with Magnia Urbica (284–285); Eutropia (286–305)	Succeeded by Galeria Valeria (wife of Galerius)
Preceded by Magnia Urbica	Empress of Rome; 284–305 with Magnia Urbica (284–285); Eutropia (286–305)	Succeeded by Flavia Maximiana Theodora (wife of Constantius Chlorus)
