= Serena Daolio =

Italian singer (born 1972)

- Born: June 21, 1972 (age 53); Carpi, Emilia-Romagna
- Genres: Italian opera
- Occupation: operatic soprano
- Years active: 2001–present

Serena Daolio (born in Carpi, Emilia-Romagna on 21 June 1972) is an Italian soprano singer. She was awarded a diploma with the maximum number of votes at the Parma Conservatory under the direction of Donatella Saccardi. After that, she studied under Renata Scotto and Virginia Zeani. She stood out among the Puccinian roles most familiar to the public, as well as in the most famous Verdian roles.

== Biography ==
She performed for the first time in 2001 at the Teatro Bonci in Cesena in the role of Violetta Valery in La Traviata.
