= Serenus =

Serenus may refer to:

- Serenus of Alexandria (died c. 202), Christian martyr and saint in Roman Egypt
- Serenus Sammonicus (died 212), Roman scholar
- Serenus of Antinoöpolis (c. 300–c. 360), also known as Serenus of Antinoeia, Greek mathematician in Roman Egypt
- Serenus the Gardener, also known as Serenus of Sirmium, 4th century martyr, Roman Catholic and Eastern Orthodox saint
- Serenus, Jewish messiah claimant (c. 720)

== See also ==
- Serenicus (c. 620–c. 669), Italian Benedictine monk, monastery founder and Catholic saint
- Serenidus of Saulges (c. 600–c. 680), Italian Benedictine monk and Catholic saint, brother of Serenicus
