= Flavia Maximiana Theodora =

Roman empress from 305 to 306

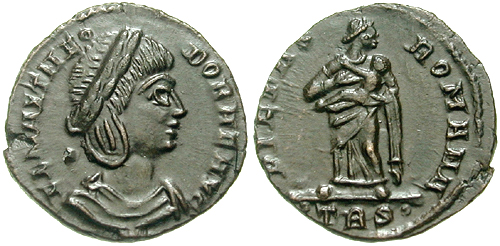
- Posthumous coin of Flavia Maximiana Theodora. On the reverse, the goddess Pietas is depicted.

Roman empress
- Tenure: 305–306
- Born: Maximiana Theodora
- Died: before 337
- Spouse: Constantius Chlorus
- Issue: Flavius Dalmatius; Julius Constantius; Hannibalianus; Anastasia; Flavia Julia Constantia; Eutropia
- Dynasty: Constantinian
- Father: Uncertain, perhaps Afranius Hannibalianus or Maximian
- Mother: Uncertain, perhaps Eutropia

Flavia Maximiana Theodora, known simply as Theodora (died before 337) was a Roman empress as the wife of Constantius Chlorus.

== Biography ==
=== Early life ===
She is often referred to as a stepdaughter of Emperor Maximian by ancient sources, leading to claims by historians Otto Seeck and Ernest Stein that she was born from an earlier marriage between Eutropia, wife of Maximian, and Afranius Hannibalianus. This man was consul in 292 and praetorian prefect under Diocletian.

Timothy Barnes challenges this view, arguing that all "stepdaughter sources" derive their information from the hypothetical 4th century Enmannsche Kaisergeschichte, which Barnes considers unreliable, while sources he considers to be more reliable refer to Theodora as Maximian's daughter, rather than his stepdaughter. He concludes that she was born to an earlier wife of Maximian, possibly one of Hannibalianus's daughters. Although Julia Hillner agreed with the idea of Theodora being Maximian's biological daughter, she also observed that Barnes' theory does not explain why one of Theodora's daughters was named Eutropia. She believes that Theodora was the daughter of both Maximian and Eutropia. She agrees with Barnes that the "stepdaughter sources" are the result of later Constantinian propaganda, but argues that Afranius was instead Eutropia's brother, thus explaining why Theodora named one of her daughter Eutropia, and one of her sons Hannibalianus. In contrast, Byron Waldron has argued that Theodora was indeed most likely Maximian's stepdaughter, as the recent redating of the Origo Constantini Imperatoris to the Early Middle Ages, if correct, indicates that every source that describes Theodora as a daughter post-dates the fourth century historical tradition that refers to her as a stepdaughter. In this reconstruction, the anonymous author of the Origo has adopted a passage from the Chronicle of Jerome, but through factual slippage has changed Jerome's 'stepdaughter' (priuigna) into 'daughter' (filia).

=== Marriage ===
In 293, Theodora married Constantius Chlorus, the junior co-emperor of Maximian, after he had set aside Helena, mother of his son Constantine, to strengthen his political position. The couple had six children. Through her son Julius Constantius, she would become the grandmother of the emperor Julian.

After the death of her stepson Constantine, several of her male descendants were massacred, which Julian explicitly blamed Constantius II for. Constantine's successors proceeded to mint coins of Theodora, presumably in an attempt to distance themselves from the massacre.

== Bibliography ==
- Barnes, Timothy D. (1982). The New Empire of Diocletian and Constantine. Cambridge, MA: Harvard University Press. doi:10.4159/harvard.9780674280670. ISBN 0-674-28066-0.
- Hillner, Julia (2023). Helena Augusta: Mother of the Empire. Oxford University Press. ISBN 978-0-19-087529-9.
- Martindale, John R.; Jones, A. H. M.; Morris, John, eds. (1971). The Prosopography of the Later Roman Empire: Volume I, AD 260–395. Cambridge: Cambridge University Press. ISBN 0-521-07233-6.
- Pohlsander, Hans A. (1993). "CONSTANTIA". Ancient Society. 24: 151–167. JSTOR 44079527.
- Waldron, Byron (2022). "Filia or Priuigna? On the Paternity of Theodora, Wife of Constantius I". Hermathena. 212: 97–107.
- Woods, David (2011). "Numismatic Evidence and the Succession to Constantine I". The Numismatic Chronicle. 171: 187–196. JSTOR 42667233.

Royal titles
Preceded by Prisca (wife of Diocletian)	Empress of Rome; 305–306 with Galeria Valeria (305–306)	Succeeded by Galeria Valeria
Preceded by Eutropia (wife of Maximian)	Empress of Rome; 305–306 with Galeria Valeria (305–306)	Succeeded by Galeria Valeria
