= Eutropia =

Roman empress from 286 to 305

- Possible portrait, Musée Saint-Raymond

Roman empress
- Tenure: 286–305
- Born: Syria
- Died: after 325
- Spouse: Maximian
- Issue: Theodora; Maxentius; Fausta

Eutropia (Greek: Εύτροπία; died after 325) was a Roman empress of Syrian origin, the wife of Emperor Maximian.

== Personal life ==
In the late 3rd century she married Maximian, though the exact date of this marriage is unknown. They had at least two children: Maxentius, Roman emperor from 306 to 312, and Fausta, the wife of Constantine the Great and mother of emperors Constantine II, Constantius II, and Constans.

The parentage of Theodora, the wife of Constantius I, is disputed; most sources refer to her as Maximian's stepdaughter, leading to the belief that she was born from Eutropia's previous marriage to a man named Afranius Hannibalianus, since Theodora named one of her own sons Hannibalianus. Timothy Barnes, however, considers the few sources that refer to Theodora as Maximian's daughter to be more reliable, and suggests she was born from Maximian's previous marriage to a hypothetical daughter of Afranius, which would make Theodora Eutropia's stepdaughter instead. Julia Hillner agrees with Barnes that the stepdaughter sources are a result of political propaganda from the later Constantinian dynasty, but believes that his reading fails to explain why Theodora named one of her daughters Eutropia if her mother was an unknown Afrania instead of empress Eutropia. Hillner argues that Afranius Hannibalianus was Eutropia's brother, and that Theodora was the daughter of both Maximian and Eutropia. This is in line with John Vanderspoel.

== Footnotes ==
Royal titles
Preceded by Prisca	Empress of Rome; 286–305 with Prisca (286–305)	Succeeded by Galeria Valeria (wife of Galerius)
Preceded by Prisca	Empress of Rome; 286–305 with Prisca (286–305)	Succeeded by Flavia Maximiana Theodora (wife of Constantius Chlorus)
Preceded by Cornelia Salonina	Empress-Mother of Rome; 306–312	Succeeded by Marina Severa
