= Serena Ivaldi =

Italian roboticist

- Born: Italy
- Education: University of Genoa; Istituto Italiano di Tecnologia
- Occupations: Roboticist, inventor
- Known for: Exo Turn powered exoskeleton

Serena Ivaldi is a robotics researcher specializing in human-robot interaction.

== Life and work ==
Born in Italy, Ivaldi's interest in robots began when she read the science fiction books of Isaac Asimov. She earned her master's degree in automatic control and robotics at the University of Genoa, before completing her PhD at the Robotics, Brain and Cognitive Science Lab of the Istituto Italiano di Tecnologia also in Genoa. In 2011, she left Italy for Paris to start her first post-doc at the Institute of Intelligent Systems and Robotics at the Pierre and Marie-Curie University, which became the Sorbonne University in 2017.

In May 2014, Ivaldi joined the IAS group at Darmstadt University of Technology in Germany for a second post-doc in the CoDyCo project. In November 2014, she became a research fellow at the French Institute for Research in Computer Science and Automation in Nancy, France. She then joined the LARSEN project in 2014 at 34 years of age, as a specialist in human-robot interaction. She took part in the European HEAP and H2020 "AnDy" projects. The ANDY project's goal was to improve the ability of collaborative robots (called CoBots) to work easily with people in environments both industrial and domestic to reduce the risk of injury to humans.

At the time of the COVID-19 pandemic in France, at the end of March 2020, she co-created with Nicla Settembre (Centre Hospitalier Régional et Universitaire de Nancy, INSERM and Université de Lorraine) the Exo Turn project, designed to validate the use of an exoskeleton to turn over patients in their intensive care beds and give caregivers relief with this physical task that causes significant strain on the lumbar region of those who do the heavy lifting. During the pandemic, patients were turned over up to eight times a day to help with breathing. Laevo exoskeletons were tested by 60 caregivers and then used with patients; other experiments were completed for other hospital applications. This was the first known use of exoskeletons in a hospital intensive care unit.

== Honors and awards ==
Ivaldi received the Suzanne Zivi Award in 2020 for research excellence.

Since 2021, she has been editor-in-chief of the International Journal of Social Robotics. She is a former associate editor for IEEE Robotics and Automation Letters (2017–2021).
