= Flavia Maxima Fausta =

Roman empress from 307 to 326

Fausta
- Augusta
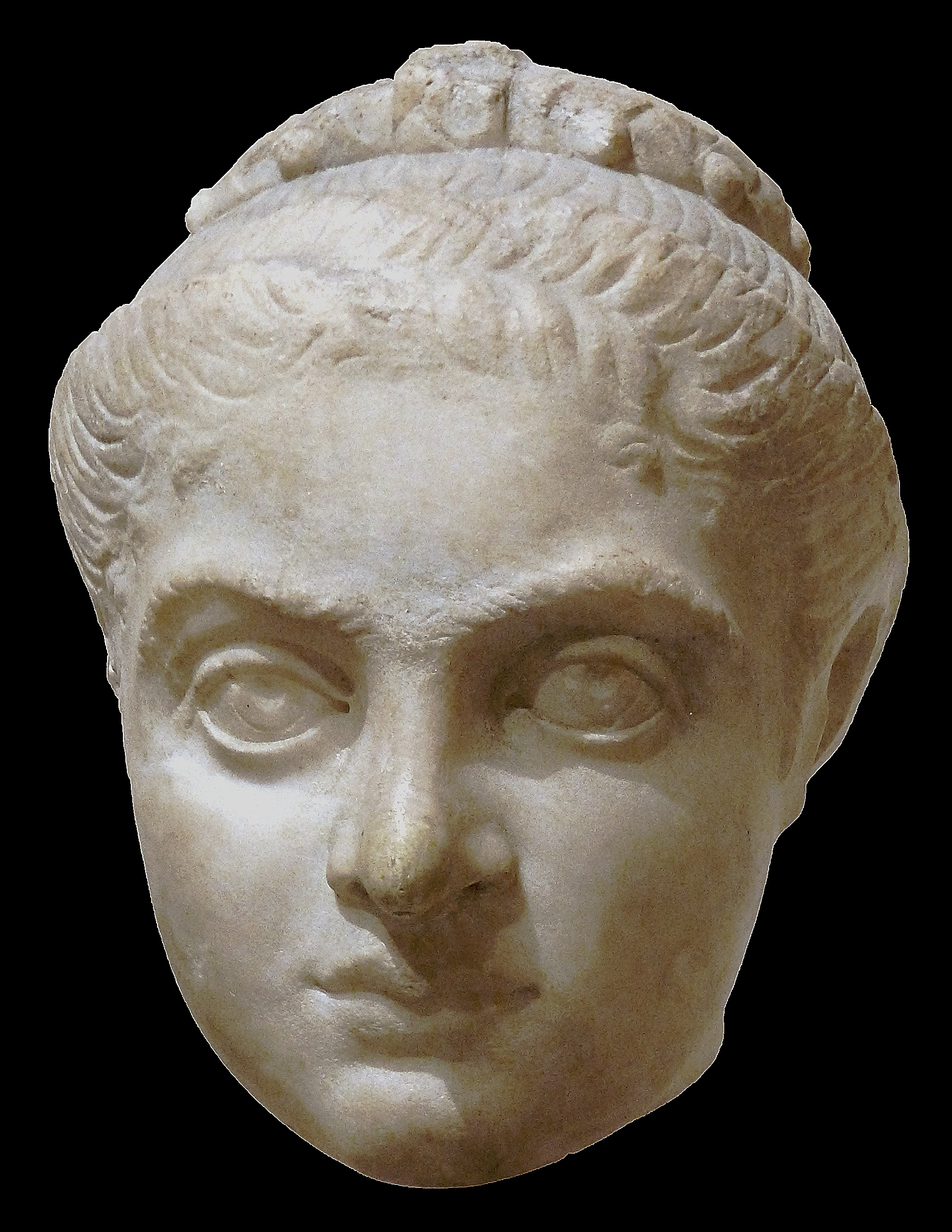
- Possible portrait of Fausta, Louvre

Roman empress
- Tenure: 307–326
- Born: c. 289; Rome, Roman Empire
- Died: 326
- Spouse: Constantine I
- Issue: Constantina; Constantine II; Constantius II; Constans; Helena
Names
- Flavia Maxima Fausta
- Dynasty: Constantinian
- Father: Maximian
- Mother: Eutropia

Flavia Maxima Fausta Augusta (Note: She received the honorific Augusta in 324 AD.) (c. 289 – 326 AD) was a Roman empress. She was the daughter of Maximian and second wife of Constantine the Great, who had her executed and excluded from all official accounts for unknown reasons. Historians Zosimus and Zonaras reported that she was executed for adultery with her stepson, Crispus.

== Family ==
Fausta was the daughter of the emperor Maximian and his wife Eutropia. As her age is nowhere outright attested, scholarly estimates of her date of birth have ranged from 289/290 to the end of the 290s. To seal the alliance between them for control of the Tetrarchy, Maximian married her to Constantine I in 307.

Constantine at first tried to present Maximian's suicide as an unfortunate tragedy, but later started spreading another version where Fausta was involved in her father's downfall. Barnes observed that the story "shows clear signs of being invented during Constantine's war against Maxentius."

During her marriage, she had 5 children. Fausta held the title of nobilissima femina up until 324, when Constantine held her in high enough regard to grant her the title of augusta, which she received together with Constantine's mother Helena.

== Execution ==
In 326, Fausta was put to death by Constantine, following the execution of Crispus, his eldest son by Minervina. The circumstances surrounding the two deaths were unclear. Various explanations have been suggested; in one, Fausta is set against Crispus, as in the anonymous Epitome de Caesaribus, or conversely her adultery, perhaps with the stepson who was close to her in age, is suggested.

According to the Latin Epitome de Caesaribus and the Ecclesiastical History of Philostorgius (as epitomized by Photius), Fausta was executed by being locked in a bath which was over heated, in connection with the death of Crispus, which "people [thought]" was caused by Fausta's accusation of unclear nature.

But Constantine, having obtained rule over the whole Roman Empire by remarkable success in wars, ordered his son Crispus to be put to death, at the behest (so people think) of his wife Fausta. Later he locked his wife Fausta in overheated baths and killed her, because his mother Helena blamed him out of excessive grief for her grandson.

Zosimus, on the other hand, suggests adultery as the reason:

He killed Crispus, who had been deemed worthy of the rank of Caesar, as I have said before, when he incurred suspicion of having sexual relations with his stepmother Fausta, without taking any notice of the laws of nature. Constantine's mother Helena was distressed at such a grievous event and refused to tolerate the murder of the young man. As if to soothe her [feelings] Constantine tried to remedy the evil with a greater evil: having ordered baths to be heated above the normal level, he deposited Fausta in them and brought her out when she was dead.

In Zonaras' version written in the 12th century, Crispus' death was caused by Fausta's retaliatory accusation of rape following her unsuccessful sexual advances toward him. But when Constantine realized his innocence, he punished her, mirroring the myth of Phaedra and Hippolytus. Scholars have noted that if Crispus was found to be innocent, his condemnation of memory should have been lifted, but it was not.

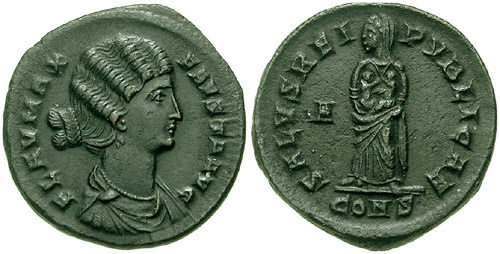
Fausta, as Salus, holding her two sons, Constantine II and Constantius II

Constantine I ordered the damnatio memoriae of Fausta and Crispus around 326 with the result that no contemporary source records details of her fate. Although Julian praised Fausta in his panegyric to Constantius II, there is no other evidence of her memory being rehabilitated.

== In popular culture ==
Fausta is an important antagonist in Dorothy L. Sayers' chronicle-play The Emperor Constantine (1951). In addition, Fausta was portrayed by Belinda Lee in the film Constantine and the Cross (1961).

== Bibliography ==
- Barnes, T. D. (7 December 1973). "Lactantius and Constantine". The Journal of Roman Studies. 63: 29–46. doi:10.2307/299163. JSTOR 299163. S2CID 163051414.
- Barnes, Timothy D. (1982). The New Empire of Diocletian and Constantine. Cambridge, MA: Harvard University Press. doi:10.4159/harvard.9780674280670. ISBN 0-674-28066-0.
- Drijvers, Jan Willem (1992). "Flavia Maxima Fausta: Some Remarks". Historia. 41 (4): 500–506. JSTOR 4436264.
- Pohlsander, Hans A. (1996). The Emperor Constantine. Routledge. ISBN 0-415-31938-2.
- Stephenson, Paul (2010). Constantine: Unconquered Emperor, Christian Victor. London, Quercus. ISBN 978-1-4683-0300-1.
- Waldron, Byron (2022). Dynastic Politics in the Age of Diocletian, AD 284-311. Edinburgh University Press. ISBN 9781474498654.
- Woods, David (1998). "On the Death of the Empress Fausta". Greece & Rome. 45 (1): 70–86. doi:10.1093/gr/45.1.70.

Royal titles
Preceded by Galeria Valeria (or Minervina)	Empress of Rome; 307–326 with Galeria Valeria (307–311); Valeria Maximilla (307–312); Flavia Julia Constantia (313–324)	Succeeded by Daughter of Julius Constantius
