= Alexandra of Rome =

Eastern Orthodox saint

Saint Alexandra of Rome
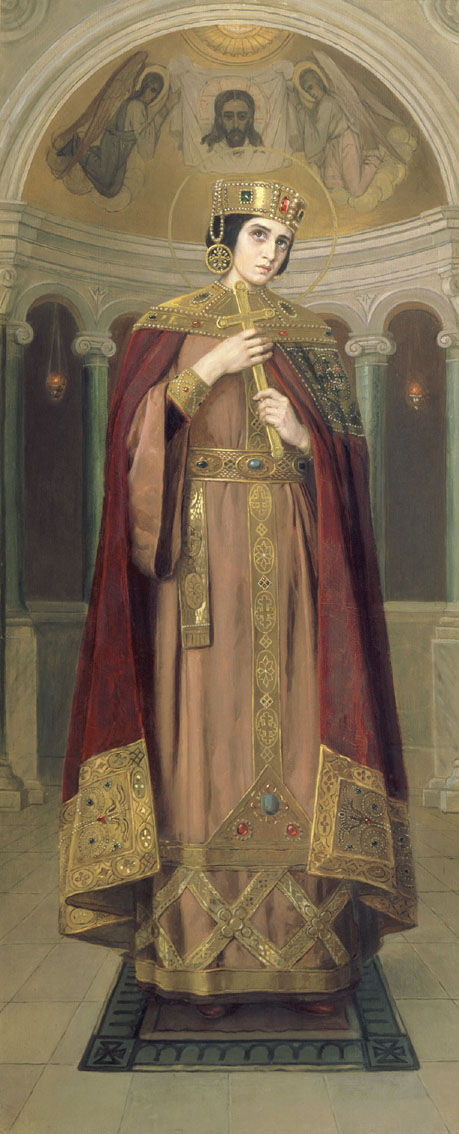
- by Nikolai Bodarevsky

Martyr
- Died: 314; Nicomedia
- Venerated in: Eastern Orthodox Church; Roman Catholic Church; Oriental Orthodox Churches
- Feast: April 21 (Eastern Orthodox) March 20 (Roman Catholic) April 8 (Oriental Orthodox)
- Attributes: crown

Alexandra of Rome (Greek: Ἀλεξάνδρα) was a Christian martyr and saint, known from Martyrdom of Saint George as either Emperor Diocletian's wife or the wife of Dacian, a Roman Prefect. She is also sometimes mistaken with Priscilla or Prisca.

== Life ==
According to Frederick George Holweck, Saint Alexandra was the reputed wife of Emperor Diocletian and secretly converted to Christianity. Jacobus de Voragine listing her name as “Alexandria” describes her as the wife of Dacian, the Roman Prefect who persecuted Saint Caprasius of Agen and Saint Maginus. While Saint George was being tortured, Alexandra went to the arena, bowed before him, and professed her faith openly. When she questioned whether she was worthy of paradise and martyrdom without being baptized, Saint George told her, “Do not fear, for your blood will baptize you.” She was denounced as a Christian and imprisoned on her husband's orders in Nicomedia, then sentenced to death.

Her husband was so outraged by her conversion that he is said to have uttered, “What! Even thou hast fallen under their spell!”. Alexandra quietly accepted her sentence and prayed as the guards walked her to the place of execution. She asked if she could rest for a moment. The guards allowed this. She rested by the place of Saint George's execution at Nicomedia's City Wall.

Her three servants Apollo, Isaac, and Codratus went to prison with her; the first two died of starvation while the last was beheaded with her on April 21, 314. Her feast day is usually celebrated on April 21 and occasionally on April 23, when she is commemorated at the same time along with the soldier martyrs Anatolios and Protoleon and the 630 others who were martyred for professing faith while witnessing George's martyrdom. The Coptic Church venerates her on April 8, and the Catholic Church Venerates her on March 20.

She is sometimes confused with Prisca. De Voragine presents her story as legendary but not outright fiction. Holweck believes that it is all fictitious and that she never existed.

== See also ==
- Prisca (empress) — wife of Emperor Diocletian.
- Serena of Rome - Christian saint known in legends as Diocletian's wife
