= Valeria Maximilla =

Roman empress from 306 to 312

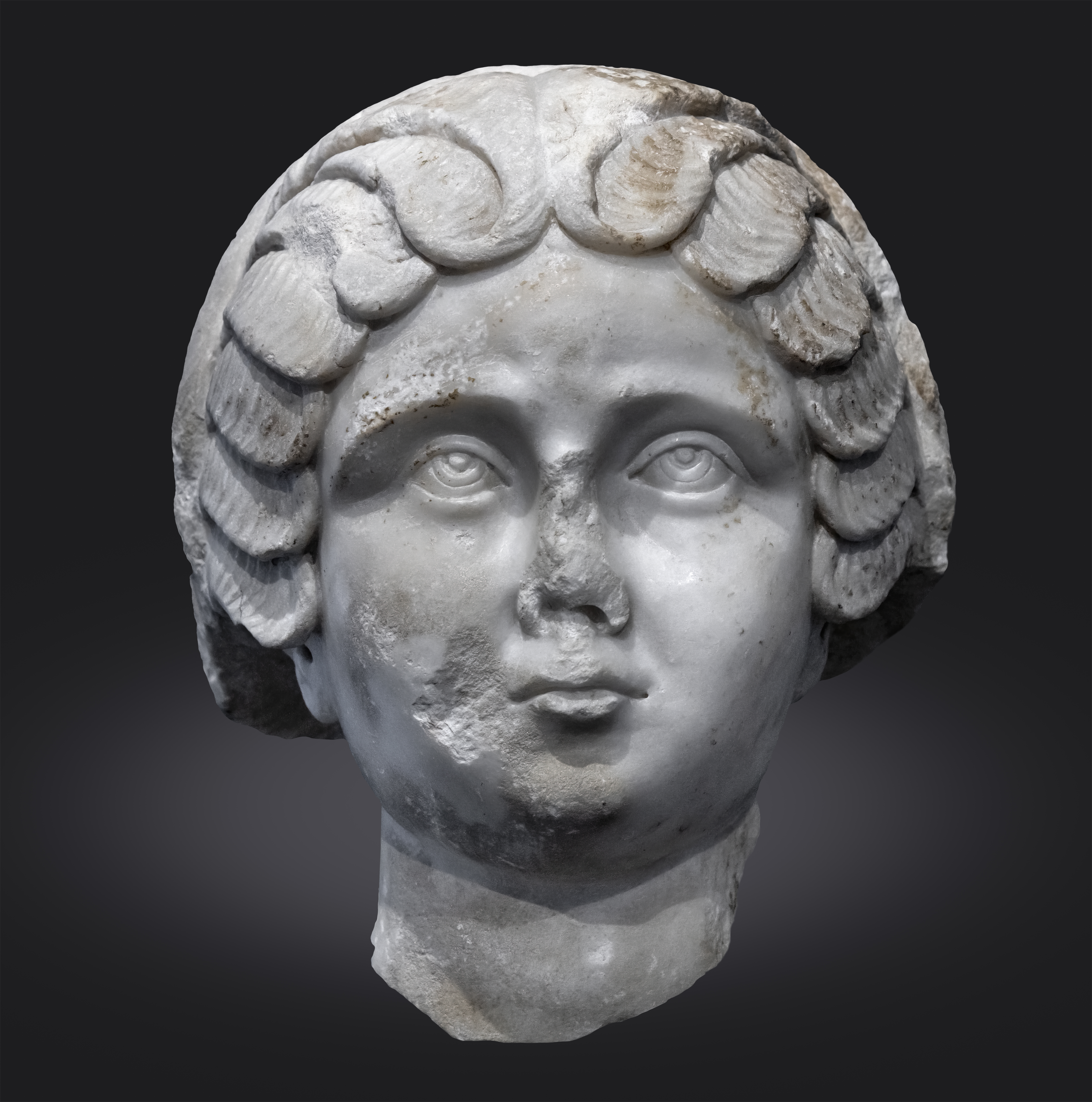
- Possible portrait, Musée Saint-Raymond.

Empress of the Roman Empire
- Tenure: 306–312 (alongside Galeria Valeria 307–311, Fausta 309–312)
- Born: before 293
- Died: after 312
- Spouse: Maxentius
- Issue: Valerius Romulus; unknown second son
- Father: Emperor Galerius

Valeria Maximilla (fl. 293–312) was a Roman Empress and wife of Emperor Maxentius.

== Life ==
Maximilla was the daughter of Emperor Galerius and his first wife, whose name is unknown. Around 293 (the exact date is unknown), she married Maxentius, son of Emperor Maximian, in what was likely an attempt to forge an alliance between the families of Maximian and Galerius. They had two sons. The eldest, Valerius Romulus, died in 309; the other son's name is not recorded, but might be Aurelius Valerius, who was executed in 312. As an emperor's daughter, she was entitled nobilissima femina.

Maxentius was acclaimed emperor in October 306 against the wishes of Maximilla's father, who unsuccessfully tried to overthrow the usurper in 307. Maxentius remained the ruler of Rome, Italy, and Africa until 312, when Constantine I invaded Italy. Valeria and her husband were together before his defeat at the Battle of the Milvian Bridge, after which she disappears from the historical record. Her fate is unknown.

Valeria Maximilla's portrait does not appear on any of the coinage issued under Maxentius, but she may have been depicted on a defaced sculpture now housed in the Capitoline Museums. If it is of Maximilla, it was likely defaced after her husband's overthrow, when his own images were also defaced.

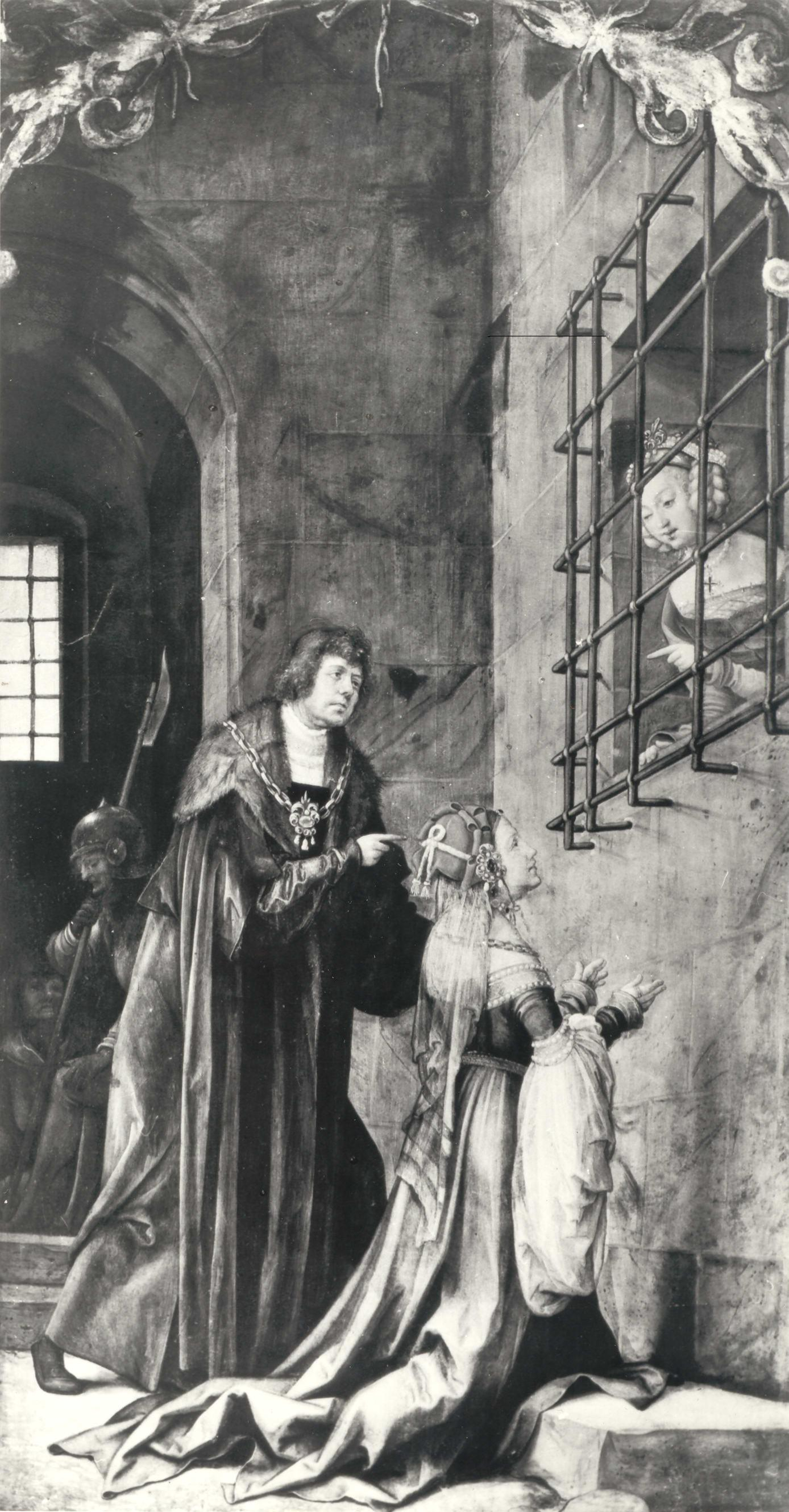
Empress "Faustina" visiting St. Catherine

== In St. Catherine's hagiography ==
Maximilla may be the nameless queen who appears in the hagiography of St. Catherine of Alexandria by Jacobus de Voragine (one of the fantastic stories in the "Golden Legend"). In this story, the queen converted to Christianity after meeting with Catherine, and the both of them were then tortured and executed by Maxentius, depicted here as a persecutor of Christians.

In another similar version by 15th-century Italian hagiographer Petrus de Natalibus, the queen was named "Faustina". She was accompanied to Catherine's jail by Porphyrius, an army captain. Along with Faustina, the captain and 200 of his soldiers also converted, and they were all supposedly martyred by Maxentius. In Eastern Orthodox churches, Faustina, Porphyrius (called a stratelates) and the soldiers share a feast day with Catherine: November 24 for the Russian Orthodox Church, and Nov. 25 for the Greek Orthodox Church.

== See also ==
- List of Roman women
- List of Roman empresses

Royal titles
Preceded by Galeria Valeria	Empress of Rome; 306–312 with Galeria Valeria (307–311); Fausta (309–312)	Succeeded by Fausta
