= Serena of Rome =

Legendary Roman saint and martyr

Saint Serena of Rome

martyr
- Born: Mid-third century
- Died: Late-third century
- Venerated in: Roman Catholic Church
- Beatified: Pre-Congregation, Roman Empire
- Feast: August 16

Serena of Rome is a legendary third-century martyr and saint listed in the Martyrologium Romanum. She is listed as the wife of Diocletian, however that claim is unproven and she has been removed from the calendar of saints.

== Background ==
The previous Martyrologium Romanum placed her feast day on August 16, and stated that she was the wife of Diocletian.

Tradition has it that Serena was Diocletian's first wife, before he reached his highest office. A convinced and conscious Christian, when her husband learned of her faith, he repudiated her, perhaps fearing that the presence of a Christian at his side would jeopardize his political career. This may have led to her martyrdom.

However, Serena's existence is considered doubtful. In De mortibus persecutorum, Lactantius states that Prisca and Valeria were the wife and daughter of Diocletian.

The Monks of Ramsgate wrote in their Book of Saints (1921),

Described as the wife of the Emperor Diocletian, and as secretly a Christian. She certainly sought as far as was in her power to mitigate the lot of the Christians. After her death they venerated her as a saint. The little we know of her comes from the Acts of Susanna, V.M. and from those of Pope St. Caius (A.D. 283-296).

According to tradition about Saints Marcellus and Susanna, Serena defended the Christians against the persecutions under her husband. She was cast out and suffered martyrdom.

In the legend of Cyriacus, he is credited with exorcizing demons from two girls, one of whom was Artemisia (or Artemia), the daughter of Diocletian, which resulted in both Artemisia and her mother Serena converting to Christianity.

According some sources, Serena did not die a martyr, but instead spent her days in exile in Magliano Sabina, in the Italian region of Lazio. She is the patroness saint of Foglia (Magliano Sabina) and the Chapel of Saint Serena in Schizzanello is dedicated to her.

She is not mentioned in the current martyrology due to her legendary nature.

== See also ==
- Alexandra of Rome
- Prisca

== Bibliography ==
- St. Augustine's Abbey, Ramsgate (1921). The Book of saints : a dictionary of servants of God canonized by the Catholic Church. London: A. & C. Black, ltd. OCLC 671676136. This article incorporates text from this source, which is in the public domain.
- Lapidge, Michael (2018). The Roman Martyrs. Introduction, Translations, and Commentary. Oxford.
- Cirignano, Florindo (2018). "San Ciriaco. Un santo tra storia, leggenda e arte" (in Italian). ISBN 978-88-95742-50-2.
