= 285 =

285 in various calendars
- Gregorian calendar: 285; CCLXXXV
- Ab urbe condita: 1038
- Assyrian calendar: 5035
- Balinese saka calendar: 206–207
- Bengali calendar: −309 – −308
- Berber calendar: 1235
- Buddhist calendar: 829
- Burmese calendar: −353
- Byzantine calendar: 5793–5794
- Chinese calendar: 甲辰年 (Wood Dragon); 2982 or 2775 — to — 乙巳年 (Wood Snake); 2983 or 2776
- Coptic calendar: 1–2
- Discordian calendar: 1451
- Ethiopian calendar: 277–278
- Hebrew calendar: 4045–4046
- Hindu calendars
- Vikram Samvat: 341–342
- Shaka Samvat: 206–207
- Kali Yuga: 3385–3386
- Holocene calendar: 10285
- Iranian calendar: 337 BP – 336 BP
- Islamic calendar: 347 BH – 346 BH
- Javanese calendar: 165–166
- Julian calendar: 285; CCLXXXV
- Korean calendar: 2618
- Minguo calendar: 1627 before ROC 民前1627年
- Nanakshahi calendar: −1183
- Seleucid era: 596/597 AG
- Thai solar calendar: 827–828
- Tibetan calendar: ཤིང་ཕོ་འབྲུག་ལོ་ (male Wood-Dragon); 411 or 30 or −742 — to — ཤིང་མོ་སྦྲུལ་ལོ་ (female Wood-Snake); 412 or 31 or −741

The year 285 (CCLXXXV) was a common year starting on Thursday of the Julian calendar. In the Roman Empire, it was known as the "Year of the Consulship of Carinus and Aurelius" (or, less frequently, "year 1038 Ab urbe condita"). The denomination 285 for this year has been used since the early medieval period, when the Anno Domini calendar era became the prevalent method in Europe for naming years.

== Events ==
=== By place ===
==== Roman Empire ====
- Spring – Emperor Carinus marches from Britain to northern Italy, and defeats the army of usurper Sabinus Julianus at Verona.
- Summer – Battle of the Margus: Emperor Diocletian defeats the forces of Carinus in the valley of the Margus (Serbia). Numerous soldiers desert Carinus during the battle. Carinus then flees to the Pannonian fort of Cornacum, but he is soon slain by his officers.
- July 21 or July 25 – Diocletian appoints his fellow-officer Maximian to the office of caesar, or junior co-emperor.
- Carausius, naval commander at Bononia (modern-day Boulogne), is given the task of clearing the English Channel of Frankish and Saxon pirates.
- Maximian is sent to pacify Gaul, where the Bagaudae, a band of peasants, are revolting against the Roman Empire.

== Deaths ==
- Marcus Aurelius Carinus, Roman consul and emperor
- Du Yu (or Yuankai), Chinese general and politician (b. 222)
- Sabinus Julianus, Roman usurper (approximate date)
