= Marcus Aurelius (name) =

Marcus Aurelius was a name used by men from the Roman Empire and afterwards. The earliest so called was the emperor Marcus Aurelius. It became widely spread following the Constitutio Antoniniana issued by emperor Caracalla in 212.

== Ancient Rome ==
=== Roman emperors ===
- Marcus Aurelius Antoninus, or simply Marcus Aurelius, emperor from AD 161 to 180
- Marcus Aurelius Commodus Antoninus, emperor from 177 to 192
- Marcus Aurelius Antoninus, nicknamed Caracalla, emperor from 198 to 217
- Marcus Aurelius Antoninus, nicknamed Elagabalus, emperor from 218 to 222
- Marcus Aurelius Severus Alexander, emperor from 222 to 235
- Marcus Aurelius Claudius "Gothicus", emperor from 268 to 270
- Marcus Aurelius Claudius Quintillus, emperor in 270
- Marcus Aurelius Probus, emperor from 276 to 282
- Marcus Aurelius Carus, emperor from 282 to 283
- Marcus Aurelius Carinus, emperor from 283 to 285
- Marcus Aurelius Numerianus, or Numerian, emperor from 283 to 284
- Marcus Aurelius Valerius Maximianus, or Maximian, emperor from 286 to 305
- Marcus Aurelius Valerius Maxentius, emperor from 306 to 312

=== Other Romans ===
- Marcus Aurelius Cleander, freedman of Emperor Commodus
- Marcus Aurelius Verrianus, prefect of Roman Egypt in 188
- Marcus Aurelius Heraclitus, prefect of Roman Egypt in 215
- Marcus Aurelius Epagatus, prefect of Roman Egypt in 224
- Marcus Aurelius Zeno Januarius, prefect of Roman Egypt in 231
- Marcus Aurelius Marius, Gallic emperor in 269
- Marcus Aurelius Nigrinianus (anglicised Nigrinian), probably son of Emperor Carinus
- Marcus Aurelius Sabinus Julianus, Roman usurper against emperor Carinus or Maximian
- Marcus Aurelius Olympius Nemesianus, esteemed poet during the reign of the emperor Carus
- Marcus Aurelius Valerius Romulus, son of the emperor Maxentius
- Magnus Aurelius Cassiodorus Senator, formerly recorded as Marcus Aurelius Cassiodorus, Roman statesman and writer

== People in other countries ==
- Marcus Aurelius Arnheiter (1925−2009), U.S. Navy officer
- Marcus Aurelius Roberto (1930−1986), member of the Ohio General Assembly

== See also ==
- Aurelius (disambiguation)
- Aurelia (disambiguation)
