= Lucius Caesonius Ovinius Manlius Rufinianus Bassus =

Suffect consul of the Roman Empire
- Incumbent
- Assumed office AD 284
- Monarch: Diocletian
- Preceded by: Marcus Aurelius Numerianus Augustus
- Succeeded by: Marcus Aurelius Carinus Augustus III; Titus Claudius Aurelius Aristobulus

Suffect consul of the Roman Empire
- Incumbent
- Assumed office c. AD 260

Urban Prefect of Rome
- Incumbent
- Assumed office mid-AD 285

Proconsul of Africa
- Incumbent
- Assumed office c. AD 275

Personal details
- Born: c. AD 227
- Died: c. AD 300
- Children: Caesonius Bassus (probable); Caesonia Manilia (speculated)
- Parent: Lucius Caesonius Lucillus Macer Rufinianus (father)

Lucius Caesonius Ovinius Manlius Rufinianus Bassus (c. AD 227 – c. AD 300) was a Roman military officer and senator who was appointed suffect consul twice, in around AD 260 and 284.

== Biography ==
Much of the detailed knowledge of Rufinianus Bassus's career comes from epigraphic evidence, particularly an inscription on a statue base found in Aversa (Campania). The statue was dedicated to him by a freedman (libertus) named Caesonius Achilleus (AE 1964, 223). Rufinianus Bassus was the son of Lucius Caesonius Lucillus Macer Rufinianus and a member of the 3rd century Patrician gens Caesonia. Although Bassus had a lengthy and illustrious career, most of the posts he held are not easily dateable. It is conjectured that his career began around AD 240–245, either in the reign of Gordian III or Philip the Arab, with his posting as a Triumvir capitalis (prison manager), and this was followed with his posting as sevir turmae deducendae (commander of one of the six squadrons of equites, who had the responsibility for organizing and financially running the city's games). He was then the imperial candidate for the posts of Quaestor and Praetor.

His propraetorial career was relatively brief, with firstly an appointment as curator rei publicae of the town of Beneventum, followed by the curatorship of the town of Lavinium. Both these posts were probably occupied sometime during the 250s. Then in around AD 260, Rufinianus Bassus was chosen as consul suffectus, and by this time he had survived the many imperial crises which had plagued Rome throughout the early 250s.

Rufinianus Bassus’ proconsular career began with his appointment as Curator Albei Tiberis et cluacarum sacrae urbis (the official responsible for maintaining Rome's sewers), a position which both his father and grandfather had held before him. This was probably followed by his being chosen to be Legatus proconsulis Africae dioeceseos Carthaginiensis (or the deputy governor of the province of Africa responsible for the area around Roman Carthage). This was followed by (or perhaps was held at the same time) his appointment as Curator of Colonia Carthaginensium.

Next was his appointment as Proconsular governor of Africa, which Rufinianus Bassus held possibly around AD 275. An inscription mentions that the African posts were held for three years, but it is unclear whether he was proconsular governor for three years, or whether his three African posts together amounted to three years. Given that the holding of this office for more than one year was extremely rare, it seems likely that he held the governorship for a single year only. Then between 276 and 282 he was appointed by the emperor Probus as presidendum iudicio magno (probably the magistrate presiding over a court of appeal at Rome). Next, probably at some point during the same period, Probus appointed him a judge, acting on behalf of the emperor in hearing cases concerning the money owed to the imperial treasury, as well as financial cases between private individuals, firstly in Rome (c. AD 276–281), and later in Africa (c. AD 281–282) - judex sacrarum cognitionum vice caesaris sine appellationem cognoscendi inter fiscum et privatus, item inter privatos Roma et in provincia Africa.

Possibly during the reigns of Carinus and Numerian, Rufinianus Bassus was made a comes Augustorum, or companion, of the emperors (c. 284). Then in late AD 284, he was made suffect consul for a second time. This was most unusual, as since the early 2nd century, all second consulships were ordinary consulships. However, since virtually all of the consules ordinarii between AD 283 and 285 were held by the emperors themselves, this left no room for any non-imperial candidates, which may account for this unusual situation. Then probably in the middle of AD 285, Rufinianus Bassus was appointed Praefectus urbi of Rome, possibly replacing another Urban Prefect partway through his term.

During his career, Rufinianus Bassus was made Salius Palatinus, followed by pontifex to Sol Invictus, and finally, Pontifex Maior. He also carried out one further role which cannot be defined or dated with any certainty. Labelled pr[. . .]ones tracto Piceno, it has been conjectured that it may have been praefectus annones (responsible for the corn crop), praefectus adversus latrones (against brigands), or even praefectus ad tirones (to select recruits).

== Family ==
Rufinianus Bassus was probably the father of Caesonius Bassus, who was consul in AD 317. It has also been speculated that he had a daughter, Caesonia Manilia, who married Amnius Anicius Julianus, consul in AD 322.

== See also ==
- Ovinia gens - Manlia gens - Rufinia gens

== Sources ==
- L'Année épigraphique (AE), 1964, 223.
- Bagnall, Roger S., Cameron, Alan, Consuls of the Later Roman Empire (1987)
- Jones, A. H. M.; Martindale, J. R.; Morris, J, The Prosopography of the Later Roman Empire, Vol. I, AD 260-395 (1971), pgs. 156-157
- Mennen, Inge, Power and Status in the Roman Empire, AD 193-284 (2011)
- Settipani, Christian, Continuité gentilice et Continuité familiale dans les familles sénatoriales romaines à l'époque impériale (2000)

Political offices
Preceded by Uncertain	Consul suffectus of the Roman Empire circa AD 260	Succeeded by Uncertain
Preceded by Marcus Aurelius Numerianus Augustus	Consul suffectus of the Roman Empire; 284 with Gaius Aurelius Valerius Diocletianus Augustus	Succeeded by Marcus Aurelius Carinus Augustus III (contested by Gaius Aurelius Valerius Diocletianus Augustus II); Titus Claudius Aurelius Aristobulus
