= Julian of Pannonia =

- Usurper(s) of the Roman Empire
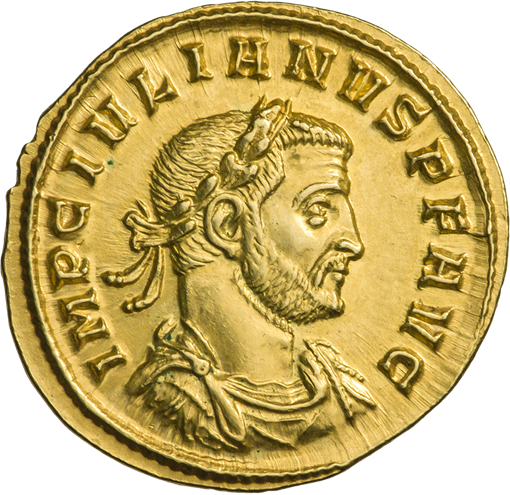
- Aureus of Julian minted c. 284
- Reign: 283–285 or 286, against Carinus or Maximian
- Died: 285 or 286; Italy or Africa Province
Names
- Marcus Aurelius Sabinus Julianus
Regnal name
- Imperator Caesar Marcus Aurelius Sabinus Julianus Augustus

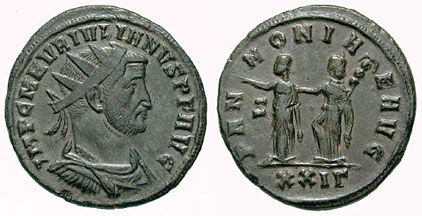
Antoninianus of Julian, celebrating the two provinces of Pannonia.

Marcus Aurelius Sabinus Julianus, known in English as Julian of Pannonia (died 285–286) was a Roman usurper (283–285 or 286) against Emperor Carinus or Maximian. It is possible that up to four usurpers with a similar name rebelled in a timeframe of a decade, but at least one of them is known by numismatic evidence.

== Usurper against Carinus (283–285) ==
Julian was a corrector in northern Italy, in 283/284, (and not a praetorian prefect as stated by some sources). Soon after the news of the death of Emperor Carus (in 283) or Numerian (in November 284) arrived in the western provinces, Julian revolted in Pannonia. He issued coins from Siscia, some of them bearing a legend celebrating Pannonia. Emperor Carinus, brother of Numerian, who had marched from Roman Britain to deal with the usurpation, met, defeated, and killed Julian early in 285, in Italy (possibly in Verona), or in Illyricum.

== Other usurpers ==
According to some scholars, it is possible that two usurpers actually existed: a Marcus Aurelius Julianus, corrector in Italy, rebelled after Carus' death, with the control of Pannonia, and defeated in Illyricum; and a Sabinus Julianus, praetorian prefect, usurper in Italy after Numerian's death, defeated near Verona.

Another usurper, simply named Julian, raised some turmoil in Africa Province, against Carinus, with the support of the Quinquegentani tribe.

A fourth Julian is mentioned revolting between the time Maximian had been raised to the rank of Augustus (1 March 286) and the time Constantius Chlorus and Galerius became Caesar (March 1, 293). The revolt of this Julianus took place in Italy, but ended when, during a siege, a breach was opened in the walls of his city, and he threw himself in the fire.
