= Magnia Urbica =

Roman empress from 283 to 285

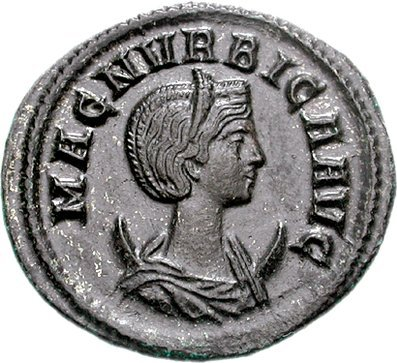
Antoninianus of Magnia Urbica.

Magnia Urbica was the wife of the Roman Emperor Carinus. She was granted the honorifics Augusta and Mater castrorum, senatus ac patriae ("Mother of the (Military) camp, Senate and Fatherland"). She and Carinus may have been the parents of Nigrinian.

Royal titles
Vacant Interregnum (275–283) Last known title holder: Ulpia Severina	Empress of Rome; 283–285	Succeeded by Prisca
