= Curator Aquarum =

Roman official who managed the water supply of Rome

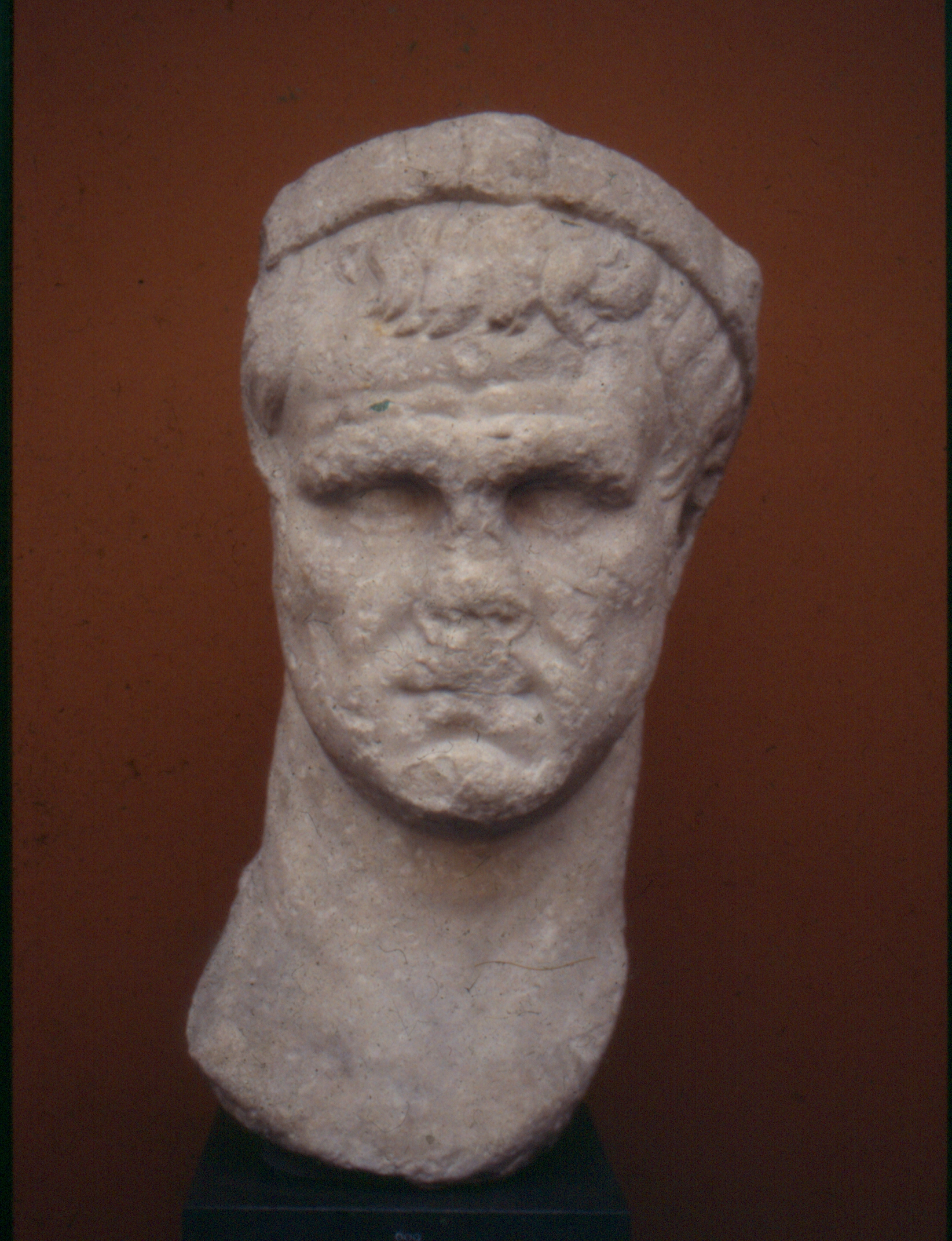
Marcus Agrippa, the first person to become Curator Aquarum.

The Curator Aquarum was a Roman official responsible for managing Rome's water supply and distributing free grain. Curators were appointed by the emperor. The first curator was Agrippa. Another notable Curator Aquarum was Frontinus, a Roman engineer.

== History ==
Before the Curator Aquarum Censors managed the water supply. Emperor Augustus, as part of an initiative to develop new positions, established the position of Curator Aquarum. The purpose of this office was to maintain the water supply of Rome. Augustus appointed Agrippa as the first Curator Aquarum. Agrippa was curator from 33 to 12 BC. He used a slave force consisting of 240 imperial slaves and 40 freedmen. During his term, he built the Aqua Julia, repaired existing aqueducts, and established the Cura Aquarum. After the death of Agrippa, Messala Corvinus became the Curator Aquarum. Emperor Claudius increased the number of the staff to 460 men. Eventually this would increase to 700 men. Frontinus was also appointed as the Curator Aquarum by emperor Nerva. During the 2nd Century the Curator Aquarum largely escaped the historical record. However, during the reigns of Septimius Severus and Caracalla a new position called Curator Aquarum et Minuciae was established. Lucius Novius Rufius, who was the Governor of Hispania Citerior and a supporter of Clodius Albinus, a rival of Septimius Severus, held the position of Curator Aquarum et Minuciae.

== Roles and Powers ==
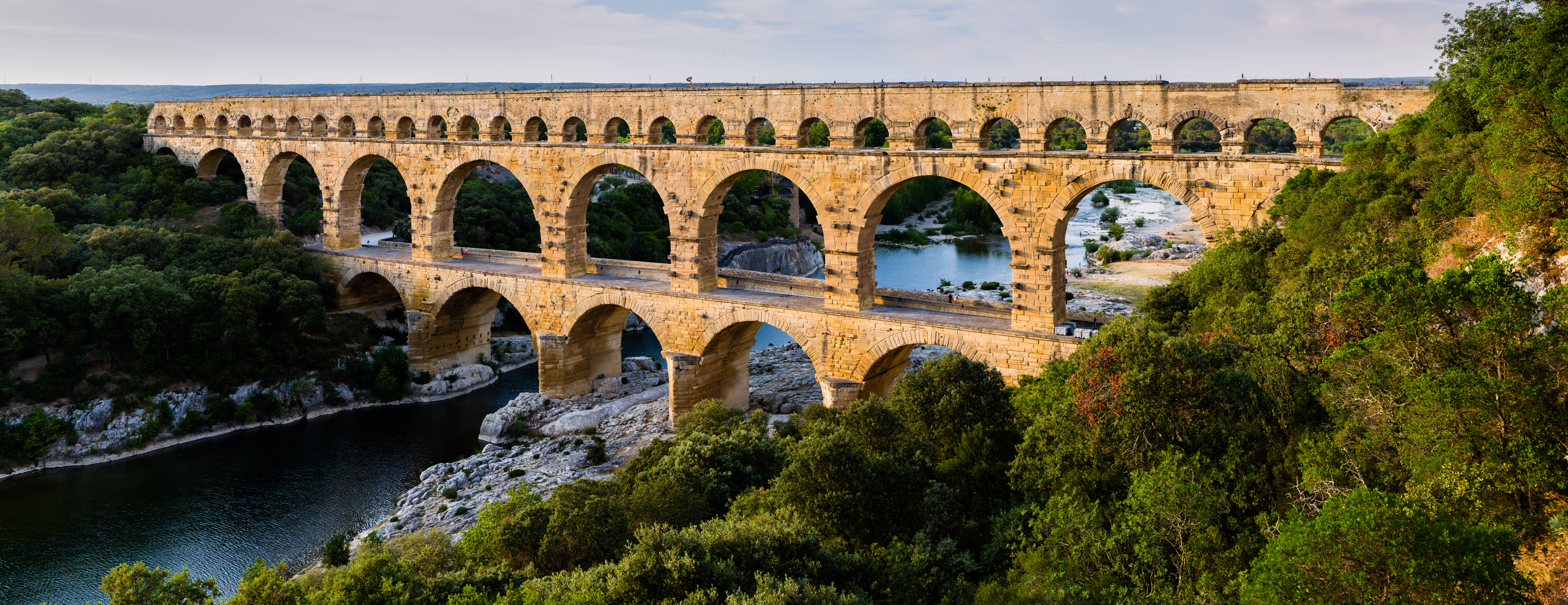
The Pont du Gard, a Roman aqueduct. The Curator Aquarum would have managed aqueducts such as this one.

The Curator Aquarum was generally a prominent Senator of Consular rank. Officially, they were chosen by the Senate, although unofficially the emperor always installed them. Curatores Aquarum, and their two Senatorial adiutores, or assistants, held mostly ceremonial power. They were officially given complete control over the Roman water supply and aqueducts. Despite this, no technical knowledge was expected of the curator, they were not even present in Rome for much of their term.

The curator's subordinates were workers with knowledge of hydraulics such as engineers, pavers, plasterers, and aquarii. These workers would usually make all the decisions. Although the curator still managed the salary of these workers. Curatores Aquarum had the responsibility of ensuring a constant stream of water, they could have been called to clear aqueducts, they would have fined offenders who damaged the Aqueducts, they managed the trials of people who were accused of damaging aqueducts or sewers, they would have managed the construction of new buildings and public works, and they could set up new Castella for water grants. To gain access to the city's water, an epistula would have to be presented to the Curator Aquarum. The curator would pass the letter onto the procurator, who would implement the request.

In Ancient Rome, free grain would be distributed to the plebeians at the Campus Martius which was by the Porticus Mincuia. It is possible that the Curator Aquarum was responsible for the distribution. However, the Curator Aquarum may have only been responsible for using water to power a mill which made the grain. Other scholars contest this point of view. As the Aqua Traiana was created after the first Curatores Aquarum et Minuciae was elected. Curatores Aquarum had the right to travel with two Lictors, but only whilst outside the city of Rome. Curatores Aquarum were entitled to the toga praetexta and the sella curulis.

=== Procurates Aquarum ===
Procurates Aquarum, were Roman procurators that managed the water supply. These procurator's names appear on many inscriptions in the sub cura formula, indicating an official role. However, there are a large quantity of these names. Indicating that they could not all have been procurators. Most likely, they were officials responsible for supervising public works involving the installation of a water conduit.

== List of Known People who have been Curator Aquarum ==
Name	Term	Appointer	Source
Agrippa	33-12 BCE	Augustus	
Messala Corvinus	12 BCE-13 CE	Augustus	
Ateius Capito	13-22 CE	Augustus	
Tarius Rufius	23-24 CE	Tiberius	
Marcus Cocceius Nerva	24-33 CE	Tiberius	
Gaius Octavius Laenas	33-37 CE	Tiberius	
Marcus Porcius Cato	38 CE	Tiberius	
Unknown	38-46 CE	Tiberius	
Aulus Didius Gallus	46-49 CE	Tiberius	
Gnaeus Domitius Afer	49-60 CE	Tiberius	
Lucius Calpurnius Piso	60-63 CE	Nero	
Petronius Turpilianus	64-66 CE	Nero	
Vibius Crispus	66-68 CE	Nero	
Pompeius Silvanus	71-73 CE	Vespasian	
Lucius Tampius Flavianus	73 CE	Vespasian	
Manius Acilius Aviola	74 CE	Vespasian	
Sextus Julius Frontinus	97 CE	Nerva	
Lucius Valerius Messalla Thrasea Priscus	198 CE	Septimius Severus	
Lucius Valerius Poplicola Balbinus Maximus	Unknown	Gallienus	
Gaius Caesonius Macer Rufinianus	203-213 CE	Caracalla	
Lucius Caesonius Lucillus Macer Rufinianus	230-235 CE	Alexander Severus	
Gaius Annius Anullinus	295	Diocletian	
