= Aper (praetorian prefect) =

Ancient Roman politician

- Born: Unknown
- Died: 284; Nicomedia (modern Izmit, Turkey)
- Other names: Lucius Flavius Aper, Arrius Aper
- Occupations: Professional soldier, Provincial governor, Praetorian prefect
- Known for: Serving as Praetorian prefect under Emperor Carus, involvement in the military and governmental reforms of the Roman Empire
- Title: Praetorian Prefect

Aper (possibly Lucius Flavius Aper, died 284) was a Roman citizen of the third century AD. First known to history as a professional soldier, he went on to serve as an acting provincial governor and finally became Praetorian prefect, under the Emperor Carus. This rendered him hugely influential in the government of the empire - not excepting in matters of peace and war.

Aper's career coincided with and benefited from the momentous changes in the structure of the Roman army and the Roman state introduced in the middle years of the third century that brought men such as himself - i.e. members of the Roman equestrian order with a strong military background - to the fore in the public administration. Almost certainly he would have been a man of considerable ability.

However, as was almost invariably the case with those who rose to the highest levels in the Imperial Service, the main element that fuelled Aper's rise to the highest levels was his access to powerful military and political patronage. In his case, this derived from his relationship with Carus, which began when they were both serving soldiers and not only survived but even flourished after Carus's accession to the principate, by which time he was already the father-in-law of Carus's son, the future emperor Numerian. On the death of Carus, an event quickly followed by the demise of Numerian, this essential prop to Aper's position was gone. Almost immediately, bad luck and bad judgement brought him into competition for primacy with Diocles, commander of the Domestici and future Emperor Diocletian. This was to have rapid and fatal consequences, not only for Aper's career, but for his very life.

== Background ==
Nothing is known of Aper's origins or the date and circumstances of his birth.

The praenomen and nomen with which Aper is associated (i.e. 'Lucius' and 'Flavius' respectively) are known only from an epigraph commemorating a man named Aper from Poetovio - see below. The epigraph honorand is generally held by modern historians to be identified with the Aper here considered. If the latter's nomen was indeed 'Flavius', it may be remarked that he shared it with the future emperor, Constantius Chlorus. However, no familial relationship between the two men has ever been established.

Aper's cognomen (i.e. 'Aper') translates into English as 'wild boar'. Again, is not known whether this was a diacritic associated with that branch of the Flavian clan to which Aper is thought to have belonged or whether it was a nickname derived from some personal characteristic of the man himself.

The nomen "Arrius" sometimes used for Aper was proposed by 14th-century proto-humanist Giovanni de Matociis after a reading of the Historia Augusta, but is generally not accepted by modern scholars and the name is not included in sholarly editions of the Augustan History since 1864.

== Career ==
=== Early appointments ===
Aper is identified with the Aper who was commemorated on the epigraph dated 267-8 found at Poetovio, in Pannonia Superior (now Ptuj, Slovenia). The inscription describes Aper as a vir egregius (Note: The honorific vir egregius (i.e. 'Chosen Man') shows that Aper was at that time an equestrian of the third grade.) praepositus (Note: The term praepositus - lit. a 'man-put-before', a commander of soldiers - represents a command-function rather than a specific military rank. It was denoted a man men commanding ad hoc unit, usually one brigaded within a composite expeditionary forces (such as an imperial field-army), as opposed to one of the regular military formations that made up the forces that traditionally defended the imperial frontiers. For a discussion of the use of the term in the later third century, see R.E. Smith, passim.) legionum V Macedonicae atque XIII Geminae. Poetovio was an important fortress on the River Drava which controlled the approaches to Italy through the Julian Alps (Note: In the 260s the legions V Macedonica and XIII Gemina were still based in Dacia. However, in the early 250s, detachments of those units were sent south of the Danube where it is assumed that they became part of the composite expeditionary force commanded the emperor Gallienus. These vexillationes of the Dacian legions had been at that time commanded by Lucius Petronius Taurus Volusianus. Volusianus, too, had had the title praepositus.) It cannot be determined whether Aper commanded the fortress garrison or whether he answered to a superior officer who would probably have been styled as a dux (Note: Earlier in the 260s Publius Aelius Aelianus had commanded the garrison of Poetovio as a dux. However, the force at his disposal had been larger than that led by Aper at the end of the decade consisting of vexillationes of the four legions of the Pannonian provinces.) The force under Aper's command would have consisted of elements (i.e. vexillationes) of the legions mentioned rather than the legions themselves. There is no known instance of a praepositus commanding a full legionary establishment, let alone two.

The increasing use of composite formations such as that under Aper was a phenomenon of the mid-third century. Such units were independent of the regular command-structures of the frontier garrisons as traditionally deployed reflecting the strategic reaction of the imperial government to the anarchic situation in the Danube provinces (and also, incidentally, in Mesopotamia and Syria) caused by incessant incursions by northern barbarians (and the forces of the Persian Empire) into Roman territory and savage civil conflicts which were in large measure a consequence of the failure of the imperial government to control such incursions. The traditional deployment of the army in the pre-emptive defense of the frontiers had largely broken down by the 250s in the face of these threats. The new strategy which relied on ad hoc mobile expeditionary forces brought about a great expansion of the command-opportunities for officers of equestrian as opposed to senatorial rank. These were for the most part professional soldiers who had achieved their equestrian status by rising through the ranks of the legionary centurionate.

Aper is also identified with the officer commemorated on an undated epigraph from Aquincum in Pannonia Inferior (modern Budapest, Hungary). There he is shown as a vir egregius agens vices praesidis. (Note: By the late-260s the term praeses had largely displaced legatus as the title used for the office of provincial governor. It was used for equestrians and senatorials indifferently.) (Note: The formula vir egregius agens vice praesidis defines an 'equestrian acting in the place of a (senatorial) governor'. It was presumably devised to give legal cover to the appointments of equestrians to senatorial posts while leaving the constitutional principal, i.e. that these were offices reserved for senators, unchallenged.) This wording indicates that, while his equestrian social status remained the same, Aper was now acting governor of Pannonia Inferior. (Note: At this time Pannonia Inferior was still a praetorian province (i.e. one normally requiring a senatorial governor, a legatus pro praetore - see Petersen, op. cit., passim. Pannonia Inferior's status as a praetorian province was not to change for some years after Aper's appointment. This is suggested by another epigraph which commemorates a governor of senatorial status, probably shortly before 283. In other words it was some years after Aper's term in this post for by 283 Aper had become Praetorian Prefect - see below.) There is no way of knowing the specific circumstances that had led the Imperial Authorities to give Aper this posting, but the most likely reason was that the local situation required a man with military experience and that no suitable senatorial could be found. As in the case of Aper's earlier appointment in Poetovio, the prevailing disorder made this a problem that increasingly confronted the Imperial government and that, increasingly, the solution was to appoint an equestrian officer pro temp. By 283 it had been possible to find a senator able/willing to do the job in Pannonia Inferior. However, the problem of finding suitable senators to govern devastated provinces was still endemic and under Diocletian's regime the process of making the government of provinces a largely equestrian function was carried to its logical conclusion.

=== Apogée and downfall ===
At the outset of the reign of the Emperor Numerian (284) a man named Aper (already en poste as Praetorian Prefect. The Vita Cari also says that he was the father of Numerian's wife. It is probable that this Aper was the same man as the one already noted as praepositus of a detached force and as the former equestrian vice praeses of Pannonia. However, he is thought to have been prefect during the war with Persia initiated by Numerian's father, Carus and he had probably been given that office at the outset of Carus's reign in 282.

Aper is considered likely to have been the unnamed prefect who is said in the Vita Cari to have urged Carus to make war on Persia, hoping that Carus and Numerian would perish and he himself obtain the Purple. It is thus insinuated, but not directly asserted, that he was responsible for the death of both men during and after that campaign. The usual caveats are suggested regarding information based on the Augustan History. Historian Pat Southern, points to Aper's scheming as the most likely reason for Carus's unexpected death while campaigning against the Sasanian Empire.

What is incontestable is that when Numerian (who was by that time the Emperor following the death of his father) died as the Imperial comitatus returned from its victorious campaign in Persia. The traditional story is that Aper hid the body in a closed litter, told everyone that the emperor was irritated by the dust and light during the retreat, and issued orders in the emperor's name until the scent of the rotting corpse exposed his scheme.

Aper was accused of his murder by the army and put on trial at Nicomedia (Izmit, Turkey). The suspicion of murder evidently arose because Aper had attempted to conceal the fact of Numerian's death, perhaps while he prepared the ground for his own accession to the Purple. Diocles, commander of the Domestici, then gave early proof of his capacity for ruthless and decisive action (that was to later distinguish him as Emperor) by pronouncing Aper the murderer and executing him on the spot by plunging his sword into his breast, thus giving him no chance to justify himself—or, perhaps, to implicate Diocles in Numerian's demise. (Note: According to SHA, i.e. the author of the Augustan History, his grandfather once told him - ('entertaining but quite possibly mendacious SHA anecdote alert'(!) - that, when the future emperor Diocletian was still known as Diocles and making his way as a professional soldier serving in Gaul, tavern-woman who was also a druidess prophesied that he would accede to the empire '... once he had killed his boar ...' - i.e. Diocletiani manu esset Aper occisus;. Even if this account is not dismissed out of hand as yet another SHA concoction, it is still impossible to determine whether the prophesy was indeed delivered before Diocles murdered Aper and was hailed as emperor by the imperial field- army as a consequence - see below - or whether the incident was wholly fictitious, a piece of propaganda put about by his regime after the fact to justify his crime. A rumour of that sort would certainly have served a purpose useful to Diocletian in the troubled early months of his principate by demonstrating some sort of metaphysical justification for his action - i.e. that 'It was the Will of Heaven'. However, that would constitute no more than an observation and could not be considered a definitive judgment on the facts of the matter. Such a judgement could not be made given the limitations of the sources now available.)

Flavius Vopiscus relates that Diocletian did this to fulfill a prophecy which had been delivered to him by a female druid, "Imperator eris, cum Aprum occideris."

The historian Edward Gibbon was to say of this episode:

A charge supported by such decisive proof was admitted without contradiction and the legions with repeated acclamations acknowledged the justice and authority of the Emperor Diocletian.

Historian Pat Southern described Diocletian's story about Aper's scheming as ridiculous. She argued that although unlikely, it is possible that Aper could have lost his nerve because he feared retribution from suspicious soldiers if Carus had actually died of natural causes, and he claimed that the late emperor's son had also died in the same manner shortly afterwards.

Aper's death is placed in autumn 284.

== Sources ==
- Dobson, B. The significance of the Centurion and the Primipilaris in the Roman Army and Administration. Aufstieg und Niedergang der römischen Welt II. Vol. 1. pp. 392–434.
- Howe, Laurence Lee (1942). The Pretorian Prefect from Commodus to Diocletian (AD 180-305). Illinois: University of Chicago Press.
- Malcus, Bengt (1969). "Notes sur la révolution du système administratif Romain au III^{e} Siècle". Opuscula Romana. 7: 213–237.
- Petersen, Hans (1955). "Senatorial and equestrian governors in the third century A.D.". Journal of Roman Studies. 45 (1–2): 47–57. doi:10.2307/298743. JSTOR 298743. S2CID 164189976.
- Smith, R.E. (1979). Smallwood, Mary E. (ed.). "Dux, Praepositus". Zeitschrift für Papyrologie und Epigraphik. 36: 263–278. JSTOR 20185810.
- This article incorporates text from a publication now in the public domain: Smith, William (1870). "Aper, Arrius". In Smith, William (ed.). Dictionary of Greek and Roman Biography and Mythology. Vol. 1. p. 224.
