= Caesonia gens =

Ancient Roman family

The gens Caesonia was a plebeian family of ancient Rome. They first appear in history during the late Republic, remaining on the periphery of the Roman aristocracy until the time of Nero. Roman empress Milonia Caesonia, the last wife of the emperor Caligula was presumably descended from the Caesonii, as she bore their nomen. Another family of Caesonii attained the consulship several times beginning in the late second century; it is not clear how or whether they were related to the earlier Caesonii.

== Origin ==
The nomen Caesonius is a patronymic surname, based on the praenomen Caeso. The Caesonii of the second and third centuries appear to have been an unremarkable family, of senatorial or equestrian rank, which eventually was elevated to the patriciate, holding many of the most important offices in the Roman state. This branch of the family may have originated in Latium or the surrounding region, perhaps the town of Antium.

The name may derive from the root caesius, meaning "blue-grey," a word frequently used to describe the color of the eyes.

== Members ==
- Marcus Caesonius, praetor, probably in 66 BC, was a friend and colleague of Cicero.
- Titus Caesonius Priscus, an eques, held an official post under the emperor Tiberius.
- Caesonius Maximus, a friend of Seneca the Younger, was banished from Italy by the Emperor Nero in AD 66. He had been consul, but the year is uncertain.
- Caesonia, the wife of Rufus, honored by Martial in a poem describing her having the same birthday as Domitian. Some historians have speculated that she might have been Milonia Caesonia.
- Gaius Caesonius C. f. Macer Rufinianus, consul suffectus about AD 197–198.
- Lucius Caesonius C. f. C. n. Lucillus Macer Rufinianus, consul suffectus about AD 226–229.
- Lucius Caesonius L. f. C. n. Ovinius Manlius Rufinianus Bassus, consul suffectus around AD 260, and a second time in 284.
- Caesonius Bassus, consul in AD 317.
- Marcus Junius Caesonius Nicomachus Anicius Faustus Paulinus, praetor urbanus in AD 321.
- Amnius Manius Caesonius Nicomachus Anicius Paulinus, consul in AD 334.

== See also ==
- List of Roman gentes

== Bibliography ==
- Marcus Tullius Cicero, Epistulae ad Atticum, In Verrem.
- Flavius Josephus, Antiquitates Judaïcae (Antiquities of the Jews).
- Marcus Valerius Martialis (Martial), Epigrammata (Epigrams).
- Publius Cornelius Tacitus, Annales.
- Gaius Suetonius Tranquillus, De Vita Caesarum (Lives of the Caesars, or The Twelve Caesars).
- Lucius Cassius Dio Cocceianus (Cassius Dio), Roman History.
- Dictionary of Greek and Roman Biography and Mythology, William Smith, ed., Little, Brown and Company, Boston (1849).
- George Davis Chase, "The Origin of Roman Praenomina", in Harvard Studies in Classical Philology, vol. VIII (1897).
- Paul von Rohden, Elimar Klebs, & Hermann Dessau, Prosopographia Imperii Romani (The Prosopography of the Roman Empire, abbreviated PIR), Berlin (1898).
- T. Robert S. Broughton, The Magistrates of the Roman Republic, American Philological Association (1952).
- Inge Mennen, Power and Status in the Roman Empire, AD 193–284 (2011).
