= Nigrinian =

Grandson of Roman Emperor Carus

Divus Nigrinianus
- Marcus Aurelius Nigrinianus
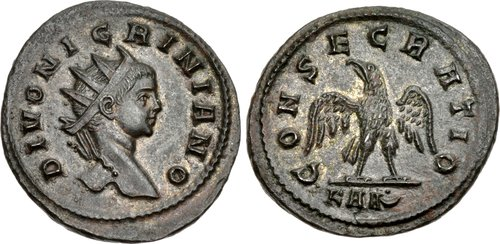
- Born: October 284 (possibly)
- Died: 284-285
- Era: Crisis of the Third Century
- Known for: grandson of Carus
- Parent(s): Paulina (mother, possibly)
- Relatives: Carus (grandfather); Carinus (uncle); Numerian (uncle)
- Family: Caran dynasty
- Honours: Consecratio

Marcus Aurelius Nigrinianus, known in English as Nigrinian (d. 284/285) was a grandson of Roman emperor Carus who died young and was deified by Carus' eldest son Carinus.

== Biography ==
Nigrinian is generally assumed to be a child of Carus' eldest son Carinus, who issued the coins commemorating him, but he could have been the child of Carus' younger son Numerian or their sister Paulina. A now lost inscription from the Forum Romanum, set up for him by Carinus's perfectissimus rationalis Gemimius Festus, merely calls him Divo Nigriniano nepoti Cari (divine Nigrinianus grandson of Carus) without mentioning his parents. This leads historian John Kent to doubt that he was the son of either Carinus or Numerian.

It has been speculated that he was born around mid-October 284. He is presumed to have died in childhood in late 284 or early 285. After his death he was given divine status.

== Research ==
Before the discovery of the dedicatory epigraph for a statue set up for him by Festus, it was sometimes conjectured that Nigrinianus was the son of the usurper Lucius Domitius Alexander, who revolted in 311 AD.

== Sources ==
- Prosopographia Imperii Romani p. 360.
