= Gaius Caesonius Macer Rufinianus =

Roman military officer, senator, governor and consul (c.157-c. 237)

Gaius Caesonius Macer Rufinianus (c. AD 157 – c. AD 237) was a Roman military officer and senator who was appointed suffect consul in around AD 197 or 198. He was the first member of gens Caesonia to hold a consulship.

== Biography ==
Caesonius Macer, the son of Gaius, was a member of the second century gens Caesonia, a family which originated from Italy, possibly hailing from Antium. Possibly of equestrian origin, he began his career probably towards the end of the reign of Marcus Aurelius as a member of the vigintiviri where, as a triumvir capitalis, he managed the prisons in Rome.

Sometime between AD 178 and 180, Caesonius Macer was commissioned military tribune of the Legio I Adiutrix which was stationed at Brigetio in Pannonia Superior. Here he fought under Marcus Aurelius in the Second Marcomannic War, during which time his unit was awarded dona militaria (or military honours) by the emperor. His next posting was as quaestor in the province of Gallia Narbonensis, after which he returned to Rome to serve as plebeian tribune, probably under the new emperor Commodus.

In around AD 185, Caesonius Macer continued his climb up the cursus honorum with his appointment as legatus proconsulis, where he assisted the governor of Hispania Baetica in his duties. Then in around AD 187, he was back in Rome where he was elected praetor. His somewhat lengthy propraetorian career began with being once again selected legatus proconsulis, this time assisting the governor of Asia. Next, he served as Curator rei publicae Asculanorum (or an officer overseeing financial issues in Asculum).

Sometime around AD 187–190, Caesonius Macer was appointed legatus legionis of the Legio VII Claudia, where he was posted to Viminacium in Moesia Superior. Then around AD 192, he was appointed the proconsular governor of Achaea, a province that was usually reserved for the junior senators of praetorian rank. Returning to Italy, Caesonius Macer was next appointed Curator rei publicae Tarracinensiumca in around AD 193, either during the end of Commodus’ reign, or early in Pertinax’s reign.

Following this Caesonius Macer was appointed legatus augusti pro praetore (or imperial governor) of the province of Lusitania, which he possibly held from AD 193/194 to 197. He was either appointed just prior to the accession of Septimius Severus, or he may have been Severus’ own appointment; in any event, he probably retained his command until he was appointed suffect consul in around AD 197 or 198. This may have been Caesonius Macer's reward for suppressing the revolt of the governor of Hispania Citerior, Lucius Novius Rufus, who was a supporter of Septimius Severus’ rival, Clodius Albinus. Following his consulship, he was appointed Curator rei publicae Teanensiumca (around AD 197); this was followed by another curatorship, this time as curator alvei Tiberis (or the official responsible for looking after the banks and channels of the Tiber River), around AD 198–200.

Caesonius Macer's political career under Septimius Severus continued with his first appointment to a consular governorship; he was made legatus augusti pro praetore of Germania Superior, a position he probably held from AD 200 to 203. Returning to Italy, he was given the role of Curator aquarum et Miniciae (or curator of the aqueducts and grain supply for Rome). The date and duration of this posting is uncertain; he may have held it any time between AD 203 and 213, with 204 being the most probable date. Next, he was appointed governor to one of the most prestigious and economically important proconsular provinces – Africa Proconsularis. Again, it is unclear exactly when he held this proconsular command – he may have held it under Caracalla sometime between AD 213–215, but he may also have held it sometime during Elagabalus’ reign, between AD 218–222.

Either before or after his proconsular governorship, Caesonius Macer was again appointed as a curator, this time as curator rei publicae Lanivinorum, an office he filled on two occasions sometime during the later years of Caracalla's reign. A member of the sodales Augustales, he was made the comes of the emperor Alexander Severus during the emperor's Persian campaign of 231–233. Given that Caesonius Macer was around seventy years of age by this time, it has been conjectured that he did not actually accompany the emperor to the east, and that the title was now beginning to be used as an honorific to indicate an individual who was connected to the imperial court.

== Family ==
Caesonius Macer was married to Manilia Lucilla, who was related to Tiberius Manilius Fuscus, who was consul twice. They had at least one child, Lucius Caesonius Lucillus Macer Rufinianus, who was suffect consul possibly between AD 225 and 230.

== Sources ==
- Mennen, Inge, Power and Status in the Roman Empire, AD 193-284 (2011)
- CIL XIV, 3900

Political offices
Preceded by Uncertain	Consul suffectus of the Roman Empire around AD 197/198	Succeeded by Uncertain
