= Lucius Caesonius Lucillus Macer Rufinianus =

Roman administrator, general and consul

Consul of the Roman Republic
- Incumbent
- Assumed office Between 225 and 229

Personal details
- Born: c. 195
- Died: c. 255

Military service
- Allegiance: Roman Empire
- Commands: Governor of Africa

Lucius Caesonius Lucillus Macer Rufinianus (c. 195 – c. 255) was a Roman military officer and senator who was appointed suffect consul estimated in between AD 225 and 229. Much of what we know about him comes from an inscription found on the base of a statute near Tivoli.

Caesonius Lucillus occupied a succession of posts: the junior magistracy of the decemvir stlitibus judicandis; a quaestor; and a praetor, all sponsored by the emperor, Caracalla (r. 211–217). He was appointed imperial governor of several Italian towns, then legate of Roman Tunisia. Around 226–229, the emperor Alexander Severus (r. 222–235) appointed him consul. He filled various senior administrative posts before being appointed governor of Africa (Tunisia). After relinquishing this position he was appointed to some of the most senior administrative positions in the Empire, before dying in around 255.

== Career ==
=== Early ===
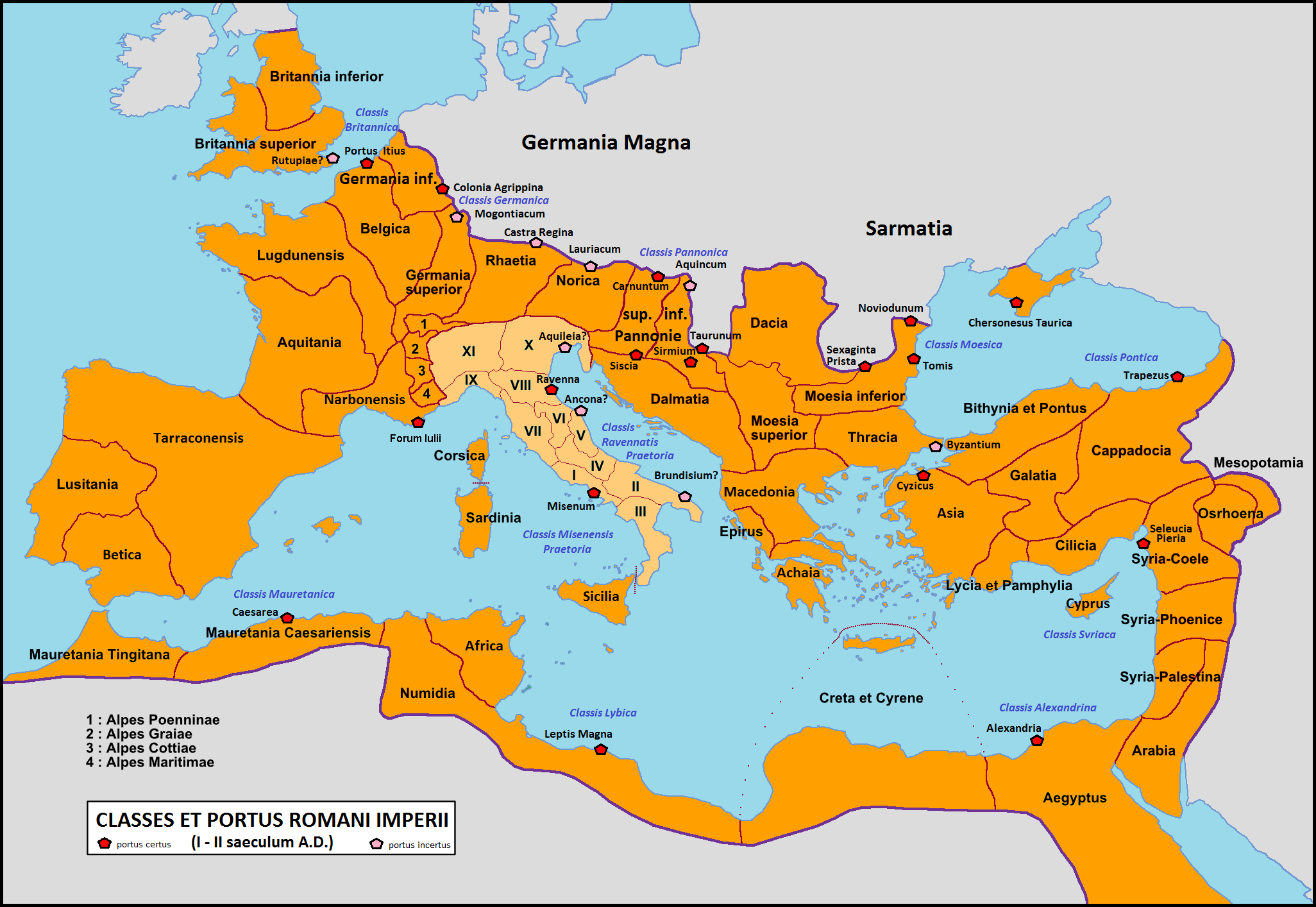
The Roman Empire at the time of Caesonius Lucillus

Caesonius Lucillus was the son of Gaius Caesonius Macer Rufinianus and a member of the third century gens Caesonia, which was elevated to Patrician status during his time in politics. Much of what we know about him comes from an inscription found on the base of a statute near Tivoli, 30 kilometres (19 miles) from Rome. He probably began his career at the beginning of the reign of Caracalla (r. 211–217) as a member of the Vigintiviri, a group of minor magistracies, serving as a decemvir stlitibus judicandis. He was appointed as an imperial candidate to the office of quaestor, a senior position which could have involved one of a range of responsibilities, towards the end of Caracalla's reign. This was followed in around 220/222 by his appointment as praetor, a senior imperial administrator, probably under Elagabalus (r. 218–222) . This career path from quaestor to praetor as an imperial candidate was standard during the third century for ascent up the cursus honorum, the traditional series of military, administrative and judicial positions of steadily increasing responsibility which aspiring upper-class Romans were expected to progress through.

Following in his father's steps, Caesonius Lucillus was appointed curator (overseer) of a number of Italian cities. Immediately after his praetorship, he served as curator for Suessanorum in Campania; this was followed by a curatorship at either Puteoli (also in Campania), or at Tusculum (in Latium). Then, probably sometime between 225 and 228, he was appointed legate, or deputy governor with responsibility for military affairs, of the province of Africa, which roughly corresponds with modern Tunisia. Around this time (226–229), the emperor Alexander Severus (r. 222–235) appointed him consul. Becoming a consul was the highest honour of the Roman state, and as such candidates were chosen carefully by the emperor.

=== Post-consular ===
After serving as consul, in c. 227–230, Caesonius Lucillus was given the responsibility for maintaining the channels of the Tiber River (Curator alvei Tiberis et cloacarum urbis) as well as the sewers of ancient Rome. Around 230–235 he was made responsible for the city's aqueducts and grain supply (Curator aquarum et Miniciae). In 238 he was chosen as one of the group of twenty senators who temporarily took over the government of the empire after the rebellion against Maximinus Thrax and the unexpected death of Gordian I (vigintiviri ex senatus consulto rei publicae curandae). His selection to this prestigious group was a reflection of the esteem in which he was held within the Senate.

Sometime after 240, Caesonius Lucillus was appointed proconsular governor of Africa, where he had previously served as a legate. Governor of Africa was an important position, as much of the grain which the city of Rome depended on came from there. He may have been sent there in response to the revolt of Sabinianus, with instructions to settle the province in the aftermath of Sabinianus’ death, a reflection of the trust the emperor Gordian III placed in him. This was followed by his appointment as the official deputising for the emperor in overseeing judicial cases (Electus ad cognoscendas vice Caesaris cognitionis); this was probably between 242 and 244 when Gordian III was conducting his Persian campaign, but it is possible that he may have held this post at any time before 254. If he did hold it until 244, he may have relinquished the role once the new emperor, Philip the Arab (r. 244–249), arrived in Rome. Caesonius Lucillus’ final posting was as praefectus urbi of Rome, the senior administrative position of the capital with responsibilities similar to those of an executive mayor. He possibly held this in 246, but again he could have filled it at any time before 254.

== Family ==
Caesonius Lucillus was a member of the Arval Brethren, an prestigious priesthood of the time; Emperor Elagabalus is known to have been formally accepted as a member. He probably married a woman from the gens Ovinia, and together they had at least one child, Lucius Caesonius Ovinius Manlius Rufinianus Bassus, who was suffect consul twice.

== Sources ==
- Birley, A. R., Senators as Generals in Kaiser, Heer und Gesellschaft in der Römischen Kaiserzeit (ed. Eric Birley, Géza Alföldy, Brian Dobson, Werner Eck) (2000) Stuttgart: Steiner. ISBN 9783515076548
- Mennen, Inge, Power and Status in the Roman Empire, AD 193-284 (2011)
- Southern, Pat, The Roman Empire from Severus to Constantine (2004)

Political offices
Preceded by Uncertain	Consul suffectus of the Roman Empire around AD 226-229	Succeeded by Uncertain
