= Mason Hammond =

American educator and scholar (1903-2002)

Mason Hammond (1903 – 13 October 2002) was an American educator and scholar. He was a Harvard University professor, an authority on Latin and the history of Rome and the Roman Empire, and chairman of the board of trustees at St. Mark's School.

Professor Hammond's work has proven highly durable. His book City State and World State was still in print 51 years after it was first published as City-State and World State in Greek and Roman Political Theory Until Augustus. His book The Antonine Monarchy remained available 43 years after its first release.

== Biography ==
Hammond was born and raised in Boston. He attended St. Mark's School. He graduated with a bachelor's degree summa cum laude from Harvard University in 1925, then studied at Oxford for three years, partially on a Rhodes Scholarship. He returned to Harvard in 1928 in a teaching position.

Hammond directed classical studies at the American Academy in Rome from 1937 to 1939, as well as during the 1950s. His experience with Italian studies and educational institutions also included two stretches as the director of Harvard's Villa I Tatti in Florence.

During World War II, Hammond's services became invaluable. Initially assigned as an intelligence officer in Italy, Hammond was reassigned to the Monuments, Fine Arts, and Archives Office (MFAA) on the recommendation of the staff of the Roberts Commission. In May 1943, he was the first officer ordered to the field to serve in this position. He joined U.S. troops in northern Africa as they prepared to invade Sicily and southern Italy and subsequently traveled throughout Sicily, Italy, and later Germany as a Monuments officer. In this role, he recovered and protected works of art which had been confiscated by the previous regimes. For his work in the MFAA, Hammond received Italian and Dutch honors and the French Legion of Honor.

Hammond returned to Harvard after his war years and continued teaching, eventually being named Harvard's Pope professor of the Latin language and literature from 1950 until his 1973 retirement. After his retirement he served as Harvard Historian. He contributed extensively researched monographs on Harvard institutions including the stained glass in Memorial Hall, music at Commencement, Harvard china, Latin and Greek inscriptions found on the campus.

Hammond married Florence Pierson. They had three daughters. She preceded him in death.

== Published works ==
- The Augustan Principate in Theory and Practice During the Julio-Claudian Period, rev. ed. 1968.
- The Menaechmi of Plautus
- The City in The Ancient World
- The Antonine Monarchy
- City State and World State (first published as "City-State and World State in Greek and Roman Political Theory Until Augustus")
- Aeneas to Augustus: A Beginning Latin Reader for College Students (Co-authored with Anne Amory)

== Awards and recognitions ==
- Honorary Doctor of Letters degree at the 1994 Harvard Commencement.
- The Harvard Medal from the Harvard Alumni Association in 1987.
- As an undergraduate, Hammond received the Wendell Scholarship, awarded on the basis of academic achievement and contribution to the College community.
