= Rufinia gens =

The gens Rufinia was an obscure plebeian family at ancient Rome. Few members of this gens are mentioned in history, although the derivative surname Rufinianus appears in several sources. A number of Rufinii are known from inscriptions.

== Origin ==
The nomen Rufinius belongs to a class of gentilicia formed from surnames ending in -inus, using the suffix -inius. The name was formed from the cognomen Rufinus, reddish, a diminutive of Rufus, red, and in this way is related to a number of other gentilicia formed from rufus, ruber, and rutilus, all with similar meanings, and in most cases originally applied to someone with red or reddish hair.

== Praenomina ==
The Rufinii used a number of common praenomina, including Gaius, Titus, Marcus, Publius, and Lucius.

== Members ==
This list includes abbreviated praenomina. For an explanation of this practice, see filiation.

- Rufinia, buried at Rome, aged forty-two.
- Rufinia, named in an inscription from Berytus in Syria.
- Rufinia, buried in a family sepulchre at Comum in Cisalpine Gaul, was the wife of either Rufus or Rufinius Secundus.
- Rufinia, buried at Rome in a tomb dedicated by her parents, Amandus and Protogenia.
- Gaius Rufinius, named in an inscription from Verona in Venetia and Histria.
- Gaius Rufinius, the benefactor of Julius Adlucus, named as his heir in an inscription found near Pictones in Gallia Aquitania.
- Rufus Rufinius, (Note: Here Rufus is probably an "inverted cognomen" rather than a praenomen; as a praenomen Rufus is found almost exclusively in Cisalpine Gaul, where there was a fashion for unusual names. Rufus is found as a cognomen borne by other members of the Rufinia gens.) a centurion in the third legion, and the husband of Julia Ziora, was buried at Lambaesis in Numidia with a tomb dedicated by his son, Rufinius Vitalis.
- Titus Rufinius, named in an inscription from Tarraco in Hispania Citerior.
- Rufinius Adnametus, the son of Africanus, made a donation to the spirit of Lucius Caesar at Avaricum in Gallia Aquitania.
- Rufinia Auxesis, the wife of Popilius Fortunatus, and mother of Popilia Felicula, a little girl buried at Rome, aged six years, two months, and twelve days.
- Publius Rufinius Ephestion, the husband of Ulpia Sabina, a woman buried at Rome.
- Marcus Rufinius Felix, one of the Seviri Augustales at Civitas Saliniensum in Alpes Maritimae, made an offering to the gods at Cemenelum, the provincial capital, dating to the second century AD.
- Titus Rufinius Geminus, buried at Rome with a tomb dedicated by his client, Titus Rufinius Parthenius.
- Rufinia C. f. Graeca, the wife of Gaius Firmius, and mother of Firmia and Secunda, buried in a family sepulchre at Mediolanum in Cisalpine Gaul.
- Rufinia Helpis, buried at Rome with a tomb dedicated by her husband, Rannius Secundus.
- Rufinius Maximus, the father of Rufinius Secundus, and grandfather of Marcus Rufinius Secundinus.
- Rufinia Nigra, buried at the present site of Bou Auya, formerly part of Africa Proconsularis.
- Titus Rufinius Parthenius, dedicated a tomb at Rome to his patron, Titus Rufinius Geminus.
- Rufinia Paterna, buried at Briginno in Gallia Narbonensis, with a tomb dedicated by her son, Marcus Messius Maternus.
- Lucius Rufinius Primus Italicus, a resident of Regina in Hispania Baetica, where he was buried, aged forty, with a tomb dedicated by his wife, Fabia Campana.
- Rufinius Rufus, dedicated a tomb at Comagena in Noricum to his wife, Claudia Aquina, aged thirty-five.
- Rufinius Saturninus, a soldier in the first legion, made an offering to Neptune at Colonia Claudia Ara Agrippinensium in Germania Inferior.
- Rufinius Saturninus, together with Apuleius Aequalis, built a tomb at Prusa ad Olympum in Bithynia and Pontus to Nobilinius Scriptio, a soldier in the thirtieth legion, aged forty, who had served in the Roman army for seventeen years.
- Marcus Rufinius Secundinus, son of Rufinius Secundus, and grandson of Rufinius Maximus, buried in a family sepulchre at Comum.
- Rufinius Secundus, son of Rufinius Maximus, and father of Marcus Rufinius Secundinus, built a family sepulchre at Comum.
- Publius Rufinius Serenus, dedicated a tomb at Puteoli in Campania to his wife, Junia Theodota.
- Marcus Rufinius Severus, gave a libationary offering to the fata of Dervonna, local goddesses of Cisalpine Gaul, at Brixia in Venetia and Histria.
- Rufinius Silbinus, buried at Aeclanum in Samnium, with a tomb dedicated by his foster-father, Rufinius Successus, dating to the first century AD.
- Rufinius Silvanus, buried at Regina, aged forty, with a monument from his wife, Vibia Aurelia.
- Gaius Rufinius Silvester, buried at Aeclanum.
- Rufinia Successa, buried at Aeclanum.
- Rufinius Successus, dedicated a tomb at Aeclanum to his foster-son, Rufinius Silbinus.
- Rufinius Vitalis, son of the centurion Rufus Rufinius and Julia Ziora.

== See also ==
- List of Roman gentes

== Bibliography ==
- Dictionary of Greek and Roman Biography and Mythology, William Smith, ed., Little, Brown and Company, Boston (1849).
- Theodor Mommsen et alii, Corpus Inscriptionum Latinarum (The Body of Latin Inscriptions, abbreviated CIL), Berlin-Brandenburgische Akademie der Wissenschaften (1853–present).
- Giovanni Battista de Rossi, Inscriptiones Christianae Urbis Romanae Septimo Saeculo Antiquiores (Christian Inscriptions from Rome of the First Seven Centuries, abbreviated ICUR), Vatican Library, Rome (1857–1861, 1888).
- Notizie degli Scavi di Antichità (News of Excavations from Antiquity, abbreviated NSA), Accademia dei Lincei (1876–present).
- René Cagnat et alii, L'Année épigraphique (The Year in Epigraphy, abbreviated AE), Presses Universitaires de France (1888–present).
- George Davis Chase, "The Origin of Roman Praenomina", in Harvard Studies in Classical Philology, vol. VIII, pp. 103–184 (1897).
- Paul von Rohden, Elimar Klebs, & Hermann Dessau, Prosopographia Imperii Romani (The Prosopography of the Roman Empire, abbreviated PIR), Berlin (1898).
