= Caesar (title) =

Imperial title in the Roman and Byzantine Empires

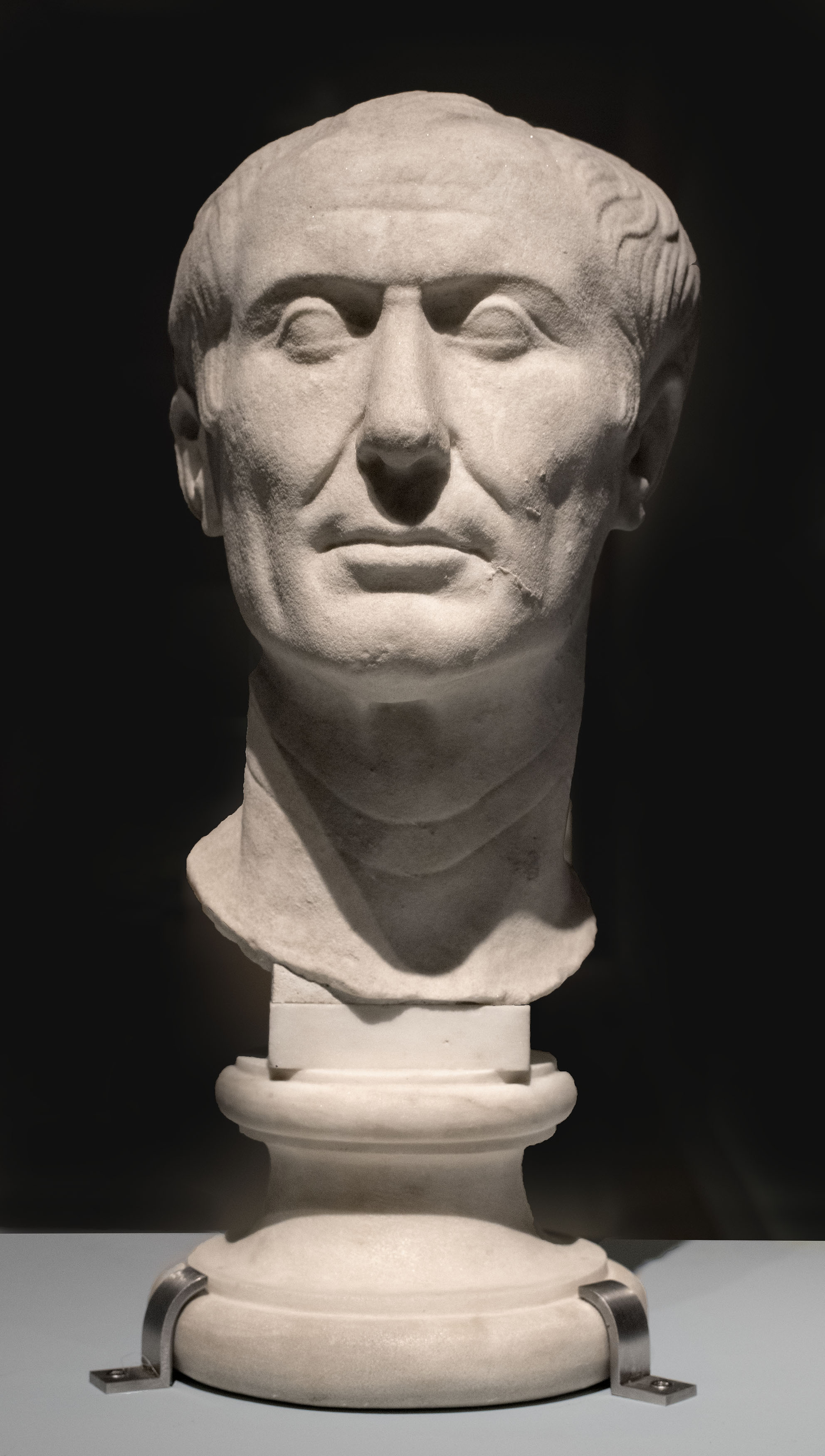
- Sculpture depicting Julius Caesar
- Pronunciation: English: /ˈsiːzər/ SEE-zər; Classical Latin: [ˈkae̯sar]
- Gender: Male
- Language: Latin

Origin
- Meaning: Short hair (disputed), nickname then title
- Region of origin: Roman Republic

Other names
- Variant forms: Καῖσαρ; Kaiser; Tsar; Qayser
- Popularity: see popular names

Caesar
- Καῖσαρ
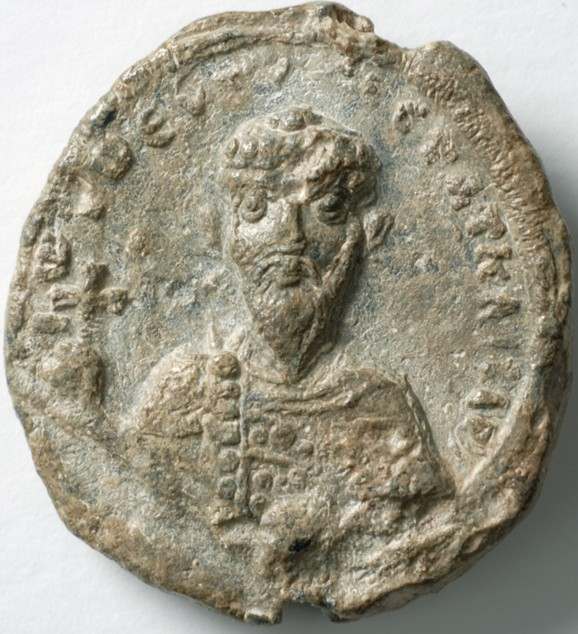
- Seal of the Caesar John Doukas
- Style: My lord caesar (Δέσποτά μου καίσαρ); Your Majesty (Ἡ βασιλεία σου)
- Member of: Roman Imperial Family
- Appointer: Roman emperor
- Term length: Life tenure or until accession as sovereign (before 641)
- Formation: 8 June 68
- First holder: Piso Licinianus
- Final holder: John Palaiologos
- Abolished: May 29, 1453; 573 years ago
- Succession: Third (After 1163); Second (after 1081); First

Caesar (Note: Latin: [ˈkae̯.sar] — English pl. Caesars — Latin pl. Caesares — Greek: Καῖσαρ, romanized: Kaîsar) is a title of imperial character. It derives from the cognomen of Julius Caesar. The change from being a surname to a title used by the Roman emperors can be traced to AD 68, following the fall of the Julio-Claudian dynasty. When used on its own, the title denoted heirs apparent, who would later adopt the title Augustus on accession. The title remained an essential part of the style of the emperors, and became the word for "emperor" in some languages, such as German (Kaiser) and Slavic (Tsar).

== Origins ==
The first known individual to bear the cognomen of "Caesar" was Sextus Julius Caesar, who is likewise believed to be the common ancestor of all subsequent Julii Caesares. Sextus's great-grandson was the dictator Gaius Julius Caesar, who seized control of the Roman Republic following his war against the Senate. He appointed himself as dictator perpetuo ('dictator in perpetuity'), a title he held for only about a month before he was assassinated in 44 BC. Julius Caesar's death did not lead to the restoration of the Republic, and instead led to the rise of the Second Triumvirate, which was made up of three generals, including Julius's adopted son Gaius Octavius.

Following Roman naming conventions, Octavius adopted the name of his adoptive father, thus also becoming "Gaius Julius Caesar", though he was often called "Octavianus" to avoid confusion. He styled himself simply as "Gaius Caesar" to emphasize his relationship with Julius Caesar. Eventually, distrust and jealousy between the triumvirs led to a lengthy civil war which ultimately ended with Octavius gaining control of the entire Roman world in 30 BC. In 27 BC, Octavius was given the honorific Augustus by the Senate, adopting the name of "Imperator Caesar Augustus". He had previously dropped all his names except for "Caesar", which he treated as a nomen, and had adopted the victory title imperator ('commander') as a new praenomen.

As a matter of course, Augustus's own adopted son and successor, Tiberius, followed his (step)father's example and bore the name "Caesar" following his adoption on 26 June 4 AD, restyling himself as "Tiberius Julius Caesar". Upon his own ascension to the throne, he styled himself as "Tiberius Caesar Augustus". The precedent was thus then set: the Emperor, styled as "Augustus", designated his successor by adopting him and giving him the name "Caesar".

The fourth emperor, Claudius (in full, "Tiberius Claudius Caesar Augustus"), was the first to assume the name without having been adopted by the previous emperor. However, he was at least a member of the Julio-Claudian dynasty, being the maternal great-nephew of Augustus on his mother's side, the nephew of Tiberius, and the uncle of Caligula (who was also called "Gaius Julius Caesar"). Claudius, in turn, adopted his stepson and grand-nephew Lucius Domitius Ahenobarbus, giving him the name "Caesar" in addition to his own nomen, "Claudius". His stepson thus became "Nero Claudius Caesar Augustus".

== Dynastic title ==
The first emperor to assume both the position and name without any real claim was Galba, who took the throne under the name "Servius Galba Caesar Augustus" following the death of Nero in AD 68. Galba helped solidify "Caesar" as the title of the designated heir by giving it to his own adopted heir, Piso Licinianus. His reign did not last long, however, and he was soon killed by Otho, who became "Marcus Otho Caesar Augustus". Otho was then defeated by Vitellius, who became "Aulus Vitellius Germanicus Augustus", adopting the victory title "Germanicus" instead. Nevertheless, "Caesar" had become such an integral part of the imperial dignity that its place was immediately restored by Vespasian, who ended the civil war and established the Flavian dynasty in AD 69, ruling as "Imperator Caesar Vespasianus Augustus".

The placement of the name "Caesar" varied among the early emperors. It usually came right before the cognomen (Vespasian, Titus, Domitian, Trajan, Hadrian); a few placed it right after it (Galba, Otho, Nerva). The imperial formula was finally standardised during the reign of Antoninus Pius. Antoninus, born "Titus Aurelius Antoninus", became "Titus Aelius Caesar Antoninus" after his adoption but ruled as "Imperator Caesar Titus Aelius Hadrianus Antoninus Augustus Pius". The imperial formula thus became "Imperator Caesar [name] Augustus" for emperors. Heir-apparents added "Caesar" to their names, placing it after their cognomen. Caesars occasionally were given the honorific princeps iuventutis ("First among the Youth") and, starting with the 3rd century, nobilissimus ("Most Noble").

== Later developments ==
=== Crisis of the Third Century ===
The popularity of using the title caesar to designate heirs-apparent increased throughout the third century. Many of the soldier-emperors during the Crisis of the Third Century attempted to strengthen their legitimacy by naming their sons as heirs with the title of caesar, namely Maximinus Thrax, Philip the Arab, Decius, Trebonianus Gallus, Gallienus and Carus. With the exception of Verus Maximus and Valerian II all of them were later either promoted to the rank of augustus within their father's lifetime (like Philip II) or succeeded as augusti after their father's death (Hostilian and Numerian). The same title would also be used in the Gallic Empire, which operated autonomously from the rest of the Roman Empire from 260 to 274, with the final Gallic emperor Tetricus I appointing his heir Tetricus II as caesar and his consular colleague.

Despite the best efforts of these emperors, however, the granting of this title does not seem to have made succession in this chaotic period any more stable. Almost all caesares would be killed before, or alongside, their fathers, or, at best, outlive them for a matter of months, as in the case of Hostilian. The sole caesar to successfully obtain the rank of augustus and rule for some time in his own right was Gordian III, and even he was heavily controlled by his court.

=== Tetrarchy and Diarchy ===
In 293, Diocletian established the Tetrarchy, a system of rule by two senior emperors and two junior colleagues. The two coequal senior emperors were styled identically to previous Emperors, as augustus (in plural, augusti). The two junior colleagues were styled identically to previous Emperors-designate, as nobilissimus caesar. Likewise, the junior colleagues retained the title caesar upon becoming full emperors. The caesares of this period are sometimes referred as "emperors", with the Tetrarchy being a "rule of four emperors", despite being clearly subordinate of the augusti and thus not actually sovereigns.

The Tetrarchy collapsed as soon as Diocletian stepped down in 305, resulting in a lengthy civil war. Constantine reunited the Empire in 324, after defeating the Eastern emperor Licinius. The tetrarchic division of power was abandoned, although the divisions of the praetorian prefectures were maintained. The title caesar continued to be used, but now merely as a ceremorial honorific for young heirs. Constantine had four caesares at the time of his death: his sons Constantius II, Constantine II, Constans and his nephew Dalmatius, with his eldest son Crispus having been executed in mysterious circumstances earlier in his reign. He would be succeeded only by his three sons, with Dalmatius dying in the summer of 337 in similarly murky circumstances. Constantius II himself would nominate as caesares his cousins Constantius Gallus and Julian in succession in the 350s, although he first executed Gallus and then found himself at war with Julian before his own death. After Julian's revolt of 360, the title fell out of imperial fashion for some time, with emperors preferring simply to elevate their sons directly to augustus, starting with Gratian in 367.

The title would be revived in 408 when Constantine III gave it to his son Constans II, and then in 424 when Theodosius II gave it to his nephew Valentinian III before successfully installing him upon the western throne as augustus in 425. Thereafter it would receive limited use in the Eastern Empire; for example, it was given to Leo II in 472 several months before his grandfather's death. In the Western Empire, Palladius, the son of emperor Petronius Maximus, became the last person bearing the title caesar in 455.

=== Byzantine Empire ===
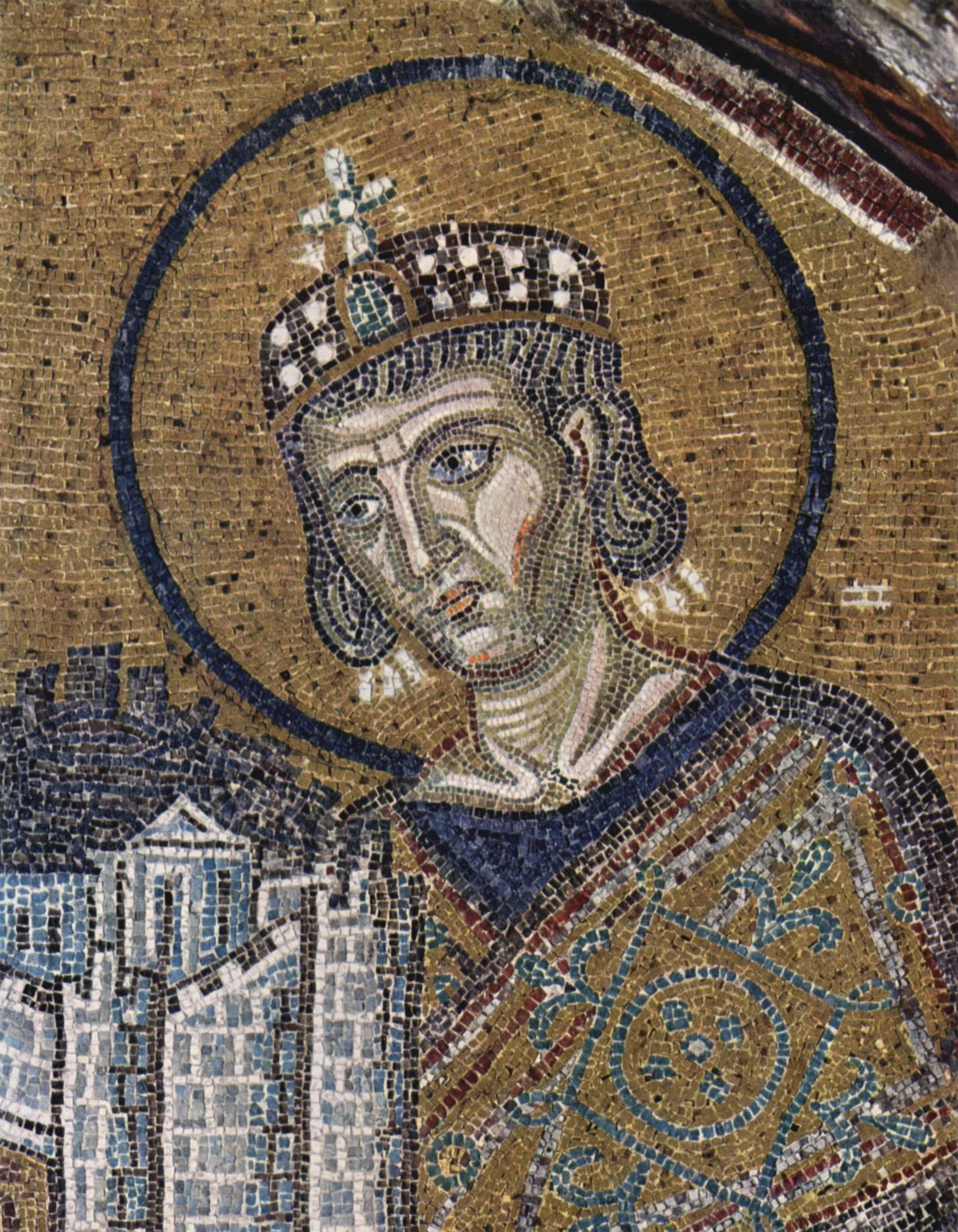
The Roman emperor Constantine the Great, mosaic in Hagia Sophia, Constantinople

Caesar or Kaisar (Καῖσαρ) remained a senior court title in the Eastern or Byzantine Empire. Originally, as in the classical Roman Empire, it was used for the heir apparent, and was first among the "awarded" dignities. From the reign of Theodosius I, however, most emperors chose to solidify the succession of their intended heirs by raising them to co-emperors, i.e. augustus. Hence the title was more frequently awarded to second- and third-born sons, or to close and influential relatives of the Emperor: for example, Alexios Mosele who was the son-in-law of Theophilos (ruled 829–842), Bardas who was the uncle and chief minister of Michael III (r. 842–867), and Nikephoros II (r. 963–969) who awarded the title to his father, Bardas Phokas. An exceptional case was the conferment of the dignity and its insignia to the Bulgarian khan Tervel by Justinian II (r. 685–695, 705–711) who had helped him regain his throne in 705. The title was awarded to the brother of Empress Maria of Alania, George II of Georgia in 1081. In this period, the epithet eutychestatos (εὐτυχεστάτος) 'most fortunate' was commonly attached to the title.

The office enjoyed extensive privileges, great prestige and power. When Alexios I Komnenos created the title of sebastokrator, kaisar became third in importance, and fourth after Manuel I Komnenos created the title of despot, which it remained until the end of the Empire. The feminine form was kaisarissa. It remained an office of great importance, usually awarded to imperial relations, as well as a few high-ranking and distinguished officials, and only rarely awarded to foreigners.

According to the Klētorologion of 899, the Byzantine caesar's insignia were a crown without a cross, and the ceremony of a caesar's creation (in this case dating to Constantine V), is included in De Ceremoniis I.43. The title remained the highest in the imperial hierarchy until the introduction of the sebastokratōr (a composite derived from sebastos and autokrator, the Greek equivalents of augustus and imperator) by Alexios I Komnenos (r. 1081–1118) and later of despotēs by Manuel I Komnenos (r. 1143–1180). The title remained in existence through the last centuries of the Empire. In the Palaiologan period, it was held by prominent nobles such as Alexios Strategopoulos, but from the 14th century, it was mostly awarded to rulers of the Balkans such as the princes of Vlachia, Serbia and Thessaly.

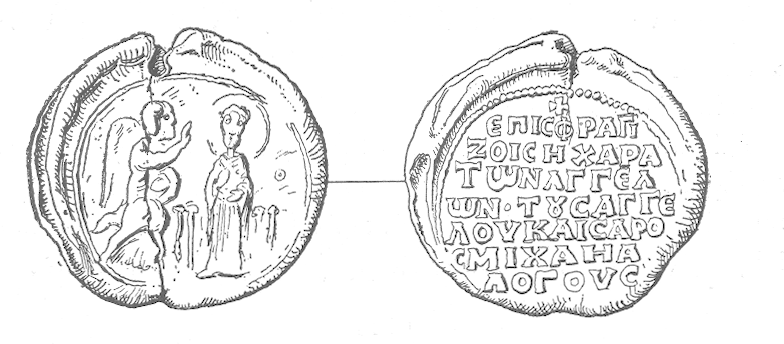
Drawing of the seal of the caesar Michael Angelos

In the late Byzantine hierarchy, as recorded in the mid-14th century Book of Offices of pseudo-Kodinos, the rank continued to come after the sebastokratōr. Pseudo-Kodinos further records that the caesar was equal in precedence to the panhypersebastos, another creation of Alexios I, but that Emperor Michael VIII Palaiologos (r. 1259–1282) had raised his nephew Michael Tarchaneiotes to the rank of protovestiarios and decreed that to come after the caesar; while under Andronikos II Palaiologos (r. 1282–1328) the megas domestikos was raised to the same eminence, when it was awarded to the future emperor John VI Kantakouzenos (r. 1347–1354). According to pseudo-Kodinos, the caesar's insignia under the Palaiologoi was a skiadion hat in red and gold, decorated with gold-wire embroideries, with a veil bearing the wearer's name and pendants identical to those of the despotēs and the sebastokratōr. He wore a red tunic (rouchon) similar to the emperor's (without certain decorations), and his shoes and stockings were blue, as were the accouterments of his horse; these were all identical to those of the sebastokratōr, but without the embroidered eagles of the latter. Pseudo-Kodinos writes that the particular forms of another form of hat, the domed skaranikon, and of the mantle, the tamparion, for the caesar were not known.

=== Ottoman Empire ===
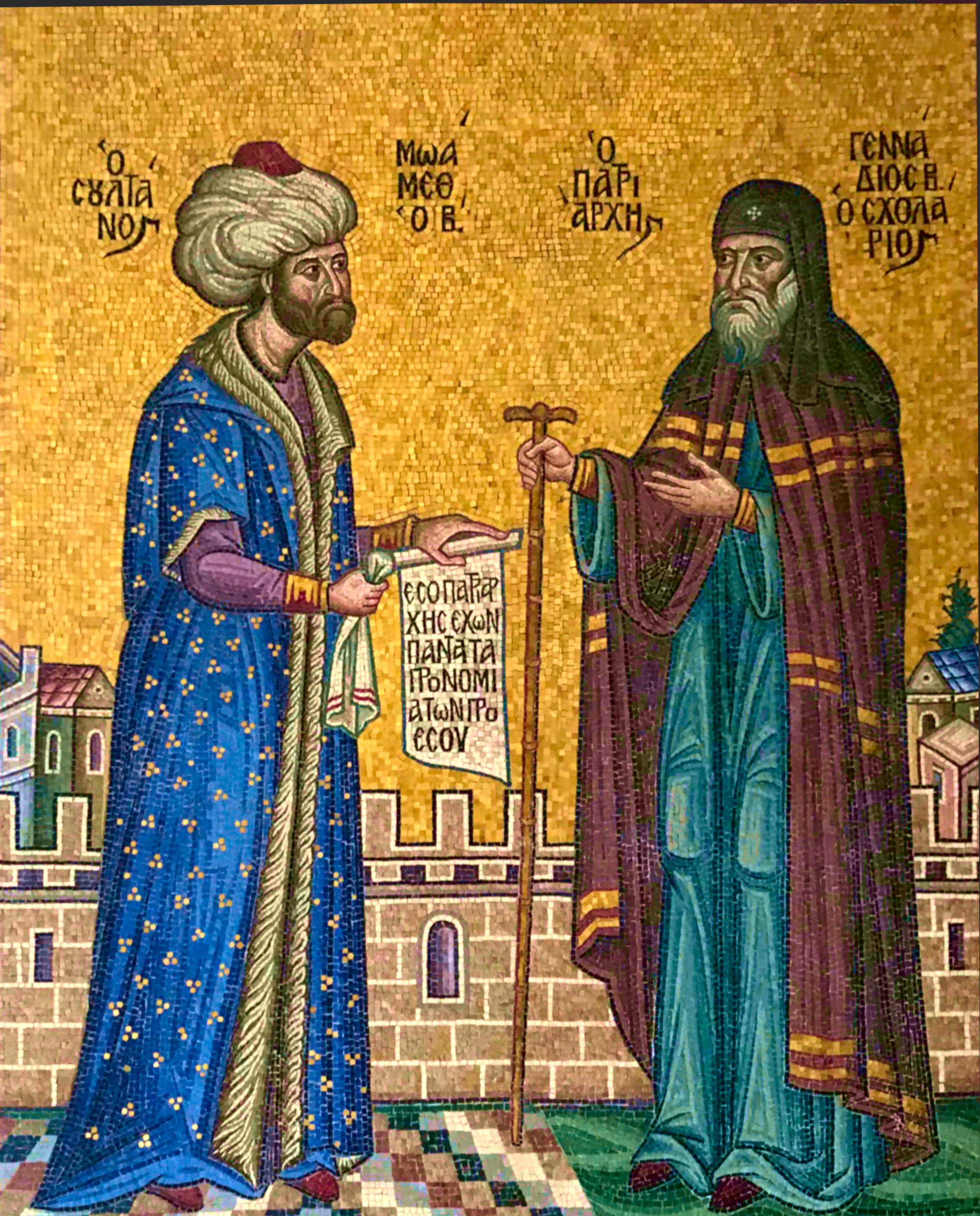
Mehmed II and Ecumenical Patriarch of Constantinople Gennadios.

"Caesar" is the title officially used by the Sasanid Persians to refer to the Roman and Byzantine emperors. In the Middle East, the Persians and the Arabs continued to refer to the Roman and Byzantine emperors as "Caesar" (in Persian: قیصر روم Qaysar-i Rum, "Caesar of the Romans", from Middle Persian kēsar). Thus, following the conquest of Constantinople in 1453, the victorious Ottoman sultan Mehmed II became the first of the rulers of the Ottoman Empire to assume the title (in Ottoman Turkish: قیصر روم Kayser-i Rûm).

After the Fall of Constantinople, having conquered the Byzantine Empire, Mehmed took the title Kayser-i Rûm, claiming succession to the Roman imperium. His claim was that, by possession of the city, he was emperor, a new dynast by conquest, as had been done previously by the likes of Heraclius and Leo III. Contemporary scholar George of Trebizond wrote "the seat of the Roman Empire is Constantinople ... and he who is and remains Emperor of the Romans is also the Emperor of the whole world".

Gennadius II, a staunch antagonist of the West because of the Sack of Constantinople committed by the Western Catholics and theological controversies between the two Churches, had been enthroned the Ecumenical Patriarch of Constantinople-New Rome with all the ceremonial elements and ethnarch (or milletbashi) status by the Sultan himself in 1454. In turn, Gennadius II formally recognized Mehmed as successor to the throne. Mehmed also had a blood lineage to the Byzantine Imperial family; his predecessor, Sultan Orhan had married a Byzantine princess, and Mehmed may have claimed descent from John Tzelepes Komnenos.

In diplomatic writings between the Ottomans and Austrians, the Ottoman bureaucracy was angered by their use of the Caesar title when the Ottomans saw themself as the true successors of Rome. When war broke out and peace negotiations were done, the Austrians (Holy Roman Empire) agreed to give up the use of the Caesar title according to Treaty of Constantinople (1533) (though they would continue to use it and the Roman imperial title until the collapse of the Holy Roman Empire in 1806). The Russians, who defined Moscow as the Third Rome, were similarly sanctioned by the Ottomans, who ordered the Crimean Khanate to raid Russia on numerous occasions. The Ottomans stopped claiming political superiority over the Holy Roman Empire with the Treaty of Zsitvatorok in 1606, and over the Russian Empire with the Treaty of Küçük Kaynarca in 1774, by diplomatically recognising the monarchs of these two countries as equals to the Ottoman Sultan for the first time.

== List of holders ==
Note: Caesars who later became Augusti and thus emperors are highlighted in bold.

Coin	Name	Acceded	Relinquished	Reason	Reigning Emperor	Relation	R.
	Piso Licinianus	10 January 69	15 January 69	murdered	Galba	Adopted son	
	**Titus**	21 December 69	24 June 79	succeeded as augustus	Vespasian	Son	
	**Domitian**	21 December 69	14 September 81	succeeded as augustus	Vespasian/Titus	Son/Brother	
	Flavius	after AD 74	before AD 83 (?)	died as a child	Domitian	Son	
	**Trajan**	Late October 97	28 January 98	succeeded as augustus	Nerva	Adopted son	
	Lucius Aelius	June/August 136	1 January 138	died of illness	Hadrian	Adopted son	
	**Antoninus Pius**	25 February 138	10 July 138	succeeded as augustus	Hadrian	Adopted son	
	**Marcus Aurelius**	Late 139	7 March 161	succeeded as augustus	Antoninus Pius	Son-in-law	
	Annius Verus	12 October 166	10 September 169	died of a tumor	Marcus Aurelius/Lucius Verus	Son/Nephew	
	**Commodus**	12 October 166	Summer 177	proclaimed augustus	Marcus Aurelius/Lucius Verus	Son/Nephew	
	Pertinax Minor	c. January 193	c. March 193	title revoked	Pertinax	Son	
	Clodius Albinus	c. 194	c. 196	title revoked	Septimius Severus	–	
	**Caracalla**	4 April 196	28 January 198	proclaimed augustus	Septimius Severus	Son	
	**Geta**	28 January 198	c. October 209	proclaimed augustus	Septimius Severus	Son/Brother	
	**Diadumenian**	April 217	May 218	proclaimed augustus	Macrinus	Son	
	**Severus Alexander**	June 221	14 March 222	succeeded as augustus	Elagabalus	Adopted son and cousin	
	Sallustius (?)	c. 227	c. 227	executed	Severus Alexander	Father-in-law	
	Verus Maximus	January/May 236	May/June 238	murdered	Maximinus Thrax	Son	
	**Gordian III**	April/May 238	August 238	succeeded as augustus	Balbinus/Pupienus	–	
	**Philip II**	August 244	July/August 247	proclaimed augustus	Philip the Arab	Son	
	**Herennius Etruscus**	September 250	May 251	proclaimed augustus	Decius	Son	
	**Hostilian**	September 250	June 251	succeeded as augustus	Decius	Son	
	**Volusianus**	c. July 251	c. August 251	proclaimed augustus	Trebonianus Gallus	Son	
	Valerian II	c. September 256	Summer 258	murdered?	Valerian/Gallienus	Grandson/Son	
	**Saloninus**	c. June 258	c. July 260	proclaimed augustus	Valerian/Gallienus	Grandson/Son	
	**Carinus**	November (?) 282	Spring 283	proclaimed augustus	Carus	Son	
	**Numerian**	November (?) 282	July 283	succeeded as augustus	Carus/Carinus	Son/Brother	
	**Maximian** (?)	21 July (?) 285 (Note: Some authors argue that Maximian was never caesar given the lack of concrete evidence for this.)	1 April (?) 286 (Note: Or, alternatively, December 285.)	succeeded as augustus	Diocletian (East)	–	
	**Constantius I**	1 March 293	1 May 305	succeeded as augustus	Maximian (West)	Son-in-law	
	**Galerius**	21 March 293	1 May 305	succeeded as augustus	Diocletian (East)	Son-in-law	
	**Severus II**	1 May 305	August 306	succeeded as augustus	Maximian (West)	–	
	**Maximinus II**	1 May 305	May (?) 310	succeeded as augustus	Galerius (East)	Nephew	
	**Constantine I**	August 306 (Note: Self-proclaimed augustus, but only recognized as caesar by his fellow tetrarchs.)	May 310 (Note: Constantine was recognized as augustus by Maximian in September 307, but at the same time was excluded of the imperial college by Galerius, who did not recognize the rule of Maximian and Maxentius. Constantine regained the title of caesar (which he continued to unacknowledge) in November 308, at the Conference of Carnuntum.)	recognized as augustus	Galerius/Licinius (East)	Brothers-in-law	
	Licinius II	1 March 317	19 September 324	deposed	Licinius (East)	Son	
	Crispus	1 March 317	c. March 326	executed	Constantine I	Son	
	**Constantine II**	1 March 317	9 September 337	succeeded as augustus	Constantine I	Son	
	**Constantius II**	8 November 324	9 September 337	succeeded as augustus	Constantine I	Son	
	**Constans I**	25 December 333	9 September 337	succeeded as augustus	Constantine I	Son	
	Dalmatius	18 September 335	June/Aug. 337	murdered	Constantine I	Nephew	
	Decentius	July/August 350	18 August 353	committed suicide	Magnentius (West)	Brother	
	Constantius Gallus	15 March 351	Late 354	executed	Constantius II	Half-cousin	
	**Julian II**	6 November 355	3 November 361	succeeded as augustus	Constantius II	Cousin	
	**Constans II**	408	409 / 410	proclaimed augustus	Constantine III/Honorius (West)	Son/-	
	**Valentinian III**	23 October 424	23 October 425	proclaimed augustus	Theodosius II (East)	Half-cousin	
	Palladius	17 March 455	31 May 455	executed by Avitus	Maximus (West)	Son	
	Patricius	c. 470	c. 471	deposed or executed	Leo I (East)	Son-in-law	
	**Leo II**	c. October 472	17 November 473	proclaimed augustus	Leo I (East)	Son	
	**Marcus**	475	475	proclaimed augustus	Basiliscus (East)	Son	
	Basiliscus	476	477	executed	Zeno (East)	–	
	**Justinian I**	525	1 April 527	proclaimed augustus	Justin I	Adopted son	
	**Tiberius II**	7 December 574	26 September 578	proclaimed augustus	Justin II	Adopted son	
	Germanus	5 August 582	by 11 August 582	rejected the title	Tiberius II	Son-in-law	
	**Maurice**	5 August 582	13 August 582	proclaimed augustus	Tiberius II	Son-in-law	
	**Theodosius**	c. 587	26 March 590	proclaimed augustus	Maurice	Son	
	**Heraclonas**	1 January 632	4 July 638	proclaimed augustus	Heraclius	Son	
	**David Tiberius**	4 July 638	November 641	proclaimed augustus	Heraclius	Son	
	Martinus	4 July 638 (?)	November 641	deposed	Heraclius	Son	
	**Constans II**	c. February 641	c. July 641	title revoked (?), later proclaimed augustus	Heraclius Constantine	Son	
	Nikephoros and Christopher	1 April 769	25 December 780	title revoked	Constantine V	Sons	
	Alexios Mosele	831	842	retired	Theophilos	Son-in-law	
	Bardas	22 April 862	22 April 866	murdered	Michael III	Uncle	
	**Romanos I Lekapenos**	24 September 920	17 December 920	proclaimed augustus	Constantine VII	Father-in-law	
	Bardas Phokas the Elder	963	c. 968	died	Nikephoros II Phokas	Father	
	**Romanos III Argyros**	9 November 1028	11 November 1028	succeeded as augustus	Constantine VIII	Son-in-law	
	**Michael V Kalaphates**	1035	13 December 1041	succeeded as augustus	Michael IV the Paphlagonian	Nephew and adopted son	
	**Isaac I Komnenos**	c. 21 August 1057	30 August 1057	crowned emperor	Michael VI Bringas	Adopted son (tentative)	
	**John Doukas**	c. 1060	1074	proclaimed emperor (in opposition to Michael VII Doukas)	Constantine X Doukas Michael VII Doukas	Brother Uncle	

=== Byzantine nobles ===
After Alexios I Komnenos (r. 1081 – 1118) created the new title of sebastokrator for his brother Isaac Komnenos, caesar fell to second in the court hierarchy of titles and ceased to be used to designate potential heirs of the emperor. Alexios' grandson Manuel I Komnenos (r. 1143 – 1180) further devalued the title after bestowing the title of despotes upon his son-in-law and heir Béla-Alexios, demoting caesar to third place where it would remain until the Fall of Constantinople nearly three hundred years later.

- Nikephoros Bryennios the Younger, named by his father-in-law Alexios I
- Nikephoros Melissenos, named in 1080 by Alexios I
- Isaac Komnenos, named in 1104 by his father Alexios I
- John Rogerios Dalassenos, named c. 1130 by his father-in-law John II
- Renier of Montferrat, named in 1180 by his father-in-law Manuel I
- John Kantakouzenos, named in 1186 by Isaac II
- Conrad of Montferrat, named in 1187 by his father-in-law Isaac II
- Manuel Maurozomes, named c. 1200 by Alexios III
- Leo Gabalas, named by Theodore I Laskaris (r. 1205–1221)
- Constantine Palaiologos, named in 1259 by his brother Michael VIII
- Alexios Strategopoulos, named in 1259 by Michael VIII
- Roger de Flor, leader of the Catalan Company, named in 1304 by Andronikos II
- John Palaiologos, named in 1326 by his uncle Andronikos II

==== Byzantine Vassals ====
A number of foreign rulers were given the title of caesar as recognition of the emperor's authority whilst continuing to remain independent rulers.

- Tervel, khan of the Bulgars, named in 705 by Justinian II
- George II of Georgia, named in 1081 by his brother-in-law Nikephoros III
- Hrelja, likely named by John VI Kantakouzenos (r. 1347–1354)

=== Foreign Rulers ===
Serbian rulers

- Alexios Angelos Philanthropenos, named in 1373 by despot Thomas Preljubović
- Manuel Angelos Philanthropenos, named in 1390 by despot Esau de' Buondelmonti
- Grgur Golubić, named in 1347 by Stefan Uroš IV Dušan
- Vojihna, named in 1347 by Uroš IV
- Preljub, named in 1348–49 by Uroš IV
- Uglješa Vlatković, named by Uroš V
- Nikola Radonja, named by Uroš V
- Novak, named by Uroš V

Ottoman rulers

- Mehmed II (r. 1451–1481) assumed title kayser-i Rûm following the conquest of Constantinople in 1453
- Bayezid II (r. 1481–1512) is addressed as kayser in contemporary sources
- Suleiman I (r. 1520–1566) called himself "Caesar of Rome" in the inscription of Bender, Moldova, dating from c. 1538/39. In one of his poems, he also called himself "Roman caesar".
  - See List of sultans of the Ottoman Empire; the title kayser continued to be used as late as the 18th century.

== 17th-18th Century ==
The word Caesar inspired many modern names of leaders in European countries. Both the Russian Tsar and German Kaiser both come from Caesar. There is also (Polish) cesarz, (Czech) císař, (Dutch) keizer, and (Hungarian) császár, showing the huge impact Caesar and the Roman Empire had on Europe and more specifically the Balkans.

== See also ==
- Augustus (title)
- Imperator (title)

== Bibliography ==
- Barnes, Timothy D. (1984). Constantine and Eusebius. Harvard University Press. ISBN 0674165314.
- Bury, J. B.; Philotheus (1911). The Imperial Administrative System of the Ninth Century (With a Revised Text of the Kletorologion of Philotheos). London: Oxford University Press.
- Greenidge, A. H. J. (1901). Roman Public Life. London: Macmillan & Co.
- Hammond, Mason (1957). "Imperial Elements in the Formula of the Roman Emperors during the First Two and a Half Centuries of the Empire". Memoirs of the American Academy in Rome. 25: 19–64. doi:10.2307/4238646. JSTOR 4238646.
- Jones, A.H.M.; J.R. Martindale & J. Morris (1971–1992). Prosopography of the Later Roman Empire. Cambridge University Press. ISBN 0-521-07233-6.
- Kazhdan, Alexander, ed. (1991). The Oxford Dictionary of Byzantium. Oxford and New York: Oxford University Press. ISBN 0-19-504652-8.
- Kienast, Dietmar; Werner Eck; Matthäus Heil (2017). Römische Kaisertabelle: Grundzüge einer römischen Kaiserchronologie. Darmstadt: WBG. ISBN 978-3-534-26724-8.
- Peachin, Michael (1990). Roman Imperial Titulature and Chronology, A.D. 235–284. Amsterdam: Gieben. ISBN 90-5063-034-0.
- Verpeaux, Jean, ed. (1966). Pseudo-Kodinos, Traité des Offices (in French). Centre National de la Recherche Scientifique.
