= Battle of the Margus =

Battle during the Crisis of the Third Century

- Part of the Crisis of the Third Century
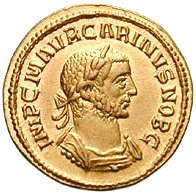
- Gold Roman coin (aureus) with the portrait of Emperor Carinus.
| Date | July 285 AD |
| Location | River Margus, Moesia |
| Result | Diocletian victory |

Belligerents
| Diocletian | Carinus † |

The Battle of the Margus or Battle of Margum was fought in July 285 for control of the Roman Empire between the armies of Diocletian and Carinus in the valley of the Margus River (today Great Morava) in Moesia (present day Serbia), probably near the settlement of Margum. The battle proved to be the tipping point that led to the eventual resolution of the Crisis of the Third Century and the return of stability to the Empire.

Carinus led the larger force, but the loyalty of his army was questionable. Carinus had allegedly alienated men whose support his success depended upon, including mistreating the Senate and its womenfolk and seducing the wives of his officers. The exact circumstances of the battle are uncertain, but it is known that Carinus was killed in the course of the battle, most probably by one of his own officers.

Diocletian was then left in sole control of the Roman Empire. The tide of the battle may have tilted to Carinus at first, only to shift in Diocletian's favor after the defection of Carinus' Praetorian Prefect, Aristobulus. Some scholars suspect that Aristobulus was the officer responsible for the murder of Carinus, an argument that gains credibility in the fact that Diocletian afterward rewarded Aristobulus by confirming him in office as Praetorian Prefect and Consul for the remainder of 285.

After his victory, Diocletian administered the oath of loyalty to Carinus' former troops, then turned his attention to the Danube frontier where the Marcomanni and Quadi were conducting raids across the border.
