= Carinus =

Roman emperor from 283 to 285

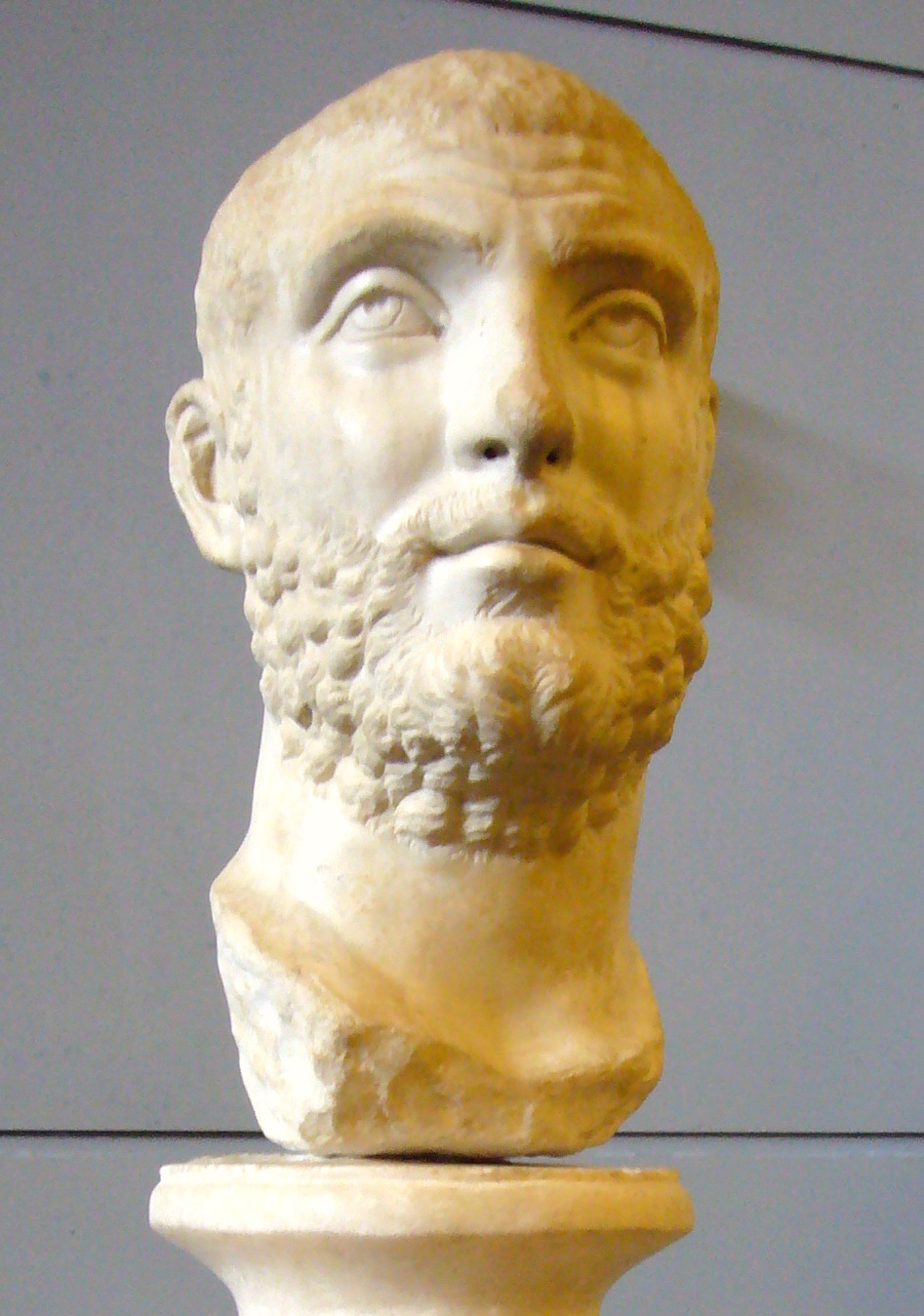
- Over life-sized head of Carinus, Centrale Montemartini

Roman emperor
- Reign: Spring 283 – July 285
- Predecessor: Carus
- Successor: Diocletian (in competition with Carinus from 284)
- Co-emperors: Carus (283); Numerian (283–284)
- Died: July 285; River Margus, Moesia
- Spouse: Magnia Urbica
- Issue: Nigrinianus (disputed, possibly adopted)
Names
- Marcus Aurelius Carinus
Regnal name
- Imperator Caesar Marcus Aurelius Carinus Augustus
- Father: Carus

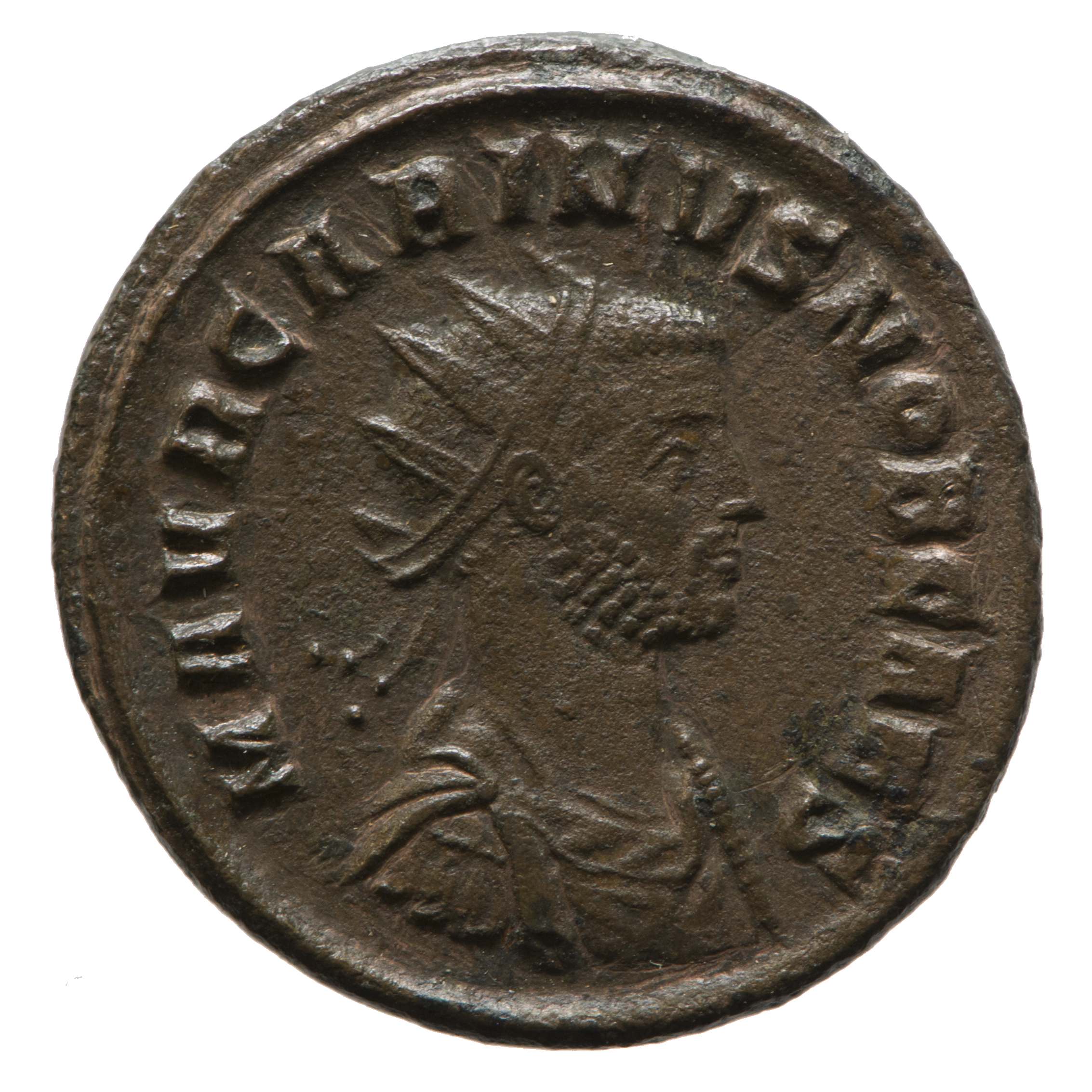
A Roman radiate produced in 283 depicting Emperor Carinus. From the collection of York Museums Trust. Legend: M. AVR. CARINVS NOB. CAES.

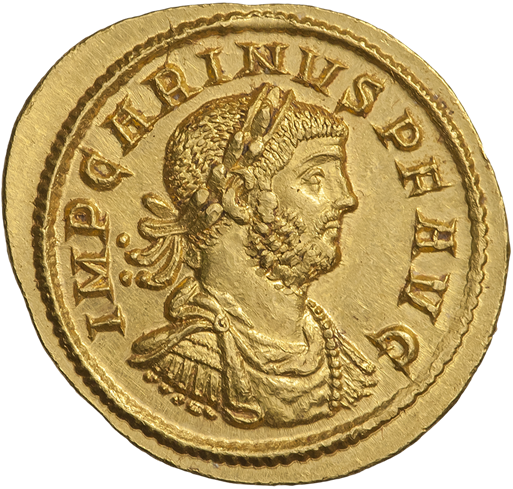
284 aureus

Marcus Aurelius Carinus (died 285) was Roman Emperor from 283 to 285. The eldest son of the Emperor Carus, he was first appointed Caesar in late 282, then given the title of Augustus in early 283, and made co-emperor of the western part of the Empire by his father. Official accounts of his character and career, which portray him as dissolute and incompetent, have been filtered through the propaganda of his successful opponent Diocletian.

== Reign ==
After the death of Emperor Probus in a spontaneous mutiny by the army in 282, his praetorian prefect, Carus, ascended to the throne. When he left for the Persian war, he elevated his two sons to the title of Caesar. The elder, Carinus, was left to manage the affairs of the West in his absence, and was later elevated to the rank of Augustus, while the younger, Numerian, accompanied his father to the East.

Carinus acquitted himself well, at least at first, showing some merit in suppressing unrest in Gaul and against the Quadi, but the young emperor soon left the defence of the Upper Rhine to his legates and returned to Rome, where the surviving accounts, which demonise him, claim he indulged in all manner of extravagance and excess. He is said to have married and divorced nine different women during his short reign in Rome and to have made his private life notorious. He is said to have persecuted many who he felt had treated him with insufficient respect before his elevation, to have alienated the Senate by his open dislike and contempt, and to have prostituted the imperial dignity with the various low entertainments he introduced at court.

When Carus heard of his son's behaviour in the capital, he declared his intention of removing him from office and replacing him with Constantius Chlorus, who was already known for his ability and virtue. Carus, however, died soon afterwards in the midst of the Persian War, and his two sons jointly succeeded him.

On his return to Rome, Carinus organised the annual games, the Ludi Romani, on an unprecedented scale. At the same time, Numerian was forced to abandon his father's ambitious campaign in the east by the soldiers, who were superstitious about Carus' death, supposedly caused by a bolt of lightning.

Numerian led his army back to Rome, where a triumph awaited him, leaving the Persians astonished at the inexplicable retreat of a victorious army. Numerian's health, however, was broken by the climate, and unable to bear the heat of the sun, he was carried on a covered litter on the march. Arrius Aper, the praetorian prefect, took charge in his name, but his ambitious temper aroused the troops' suspicions. At Heraclea in Thrace, they broke into the imperial tent and found Numerian dead. Diocletian, commander of the bodyguard, confirmed that Numerian had been murdered by the Prefect, and after executing him, he was proclaimed Emperor by the soldiers.

Carinus immediately left Rome and headed east to meet Diocletian. On his way through Pannonia he overthrew the usurper Sabinus Julianus and in July 285 met Diocletian's army at the Battle of the Margus River (modern Morava River) in Moesia.

=== Death in 285 ===
Historians disagree about what happened next. According to one account, his troops prevailed at the Battle of the Margus River, but Carinus was murdered by a tribune whose wife he had seduced. Another account describes the battle as a complete victory for Diocletian and claims that Carinus' army deserted him. This account may be supported by the fact that Diocletian kept Carinus' Praetorian Guard commander, Titus Claudius Aurelius Aristobulus, in service.

=== Character ===
Carinus has the reputation of being one of the worst Roman emperors. This infamy may have been encouraged by Diocletian. The unreliable Historia Augusta has Carinus marrying nine wives. After his death, Carinus' memory was officially condemned in the Roman procedure known as damnatio memoriae. His name and that of his wife were erased from inscriptions.

== Family tree ==
Marcus Claudius Tacitus; Roman Emperor; 275-276	previous Florianus; Roman Emperor; 276	Probus; Roman Emperor; 276-282	Carus; Roman Emperor; 282-283		next Diocletian; Roman Emperor; 284-305 ∞ Prisca
			Carinus; Roman Emperor; 282-285 ∞ Magnia Urbica	Numerian co-emperor 282-284	Galeria Valeria

== Sources ==
=== Roman sources ===
- Anonymous, Epitome de Caesaribus
- Aurelius Victor
- Eutropius, Breviarium ab urbe condita
- Historia Augusta, Life of Carus, Carinus and Numerian
- Joannes Zonaras, Compendium of History extract: Zonaras: Alexander Severus to Diocletian: 222–284

=== Secondary sources ===
- Altmayer, Klaus (2014). Die Herrschaft des Carus, Numerianus und Carinus als Vorläufer der Tetrarchie [The reigns of Carus, Numerianus and Carinus as precursors to the Tetrarchy]. Historia Einzelschriften. Vol. 230. Stuttgart: Franz Steiner. ISBN 978-3-515-10621-4.
- Williams, Stephen (1985). Diocletian and the Roman Recovery. London: B.T. Batsford. doi:10.4324/9780203461037. ISBN 0-7134-4605-6. Archived from the original on 19 March 2023.

== See also ==
- Mor Jokai's A Christian but a Roman is set in Carinus' Rome

Regnal titles
Preceded by Carus	Roman emperor 283–285; With: Carus (283) and Numerian (283–284)	Succeeded by Diocletian
Political offices
Preceded by Probus , Victorinus	Consul of the Roman Empire; 283–285 with Carus, Numerian , Diocletian, Bassus, T. Claudius Aurelius Aristobulus	Succeeded by Marcus Junius Maximus, Vettius Aquilinus
