= Titus Claudius Aurelius Aristobulus =

Roman soldier and bureaucrat

Titus Claudius Aurelius Aristobulus (fl. 285–296 AD) was a Roman soldier and politician who served as consul in 285 AD. He served two emperors, Carinus and Diocletian.

== Biography ==
Aristobulus first appears as the Praetorian prefect under the emperor Carinus in 285. That same year he was made consul posterior, serving alongside the emperor. He accompanied the emperor to the Battle of the Margus River, but ended up betraying Carinus and possibly even killing him on the battlefield, turning the tide of battle in favour of Carinus’ opponent, Diocletian. According to a contemporary source, the reason given for Aristobulus’ betrayal was for revenge – Carinus had forced Aristobulus’ wife to have an affair with him.

With the death of Carinus, the new emperor Diocletian rewarded Aristobulus by retaining him both as consul and as praetorian prefect for the remainder of the year.

Now a member of the senate, Aristobulus continued to flourish under the new regime. In 290, he was assigned as the Proconsular governor of Africa. His governorship was transferred to the new province of Byzacena during Diocletian's reorganization of the empire's provinces, which saw Africa Proconsularis divided into three smaller provinces. During his time as governor, Aristobulus undertook major building activities. His tenure as governor probably ended on 1 July 294, when he was replaced by Cassius Dio.

From 11 January 295 until 18 February 296, Aristobulus was the praefectus urbi of Rome.

== Sources ==
- Martindale, John R.; Jones, A. H. M.; Morris, John, eds. (1971). The Prosopography of the Later Roman Empire: Volume I, AD 260–395. Cambridge: Cambridge University Press. ISBN 0-521-07233-6.
- Southern, Pat, The Roman Empire from Severus to Constantine (2004)

Political offices
Preceded by Carinus II; Numerian	Roman consul 285 with Carinus III; Diocletian II	Succeeded by Marcus Junius Maximus II; Vettius Aquilinus
Preceded by Septimius Acindynus	Urban prefect of Rome; 295–296	Succeeded by Cassius Dio
