= Carus =

Roman emperor from 282 to 283

- Persicus Maximus
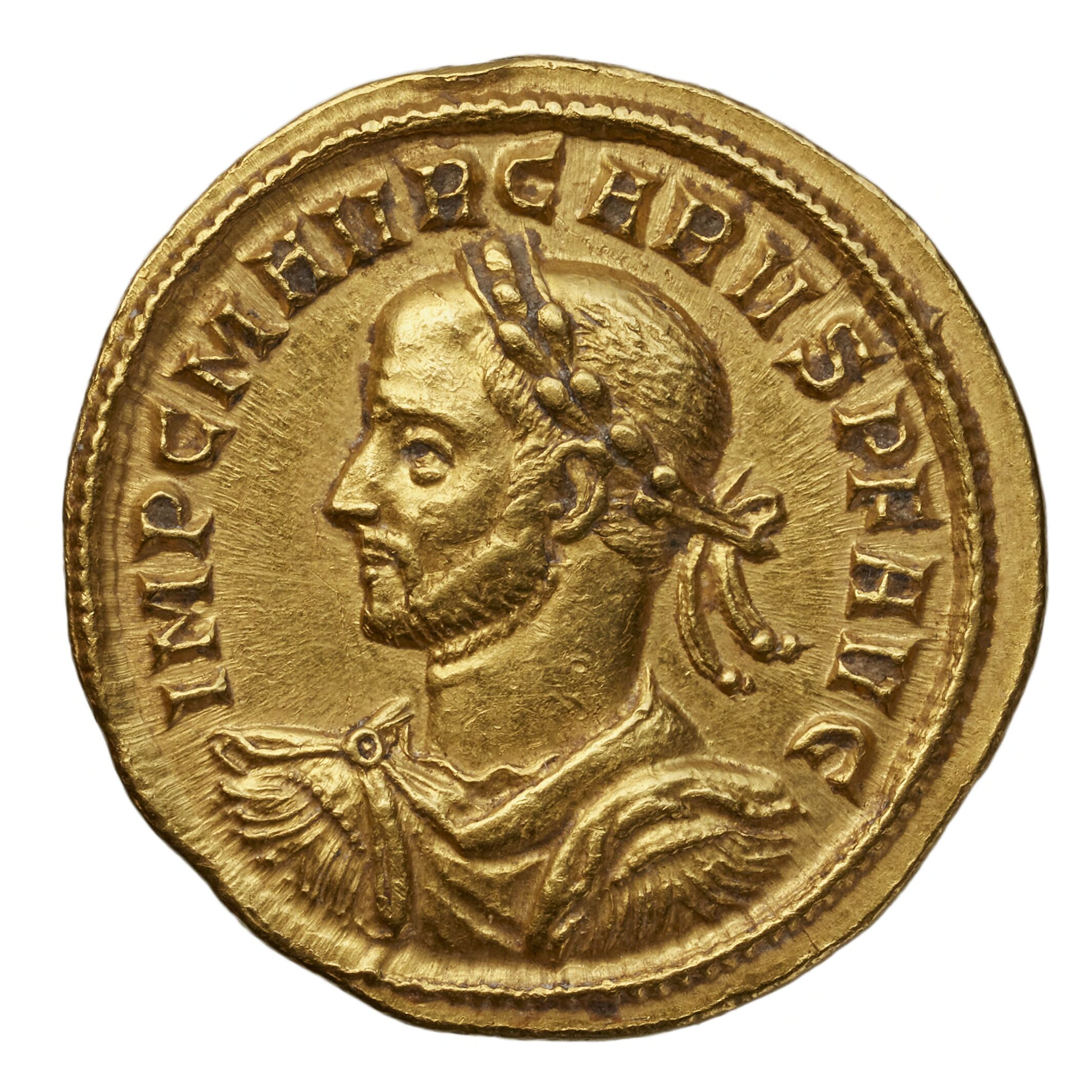
- Aureus of Carus, minted in Siscia

Roman emperor
- Reign: c. September 282 – c. July 283
- Predecessor: Probus
- Successor: Carinus and Numerian
- Co-emperor: Carinus (283)
- Born: c. 222; Narbo, Gallia Narbonensis (Modern day France)
- Died: July or August 283 (aged 61); Beyond the River Tigris, Sasanian Empire
- Issue: Carinus; Numerian; Paulina
Names
- Marcus Aurelius Numerius Carus (possibly)
Regnal name
- Imperator Caesar Marcus Aurelius Carus Augustus

Marcus Aurelius Carus (c. 282 – July or August 283) was Roman emperor from 282 to 283. During his short reign, Carus fought the Germanic tribes and Sarmatians along the Danube frontier with success.

He died while campaigning against the Sassanid Empire and is believed to have died of unnatural causes. It was reported that he had been struck by lightning. He was succeeded by his sons Carinus and Numerian, creating a dynasty which, though short-lived, provided further stability to the resurgent empire.

== Biography ==
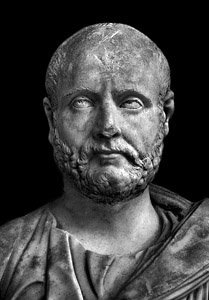
Possible bust of Carus in the Museo Archeologico Ostiense.

Carus, whose name before the accession may have been Marcus Numerius Carus, was born, according to differing accounts, either in Gaul, Illyricum or Africa. Modern scholarship inclines to the former view, placing his birth at Narbo (modern Narbonne) in Gallia Narbonensis, though he was educated in Rome. Little can be said with certainty of his life and rule. He was apparently a senator and filled various posts, both civil and military, before being appointed praetorian prefect by the emperor Probus in 282.

Two traditions surround his accession to the throne in August or September of 282. According to some mostly Latin sources, he was proclaimed emperor by the soldiers after the murder of Probus by a mutiny at Sirmium. Greek sources however claim that he rose against Probus in Raetia in a usurpation and had him killed. Allegedly, he initially refused the offer at first out of loyalty, but soon accepted. The often unreliable Historia Augusta is aware of both traditions, although it prefers the former. He does not seem to have returned to Rome after his accession, contenting himself with an announcement to the Senate. This was a marked departure from the constitutionalism of his immediate predecessors, Tacitus and Probus, who at least outwardly respected the authority of the senate, and was the precursor to the even more despotic military autocracy of Diocletian. Despite this, he still sought to deify the emperor Probus.

=== Campaign against the Sasanian Empire and death ===
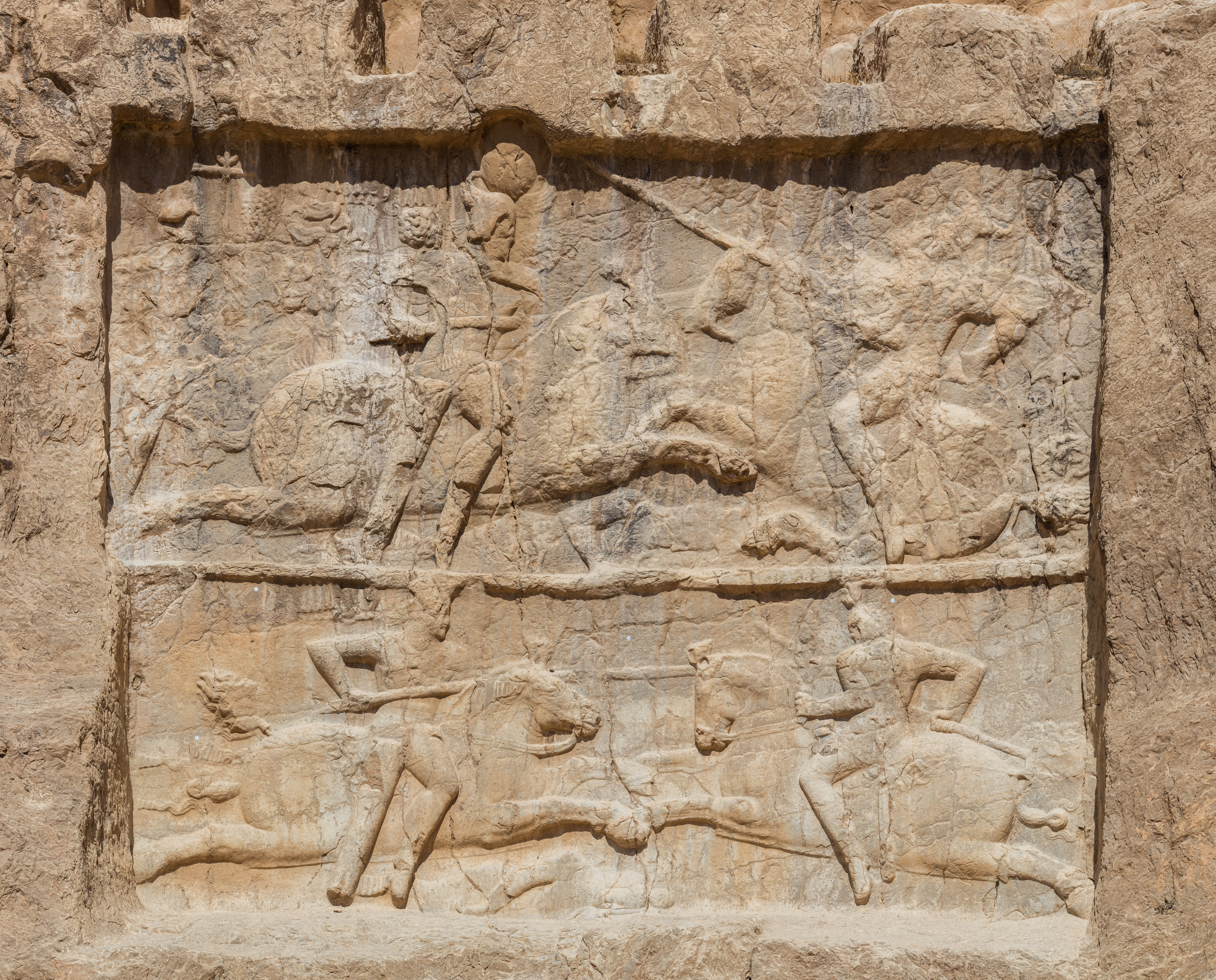
Panels at Naqsh-e Rustam, symbolizing the supposed victories of Bahram II over Carus (top) and Hormizd I Kushanshah (bottom).

Carus bestowed the title of Caesar upon his sons Carinus and Numerian, then, in the beginning of 283, he elevated Carinus to the rank of Augustus, leaving him in charge of the western portion of the empire to look after some disturbances in Gaul and took Numerian with him on an expedition against the Persians, which had been contemplated by Probus. During his first campaign as emperor, he inflicted a severe defeat on the Quadi and Sarmatians on the Danube, for which he was given the title Germanicus Maximus. Reportedly, 16,000 Quadi were killed, with 20,000 being taken prisoner. Carus then proceeded through Thrace and Asia Minor, annexed Mesopotamia, pressed on to Seleucia and Ctesiphon, and marched his soldiers beyond the Tigris.

The Sassanid King Bahram II, limited by internal opposition and his troops occupied with a campaign in modern-day Afghanistan, could not effectively defend his territory. The Sasanians, faced with severe internal problems, could not mount an effective coordinated defense at the time; Carus and his army may have captured the Sasanian capital of Ctesiphon. The victories of Carus avenged all the previous defeats suffered by the Romans against the Sassanids, and he received the title of Persicus Maximus. Rome's hopes of further conquest, however, were cut short by his death; Carus died in Sasanian territory, probably of unnatural causes, as he was reportedly struck by lightning. Alternate theories suggest that he died of illness, or that a rival for power poisoned him. Another theory hints at the future emperor Diocletian being involved in the killing. However, Leadbetter considered it unlikely for Carus to be assassinated, as his army had just won a victory.

== Legacy ==
Like the conquests of Trajan, 160 years before, Carus' gains were immediately relinquished by his successor. His son Numerian, naturally of an unwarlike disposition, was forced by the army to retreat over the Tigris.

In the sphere of civil affairs, Carus is remembered principally for the final suppression of the authority of the senate, which had been partially restored under Tacitus and Probus. He declined to accept their ratification of his election, informing them of the fact by a haughty and distant dispatch. He was the last emperor to have united a civil with a military education, in that age when the two were increasingly detached; Diocletian (Imp. 284–305), who succeeded Carus after the brief reign of the latter's sons, was to confirm and formalize the separation of professions, and the autocratic foundation of the imperial rule.

Though Carus was known throughout his life for his austere and virtuous manners, the suspicion of his complicity in Probus' death, along with his haughty conduct towards the senate, tarnished his reputation before his death, and Julian conspicuously placed him among the tyrants of Rome, in his catalogue of The Caesars.

== Family tree ==
previous Tacitus; Roman Emperor; 275–276	Florianus; Roman Emperor; 276	Probus; Roman Emperor; 276–282	Carus; Roman Emperor; 282–283		next Diocletian; Roman Emperor; 284–305 ∞ Prisca
			Carinus; Roman Emperor; 282–284	Numerian co-emperor 282–284	Galeria Valeria

== See also ==
- Crisis of the Third Century

== Sources ==
=== Primary sources ===
- Aurelius Victor, Epitome de Caesaribus
- Eutropius, Breviarium ab urbe condita
- Historia Augusta, Life of Carus, Carinus and Numerian
- Joannes Zonaras, Compendium of History extract: Zonaras: Alexander Severus to Diocletian: 222–284

=== Secondary sources ===
- Leadbetter, William, "Carus (282–283 A.D.)", DIR
- Jones, A.H.M.; J.R. Martindale & J. Morris (1971). The Prosopography of the Later Roman Empire Volume 1: A.D. 260–395. Cambridge University Press. ISBN 0-521-07233-6.
- Potter, David (2013). Constantine the Emperor. Oxford University Press. ISBN 978-0199755868.
- Southern, Pat. The Roman Empire from Severus to Constantine, Routledge, 2001

Regnal titles
Preceded by Probus	Roman emperor 282–283; With: Carinus (283)	Succeeded by Carinus; Numerian
Political offices
Preceded by Probus, Victorinus	Roman consul 283 with Carinus	Succeeded by Carinus, Numerian
