= Numerian =

Roman emperor from 283 to 284

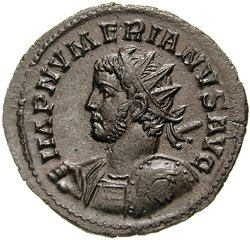
- Antoninianus of Numerian

Roman emperor
- Augustus Caesar: July 283 – November 284; 282 – July 283
- Predecessor: Carus
- Successor: Diocletian
- Co-emperors: Carinus (283–284)
- Died: November 284; Emesa
- Spouse: Daughter of Arrius Aper
Names
- Marcus Aurelius Numerius Numerianus; Marcus Aurelius Numerianus nobilissimus Caesar (282)
Regnal name
- Imperator Caesar Marcus Aurelius Numerianus Augustus
- Father: Carus

Numerian (Latin: Marcus Aurelius Numerius Numerianus; died November 284) was Roman emperor from 283 to 284 with his older brother Carinus. They were sons of Carus, a general raised to the office of praetorian prefect under Emperor Probus in 282.

== Early life and Carus' reign ==
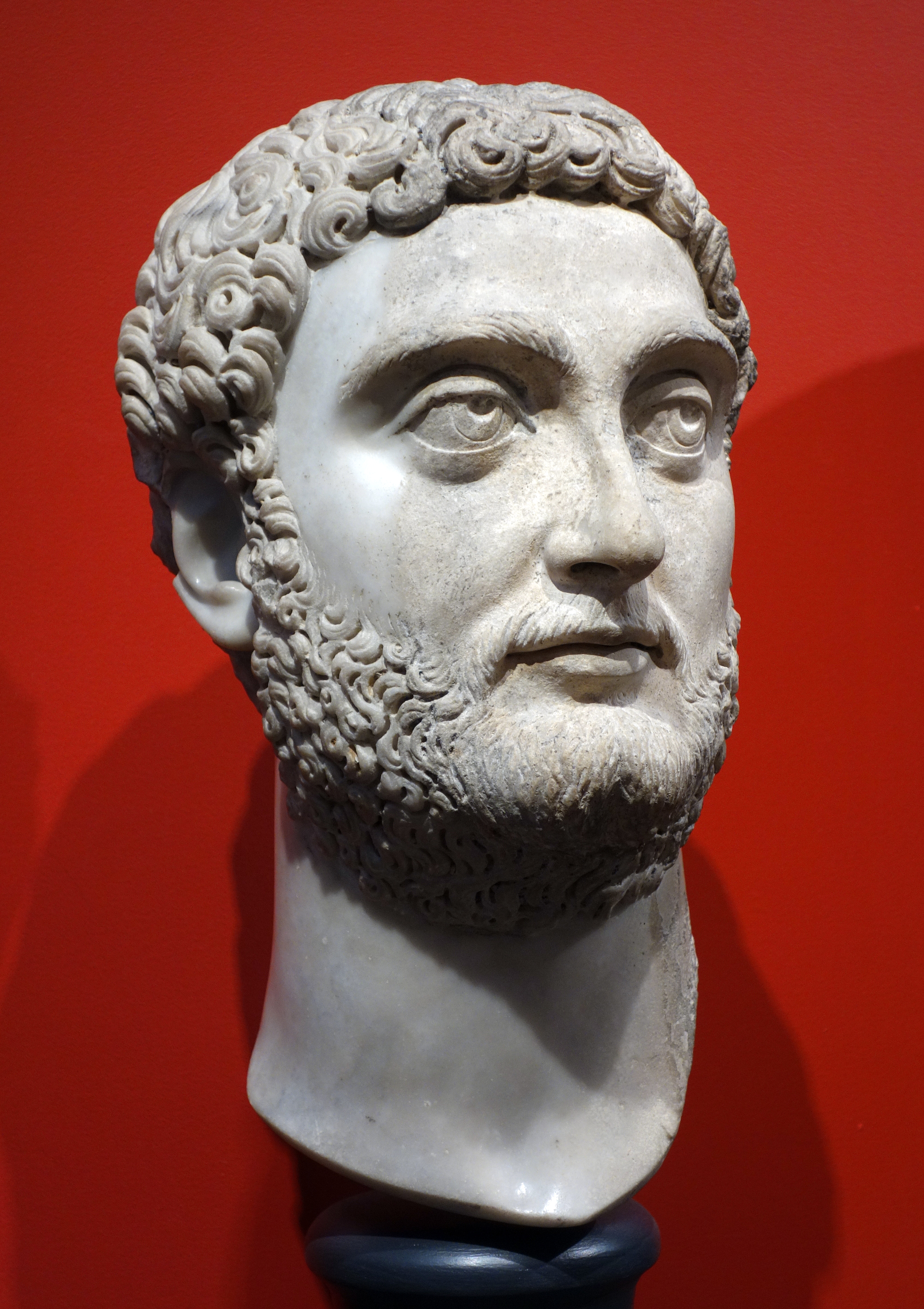
Possible portrait head of Numerian in the Museum of Fine Arts, Boston

Numerian was the younger son of Carus. In 282, the legions of the upper Danube in Raetia and Noricum proclaimed as emperor Numerian's father, the praetorian prefect Marcus Aurelius Carus, after a mutiny against the emperor Probus, in which the latter was killed. By one account, Carus had himself rebelled against the emperor, and Probus' army, stationed in Sirmium (Sremska Mitrovica, Serbia), decided they did not wish to fight Carus and assassinated their emperor instead. According to the Historia Augusta, Carus was not responsible for Probus's death, and inflicted severe punishment upon the murderers. Carus, already sixty, wished to establish a dynasty and immediately elevated Carinus and Numerian to the rank of Caesar.

In 283, Carus left Carinus in charge of the West and moved with Numerian and his praetorian prefect Arrius Aper to the East to wage war against the Sassanid Empire. The Sassanids had been embroiled in a succession dispute since the death of Shapur and were in no position to oppose Carus' advance.

According to Zonaras, Eutropius, and Festus, Carus won a major victory against the Persians, taking Seleucia and the Sassanid capital of Ctesiphon (near modern Al-Mada'in, Iraq), cities on opposite banks of the Tigris. In celebration, Numerian, Carus, and Carinus all took the title Persici maximi. Carus died in July or early August of 283, allegedly due to a strike of lightning.

=== Numerian and Carinus as Augusti ===
The death of Carus left Numerian and Carinus as the new Augusti. Carinus quickly made his way to Rome from Gaul, arriving in January 284, while Numerian lingered in the East. The Roman retreat from Persia was orderly and unopposed, for the Persian King, Bahram II, was still struggling to establish his authority.

By March 284, Numerian had only reached Emesa (Homs) in Syria; by November, only Asia Minor. In Emesa he was apparently still alive and in good health, as he issued the only extant rescript in his name there. Coins were issued in his name in Cyzicus at some time before the end of 284, but it is impossible to know whether he was still in the public eye by that point.

After Emesa, Numerian's staff, including the prefect Aper, reported that Numerian suffered from an inflammation of the eyes and had to travel in a closed coach. When the army reached Bithynia, or Thrace, some of Numerian's soldiers smelled an odor reminiscent of a decaying corpse emanating from the coach. They opened its curtains and found Numerian dead.

=== After Numerian's death ===
Aper officially broke the news of Numerian's death in Nicomedia (İzmit) in November 284, and the discovery, which the prefect attempted to conceal, as due to the forwardness of the soldiery, who forced open the Imperial tent to investigate for themselves the situation of their invisible monarch. Numerian's generals and tribunes called a council for the succession, which met at Chalcedon across the Bosphorus, where they chose as emperor Diocletian, commander of the cavalry arm of the imperial bodyguard, despite Aper's attempts to garner support. The army of the east unanimously saluted their new Augustus. Diocletian accepted the purple imperial vestments and raised his sword to the light of the sun, swearing an oath denying responsibility for Numerian's death. He asserted that Aper had killed Numerian and concealed the deed. In full view of the army, Diocletian then turned and killed Aper, who had been hauled bound before the assembly.

== Character ==
According to the Historia Augusta, Numerian was a man of considerable literary attainments, remarkably amiable, and known as a great orator and poet. Allegedly, the Senate raised him a statue, inscribed: "To the most powerful of orators".

== Citations ==
Regnal titles
| Preceded by Carus | Roman emperor 283–284; With: Carinus | Succeeded by Carinus (until 285) and Diocletian |
Political offices
| Preceded by Carus , Carinus | Consul of the Roman Empire; 284 with Carinus | Succeeded by Diocletian, Titus Claudius Aurelius Aristobulus |
