= 280s =

The 280's decade ran from January 1, 280, to December 31, 289. The Crisis of the Third Century ends in this decade.

== Events ==
=== 280 ===
==== By place ====
====== Roman Empire ======
- Roman usurper Proculus starts a rebellion at Lugdunum (Lyon, France), and proclaims himself emperor.
- Emperor Probus drives the Alans off to Asia Minor and suppresses the revolt in Gaul; Proculus is executed.
- The Germans destroy the Roman fleet on the Rhine; Bonosus is proclaimed emperor at Colonia Agrippina (Cologne).
- Probus defeats the army under Bonosus. Bonosus sees no way out and hangs himself. His family is treated with honours.
- Julius Saturninus, governor of Syria, is in Alexandria, charged with the defense of the East. He is declared emperor and withdraws to Apamea. Probus besieges the city and puts him to death.
- Roman territory is under constant threat of raids from Franks. The cities in Gaul are reinforced with defensive walls.

====== Europe ======
- The Thuringii, a Germanic tribe, appears in the Harz Mountains (Thuringia) of central Germania.

====== China ======
- Emperor Wu of the Jin dynasty completes the unification of China, which was previously divided between three contending powers during the Three Kingdoms period. The Jin dynasty's capital of Luoyang becomes a thriving centre of commerce as foreign diplomats and traders travel there.

====== Persia ======
- King Bahram II of the Sassanid Empire (Persia) sends envoys to seek peaceful relations with Rome.

====== India ======
- The Gupta Empire (India) is founded (approximate date).

=== 281 ===
==== By place ====
====== Roman Empire ======
- Emperor Probus returns to Rome, where he celebrates his triumph over the Vandals and the usurpers (Bonosus, Julius Saturninus and Proculus).
- Tiberianus served his first of two terms as Consul.

=== 282 ===
==== By place ====
====== Roman Empire ======
- Emperor Probus travels towards Sirmium (Serbia). He tries to employ his troops in peaceful projects, such as draining the swamps in Pannonia.
- The praetorian prefect Marcus Aurelius Carus usurps power in Raetia. Probus attempts to organise a campaign against Carus but is murdered by his discontented troops in Sirmium.
- Carus defeats the Quadi and Sarmatians on the Danube; for his victories he is given the title Germanicus Maximus.
- Carus appoints his sons Carinus and Numerian as Caesar.

====== China ======
- A new city is constructed in Fuzhou, slightly south of the original city Ye (the main street of the city has remained unchanged since that time).

==== By topic ====
====== Religion ======
- The Patriarch Theonas of Alexandria becomes one of the first bishops to use the title Pope.

=== 283 ===
==== By place ====
====== Roman Empire ======
- Spring: Emperor Carus makes his son Carinus the Augustus in the west.
- Exploiting the Persian civil war, Carus leaves Carinus in charge of much of the Roman Empire and, accompanied by his younger son Numerian, invades the Sassanid Empire. They sack Seleucia and Ctesiphon, the capital of the Persian kingdom, and they press on beyond the Tigris. For his victories, Carus receives the title of Persicus Maximus.
- The officer Diocles, the future Emperor Diocletian, distinguishes himself in the war against the Persians.
- Carinus campaigns with success in Britain and on the Rhine frontier.
- Summer: Carus dies in mysterious circumstances during the war against the Persians. Various sources claim he died of illness, was struck by lightning or was killed in combat.
- Carinus and Numerian succeed their father Carus. Numerian, who had accompanied his father into the Persian Empire, leads the army back to Roman territory.
- The corrector Aurelius Julianus usurps power in Pannonia but is defeated by Carinus.

====== Persian Empire ======
- The King of Kings Bahram II fights a civil war against his brother Hormizd, the king of Sakastan.

==== By topic ====
====== Religion ======
- December 17 – Pope Caius succeeds Eutychian as the 28th pope of Rome.

=== 284 ===
==== By place ====
====== Roman Empire ======
- Emperor Numerian travels through Bithynia (Asia Minor) on his way home to Rome. Suffering from an inflammation of the eyes, he travels in a closed litter in which soldiers find his decaying corpse.
- November 17 – Diocletian becomes emperor of Rome
- November 20 – The commander of Numerian's domestici (household troops), Diocles, is chosen to be the new emperor. In a military assembly outside Nicomedia (modern İzmit, Turkey), Diocles claims that the praetorian prefect (and rival for the throne) Arrius Aper murdered Numerian, and he personally stabs and kills the prefect on the spot. The new emperor changes his name to the Latinised 'Diocletian'. Building on existing trends, Diocletian presents his rule as that of a god-like dominus or autocrat.
- Sabinus Julianus, the praetorian prefect of Emperor Carinus, exploits the instability and usurps the throne in northern Italy.

====== Persian Empire ======
- King of Kings Bahram II installs Mirian III, of the House of Mihran, on the throne of the Kingdom of Iberia. Mirian would rule the kingdom until his death in c. 361.

====== Korea ======
- Yurye becomes king of the Korean kingdom of Silla.

==== By topic ====
====== Religion ======
- Rufinus succeeds Dometius as Bishop of Byzantium.

=== 285 ===
==== By place ====
====== Roman Empire ======
- Spring – Emperor Carinus marches from Britain to northern Italy, and defeats the army of usurper Sabinus Julianus at Verona.
- Summer – Battle of the Margus: Emperor Diocletian defeats the forces of Carinus in the valley of the Margus (Serbia). Numerous soldiers desert Carinus during the battle. Carinus then flees to the Pannonian fort of Cornacum, but he is soon slain by his officers.
- July 21 or July 25 – Diocletian appoints his fellow-officer Maximian to the office of caesar, or junior co-emperor.
- Carausius, naval commander at Bononia (modern-day Boulogne), is given the task of clearing the English Channel of Frankish and Saxon pirates.
- Maximian is sent to pacify Gaul, where the Bagaudae, a band of peasants, are revolting against the Roman Empire.

=== 286 ===
==== By place ====
====== Roman Empire ======
- Winter/Spring: The Caesar Maximian defeats the Bagaudae rebellion in Gaul. He then defeats a Germanic invasion into Gaul, defeating an army of Burgundians and Alemanni and another army of Chaibones and Heruli.
- Emperor Diocletian campaigns successfully against Sarmatian raids. The future emperor Constantius defeats the 'Bosporian Sarmatians'.
- April 1 – Diocletian rewards Maximian by elevating him to co-emperor, giving him the title Augustus.
- Summer: Carausius, commander of the Classis Britannica, is accused of piracy by Maximian and is sentenced to death. He responds by declaring himself emperor of Britain and Northwestern Gaul. His forces consist of the newly built Roman fleet and three legions in Britain. The Carausian Revolt is supported by Gaulish merchant ships and Frankish mercenaries.

====== Asia ======
- Tuoba Chuo succeeds his brother Tuoba Xilu as chieftain of the Tuoba clan.
- Chaekgye becomes king of the Korean kingdom of Baekje.

=== 287 ===
==== By place ====
====== Roman Empire ======
- On the same day that he is made consul, Maximian launches a campaign against an invasion of Gaul by the Alemanni. After defeating this invasion, he then invades Alemannia itself, entering across the Upper Rhine and returning to Roman territory via the Upper Danube.
- Around this time, the future emperor Constantius defeats and captures a Germanic king, the latter having prepared an ambush against the Romans.
- Diocletian signs a peace treaty with King Bahram II of Persia, and installs the pro-Roman Arsacid Tiridates III as king over the western portion of Armenia.
- Diocletian re-organizes the Mesopotamian frontier, and fortifies various locations including the city of Circesium (modern Busayrah) on the Euphrates. Around this time, he begins the construction of the Strata Diocletiana. Throughout his reign, similar fortification efforts are conducted on the other frontiers as well, with fortifications constructed or restored behind, on and beyond the borders. Conscription and the number of legions increase, although the legions themselves are reformed into smaller and more flexible units. At some point in time, Diocletian may have also established the late Roman military system of Comitatenses (field army units) and Limitanei (border units), but some scholars date this development to the reign of Constantine I (r. 306–337).
- September – The first Indiction begins.

=== 288 ===
==== By place ====
====== Roman Empire ======
- Emperor Diocletian launches a campaign into Germanic territory from the province of Raetia (Switzerland).
- Around this time, an army loyal to Maximian, probably led by the future emperor Constantius, defeats the usurper Carausius or his Frankish allies in northern Gaul. In this or the following year, Carausius withdraws his military forces and administrative presence from Gaul, confining himself to Roman Britain.
- Maximian makes an alliance with the Frankish king Gennobaudes.
- Far from Carausius' fleet, in the rivers of Gaul, Maximian builds a fleet to contest control of the North Sea and re-take Britain.
- Around this time, Constantius marries Maximian's stepdaughter, Theodora, and it may also be around this time that the general Galerius marries Diocletian's daughter Galeria Valeria.

=== 289 ===
==== By place ====
====== Roman Empire ======
- In this or the following year, Emperor Diocletian campaigns with success against the Sarmatians. The future emperor Galerius may have distinguished himself during this campaign.
- In this or the following year, Maximian attempts to reconquer Britain from the usurper Carausius but is defeated at sea.

== Births ==
280

- Saint George, Roman soldier and Christian martyr (approximate date)
- Yao Yizhong, Chinese general and warlord (d. 352)

281

- Cai Mo (or Daoming), Chinese official and politician (d. 356)
- Theodore Stratelates, Roman general and martyr (d. 319)

283

- Eusebius of Vercelli, Christian bishop and saint (d. 371)
- Ge Hong, Chinese scholar and philosopher (d. 343)

284

- Fu Hong (or Pu Hong), Chinese general and prince (d. 350)
- Huai of Jin, Chinese emperor of the Jin Dynasty (d. 313)

285

- St. Sylvester, Italian bishop (d. 335)

288

- Li Ban, Chinese emperor of Cheng Han (d. 334)
- Wen Jiao (or Taizhen), Chinese politician (d. 329)

289

- Flavia Maxima Fausta, Roman empress (d. 326)
- Yu Liang (or Yuangui), Chinese politician (d. 340)

== Deaths ==
280

- Bonosus, Roman general and usurper
- Cen Hun, Chinese official and politician
- Julius Saturninus, Roman usurper
- Kang Senghui, Chinese monk and translator
- Lu Jing, Chinese general and writer (b. 250)
- Maharaja Sri-Gupta of the Gupta Empire
- Yu Zhong (or Shifang), Chinese general
- Zhang Ti (or Juxian), Chinese chancellor

281

- Proculus, Roman general and usurper

282

- Huangfu Mi (or Shi'an), Chinese historian (b. 215)
- Jia Chong, Chinese politician and statesman (b. 217)
- Marcus Aurelius Probus, Roman emperor (b. 232)
- Xue Ying (or Daoyan), Chinese politician and poet

283

- December 7 – Etychian, bishop of Rome
- Marcus Aurelius Carus, Roman emperor (b. 224)
- Shan Tao, Chinese scholar and politician (b. 205)
- Sima You (or Dayou), Chinese prince (b. 248)
- Sima Zhou (or Zijiang), Chinese prince (b. 227)

284

- November 20 – Numerian, Roman emperor (b. 254)
- Lucius Flavius Aper, Roman general and praetorian prefect
- Sun Hao, Chinese emperor of the Eastern Wu state (b. 243)

285

- Marcus Aurelius Carinus, Roman consul and emperor
- Du Yu (or Yuankai), Chinese general and politician (b. 222)
- Sabinus Julianus, Roman usurper (approximate date)

286

- Crispin and Crispinian, Roman cobblers and martyrs
- Domnina of Anazarbus, Christian martyr and saint
- Mark and Marcellian, Christian martyrs (approximate date)
- Tuoba Xilu, chieftain of the Tuoba clan (modern Mongolia)

287

- Justa and Rufina, Christian martyrs
- Maurice (or Mauritius), Christian martyr
- Quentin, Christian missionary and martyr
- Valerius and Rufinus, Christian martyrs
- Victoricus, Fuscian, and Gentian, Christian martyrs

288

- Maximilian of Lorch, Christian missionary and martyr
- Sebastian, Roman soldier and Christian martyr
- Teng Xiu, Chinese general and governor

289

- Alexander of Rome, Christian martyr
- Kyriaki the Great, Christian martyr
- Xun Xu (or Gongzeng), Chinese official
