= 281 =

281 in various calendars
- Gregorian calendar: 281; CCLXXXI
- Ab urbe condita: 1034
- Assyrian calendar: 5031
- Balinese saka calendar: 202–203
- Bengali calendar: −313 – −312
- Berber calendar: 1231
- Buddhist calendar: 825
- Burmese calendar: −357
- Byzantine calendar: 5789–5790
- Chinese calendar: 庚子年 (Metal Rat); 2978 or 2771 — to — 辛丑年 (Metal Ox); 2979 or 2772
- Coptic calendar: −3 – −2
- Discordian calendar: 1447
- Ethiopian calendar: 273–274
- Hebrew calendar: 4041–4042
- Hindu calendars
- Vikram Samvat: 337–338
- Shaka Samvat: 202–203
- Kali Yuga: 3381–3382
- Holocene calendar: 10281
- Iranian calendar: 341 BP – 340 BP
- Islamic calendar: 352 BH – 350 BH
- Javanese calendar: 160–161
- Julian calendar: 281; CCLXXXI
- Korean calendar: 2614
- Minguo calendar: 1631 before ROC 民前1631年
- Nanakshahi calendar: −1187
- Seleucid era: 592/593 AG
- Thai solar calendar: 823–824
- Tibetan calendar: ལྕགས་ཕོ་བྱི་བ་ལོ་ (male Iron-Rat); 407 or 26 or −746 — to — ལྕགས་མོ་གླང་ལོ་ (female Iron-Ox); 408 or 27 or −745

Year 281 (CCLXXXI) was a common year starting on Saturday of the Julian calendar. At the time, it was known as the Year of the Consulship of Probus and Tiberianus (or, less frequently, year 1034 Ab urbe condita). The denomination 281 for this year has been used since the early medieval period, when the Anno Domini calendar era became the prevalent method in Europe for naming years. The year comes after 280 and Comes before 282.

== Events ==
=== By place ===
==== Roman Empire ====
- Emperor Probus returns to Rome, where he celebrates his triumph over the Vandals and the usurpers (Bonosus, Julius Saturninus and Proculus).
- Tiberianus served his first of two terms as Consul.

==== China ====
- The tombs of King Zhao of Zhou and King Mu of Zhou were "rifled".

== Births ==
- Cai Mo (or Daoming), Chinese official and politician (d. 356)
- Theodore Stratelates, Roman general and martyr (d. 319)

== Deaths ==
- Proculus, Roman general and usurper
