= 280 =

280 in various calendars
- Gregorian calendar: 280; CCLXXX
- Ab urbe condita: 1033
- Assyrian calendar: 5030
- Balinese saka calendar: 201–202
- Bengali calendar: −314 – −313
- Berber calendar: 1230
- Buddhist calendar: 824
- Burmese calendar: −358
- Byzantine calendar: 5788–5789
- Chinese calendar: 己亥年 (Earth Pig); 2977 or 2770 — to — 庚子年 (Metal Rat); 2978 or 2771
- Coptic calendar: −4 – −3
- Discordian calendar: 1446
- Ethiopian calendar: 272–273
- Hebrew calendar: 4040–4041
- Hindu calendars
- Vikram Samvat: 336–337
- Shaka Samvat: 201–202
- Kali Yuga: 3380–3381
- Holocene calendar: 10280
- Iranian calendar: 342 BP – 341 BP
- Islamic calendar: 353 BH – 352 BH
- Javanese calendar: 159–160
- Julian calendar: 280; CCLXXX
- Korean calendar: 2613
- Minguo calendar: 1632 before ROC 民前1632年
- Nanakshahi calendar: −1188
- Seleucid era: 591/592 AG
- Thai solar calendar: 822–823
- Tibetan calendar: ས་མོ་ཕག་ལོ་ (female Earth-Boar); 406 or 25 or −747 — to — ལྕགས་ཕོ་བྱི་བ་ལོ་ (male Iron-Rat); 407 or 26 or −746

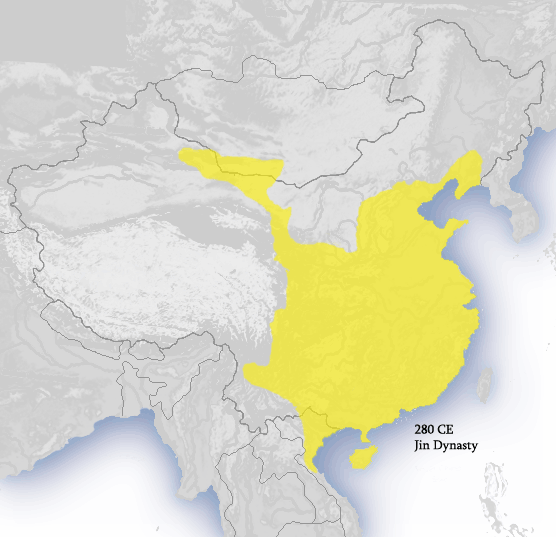
Western Jin Dynasty (280)

Year 280 (CCLXXX) was a leap year starting on Thursday of the Julian calendar. At the time, it was known as the Year of the Consulship of Messalla and Gratus (or, less frequently, year 1033 Ab urbe condita). The denomination 280 for this year has been used since the early medieval period, when the Anno Domini calendar era became the prevalent method in Europe for naming years.

== Events ==
=== By place ===
==== Roman Empire ====
- Roman usurper Proculus starts a rebellion at Lugdunum (Lyon, France), and proclaims himself emperor.
- Emperor Probus drives the Alans off to Asia Minor and suppresses the revolt in Gaul; Proculus is executed.
- The Germans destroy the Roman fleet on the Rhine; Bonosus is proclaimed emperor at Colonia Agrippina (Cologne).
- Probus defeats the army under Bonosus. Bonosus sees no way out and hangs himself. His family is treated with honours.
- Julius Saturninus, governor of Syria, is in Alexandria, charged with the defense of the East. He is declared emperor and withdraws to Apamea. Probus besieges the city and puts him to death.
- Roman territory is under constant threat of raids from Franks. The cities in Gaul are reinforced with defensive walls.

==== Europe ====
- The Thuringi, a Germanic tribe, appears in the Harz Mountains (Thuringia) of central Germania.

==== China ====
- Emperor Wu of the Jin dynasty completes the unification of China, which was previously divided between three contending powers during the Three Kingdoms period. The Jin dynasty's capital of Luoyang becomes a thriving centre of commerce as foreign diplomats and traders travel there.

==== Persia ====
- King Bahram II of the Sassanid Empire (Persia) sends envoys to seek peaceful relations with Rome.

==== India ====
- The Gupta Empire (India) is founded (approximate date).

== Births ==
- Yao Yizhong, Chinese general and warlord (d. 352)
- Approximate date – Saint George, Cappadocian Greek-born Roman soldier and Christian martyr

== Deaths ==
- Early – Yu Zhong (or Shifang), Chinese general, killed in action
- March 23 – Lu Jing, Chinese general and writer, killed in action (b. 250)
- April 4 – Zhang Ti (or Juxian), Chinese chancellor
- c. April – Cen Hun, Chinese official and politician
- Bonosus, Roman general and usurper, suicide
- Kang Senghui, Chinese monk and translator
- 280 or 281 – Julius Saturninus, Roman usurper
- Approximate date – Gupta, founder of the Gupta Empire
