= 300s (decade) =

Decade

The 300s decade ran from January 1, 300, to December 31, 309.

== Events ==
=== 300 ===
==== By place ====
====== Roman Empire ======
- Emperor Diocletian begins construction of a palace that will become the city of Split (approximate date). Diocletian, who plans on abdicating, intends to use this palace as his place of retirement.
- Caesar Constantius I wins a victory over the Franks (approximate date).

====== Asia ======
- The lion becomes extinct from Armenia (approximate date).
- The Yayoi period ends in Ancient Japan (approximate date).
- Wootz steel is developed in India (approximate date).
- The Kama Sutra, an Indian handbook on the art of sexual love, is probably produced around this time by the sage Vatsyayana.
- Micheon becomes ruler of the Korean kingdom of Goguryeo.

====== Africa ======
- The elephant becomes extinct in North Africa (approximate date).
- The Atlas wild ass becomes extinct (approximate date).

====== Mesoamerica ======
- The Formative/Preclassic period in Mesoamerica comes to an end approximately around this year.
- The Mayan civilization reaches its most prolific period, the classic period, in what is now Guatemala, Belize and parts of southern Mexico adjacent to the former two. During most of this period, Tikal dominates the Mayan world.

==== By topic ====
====== Art and Science ======
- The magnetic compass for navigation is invented in China (approximate date).
- The Panchatantra, a Sanskrit collection of fables and fairy tales, is written in India.
- The Tetrarchs are probably made in Egypt. After 330 they are moved to Constantinople and in 1204 they are installed at the corner of the facade of the St Mark's Basilica, Venice (approximate date).
- Diocletian's Palace, Split, Croatia, is built. Its model is nowadays kept at the Museo della Civilta Romana, Rome.

====== Religion ======
- Peter of Alexandria becomes Patriarch of Alexandria.
- Possible date of the Codex Vaticanus Graecus 1209 and Codex Sinaiticus, manuscripts of the Bible written in Greek.
- Approximate date of the Synod of Elvira in Elvira, Spain, which prohibits interaction with Jews, pagans, and heretics.

=== 301 ===
==== By place ====
====== Roman Empire ======
- Caesar Galerius begins a major war against the Carpi and Bastarnae and wins the first of several victories.
- September: Emperor Diocletian issues a reform that revalues the Roman currency.
- November: Diocletian issues his Edict on Maximum Prices, which, rather than halting rampant inflation, causes widespread panic and an increase in inflation. The measure is quickly abandoned.

====== Armenia ======
- King Tiridates III (the Great) proclaims Christianity as the official state religion, making Armenia the first nation to adopt Christianity as its official religion (traditional date). Construction of the original Etchmiadzin Cathedral by Gregory the Illuminator begins.

====== Europe ======
- September 3 – The republic of San Marino is established (approximate date).

====== Asia ======
- February 3 – May 30 – Sima Lun briefly usurps the Jin Dynasty.

=== 302 ===
==== By place ====
====== Roman Empire ======
- Emperor Diocletian persecutes the Manichaeans, accusing them of being a Persian fifth column.
- Caesar Galerius wins his second victory over the Carpi.
- An invasion of Gaul by the Alemannic Lingones almost traps Caesar Constantius I between the enemy and the walls of a town. Constantius himself is carried onto the wall via a crane. However, within the same day, Constantius sallies forth from the walls and defeats the enemy in a major battle.

====== Persia ======
- Narseh, ruler (Shahanshah) of the Sassanid Empire, dies after a 9-year reign. He is succeeded by his son Hormizd II.

==== By topic ====
====== Art and Science ======
- Iamblichus of Chalcis writes a treatise on magic and the occult.

====== Religion ======
- Gregory the Illuminator is consecrated as Patriarch of Armenia by Leontius of Caesarea.

=== 303 ===
==== By place ====
====== Roman Empire ======
- Great Persecution: Emperor Diocletian launches the last and largest major persecution of Christians in the Empire. Caesar Galerius and Hierocles are said to have been the instigators. In a series of four edicts published from February 23, 303, to 304, the Christians are forbidden to worship in groups, are made to perform sacrifices, and must surrender sacred texts. Churches are destroyed, and the clergy are arrested en masse. The persecution lasts in some parts of the empire until 313, and thousands of Christians are killed. Those put to death include Agnes of Rome, a 12-year-old Christian girl who has refused marriage and consecrated her virginity to God. Hailed as a martyr, she will be honored as the patron saint of chastity, gardeners, rape victims and virgins.
- September 25 – On a voyage preaching the gospel, Saint Fermin of Pamplona is beheaded in Amiens (Modern day France).
- November 20 – The Augusti Diocletian and Maximian reunite in Rome to celebrate the 20th anniversary of Diocletian's accession, which is now treated as a joint anniversary for both emperors. A series of columns in the Roman Forum and a triumphal arch are dedicated to the emperors. The two emperors also agree on a plan of abdication.
- Galerius wins his third victory over the Carpi and is perhaps joined on campaign by Diocletian. The Arch of Galerius is dedicated in Thessaloniki.
- Caesar Constantius I wins a victory over Germanic invaders in the battle of Vindonissa.

====== Armenia ======
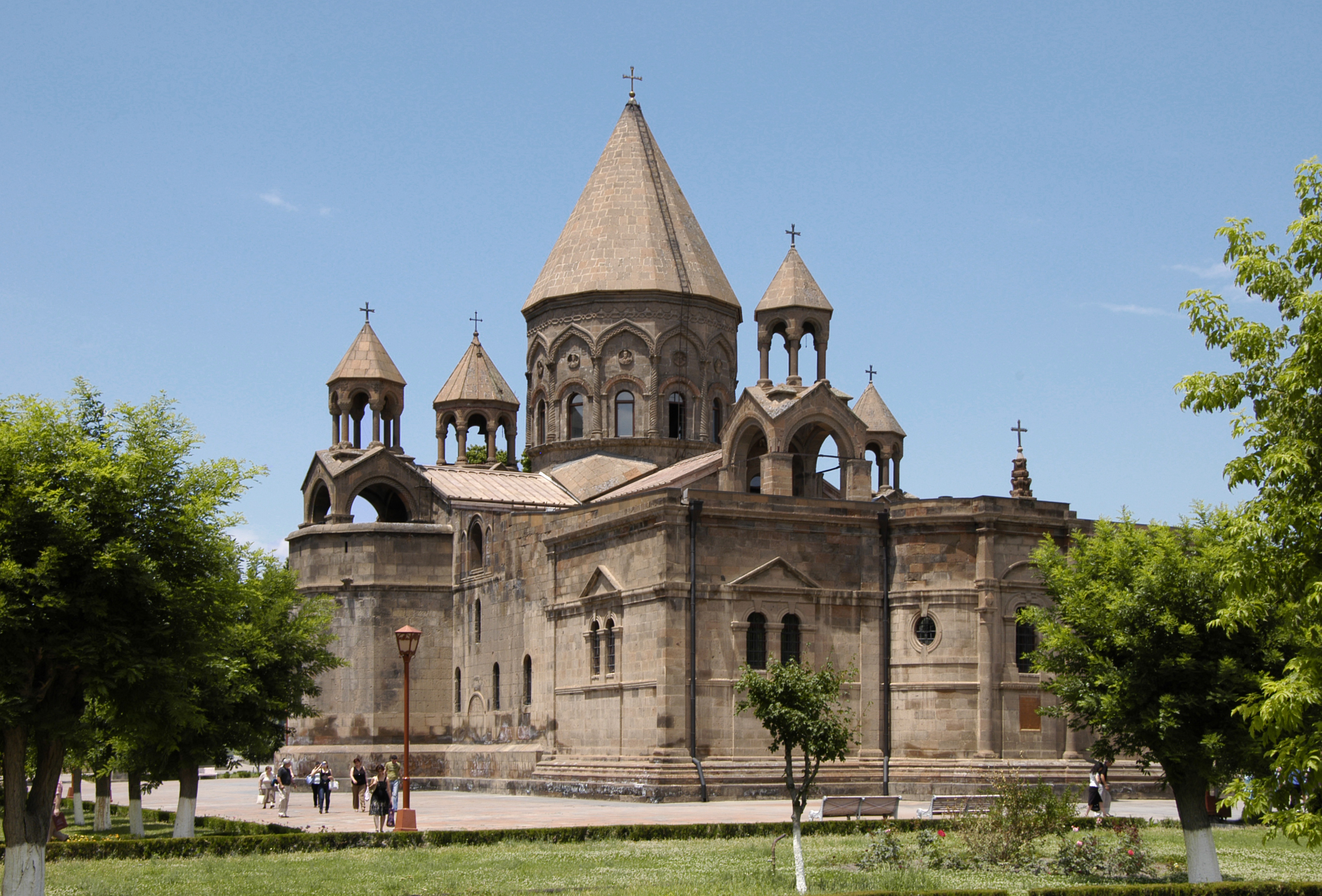
Etchmiadzin cathedral

- Etchmiadzin Cathedral is completed by Gregory the Illuminator and Tiridates III, king of Armenia.
- January 6 – Baptism of Tiridates III of Armenia.

====== America ======
- In Mexico, the civilization of Teotihuacan flourishes.

==== By topic ====
====== Religion ======
- March 4 – Adrian and Natalia of Nicomedia are martyred.

=== 304 ===
==== By place ====
====== Roman Empire ======
- Caesar Galerius, perhaps accompanied by Emperor Diocletian, wins his fourth and final victory over the Carpi. Many of the surviving Carpi and Bastarnae are resettled in the Roman Empire, where they are split up. The Bastarnae are not attested after this time, and the Carpi are attested only once more in the 310s.
- Diocletian, while inspecting the Danube border, becomes seriously ill.
- Caesar Constantius I besieges a Germanic raiding force on an island in the Rhine and forces their surrender.

====== Asia ======
- Sixteen Kingdoms: The Xiongnu establishes the Han-Zhao state under Liu Yuan, often seen as the start of the Upheaval of the Five Barbarians.
- Cheng-Han earns its independence from Jin dynasty.
- Biryu becomes king of the Korean kingdom of Baekje.

==== By topic ====
====== Religion ======
- October 25 – Pope Marcellinus dies at Rome after an 8-year reign. The papal throne will remain vacant until 308.

=== 305 ===
==== By place ====
====== Roman Empire ======
- May 1 – Emperor Diocletian abdicates and retires to his palace at Salona (modern Split) on the Adriatic coast, after a reign of nearly 21 years, in which the last vestiges of republican government have disappeared.
- Maximian retires from office, and leaves for Campania or Lucania (southern Italy), to live a life of ease in his luxury villas.
- Constantius I and Galerius are declared Augusti; Flavius Valerius Severus and Maximinus Daza are appointed Caesars.
- Constantius requests leave for his son Constantine I to join him in the west, who has been living at the courts of Diocletian and Galerius as a hostage. Galerius allows Constantine to return.
- Summer – Constantine joins his father at Bononia (Boulogne) in Gaul; they cross the Channel to Britain and make their way to Eboracum (York), capital of Britannia Secunda and home to a large military base. They campaign with success against the Picts.
- Galerius begins a series of campaigns against the Sarmatians, winning his first victory before the end of the year.
- Maximinus Daza persecutes the Christians of Egypt, many of whom take refuge in the desert. In time, this refuge leads to the monastic life. In these monasteries, Coptic writing develops, supporting the propagation of Christian texts.
- Patron of Pozzuoli, Saint Proculus, and patron of Naples, Saint Januarius are thrown to wild beasts in Pozzuoli's Flavian Amphitheater, then beheaded at Solfatara.
- In this or the following year, the Baths of Diocletian are dedicated; the thermae become the largest imperial baths in Rome.

====== Asia ======
- The Daysan River floods Edessa.

==== By topic ====
====== Commerce ======
- Landowners dominate the Roman Empire, and enjoy the title of senator, which exempts them from the crushing taxes imposed on the rest of the population. The Senate has lost all its power and the landowners almost never attend Senate sessions. Members of municipal senates (curiales or decuriones) are charged with the responsibility of collecting taxes and paying arrears; smaller landowners are held responsible for providing recruits for the Roman army, and with keeping wastelands under cultivation.

====== Religion ======
- Catherine makes a public confession of the Christian gospel at a sacrificial feast ordered by Maximinus Daza at Alexandria. A virgin of royal descent, she is tortured on a spiked wheel (later called the "Catherine Wheel") and beheaded; her remains are spirited to Mount Sinai.
- The Council of Illiberis decrees that priests must be celibate. Additionally, it condemns visiting the homes of Jews and prohibits Christian women from marrying Jews, unless they have converted.

=== 306 ===
==== By place ====
====== Roman Empire ======
- July 25 – Constantius I dies outside Eboracum (modern-day York). Constantine, aged 23 or 24, is declared emperor by his troops. Emperor Galerius grants Constantine the title of Caesar, and elevates Flavius Valerius Severus to emperor in the Western part of the Roman Empire.
- Constantine institutes toleration of the Christians in his territories.
- Constantine establishes his capital in Augusta Treverorum (Trier). He begins a major expansion of the city, strengthening the walls, expanding the palace complex and building the Imperial Baths.
- Building on the efforts of Diocletian, Galerius introduces the poll tax to central and southern Italy and truncates the size of the Praetorian Guard, with plans to disband the Guard altogether.
- October 28 – Maxentius, son of former Western Emperor Maximian, leads a revolt by the Praetorian Guard and members of the Senate in Rome, and is proclaimed Emperor. Southern Italy supports Maxentius, as do Africa, Corsica, Sardinia and Sicily. Maxentius recalls Maximian from retirement, who joins his son in Rome.
- Winter: Constantine fights with success against the Franks.
- Galerius has the Rotunda of Galerius built in Thessaloniki (Macedonia).

====== Asia ======
- The War of the Eight Princes ends in China.

==== By topic ====
====== Religion ======
- The Synod of Elvira concludes with the issue of various canons, including one declaring that killing through a magic spell is a sin and the work of the devil.
- Metrophanes becomes bishop of Byzantium.
- The Patriarchate of Lisbon is established.
- Christianity is established in Roman Britain. British bishops participate in the councils of Arles (314), Nicaea (325) and Arminum (349).

=== 307 ===
==== By place ====
====== Roman Empire ======
- Winter: Emperor Galerius wins his second victory over the Sarmatians.
- Galerius sends Valerius Severus with the army of northern Italy, to suppress the rebellion in Rome. However, faced with their former emperor Maximian, the soldiers desert him, and Severus flees to Ravenna. Maximian besieges Severus in Ravenna, who then surrenders. Maxentius makes Severus a hostage, in an attempt to keep Galerius at bay.
- Summer: Anticipating an offensive by Galerius, Maximian travels to Gaul to make an alliance with Constantine I.
- Late summer or autumn: Galerius invades Italy but Maxentius remains behind the walls of Rome. Galerius finds he cannot besiege the city, and the image of an emperor making efforts against Rome hurts Galerius' image among the troops. The fact that Maxentius is his son-in-law does not help, and Maxentius makes an effort to bribe Galerius' troops. Galerius unsuccessfully attempts to negotiate, and recognizing Maxentius' attempts at bribery and the danger of being trapped in Italy by Maximian and Constantine, Galerius chooses to withdraw from Italy. To satiate his troops during the withdrawal, he pillages the Italian countryside. Meanwhile, Maxentius executes Severus.
- December: Constantine marries Maximian's daughter Fausta, and is promoted to Augustus by Maximian.
- Near the end of the year, Galerius gives his wife (Diocletian's daughter) Galeria Valeria the title of Augusta.

====== China ======
- January 8 – Emperor Hui of Jin dies after a 16-year reign, in which eight dukes of the imperial family have conducted a civil war (War of the Eight Princes) against each other in a struggle for power. Huai of Jin, age 23, succeeds his father and becomes the third ruler of the Jin Dynasty.

=== 308 ===
==== By place ====
====== Roman Empire ======
- Winter: Emperor Galerius wins his third and final victory over the Sarmatians.
- April: In Rome, Emperor Maximian attempts to depose his son Maxentius, but the soldiers in Rome side with Maxentius and force Maximian to flee to the court of Constantine I.
- The overthrow of Maximian prompts the soldiers of Roman Africa to prop up the vicarius of Africa, Domitius Alexander, as a usurper.
- Constantine raids the territory of the Bructeri and builds a bridge across the Rhine at Cologne.
- November 11 – The Conference of Carnuntum: Attempting to keep peace within the Roman Empire, Galerius recalls Diocletian briefly from retirement, and they convene with Maximian. Diocletian persuades Maximian to return to retirement, and he and Galerius declare Maxentius a public enemy. Licinius is proclaimed Augustus of the west, while rival contender Constantine I is again declared Caesar.
- Bereft of his father's support, Maxentius increasingly presents himself as the Conservator Urbis Suae (Preserver of His Own City). Construction of the Basilica of Maxentius (or Basilica Nova), the largest building in the Roman Forum, is begun.
- Maxentius institutes toleration of the Christians in his territories.

====== Asia ======
- The Han-Zhao Dynasty is established in northern China, marking the official inception of the long lasting Uprising of the Five Barbarians.

==== By topic ====
====== Religion ======
- May 27 or June 26 – Pope Marcellus I succeeds Pope Marcellinus as the 30th pope.

=== 309 ===
==== By place ====
====== Roman Empire ======
- Gaius Ceionius Rufius Volusianus, the Praetorian Prefect of Emperor Maxentius, defeats the usurper Domitius Alexander and purges Africa of his supporters.

====== Persia ======
- King Hormizd II, ruler of the Sassanid Empire, demands that the king of the Ghassanids pays tribute. After the king refuses, Hormizd invades Ghassanid territory. The Ghassanids seek aid from Maximinus Daza, but before a Roman army can arrive, Hormizd defeats the Ghassanid army and kills their king. A Ghassanid force then ambushes Hormizd's small retinue while the latter is on a hunting trip, and the Sasanian king is mortally wounded. He dies after a 7-year reign.
- Hormizd is succeeded by his infant son Shapur II following the brief reign and murder of Adur Narseh.

==== By topic ====
====== Religion ======
- Pope Marcellus I is banished from Rome by Emperor Maxentius.
- April 18 – Eusebius succeeds Marcellus I as the 31st pope, but is himself banished on August 17 to Sicily (these events may have also taken place in 310).

== East Asia ==
In Yamato (Japan), the Kofun period dominated during this decade. It was an animistic culture which existed prior the introduction of Buddhism. A legend of the 4th century Prince Yamato Takeru alludes to the borders of the Yamato and battlegrounds in the area. A frontier was obviously somewhere close to the later Izumo province (the eastern part of today's Shimane Prefecture). Another frontier, in Kyūshū, was apparently somewhere north of today's Kumamoto prefecture. The legend specifically states that there was an eastern land in Honshū "whose people disobeyed the imperial court", against whom Yamato Takeru was sent to fight. That rivalling country may have been located rather close to the Yamato nucleus area itself, or relatively far away. The today Kai province is mentioned as one of the locations where prince Yamato Takeru sojourned in his said military expedition.

Northern frontier of this age was also explained in Kojiki as the legend of Shido Shōgun's (四道将軍: Shōguns to four ways) expedition. Out of four shōguns, Ōbiko set northward to Koshi and his son Take Nunakawawake set to eastern states. The father moved east from northern Koshi while the son moved north on his way, and they finally met at Aizu (current western Fukushima). Although the legend itself is not likely to be a historical fact, Aizu is rather close to southern Tōhoku, where the north end of keyhole kofun culture as of late 4th century is located.

== Births ==
300

- Aemilia Hilaria, Gallo-Roman physician (approximate date)
- Flavius Hermogenes, Roman prefect and politician (d. 361)
- Frumentius, Syrian missionary and bishop (approximate date)
- Hilary of Poitiers, Gallo-Roman bishop (approximate date)
- Li Shou, Chinese emperor of the Cheng Han Dynasty (d. 343)
- Macarius of Egypt, Coptic Christian monk and hermit (d. 391)
- Min of Jin, Chinese emperor of the Jin Dynasty (d. 318)
- Zeno of Verona, Christian bishop and martyr (approximate date)

301

- Xie Ai, Chinese general of the Former Liang state (d. 354)

302

- Sun Sheng (or Anguo), Chinese historian (d. 373)

303

- Magnentius, Roman usurper (d. 353)
- Wang Xizhi, Chinese calligrapher (d. 361)
- Xun Guan, Chinese warrior and general

305

- Yu Yi (or Zhigong), Chinese calligrapher and general (d. 345)

306

- Ephrem the Syrian, Syriac theologian and hymnodist (d. 373)

307

- Zhang Jun, Chinese prince of the Jin Dynasty (d. 346)

308

- Xie Shang (or Renzu), Chinese general (d. 357)

309

- Shapur II (the Great), king of the Sassanid Empire (d. 379)

== Deaths ==
300

- Jia Mi, Chinese general, official and politician
- Jia Nanfeng, Chinese empress of the Jin Dynasty (b. 257)
- Liu Ling, Chinese scholar and poet (b. 221)
- Lüzhu, Chinese dancer, singer and music teacher
- Pan Yue, Chinese poet and writer (b. 247)
- Pei Wei, Chinese philosopher and politician (b. 267)
- Shi Chong, Chinese politician and statesman (b. 249)
- Sima Yu, Chinese prince of the Jin Dynasty (b. 278)
- Sporus of Nicaea, Greek mathematician (approximate date)
- Zhang Hua, Chinese official, scholar and poet (b. 232)

301

- June 5 – Sima Lun, Chinese usurper (forced suicide)
- Sun Xiu (or Junzhong), Chinese official and politician

302

- Cao Huan, Chinese emperor of the Cao Wei state (b. 246)
- Narseh (or Narses), ruler of the Sassanid Empire
- Sima Jiong (or Jingzhi), Chinese prince and regent

303

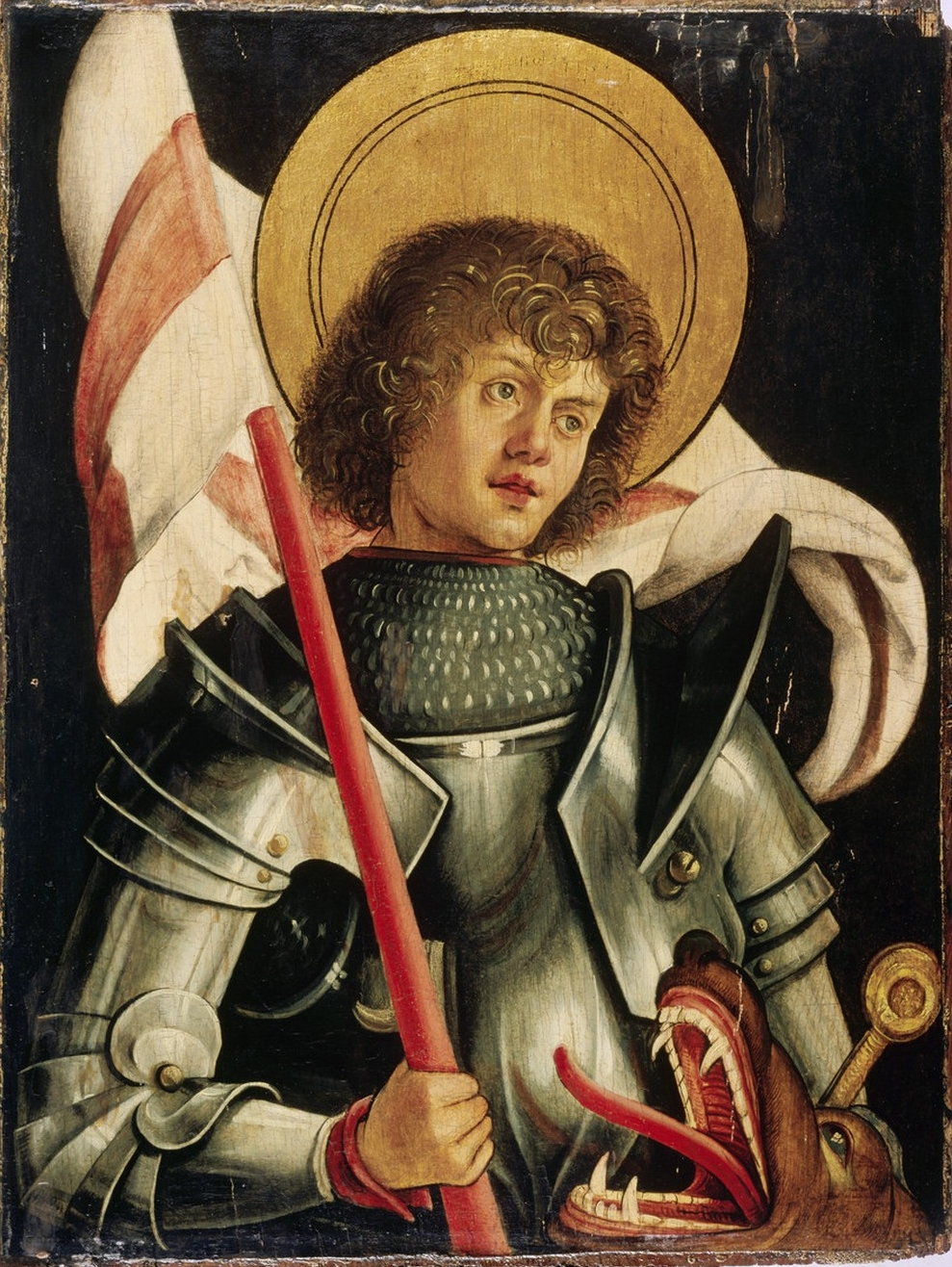
Saint George of Lydda

- April 23 – George of Lydda, Roman soldier and martyr
- Acacius of Byzantium, Roman centurion and martyr
- Anthimus of Rome, Christian priest and martyr
- Cao Huan, Chinese emperor of Cao Wei (b. 246)
- Cessianus, Christian child martyr
- Crescentinus, Roman soldier and martyr
- Cyriacus, Roman nobleman and martyr
- Devota, Corsican woman and martyr
- Erasmus of Formiae, Christian martyr
- Expeditus, Roman centurion and martyr
- Felix and Adauctus, Christian martyrs
- Fermin, Christian bishop and martyr
- Lu Ji, Chinese general and writer (b. 261)
- Li Liu, Chinese spiritual leader (b. 248)
- Li Te (or Xuanxiu), Chinese general
- Pantaleon, Christian wonderworker and martyr
- Romanus of Caesarea, Christian martyr
- Victor Maurus ("the Moor"), Christian martyr
- Vitus (or Guido), Christian martyr

304

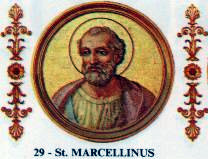
Pope Marcellinus

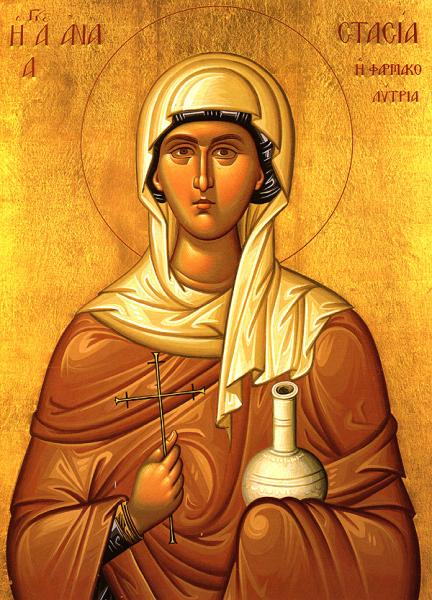
Anastasia

Note: Not all particulars of the Christian martyrs are supported by reliable historical evidence.

- January 21 – Saint Agnes of Rome (martyred by fire) (b. c. 291)
- March 19/20 – Sima Ai, Chinese prince of the Jin dynasty (executed) (b. 277)
- May 12 (or 303?) – Saint Pancras of Rome (martyred by beheading) (b. c. 289)
- c. October? – Bunseo of Baekje, king of Baekje (Korea) (assassinated)
- c. August 10 – Saint Philomena (martyred by beheading)
- October 25 – Pope Marcellinus
- December 25 – Saint Anastasia of Sirmium (martyred by beheading)
- Date unknown
  - Saint Afra (martyred by fire)
  - Saints Agape, Chionia, and Irene (martyred by fire and sword)
  - Saint Alban (martyred by beheading) (possibly 309)
  - Saint Florian (martyred by drowning)
  - Saint Gorgonius of Nicomedia (martyred)
  - Saint Juliana of Nicomedia (martyred)
  - Saint Lucy of Syracuse (martyred by fire and sword)
  - Saint Margaret the Virgin (martyred by beheading)
  - Saints Theodora and Didymus (martyred by beheading)
  - Saint Vincent of Saragossa (martyred)

305

- Januarius I of Benevento, Roman bishop and martyr
- Catherine of Alexandria, Christian martyr and virgin
- Porphyry of Tyre, Neoplatonist philosopher and writer
- Proculus of Pozzuoli (or Proclus), Christian martyr
- Sossianus Hierocles, Roman proconsul and aristocrat
- Tuoba Yituo, Chinese chieftain of the Tuoba clan
- Vincent, Orontius, and Victor, Christian martyrs
- Wang Rong (or Junchong), Chinese politician (b. 234)
- Zuo Si (or Taichong), Chinese poet and writer (b. 250)

306

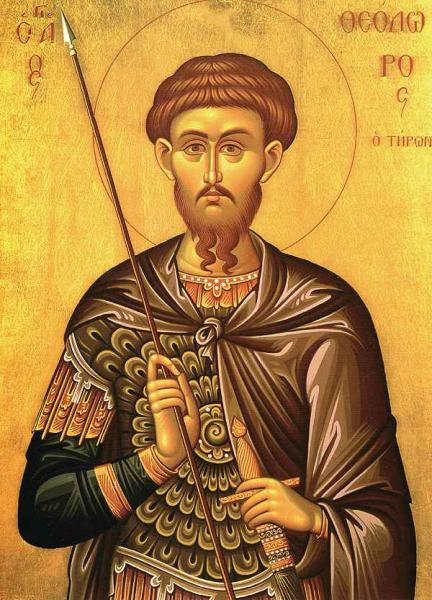
Saint Theodore of Amasea

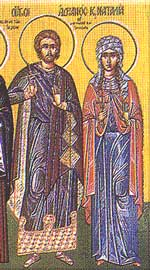
Saints Adrian and Natalia of Nicomedia

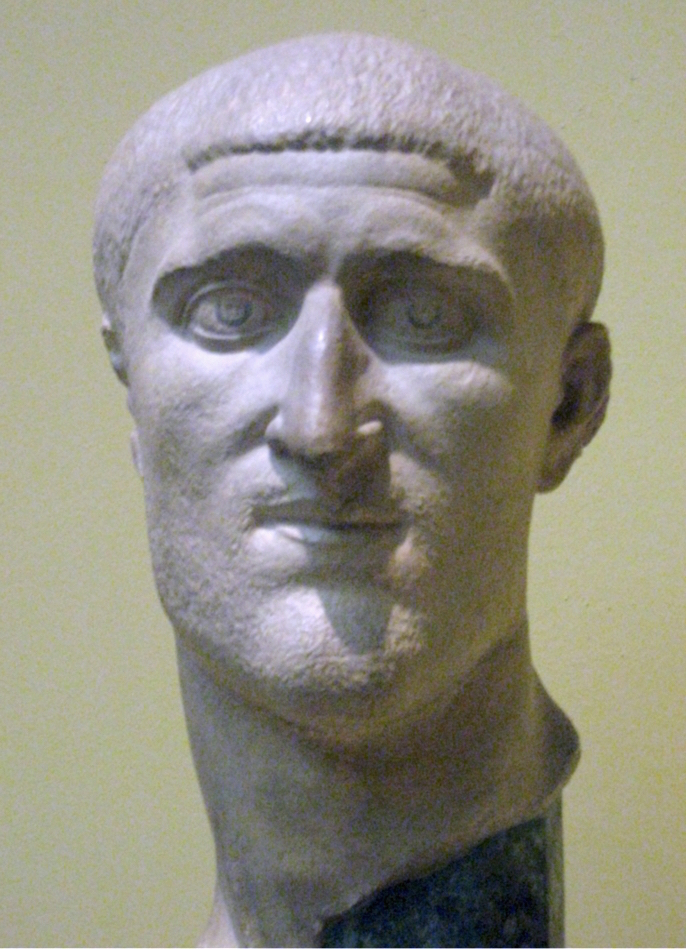
Constantius Chlorus

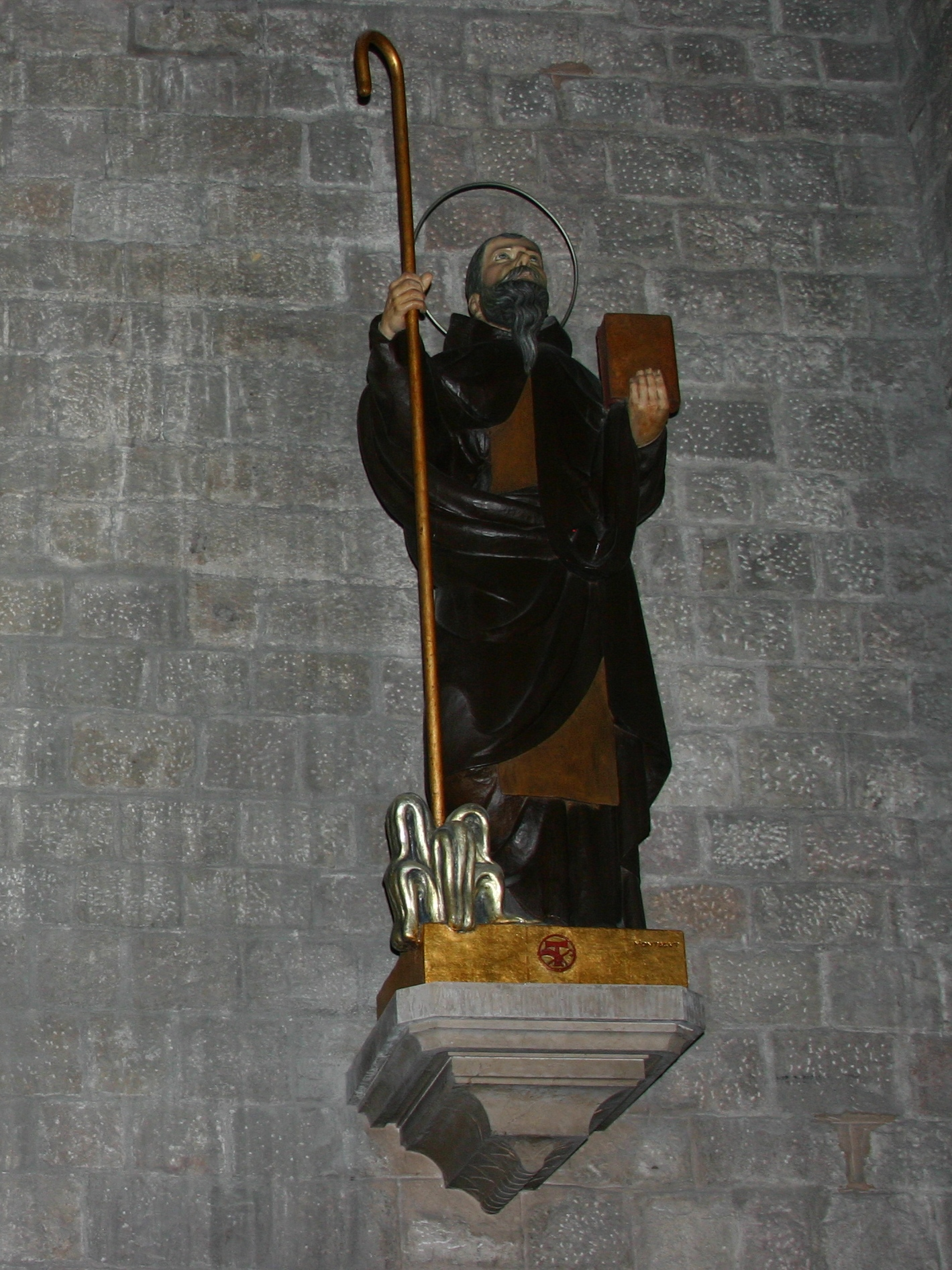
Saint Maginus

- February 17 – Theodore of Amasea, Roman soldier and martyr
- March 4 – Adrian and Natalia of Nicomedia, Christian martyrs
- July 25 – Constantius Chlorus, Roman emperor (b. c. 250)
- August 25 – Maginus, Christian hermit and martyr
- Demetrius of Thessaloniki, Roman soldier and martyr
- Sima Ying, Chinese prince of the Jin Dynasty (b. 279)
- Sima Yong (or Wenzai), Chinese prince and regent

307

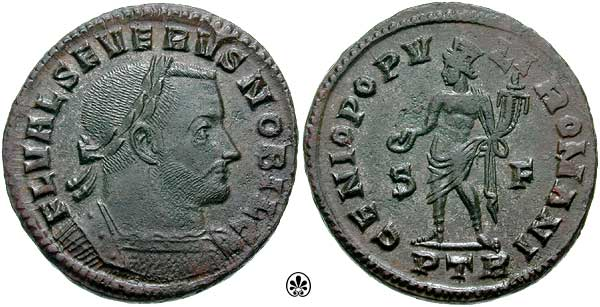
Severus II

- January 8 – Hui of Jin, Chinese emperor of the Jin Dynasty (b. 259)
- September 16 – Severus II, Roman emperor (murdered)
- Septimius of Iesi, German bishop, martyr and saint
- Tuoba Luguan, Chinese chieftain of the Tuoba clan

308

- Adrian of Batanea (or Eubulus), Christian martyr

309

- January 16 – Marcellus I, bishop of Rome (b. 255)
- Adur Narseh, king of the Sassanid Empire
- Elias and companions, Christian martyrs
- Hormizd II, king of the Sassanid Empire
