= 242 (disambiguation) =

242 may refer to:

- 242 (year)
- 242 (number)
- Fiat 242
- Front 242
- NGC 242
