= 242 =

242 in various calendars
- Gregorian calendar: 242; CCXLII
- Ab urbe condita: 995
- Assyrian calendar: 4992
- Balinese saka calendar: 163–164
- Bengali calendar: −352 – −351
- Berber calendar: 1192
- Buddhist calendar: 786
- Burmese calendar: −396
- Byzantine calendar: 5750–5751
- Chinese calendar: 辛酉年 (Metal Rooster); 2939 or 2732 — to — 壬戌年 (Water Dog); 2940 or 2733
- Coptic calendar: −42 – −41
- Discordian calendar: 1408
- Ethiopian calendar: 234–235
- Hebrew calendar: 4002–4003
- Hindu calendars
- Vikram Samvat: 298–299
- Shaka Samvat: 163–164
- Kali Yuga: 3342–3343
- Holocene calendar: 10242
- Iranian calendar: 380 BP – 379 BP
- Islamic calendar: 392 BH – 391 BH
- Javanese calendar: 120–121
- Julian calendar: 242; CCXLII
- Korean calendar: 2575
- Minguo calendar: 1670 before ROC 民前1670年
- Nanakshahi calendar: −1226
- Seleucid era: 553/554 AG
- Thai solar calendar: 784–785
- Tibetan calendar: ལྕགས་མོ་བྱ་ལོ་ (female Iron-Bird); 368 or −13 or −785 — to — ཆུ་ཕོ་ཁྱི་ལོ་ (male Water-Dog); 369 or −12 or −784

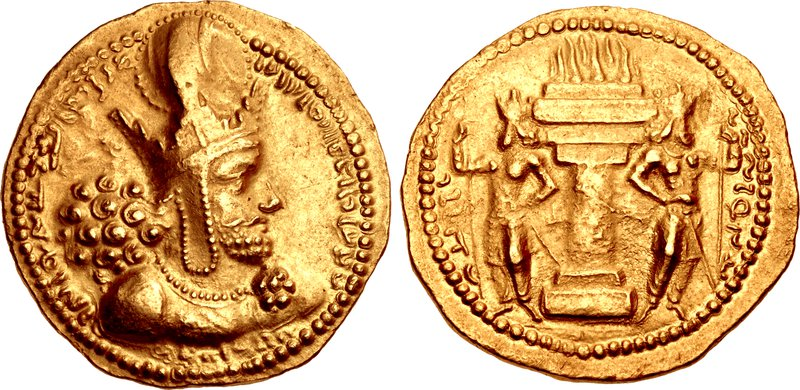
Gold dinar of Shapur I (r. 240–270)

Year 242 (CCXLII) was a common year starting on Saturday of the Julian calendar. At the time, it was known as the Year of the Consulship of Gratus and Lepidus (or, less frequently, year 995 Ab urbe condita). The denomination 242 for this year has been used since the early medieval period, when the Anno Domini calendar era became the prevalent method in Europe for naming years.

== Events ==
=== By place ===
==== Roman Empire ====
- Emperor Gordian III begins a campaign against King Shapur I, and leads victories at Antioch, Carrhae, Nisibis, and Resaina.
- Gordian III evacuates the Cimmerian cities in the Bosphorus (Crimea), as the territory is now controlled by the Goths.

==== Persia ====
- Shapur I makes a pre-emptive attack on Antioch to drive out the Romans. Gordian's father-in-law, Timesitheus, leads a Roman army to defeat the Sassanids at Carrhae and Nisibis.
- King Ardashir I, founder of the Sassanid Empire, dies after a 30-year reign. He is succeeded by his son and co-ruler Shapur I.

=== By topic ===
==== Religion ====
- Patriarch Titus succeeds Eugenius I as Patriarch of Constantinople (until 272).

== Births ==
- Saloninus, Roman emperor (d. 260)

== Deaths ==
- Ammonius Saccas, Egyptian philosopher (b. 175)
- Ardashir I, king of the Sassanid Empire (b. 180)
- Cao Hui, Chinese prince of the Cao Wei state
- Man Chong (or Boning), Chinese politician
