= Probus of Byzantium =

Bishop of Byzantium from 293 to 306

- Bishop of Byzantium
- Installed: 293
- Term ended: 306
- Predecessor: Rufinus of Byzantium
- Successor: Metrophanes of Byzantium

Personal details
- Died: 306
- Denomination: Early Christianity

Probus of Byzantium (Greek: Πρόβος; died 306) was bishop of Byzantium from 293 to 306. Probus was the son of Dometius of Byzantium, brother of Roman emperor Probus, who was the predecessor of his predecessor Rufinus of Byzantium. Probus was the brother of Metrophanes of Byzantium, who was his successor.

== Notes and references ==
Titles of the Great Christian Church
Preceded by Rufinus	Bishop of Byzantium; 293 – 306	Succeeded by Metrophanes
