= Metrophanes of Byzantium =

Bishop of Byzantium from 306 to 314

Saint Metrophanes of Byzantium
- Bishop of Byzantium
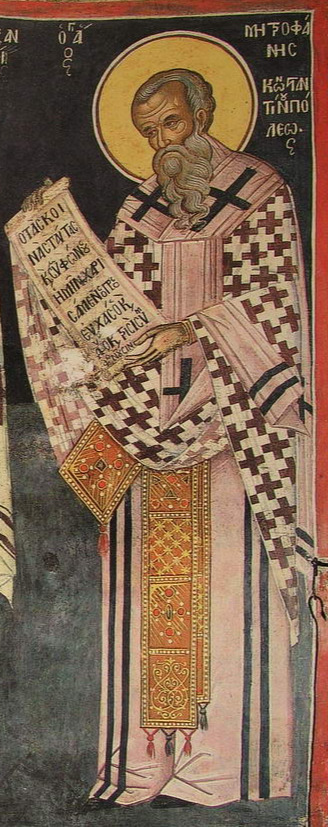
- Installed: 306
- Term ended: 314
- Predecessor: Probus of Byzantium
- Successor: Alexander of Constantinople

Personal details
- Died: 314
- Denomination: Early Christianity

Sainthood
- Feast day: 4 June
- Venerated in: Catholic Church; Eastern Orthodox Church

Metrophanes of Byzantium (Greek: Μητροφάνης; died 314) was bishop of Byzantium from c. 306 to 314. He was, according to tradition, the 26th bishop and is the first bishop mentioned by contemporary sources. In fact, there is no contemporary mention of an organized Christian community in Byzantium before him.

There is a tradition that the Roman emperor Constantine the Great bestowed upon him the honorary title of Patriarch; however, Byzantium did not become the capital of the Empire until 330 (when it was renamed Constantinople), and the see was not elevated to a patriarchate until 451. According to Gelasius of Cyzicus, Metrophanes was alive during the First Council of Nicaea (325), but could not partake due to his age and ill health, so he sent instead Alexander of Constantinople, whom he destined as his successor. Metrophanes was most likely already dead by then. Socrates of Constantinople writes that Alexander of Constantinople succeeded Metrophanes sometime before 319.

Metrophanes has been canonised saint and is revered in both the Eastern Orthodox Church and the Catholic Church. His feast day is 4 June.

His father was Dometius of Byzantium, his uncle was Roman emperor Probus, and his brother Probus of Byzantium. Both were also appointed Bishops of Byzantium before him.

== See also ==
- Metrophanes of Smyrna

Religious titles
Preceded by Probus	Bishop of Byzantium; 306 – 314	Succeeded by Alexander
