= Eugenius I of Byzantium =

Bishop of Byzantium from 240 to 265

- Bishop of Byzantium
- Installed: c. 240
- Term ended: c. 265
- Predecessor: Castinus of Byzantium
- Successor: Titus of Byzantium

Personal details
- Died: c. 265
- Denomination: Early Christianity

Eugenius I of Byzantium (Greek: Ευγένιος Αʹ; died c. 265) was the bishop of Byzantium from around 240 until his death in c. 265.

== Notes and references ==
Titles of the Great Christian Church
Preceded by Castinus	Bishop of Byzantium; 240 – 265	Succeeded by Titus
