= Fausta Garavini =

Italian writer and translator (born 1938)

Fausta Garavini (born 1938, Bologna, Italy) is an Italian writer and translator.

She studied French and Occitan literature at the University of Florence She later worked as a literature professor at this university and as an essayist in several publications like "Paragone", "Nuovi Argomenti", "Revue d'histoire littéraire de la France" and "Littérature".

== Prizes ==
- Premio Mondello, 1979 with Gli occhi dei pavoni
- Premio Vittorini, 2011
- Finalist: Premio Viareggio, Premio Bagutta

== Works ==
=== Essay ===
- L'empèri dóu soulèu: La ragione dialettale nella Francia d'oc (Ricciardi, 1967)
- La letteratura occitanica moderna (Sansoni, 1970)
- I sette colori del romanzo. Saggio sulla narrativa di Robert Brasillach (Bulzoni, 1973)
- Il paese delle finzioni. Saggi sulla narrativa francese fra Sei e Settecento (Pacini, 1978)
- La casa dei giochi: idee e forme nel Seicento francese (Einaudi, 1980)
- Itinerari a Montaigne (Sansoni, 1983)
- Parigi e provincia: scene della letteratura francese (Bollati Boringhieri, 1990)
- Mostri e chimere. Montaigne, il testo e il fantasma (Il Mulino, 1991)
- Controfigure d'autore: scritture autobiografiche nella letteratura francese (Il Mulino, 1993)
- Carrefour Montaigne (ETS/Slatkine, 1994)

=== Novels ===
- Gli occhi dei pavoni (Vallecchi, 1979)
- Diletta Costanza (Marsilio, 1996)
- Uffizio delle tenebre (Marsilio, 1998)
- In nome dell'imperatore (Cierre, 2008)
- Diario delle solitudini (Bompiani, 2011)
- Storie di donne (Bompiani, 2012)
