= 352 =

352 in various calendars
Gregorian calendar	352; CCCLII
Ab urbe condita	1105
Assyrian calendar	5102
Balinese saka calendar	273–274
Bengali calendar	−242 – −241
Berber calendar	1302
Buddhist calendar	896
Burmese calendar	−286
Byzantine calendar	5860–5861
Chinese calendar	辛亥年 (Metal Pig); 3049 or 2842 — to — 壬子年 (Water Rat); 3050 or 2843
Coptic calendar	68–69
Discordian calendar	1518
Ethiopian calendar	344–345
Hebrew calendar	4112–4113
- Hindu calendars
Vikram Samvat	408–409
Shaka Samvat	273–274
Kali Yuga	3452–3453
Holocene calendar	10352
Iranian calendar	270 BP – 269 BP
Islamic calendar	278 BH – 277 BH
Javanese calendar	234–235
Julian calendar	352; CCCLII
Korean calendar	2685
Minguo calendar	1560 before ROC 民前1560年
Nanakshahi calendar	−1116
Seleucid era	663/664 AG
Thai solar calendar	894–895
Tibetan calendar	阴金猪年 (female Iron-Pig); 478 or 97 or −675 — to — 阳水鼠年 (male Water-Rat); 479 or 98 or −674

Year 352 (CCCLII) was a leap year starting on Wednesday of the Julian calendar. At the time, it was known as the Year of the Consulship of Decentius and Paulus (or, less frequently, year 1105 Ab urbe condita). The denomination 352 for this year has been used since the early medieval period, when the Anno Domini calendar era became the prevalent method in Europe for naming years.

== Events ==
=== By place ===
==== Roman Empire ====
- Emperor Constantius II invades northern Italy in pursuit of the usurper Magnus Magnentius, who withdraws with his army to Gaul. He declares an amnesty for Magnentius' soldiers, many of whom desert to him.
- By the end of the year Constantius enters Milan.
- The Alamanni and the Franks cross the Rhine and defeat the depleted Roman units left at the frontier. The Germans take control of around 40 towns and cities between the Moselle and the Rhine.
- Constantius Gallus sends his general (magister equitum) Ursicinus to forcefully put down the Jewish revolt in Palestine. The rebels destroy the cities Diopolis and Tiberias, while Diocesarea is razed to the ground. Ursicinus gives the order to kill thousands of Jews, even children. After the revolt, a permanent garrison is stationed in Galilee.

==== Asia ====
- War begins between the Huns and the Alans.
- Ran Wei is destroyed after Ran Min is killed by Murong Jun, the Xianbei emperor of the Former Yan.

=== By topic ===
==== Art and Science ====
- The earliest sighting of a supernova occurs in China.

==== Religion ====
- May 17 – Pope Julius I dies after a 15-year reign in which he has made himself the chief opponent of Arianism. He is succeeded by Pope Liberius as the 36th pope, who immediately writes to Constantius II requesting a council at Aquileia to discuss the former Alexandrian patriarch Athanasius, who opposes the Arian belief to which the emperor subscribes.

== Births ==
- Arsenius the Great, anchorite and Desert Father (approximate date)

== Deaths ==
- April 12 – Julius I, bishop of Rome
- June 1 – Ran Min, Chinese emperor "Heavenly King" (Tian Wang)
- Yao Yizhong, Chinese general and warlord (b. 280)
