= NGC 241 =

Open cluster in the constellation Tucana

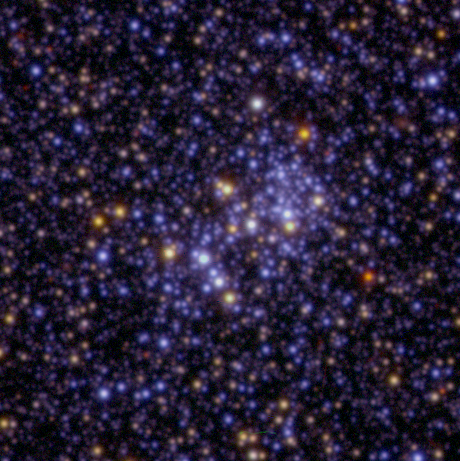
- NGC 241 with DECam

Observation data (J2000 epoch)
- Right ascension: 00^{h} 43^{m} 31.5^{s}
- Declination: −73° 26′ 26″
- Distance: 195000 ly (60000 pc)
- Apparent dimensions (V): 0.95′ × 0.95′

Physical characteristics
- Mass: 3.7×10^{3} M_{☉}
- Estimated age: 69 Myr

Associations
- Constellation: Tucana

NGC 241 is an open cluster located in the constellation Tucana. It is located within the Small Magellanic Cloud. It was discovered on April 11, 1834, by John Herschel.
