= 250 =

250 in various calendars
- Gregorian calendar: 250; CCL
- Ab urbe condita: 1003
- Assyrian calendar: 5000
- Balinese saka calendar: 171–172
- Bengali calendar: −344 – −343
- Berber calendar: 1200
- Buddhist calendar: 794
- Burmese calendar: −388
- Byzantine calendar: 5758–5759
- Chinese calendar: 己巳年 (Earth Snake); 2947 or 2740 — to — 庚午年 (Metal Horse); 2948 or 2741
- Coptic calendar: −34 – −33
- Discordian calendar: 1416
- Ethiopian calendar: 242–243
- Hebrew calendar: 4010–4011
- Hindu calendars
- Vikram Samvat: 306–307
- Shaka Samvat: 171–172
- Kali Yuga: 3350–3351
- Holocene calendar: 10250
- Iranian calendar: 372 BP – 371 BP
- Islamic calendar: 383 BH – 382 BH
- Javanese calendar: 128–129
- Julian calendar: 250; CCL
- Korean calendar: 2583
- Minguo calendar: 1662 before ROC 民前1662年
- Nanakshahi calendar: −1218
- Seleucid era: 561/562 AG
- Thai solar calendar: 792–793
- Tibetan calendar: ས་མོ་སྦྲུལ་ལོ་ (female Earth-Snake); 376 or −5 or −777 — to — ལྕགས་ཕོ་རྟ་ལོ་ (male Iron-Horse); 377 or −4 or −776

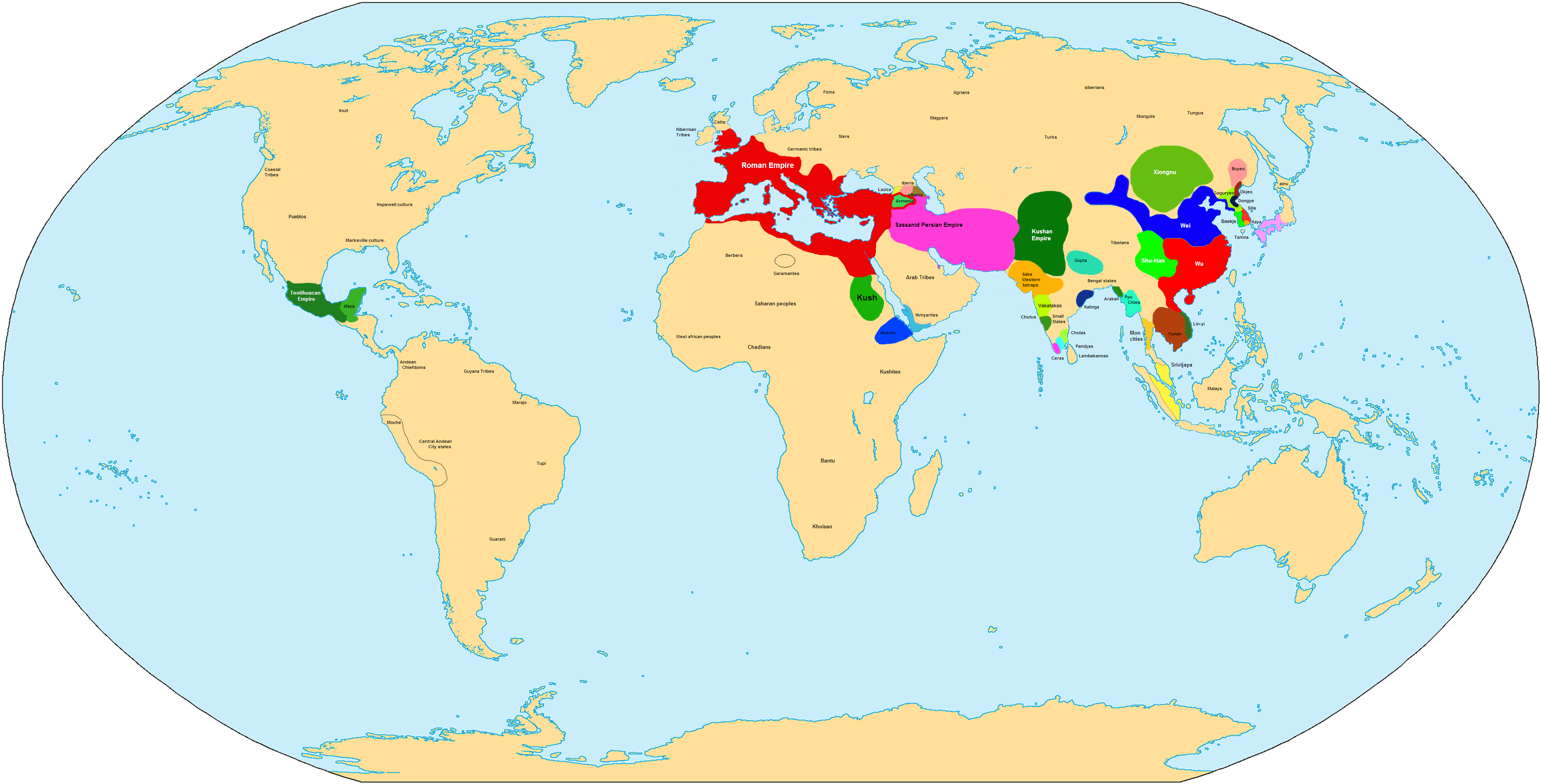
The world in 250

Year 250 (CCL) was a common year starting on Tuesday of the Julian calendar. At the time, it was known as the Year of the Consulship of Traianus and Gratus (or, less frequently, year 1003 Ab urbe condita). The denomination 250 for this year has been used since the early medieval period, when the Anno Domini calendar era became the prevalent method in Europe for naming years.

== Events ==
=== By place ===
==== Roman Empire ====
- A group of Franks penetrate as far as Tarragona in Spain (approximate date).
- The Goths under King Cniva invade Moesia. They cross the Danube and lay siege to Novae and Marcianopolis.
- Battle of Augusta Traiana: The Romans lose the battle against the Goths.
- Cniva lays siege to Philippopolis (modern Plovdiv). After a long resistance, Cniva conquers the city and slays its one hundred thousand inhabitants.
- The Alamanni drive the Romans from the modern area of Donau-Ries.
- An epidemic begins in Ethiopia, moves into Egypt and the Roman colonies in North Africa, and spreads through the Roman Empire (named the Plague of Cyprian, after St. Cyprian, bishop of Carthage).

==== Africa ====
- The Kingdom of Aksum (Axum) takes control of commerce on the Red Sea.

==== Asia ====
- The earliest Chinese references to a device known as "emperor's south-pointing carriage" date to this period.

==== Mesoamerica ====
- Teotihuacán is rebuilt as a four-quartered cosmogram by Zapotec architects brought from Monte Albán in Oaxaca.
- Classic period of Mesoamerican civilization begins.

=== By topic ===
==== Art and science ====
- Diophantus writes Arithmetica, the first systematic treatise on algebra.
- Approximate date
  - The family portrait medallion, traditionally called the Family of Vunnerius Keramus, is made (it is later placed in the Brescia Cross, and then in the Museo Civico dell'Etá Cristiana, Brescia).
  - The Ludovisi Battle sarcophagus, depicting battle between the Romans and the Barbarians, is made for use in Rome (it is later moved to the collection of the National Roman Museum).
  - The Igel Column is erected at Trier in Germany.

==== Religion ====
- January 3 – Decian persecution of Christians is initiated when Emperor Decius orders everyone in the Roman Empire (except Jews) to perform a sacrifice to the gods of religion in ancient Rome. On January 20, Pope Fabian becomes one of the first martyrs of this persecution.
- Possible date – Denis, a bishop of Paris, is martyred by beheading.

== Births ==
- March 31 – Constantius Chlorus, Roman emperor (d. 306)
- Gaius Galerius Valerius Maximianus, Roman emperor (d. 311)
- Lu Jing (or Shiren), Chinese general and writer (d. 280)
- Maximian (Herculius), Roman consul and emperor (d. 310)
- Zuo Si (or Taichong), Chinese poet and writer (d. 305)

== Deaths ==
- January 20 – Fabian (or Fabianus), pope of Rome and martyr
- Du Qiong (or Boyu), Chinese official and astronomer
- Faustus, Abibus and Dionysius, Christian martyrs
- Marcus Minucius Felix, Roman apologist and writer
- Peter, Andrew, Paul and Denise, Christian martyrs
- Secundian, Marcellian and Verian, Christian martyrs
- Tryphon, Respicius, and Nympha, Christian martyrs
- Zhu Ju, Chinese general and chancellor (b. 194)
