= 319 =

319 in various calendars
- Gregorian calendar: 319; CCCXIX
- Ab urbe condita: 1072
- Assyrian calendar: 5069
- Balinese saka calendar: 240–241
- Bengali calendar: −275 – −274
- Berber calendar: 1269
- Buddhist calendar: 863
- Burmese calendar: −319
- Byzantine calendar: 5827–5828
- Chinese calendar: 戊寅年 (Earth Tiger); 3016 or 2809 — to — 己卯年 (Earth Rabbit); 3017 or 2810
- Coptic calendar: 35–36
- Discordian calendar: 1485
- Ethiopian calendar: 311–312
- Hebrew calendar: 4079–4080
- Hindu calendars
- Vikram Samvat: 375–376
- Shaka Samvat: 240–241
- Kali Yuga: 3419–3420
- Holocene calendar: 10319
- Iranian calendar: 303 BP – 302 BP
- Islamic calendar: 312 BH – 311 BH
- Javanese calendar: 200–201
- Julian calendar: 319; CCCXIX
- Korean calendar: 2652
- Minguo calendar: 1593 before ROC 民前1593年
- Nanakshahi calendar: −1149
- Seleucid era: 630/631 AG
- Thai solar calendar: 861–862
- Tibetan calendar: ས་ཕོ་སྟག་ལོ་ (male Earth-Tiger); 445 or 64 or −708 — to — ས་མོ་ཡོས་ལོ་ (female Earth-Hare); 446 or 65 or −707

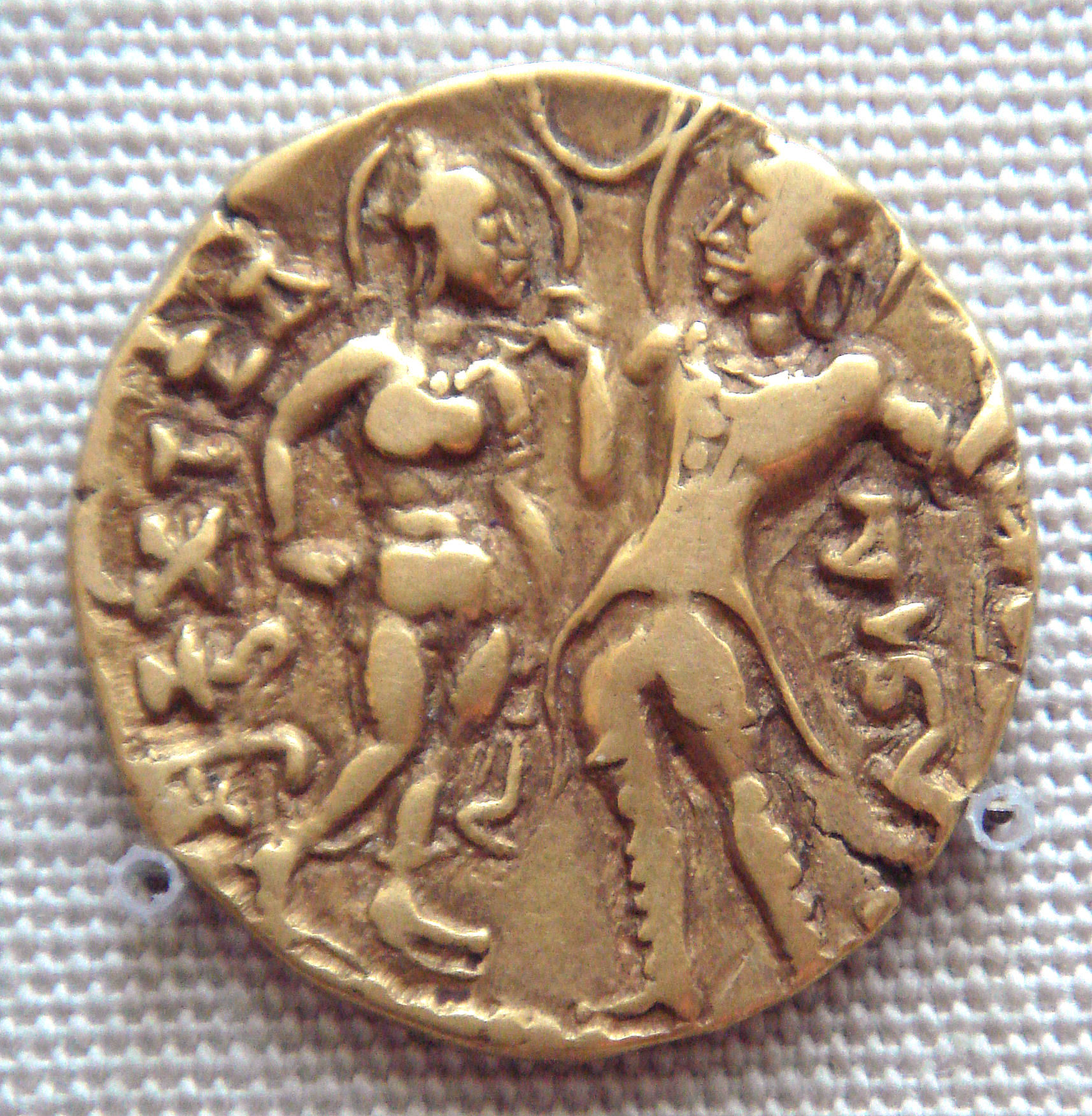
King Chandragupta I and his wife Queen Kumaradevi (Gupta Empire)

Year 319 (CCCXIX) was a common year starting on Thursday of the Julian calendar. At the time, it was known as the Year of the Consulship of Constantinus and Licinius (or, less frequently, year 1072 Ab urbe condita). The denomination 319 for this year has been used since the early medieval period, when the Anno Domini calendar era became the prevalent method in Europe for naming years.

== Events ==
=== By place ===
==== Roman Empire ====
- Emperor Constantine the Great prohibits the separation of the families of slaves, during a change in ownership.

==== Georgia ====
- Christianity is introduced in Colchis, present-day Georgia.

=== By topic ===
==== Religion ====
- Arius travels to Nicomedia at the invitation of Bishop Eusebius, after having been accused of heresy and condemned by Alexander, the Patriarch of Alexandria. This gives rise to the Arian Controversy.

== Births ==
- Murong Jun, Chinese emperor of the Former Yan (d. 360)

== Deaths ==
- Du Zeng, Chinese general and rebel leader
- Ghatotkacha, Indian ruler of the Gupta Empire
- Theodore Stratelates, Greek general and martyr (b. 281)
