= Fausta =

Fausta is a feminine given name. Notable people with the given name include:

- Fausta Cornelia, daughter of Sulla, Roman Dictator
- Flavia Maxima Fausta (289–326), wife of Constantine the Great, Roman emperor
  - Fausta (opera), opera by Gaetano Donizetti, about Flavia Maxima Fausta
- Fausta (wife of Constans II) (c. 630–after 668), Byzantine empress
- Fausta of Cyzicus (c. 298–311), Christian martyr and saint
- Fausta of Sirmium, mother of Saint Anastasia of Sirmium, and saint
- Fausta Bergamotto (born 1968), Italian politician
- Fausta Cialente (1898–1994), Italian novelist, journalist and political activist
- Fausta Garavini (born 1938), Italian writer and translator
- Fausta Morganti (1944–2021), Sammarinese politician
- Fausta Quintavalla (born 1959), Italian javelin thrower
- Fausta Šostakaitė (born 2004), Lithuanian rhythmic gymnast
- Hermana Fausta (1858–1942), Filipino laywoman
