= Faustus, Abibus and Dionysius of Alexandria =

Christian martyrs put to death in 250

Saints Faustus, Abibus and Dionysius

Martyrs
- Born: Roman Egypt
- Died: 250; Roman Egypt
- Venerated in: Coptic Orthodox Church, Catholic Church

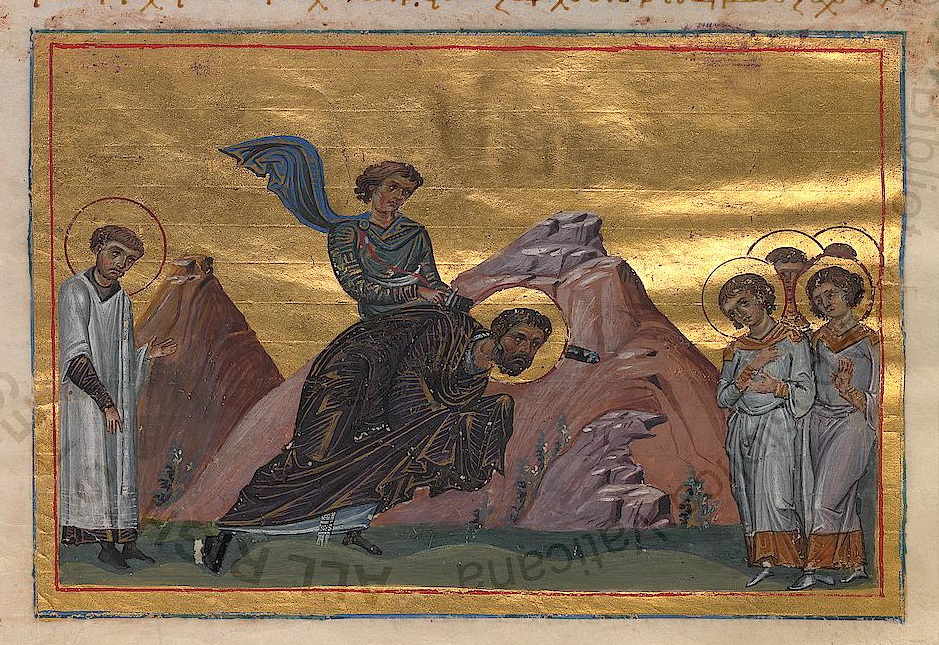

Faustus, Abibus and Dionysius of Alexandria (died 250) were Christian martyrs put to death under Decius in 250.

Faustus was a priest, Abibus was a deacon, and Dionysius was a lector. They were executed with several others, who include:

- Andronicus, a soldier
- Andropelagia,
- Cyriacus, an acolyte
- another Cyriacus,
- Theocistus, a sea captain
- Macarius,
- Andreas,
- Sarpambo,
- Thecla, and
- Caldote.

The Roman Martyrology lists only Faustus and Macarius with 10 companions.

Their feast day is celebrated on 6 September.

== Sources ==
- Holweck, F. G. A Biographical Dictionary of the Saints. St. Louis, MO: B. Herder Book Co. 1924.
