= Titus of Byzantium =

Bishop of Byzantium from 242 to 272

- Bishop of Byzantium
- Installed: 242
- Term ended: 272
- Predecessor: Eugenius I of Byzantium
- Successor: Dometius of Byzantium

Personal details
- Born: c. 3rd century
- Died: 272
- Denomination: Early Christianity

Titus of Byzantium (Greek: Τῖτος; died 272) was Bishop of Byzantium from 242 to 272.

He is venerated in the Eastern Orthodox Church on the 4 June.

== Notes and references ==
Titles of the Great Christian Church
Preceded by Eugenius I	Bishop of Byzantium; 242 – 272	Succeeded by Dometius
