= Dometius of Byzantium =

Bishop of Byzantium from 272 to 284

- Bishop of Byzantium
- Installed: 272
- Term ended: 284
- Predecessor: Titus of Byzantium
- Successor: Rufinus of Byzantium

Personal details
- Died: 284
- Denomination: Early Christianity

Dometius of Byzantium (Greek: Δομέτιος; died 284) was bishop of Byzantium from about 272 to about 284.

He was a brother of the Roman emperor Probus. He converted to Early Christianity, and fled Rome to Byzantium with his two sons, Probus and Metrophanes to escape persecution.

He was baptised by bishop Titus of Byzantium, whom he succeeded. and entered the clergy. After the death of Titus in 272 he became bishop.

His sons later became bishops of the same city: Probus (served 293–306) and Metrophanes (served 306–314).

== Bibliography ==
- Οικουμενικό Πατριαρχείο. (English:Ecumenical Patriarchate)

Titles of the Great Christian Church
| Preceded by Titus | Bishop of Byzantium; 272 – 284 | Succeeded by Rufinus |
