= Rufinus of Byzantium =

Bishop of Byzantium from 284 to 293

- Bishop of Byzantium
- Installed: 284
- Term ended: 293
- Predecessor: Dometius of Byzantium
- Successor: Probus of Byzantium

Personal details
- Died: 293
- Denomination: Early Christianity

Rufinus of Byzantium (Greek: Ρουφῖνος; died 293) was bishop of Byzantium from 284 to 293.

== Notes and references ==
Titles of the Great Christian Church
Preceded by Dometius	Bishop of Byzantium; 284 – 293	Succeeded by Probus
