= Cen Hun =

Eastern Wu official (died 280)

- 岑昏

among the Nine Ministers
- In office ? – 280
- Monarch: Sun Hao

Personal details
- Born: Unknown Wu Commandery
- Died: between 17 April and 1 May 280 (Note: Sun Hao's biography in the Sanguozhi recorded that Cen Hun died on the bingyin day of the 3rd month of the 4th year of the Tianji era of Sun Hao's reign. This is probably an error because there was no bingyin day in that month. The closest bingyin days and their corresponding dates in the Gregorian calendar were 26 March 280 (bingyin day of the 2nd month) and 25 May 280 (bingyin day of the 4th month). The Zizhi Tongjian recorded that Cen was executed in the 3rd month of that year, while Sun Hao surrendered on the renyin day of that month; the month starts from 17 Apr 280 in the Julian calendar, while the renyin day corresponds to 1 May 280.)
- Occupation: Official

Cen Hun (died between 17 April and 1 May 280) was an official of the state of Eastern Wu during the late Three Kingdoms period (220–280) of China.

== Life ==
Cen Hun was the descendant of Cen Peng (岑彭), one of the 28 generals of the Cloud Terrace who served Emperor Guangwu of Han. His great-grandfather Cen Zhi (岑晊), was a notable figure in the late Eastern Han who was involved in the Disasters of the Partisan Prohibitions (Note: Cen Zhi has a biography in vol.67 of Book of the Later Han; the volume contained biographies of those who were branded as "partisans" during the Disasters.). His father Cen Ke (岑軻), was an Administrator of Poyang.

He held positions among the Nine Ministers during the reign of Sun Hao, the fourth and last emperor of Wu. Historians described him as a corrupt official who oppressed the people. However, on one occasion, he led other officials to beg Sun Hao to spare the life of Zhang Shang (張尚; grandson of Zhang Hong), an official holding the position of Prefect of the Palace Writers (中書令), after Zhang Shang offended the emperor.

In c.late April 280, the Jin dynasty's invasion of Wu was nearing its end. Before Sun Hao surrendered to the Jin dynasty on 1 May, several Wu officials blamed Cen Hun for causing the downfall of Wu and urged Sun Hao to execute him. Sun Hao reluctantly agreed, and even though he regretted his decision later and tried to rescind his order, it was too late as Cen Hun had already been executed. (Note: Both Sun Hao's biography in Sanguozhi and the Zizhi Tongjian recorded that Cen was executed before Sun Hao's surrender.)

== In Romance of the Three Kingdoms ==
In the 14th-century historical novel Romance of the Three Kingdoms, which romanticises the events before and during the Three Kingdoms period, Cen Hun is portrayed as a palace eunuch and close aide of Sun Hao. He instigates the emperor's tyranny and plays a significant role in bringing about the corruption and decadence that led to the downfall of Wu in 280. After Sun Hao surrenders to the Jin dynasty, many former Wu officials blame him for causing Wu's downfall and had him executed by slow slicing.

== See also ==
- Lists of people of the Three Kingdoms
