= Bonosus (usurper) =

Usurper of the Roman Empire (died 280)

- Usurper of the Roman Empire
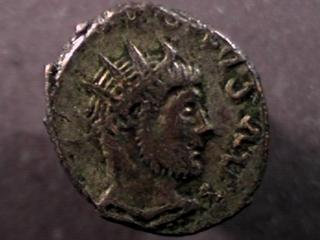
- Antoninianus previously identified as Bonosus, now assumed to be a barbarous imitation of a Postumus antoninianus.
- Reign: c. AD 280 (against Probus)
- Died: 280 AD
- Wife: Unknown
- Issue: Two sons
Names
- Bonosus
Regnal name
- Imperator Caesar Bonosus Augustus
- Father: A Briton
- Mother: A Gaul

Bonosus (died AD 280) was a late 3rd-century Roman usurper. He was born in Hispania (Roman Spain) to a British father and Gallic mother. His father—a rhetorician and "teacher of letters"—died when Bonosus was still young but the boy's mother gave him a decent education. He had a distinguished military career with an excellent service record. He rose successively through the ranks and tribuneships but, while he was stationed in charge of the Rhenish fleet c. 280, the Germans managed to set it on fire. Fearful of the consequences, he proclaimed himself Roman emperor at Colonia Agrippina (Cologne) jointly with Proculus. After a protracted struggle, he was defeated by Marcus Aurelius Probus and hanged himself rather than face capture.

Bonosus left behind a wife and two sons who were treated with honor by Probus.
