= Proculus =

Usurper of the Roman Empire (died c. 281)

- Usurper of the Roman Empire
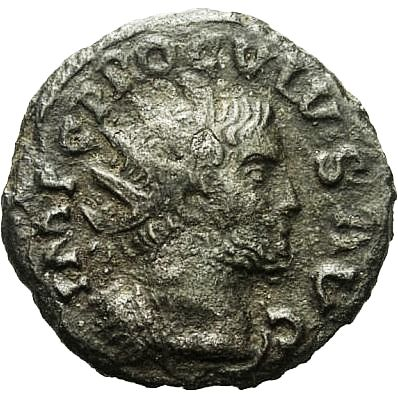
- Antoninianus of Proculus
- Reign: 280, against Probus
- Born: Albingaunum, Italia (modern-day Albenga, Italy)
- Died: c. 281
Names
- Proculus
Regnal name
- Imperator Caesar Proculus Augustus

Proculus (died c. 281) was a Roman usurper, one of the "minor pretenders" according to Historia Augusta, who would have taken the purple against Emperor Probus in 280. This is now disputed.

Probably Proculus had family connection with the Franks, to whom he turned in vain when his bid for imperial power was failing. He was a native of Albingaunum (modern Albenga in Liguria in north-west Italy). Though he was accounted a noble, his ancestors had been brigands and were the source of his vast wealth. Proculus was able to arm 2000 slaves of his own latifundia after seizing imperial office in the West. He was married to a woman named Vituriga, who was given the nickname "Samso" for her capabilities (considered "unwomanly" by the fourth century author of Historia Augusta), and at the time of his usurpation, he had one son, Herennianus, aged four.

Proculus was an ambitious soldier, who had commanded more than one legion as tribune; when in 280 he was asked by the people of Lugdunum (Lyon) who had started a rebellion against Emperor Probus to take the purple, he accepted, proclaiming himself joint emperor with Bonosus. "He was, nevertheless, of some benefit to the Gauls, for he crushed the Alamanni — who then were still called Germans — and not without illustrious glory, though he never fought save in brigand-fashion" (Historia Augusta)

On his return from fighting the Sassanids in Syria, Probus forced Proculus to retreat north. After failing to find support among the Franks, he was betrayed by them and handed over to Probus. Probus had Proculus killed (ca. 281), but spared his family " with his accustomed moderation, and spared the fortunes as well as the lives of their innocent families," (Gibbon, I.12) who remained at Albingaunum, declaring, according to Historia Augusta, that they wished neither to be princes nor brigands.

There exists a letter by Proculus that was cited by Gibbon and that is perhaps fictitious, but notable regardless. It begins with an apparent boast about his sexual prowess: "From Proculus to his kinsman Maecianus, greeting. I have taken one hundred maidens from Sarmatia. Of these I mated with ten in a single night..." and with all one hundred within a fortnight. Gibbon comments of Proculus and his co-usurper Bonosus, a heavy drinker, that the "distinguished merit of those two officers was their respective prowess, of the one in the combats of Bacchus, of the other in those of Venus".
