= Julius Saturninus =

- Usurper of the Roman Empire
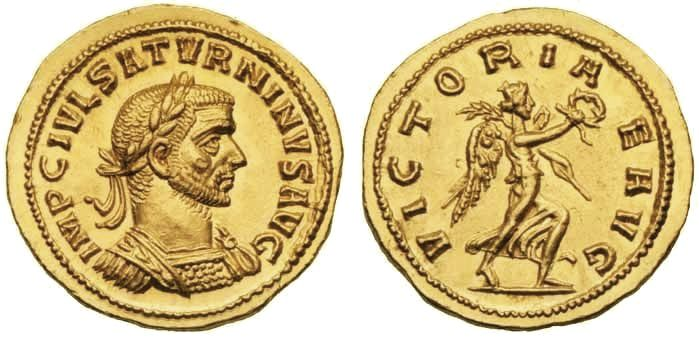
- Reign: 280
- Born: Africa
- Died: 280; Palestine
Names
- Gaius Julius Sallustius Saturninus Fortunatianus
Regnal name
- Imperator Caesar Julius Saturninus Augustus

Julius Saturninus (died 280/281 AD) was a Roman usurper against Emperor Probus. He was probably the same man as Gaius Julius Sallustius Saturninus Fortunatianus, legate in Numidia under Gallienus and suffect consul around 260 AD.

Saturninus was an African by birth (others have him as a Gaul, probably a mistake), and studied rhetoric in Africa and Rome. He was a friend of Probus, who appointed him governor of Syria around 279. After Probus had left Syria for the Rhine in 280, unruly soldiers and the people of Alexandria pressured a reluctant Saturninus to accept imperial office. Having fled from Egypt, he changed his mind in Palestine and proclaimed himself emperor. Ancient sources conflict on what happened next: the Historia Augusta states that Probus sent men to kill the usurper, while according to an account by Zosimus, before Probus could respond to the threat, Saturninus was dead, killed by his own troops.

Only two of Saturninus' coins have survived, both aurei, both depicting Victoria on the reverse. As their obverse and reverse dies are slightly different, it can be assumed Saturninus minted a quantity of these, rather than being standalone medallions. The first coin was discovered prior to 1895 in a hoard in Banha, and was last sold in 1996 for $411,480, while a second was found in 1898, and remains in the Cabinet des Medailles. These coins, as well as an extremely rare issue with the portrait of Probus, were minted by Saturninus in Antioch.

== See also ==
- Julia gens
- Sallustia gens
