= Probus (emperor) =

Roman emperor from 276 to 282

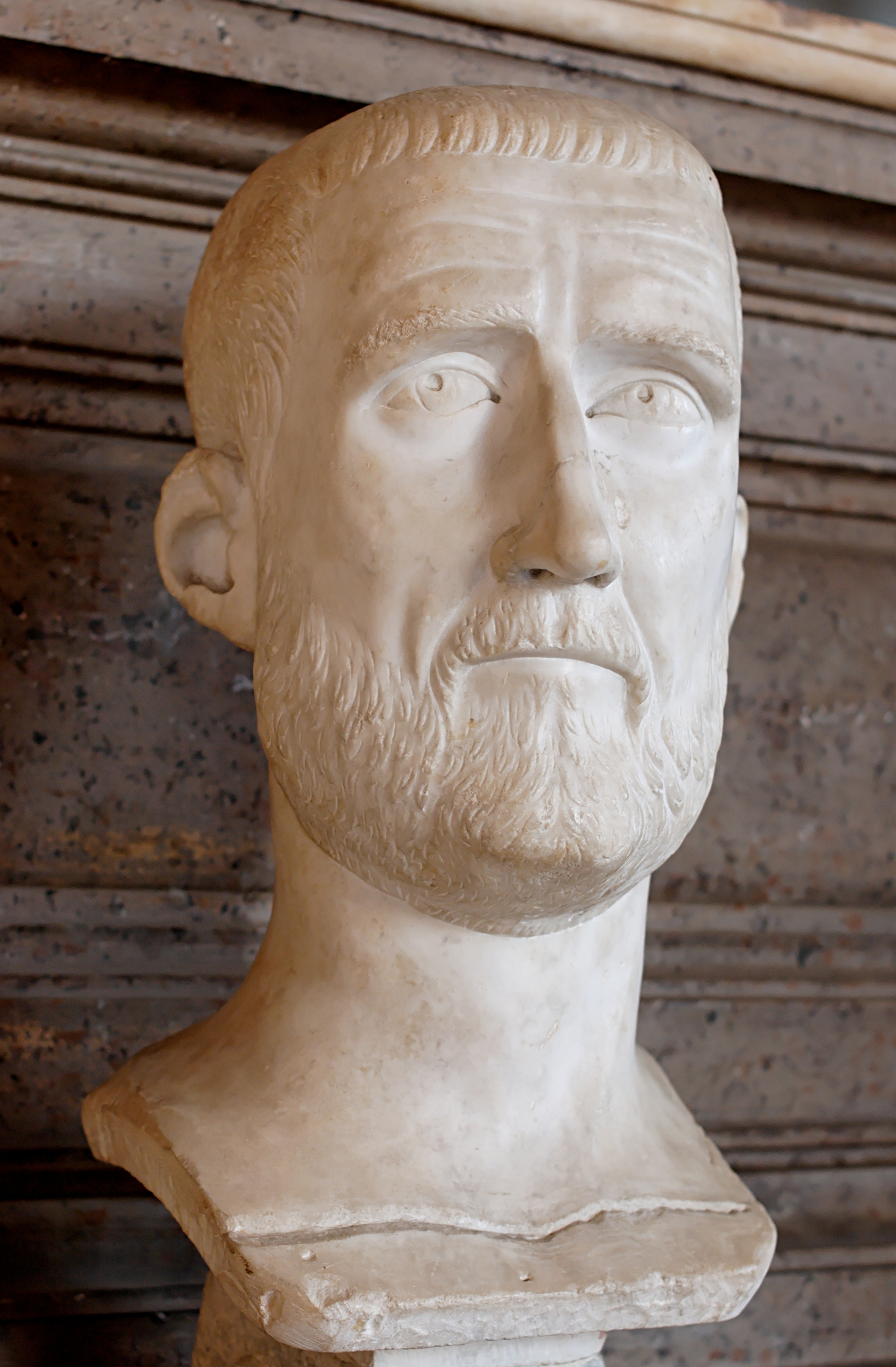
- Over-life-sized marble bust in the Capitoline Museums, Rome

Roman emperor
- Reign: c. June 276 – September 282
- Predecessor: Tacitus and Florian
- Successor: Carus
- Born: between 230 and 235; Sirmium, Pannonia Inferior, modern day Serbia
- Died: September 282 (aged around 50); Sirmium
- Issue: Had descendants
Names
- Marcus Aurelius Probus
Regnal name
- Imperator Caesar Marcus Aurelius Probus Augustus
- Father: Dalmatius

Marcus Aurelius Probus (/ˈproʊbəs/; 230–235 – September 282) was Roman emperor from 276 to 282. Probus was an active and successful general as well as a conscientious administrator, and in his reign of six years he secured prosperity for the inner provinces while withstanding repeated invasions of barbarian tribes on almost every sector of the frontier.

After repelling the foreign enemies of the empire, Probus was forced to handle several internal revolts but demonstrated leniency and moderation to the vanquished wherever possible. Despite the military basis of his power, he presented himself as a constitutional monarch who respected the authority of the Roman Senate.

Upon defeating the Germans, Probus re-erected the fortifications of emperor Hadrian between the Rhine and Danube rivers, protecting the Agri Decumates, and exacted from the vanquished a tribute of manpower to resettle depopulated provinces within the empire and provide for adequate defense of the frontiers. Despite his widespread popularity, Probus was killed in a mutiny of the soldiers while in the middle of preparations for the Persian war, which would be carried out under his successor Carus.

== Early life ==
Probus was born between 230 and 235 (exact date of birth unknown) in Sirmium (modern day Sremska Mitrovica, Serbia), Pannonia Inferior, the son of Dalmatius. According to the Alexandrian Chronicle, he was born sometime in the year 232. The Historia Augusta gives his father's name as Maximus and claims that his mother was of higher status than his father, that he had a sister named Claudia, that he was related to emperor Claudius Gothicus, his personal wealth was modest and his nearest kin unimportant. Besides his best known nomina Aurelius which can be found on most inscriptions, papyri and coinage, as well as Equitius attested on his coins from Ticinum and Pseudo-Aurelius Victor, the Historia Augusta gives him Valerius and Malalas Aelius. Patriarch Nikephoros I of Constantinople (806 - 815) claimed Probus had a brother named Dometius of Byzantium who was the Bishop of Byzantium from about 272 until his death in 284, and a nephew also called Probus, who would also become bishop. This, however, remains an unlikely familiar relation. No other source mentions this.

== Military career ==
Probus entered the army around 25 upon reaching adulthood. He rose rapidly through the ranks, repeatedly earning high military decorations. Appointed at a very young age as a military tribune by the emperor Valerian, in recognition of his latent ability, he justified the choice by a distinguished victory over the Sarmatians on the Illyrian frontier. During the chaotic years of the reign of Valerian, Illyria was the only province, generaled by such officers as Claudius, Aurelian and Probus, where the barbarians were kept at bay, while Gaul was overrun by the Franks, Rhaetia by the Alemans, Thrace and the Mediterranean by the Goths, and the east by Shapur I. Probus became amongst the highest placed lieutenants of Aurelian, reconquering Egypt from Zenobia in 273 A.D. Emperor Tacitus, upon his accession in 275, appointed Probus supreme chief of the east, granting him extraordinary powers in order to secure a dangerous frontier. Though the details are not specified, he is said to have fought with success on almost every frontier of the empire, before his election as emperor by the troops upon Tacitus' death in 276, in his camp in Asia Minor.

== As emperor ==
Florian, the half-brother of Tacitus, also proclaimed himself emperor, and took control of Tacitus' army in Asia Minor, but was killed by his own soldiers after an indecisive campaign against Probus in the mountains of Cilicia. In contrast to Florian, who ignored the wishes of the Senate, Probus referred his claim to Rome in a respectful dispatch, which the Senate enthusiastically ratified. Probus next travelled west, defeating the Goths along the lower Danube in 277, and acquiring the title of Gothicus. However, the Goths came to respect his ability and implored for a treaty with the empire.

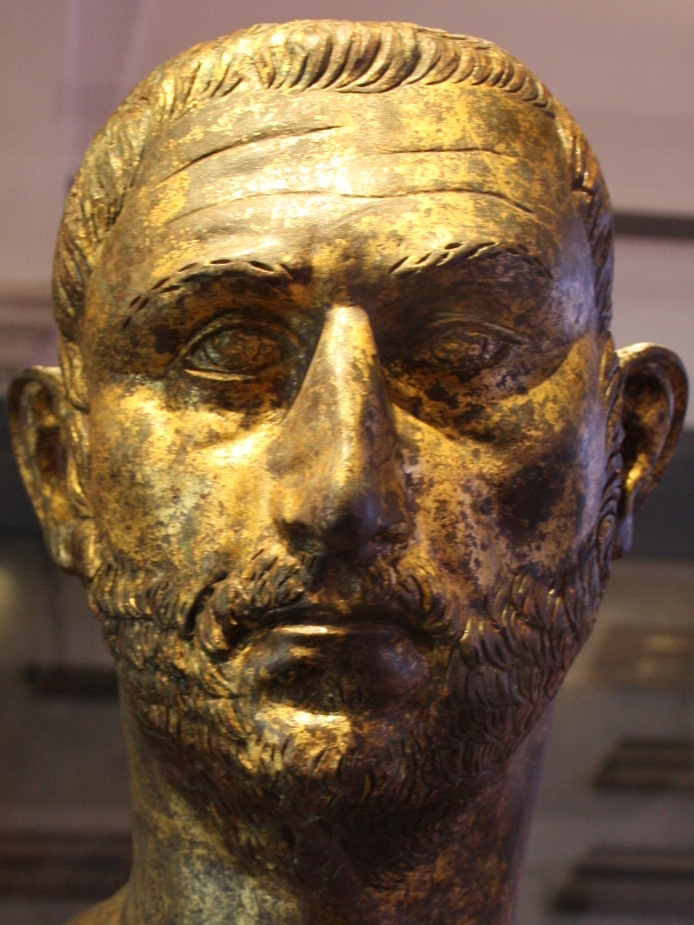
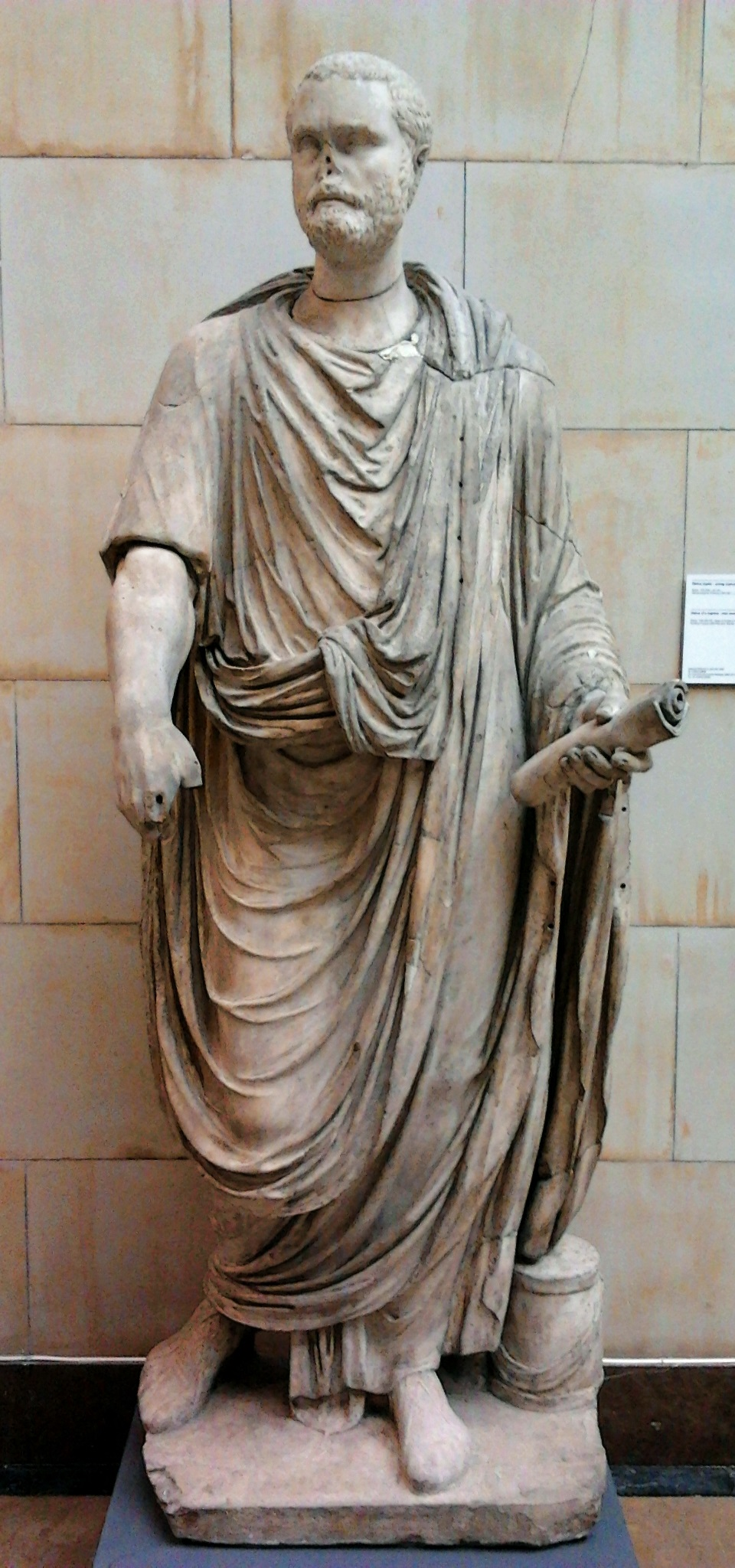
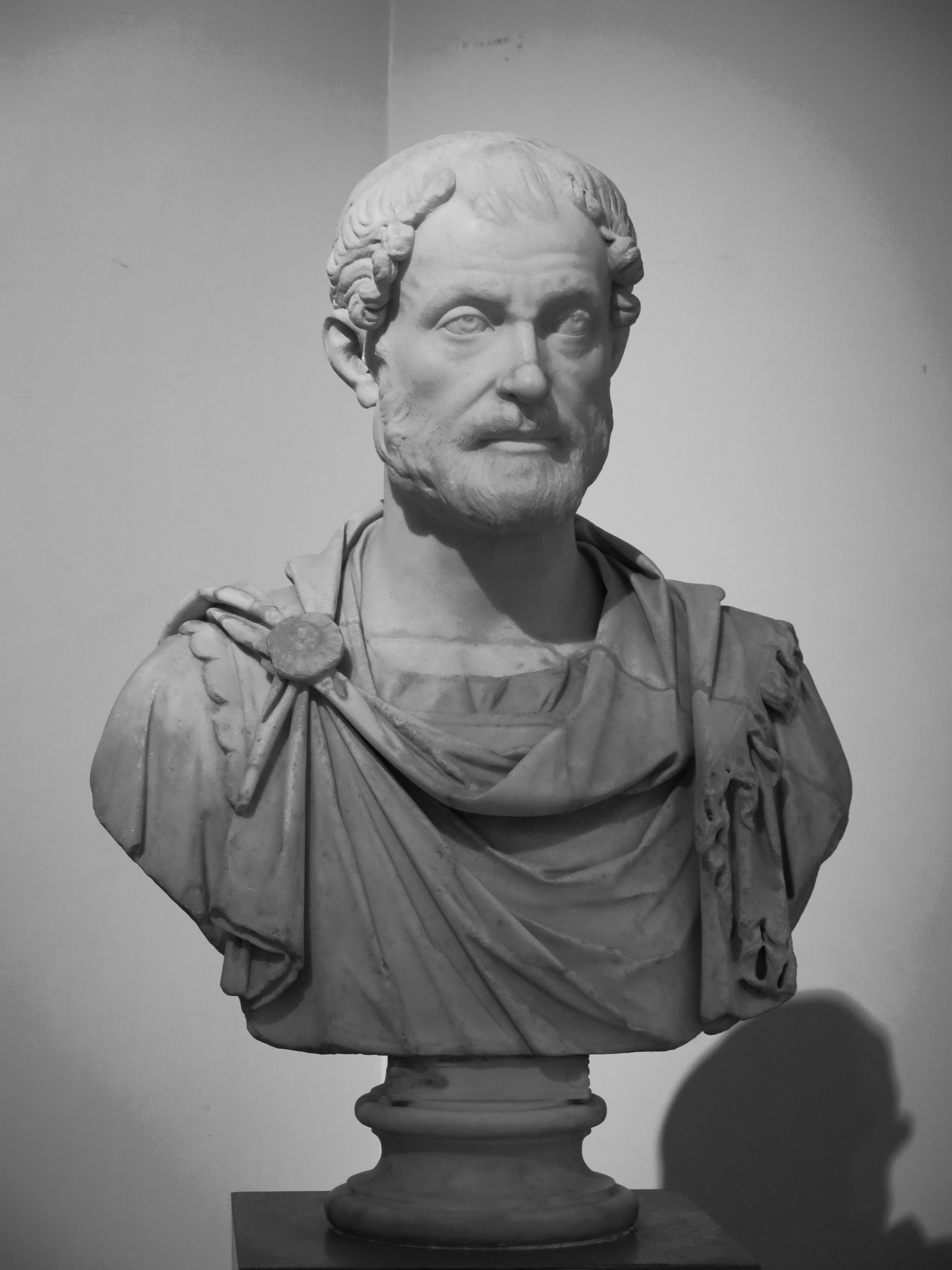
Upper left: gilded bronze head of Probus from Brescia in northern Italy. Upper right: late 3rd century head of Probus mounted on an older (2nd c.) body. Loan from the Louvre displayed in the National Museum in Warsaw. Lower image: Marble bust of Probus in the Museum of Naples.

In 278, Probus campaigned successfully in Gaul against the Alemanni and Lugii; both tribes had advanced through the Neckar valley and across the Rhine into Roman territory. Meanwhile, his generals were directed to clear out Roman Gaul of invading Frankish and Burgundian raiders. After which Probus adopted the titles of Gothicus Maximus and Germanicus Maximus. Reportedly, 400,000 invaders were killed during Probus' campaign, and the entire nation of the Lugii were extirpated.

After the defeat of the Germanic invaders in Gaul, Probus crossed the Rhine to campaign successfully in their homeland, in the end forcing them to pay homage. In the aftermath of the campaign, Probus repaired the ancient fortifications erected by Hadrian in the vulnerable territory of Swabia, between the Rhine and Danube. Probus possibly advanced as far as the Elbe, but ultimately decided against annexing all of Germania and instead accepted the submission of nine major tribes, who pledged to provide recruits for his army. More significantly, by forcing a tribute of manpower from the vanquished tribes, Probus had established the precedent of bringing foreign soldiers into the empire as auxiliaries on a large scale as well as allowing tribes to settle in Roman territory. As the provinces were depopulated by war, disease, chaotic administration, heavy taxation, and extensive army recruitment during the Crisis of the Third Century, the new barbarian colonies, at least in the short term, helped to shore up frontier defense and food production.

The army discipline which Aurelian had repaired was cultivated and extended under Probus, who was less inclined to implement acts of cruelty. One of his principles was never to allow the soldiers to be idle, and to employ them in time of peace on useful works, such as the planting of vineyards in Gaul, Pannonia and other districts, in order to restart the economy in these devastated lands.

In 279–280, Probus was, according to Zosimus, in Raetia, Illyricum and Lycia, where he fought the Vandals. In the same years, Probus' generals defeated the Blemmyes in Egypt. Either then, or during his previous command in Egypt, he ordered the reconstruction of bridges and canals along the Nile, where the production of grain for the Empire was centered.

In 280–281, Probus put down three usurpers, Julius Saturninus, Proculus and Bonosus. The extent of these revolts is not clear, but there are clues that they were not just local problems, as erasures of Probus' name have been found in places like Spain. Following this, Probus put down a revolt by an unnamed rebel king in Britain with the assistance of a man named Victorinus, who was later made consul in 282. During the winter of 281, the emperor was in Rome, where he celebrated a triumph.

Probus was eager to start his eastern campaign, which had been continuously delayed by the revolts in the west. He left Rome in 282, travelling first towards Sirmium, his birth city.

=== Assassination ===
Different accounts of Probus's death exist. According to Joannes Zonaras, the commander of the Praetorian Guard Marcus Aurelius Carus had been proclaimed, more or less unwillingly, emperor by his troops.

Probus in turn sent some of his men against this new usurper, but when they changed sides and supported Carus instead, the Emperor's remaining soldiers decided to assassinate him at Sirmium sometime in September or October of 282. According to other sources, however, Probus was killed by disgruntled soldiers, who rebelled against his orders to be employed for civic purposes, like draining marshes. Allegedly, the soldiers were provoked when they overheard him lamenting the necessity of a standing army. Carus was proclaimed emperor after Probus' passing and avenged the murder of his predecessor by putting the killers to death.

== Legacy ==
According to the favorable treatment of Gibbon (whose account is largely derived from the Augustan History), Probus was the last of the benevolent constitutional emperors of Rome. While his successor Carus (Imp. 282–284) simply disdained to seek the Senate's confirmation of his title, the latter's successor Diocletian (Imp. 284–305) took active measures to undermine its authority, and established the autocratic nature and divine derivation of the Imperial power. Never again, after Diocletian's reforms, would the Roman Senate play an active role in the management of the empire. On the military sphere, Probus' victories continued the succession of martial Illyrian emperors begun by Claudius Gothicus, which restored the military supremacy of Rome after defeats sustained during the Crisis of the Third Century.

== Coinage ==
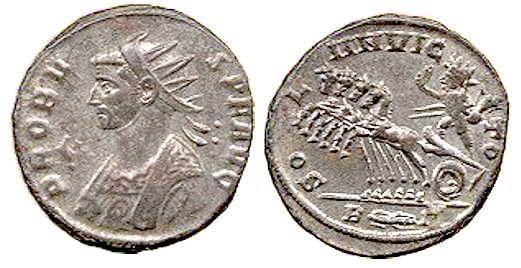
Antoninianus of Probus minted in 280. The reverse depicts the solar divinity Sol Invictus riding a quadriga.Legend: PROBVS P. F. AVG.

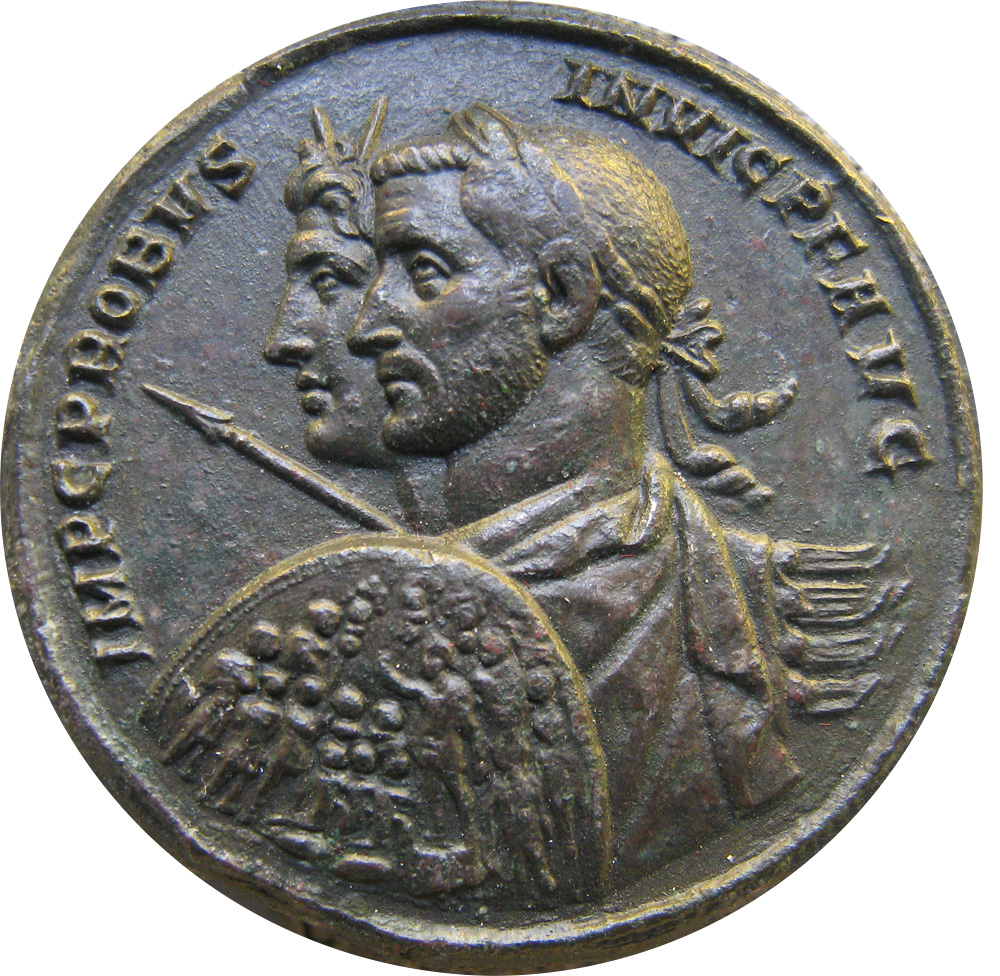
Coin of c. 280 AD depicting Probus and Sol Invictus. The inscription reads: IMP·C·PROBUS·INVIC·P·F·AUG ("Emperor Caesar Probus, Unconquered, Pious, Blessed")

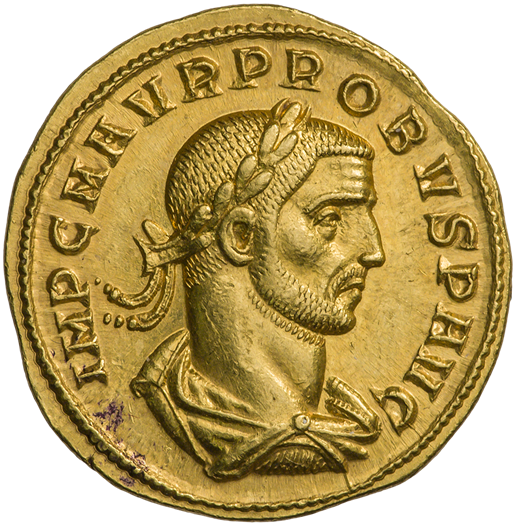
Gold aureus of Probus, marked: IMP C MAVR PROBVS P AVG.

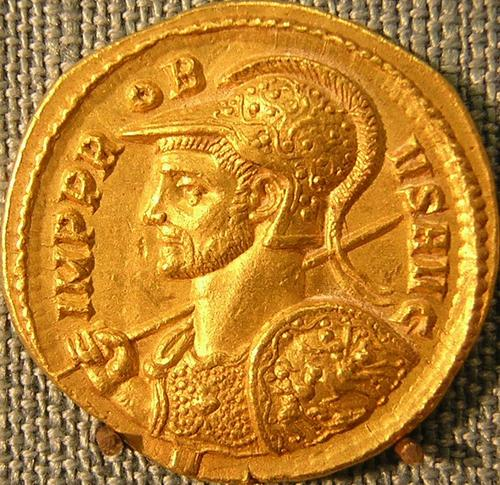
Gold coin of Probus in military armour. Legend: IMP. PROBVS AVG.

== Sources ==
=== Ancient sources ===
- Aurelius Victor, Epitome de Caesaribus
- Eutropius, Breviarium ab urbe condita
- Historia Augusta, Life of Probus
- Joannes Zonaras, Compendium of History extract: Zonaras: Alexander Severus to Diocletian: 222–284
- Zosimus, Historia Nova

=== Modern sources ===
- Mc Mahon, Robin, "Probus (276–282 A.D.) and Rival Claimants (Proculus, Bonosus, and Saturninus) of the 280s", DIR
- Dennis, Anthony J., "Antoniniani of the Roman Emperor Probus". The Celator, November, 1995, Vol. 9, No. 11.
- Fittschen, Klaus & Zanker, Paul (1985). Katalog der römischen Porträts in den Capitolinischen Museen und den anderen kommunalen Sammlungen der Stadt Rom. 1. Kaiser-und Prinzenbildnisse [Catalogue of Roman Portraits in the Capitoline Museums and other Municipal Museums of the City of Rome] (in German). Mainz: Philipp von Zabern. ISBN 3-8053-0596-6.
- Jones, A.H.M.; J.R. Martindale & J. Morris (1971). The Prosopography of the Later Roman Empire Volume 1: A.D. 260–395. Cambridge University Press. ISBN 0-521-07233-6.
- Kreucher, Gerald (2003). Der Kaiser Marcus Aurelius Probus und seine Zeit (Thesis). Stuttgart: F. Steiner. ISBN 3515083820.
- McCann, Anna Marguerite (1968). The Portraits of Septimius Severus (A.D. 193–211). Memoirs of the American Academy in Rome. Vol. 30. American Academy in Rome, University of Michigan Press. pp. 4–222. doi:10.2307/4238661. ISSN 0065-6801. JSTOR 4238661.
- Peachin, Michael (1990). Roman Imperial Titulature and Chronology, A.D. 235–284. Amsterdam: Gieben. ISBN 90-5063-034-0.
- Southern, Pat (2001). The Roman Empire from Severus to Constantine. Routledge. p. 125. ISBN 0-415-23944-3.
- Gibbon, Edward (1888) History of the Decline and Fall of the Roman Empire
- Wood, Susan (1987). "Child-Emperors and Heirs to Power in Third-Century Portraiture". In Jiří Frel; Arthur Houghton & Marion True (eds.). Ancient Portraits in the J. Paul Getty Museum: Volume 1. Occasional Papers on Antiquities. Vol. 4. Malibu, CA, US: J. Paul Getty Museum. pp. 115–136. ISBN 0-89236-071-2.

Attribution:

Regnal titles
Preceded by Florian	Roman emperor 276–282	Succeeded by Carus
Political offices
Preceded by Tacitus; Aemilianus	Roman consul 277–279 with Paulinus, Virius Lupus, Nonnius Paternus	Succeeded by Messalla; Gratus
Preceded by Messalla; Gratus	Roman consul 281–282 with Junius Tiberianus, Victorinus	Succeeded by Carus; Carinus
