= Maximian =

Roman emperor from 286 to 305

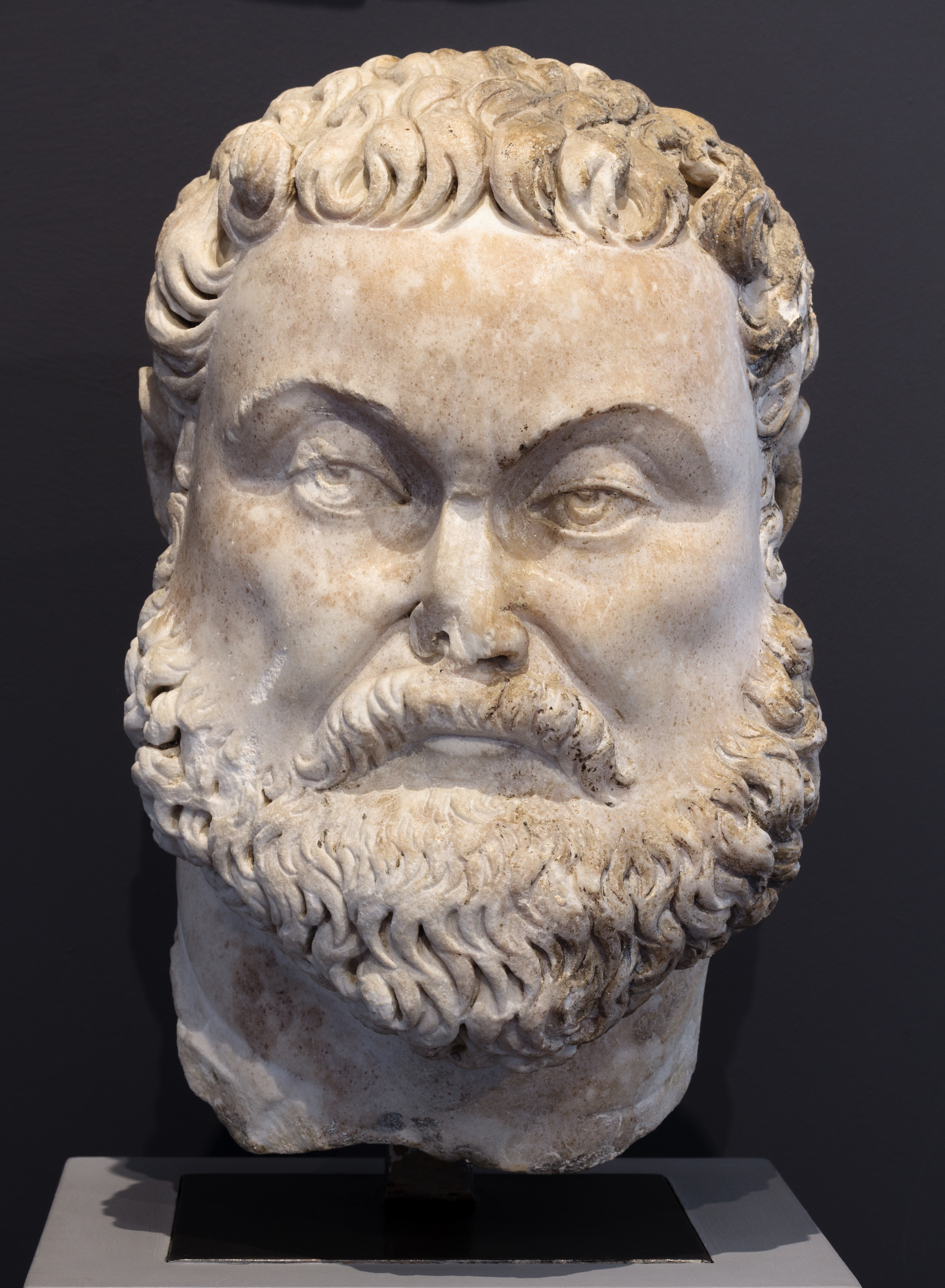
- Portrait head from the villa of Chiragan, now on display at Musée Saint-Raymond, Toulouse

Roman emperor
- Augustus: 1 April 286 – 1 May 305 (with Diocletian in the East)
- Predecessor: Diocletian (alone)
- Successor: Constantius I
- Caesar: 21 or 25 July 285 – 286
- Augustus (rebelled): Late 306 – 11 November 308; 310 (briefly)
- Born: Maximianus c. 250; Sirmium (present-day Sremska Mitrovica, Serbia)
- Died: c. July 310 (aged around 60); Massilia (present-day Marseille, France)
- Spouse: Eutropia
- Issue Detail: Maximiana Theodora; Maxentius; Fausta
Names
- Marcus Aurelius Maximianus; Marcus Aurelius Valerius Maximianus
Regnal name
- Imperator Caesar Marcus Aurelius Valerius Maximianus Augustus
- Religion: Hellenism

Maximian (Latin: Marcus Aurelius Valerius Maximianus; c. 250 – c. July 310), nicknamed Herculius, was Roman emperor from 286 to 305. He was Caesar from 285 to 286, then Augustus from 286 to 305. He shared the latter title with his co-emperor and superior, Diocletian, whose political brain complemented Maximian's military brawn. Maximian established his residence at Trier but spent most of his time on campaign. In late 285, he suppressed rebels in Gaul known as the Bagaudae. From 285 to 288, he fought against Germanic tribes along the Rhine frontier. Together with Diocletian, he launched a scorched earth campaign deep into Alamannic territory in 288, refortifying the frontier.

The man he appointed to police the Channel shores, Carausius, rebelled in 286, causing the secession of Britain and northwestern Gaul. Maximian failed to oust Carausius, and his invasion fleet was destroyed by storms in 289 or 290. Maximian's subordinate Constantius campaigned against Carausius' successor, Allectus, while Maximian held the Rhine frontier. The rebel leader was ousted in 296, and Maximian moved south to combat piracy near Hispania and Berber incursions in Mauretania. When these campaigns concluded in 298, he departed for Italy, where he lived in comfort until 305. At Diocletian's behest, Maximian abdicated on 1 May 305, gave the Augustan office to Constantius, and retired to southern Italy.

In late 306, Maximian took the title of Augustus again and aided his son, Maxentius, and his rebellion in Italy. In April 307, he attempted to depose his son, but failed and fled to the court of Constantius' successor, Constantine (Maximian's step-grandson and son-in-law), in Trier. At the Conference of Carnuntum in November 308, Diocletian and his successor, Galerius, forced Maximian to renounce his imperial claim again. In early 310, Maximian attempted to seize Constantine's title while the emperor was on campaign on the Rhine. Few supported him, and he was captured by Constantine in Marseille. Maximian killed himself in mid-310 on Constantine's orders. During Constantine's war with Maxentius, Maximian's image was purged from all public places. However, after Constantine ousted and killed Maxentius, Maximian's image was rehabilitated, and he was deified.

== Early life ==
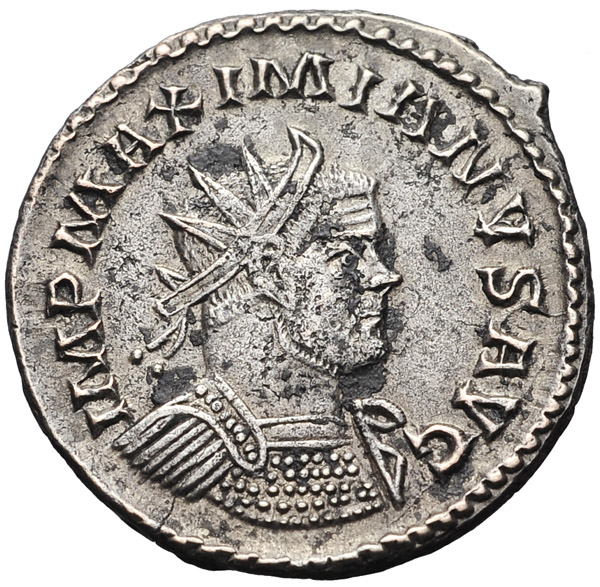
Antoninianus of Maximian. Legend: imp maximianus aug.

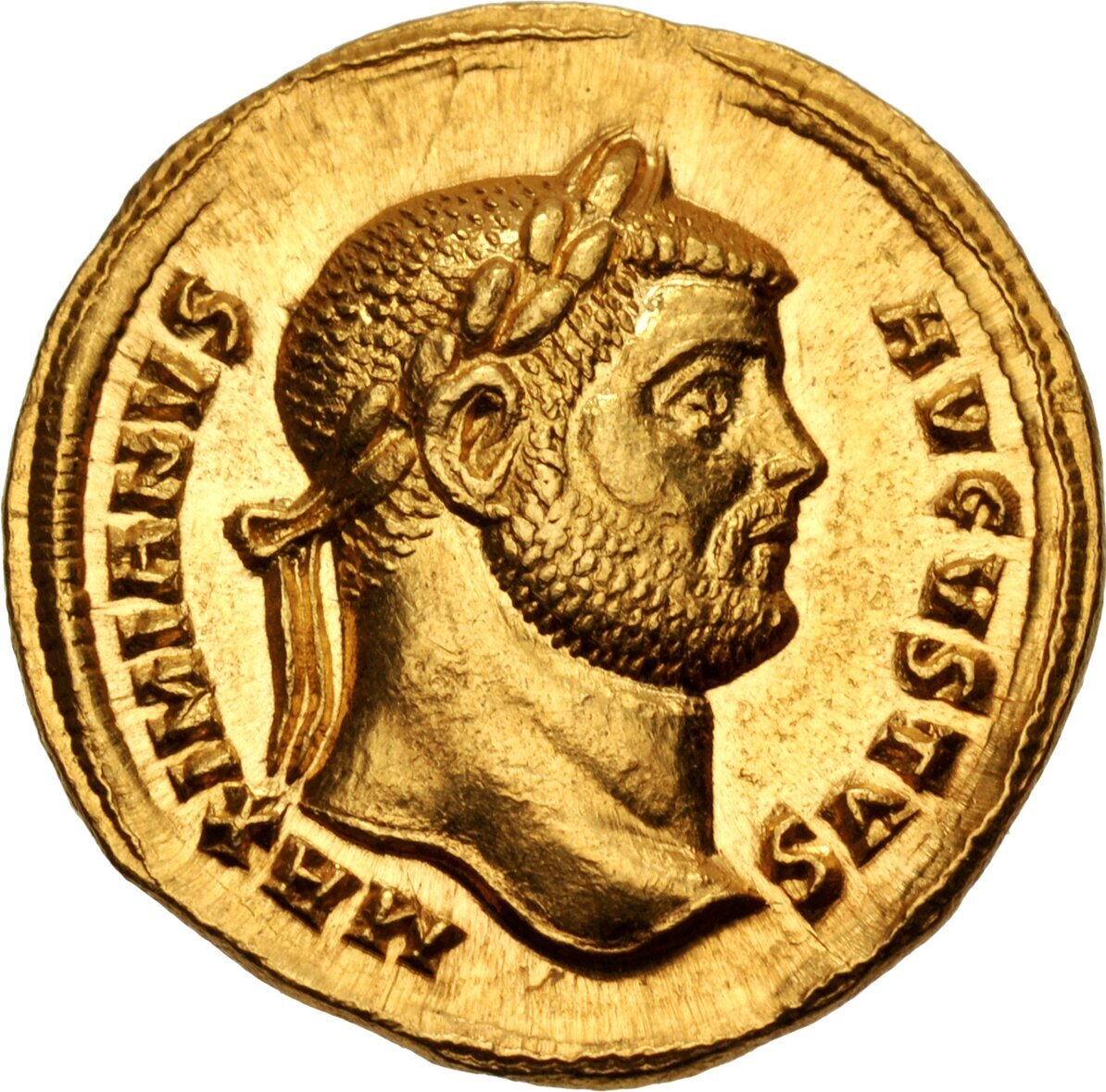
Aureus of Maximian. Legend: maximianus augustus.

Maximian was born around the year 250 near Sirmium (modern Sremska Mitrovica, Serbia) in the province of Pannonia, into a family of shopkeepers. Beyond that, the ancient sources contain vague allusions to Illyricum as his homeland, to his Pannonian virtues, and to his harsh upbringing along the war-torn Danube frontier. Maximian joined the army, serving with Diocletian under the emperors Aurelian (r. 270–275) and Probus (r. 276–282). He probably participated in the Mesopotamian campaign of Carus in 283 and attended Diocletian's election as emperor on 20 November 284 at Nicomedia. Maximian's swift appointment by Diocletian as Caesar is taken by the writer Stephen Williams and historian Timothy Barnes to mean that the two men were long-term allies, that their respective roles were pre-agreed and that Maximian had probably supported Diocletian during his campaign against Carinus (r. 283–285) but there is no direct evidence for this.

With his great energy, firm aggressive character and disinclination to rebel, Maximian was an appealing candidate for imperial office. The fourth-century historian Aurelius Victor described Maximian as "a colleague trustworthy in friendship, if somewhat boorish, and of great military talents". Despite his other qualities, Maximian was uneducated and preferred action to thought. The panegyric of 289, after comparing his actions to Scipio Africanus' victories over Hannibal during the Second Punic War, suggested that Maximian had never heard of them. His ambitions were purely military; he left politics to Diocletian. The Christian rhetor Lactantius suggested that Maximian shared Diocletian's basic attitudes but was less puritanical in his tastes, and took advantage of the sensual opportunities his position as emperor offered. Lactantius charged that Maximian defiled senators' daughters and traveled with young virgins to satisfy his unending lust, though Lactantius' credibility is undermined by his general hostility towards pagans.

Maximian had two children with his Syrian wife, Eutropia: Maxentius and Fausta. There is no direct evidence for their birthdates. Maxentius was probably born around 283 (when Maximian was in Syria), and Fausta around 289 or 290. Maximiana Theodora, the wife of Constantius, is often called Maximian's stepdaughter by ancient sources, leading to claims by Otto Seeck and Ernest Stein that she was born from an earlier marriage between Eutropia and Afranius Hannibalianus. Barnes challenges this view, saying that all "stepdaughter" sources derive their information from the partially unreliable work of history Kaisergeschichte, while other, more reliable, sources refer to her as Maximian's natural daughter. Barnes concludes that Theodora was born no later than c. 275 to an unnamed earlier wife of Maximian, possibly one of Hannibalianus' daughters. Julia Hillner agrees with Barnes that the "stepdaughter sources" are a result of political propaganda from the later Constantinian dynasty but believes that Barnes explanation fails to explain why Theodora named one of her daughters Eutropia if her mother was an unknown Afrania instead of empress Eutropia. Hillner argues that Afranius Hannibalianus was Eutropia's brother and that Theodora was the daughter of both Maximian and Eutropia. This is in line with John Vanderspoel.

== Appointment as Caesar ==
At Mediolanum (Milan, Italy) probably in July 285, Diocletian appointed Maximian as his heir-apparent and subordinate, with the title Caesar. The reasons for this decision are complex. With conflict in every province of the Empire, from Gaul to Syria, from Egypt to the lower Danube, Diocletian needed a lieutenant to manage his heavy workload. Historian Stephen Williams suggests that Diocletian considered himself a mediocre general and needed a man like Maximian to do most of his fighting.

The general consensus is that Maximian was appointed Caesar before being proclaimed Augustus (the official term for "emperor"), as stated by the contemporary writer Eusebius. However, some modern scholars have doubted this, as there is virtually no evidence for this. Even brief Caesars like Volusianus and Numerian, who only held the title for a few months, had coins minted in their names. Historian Richard Burgess argues that Maximian was never Caesar, and that his appointment as Augustus actually took place on 13 December 285, as opposed to the traditional date of 1 April 286, which has already been put into question by other authors.

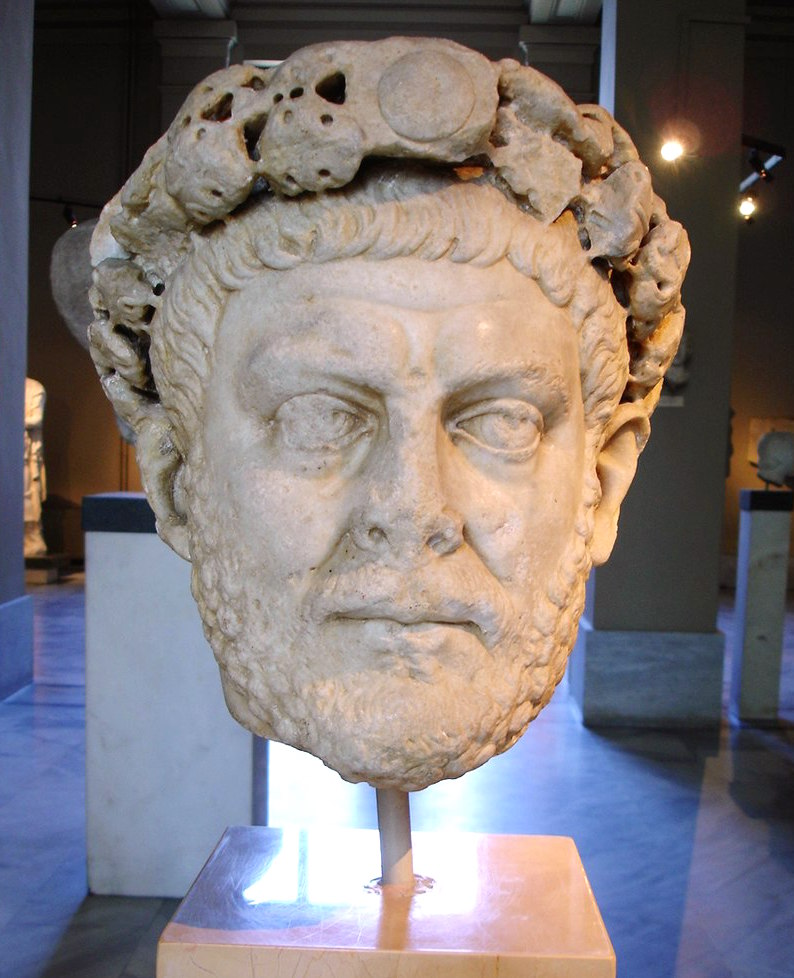
Diocletian, Maximian's senior colleague and Augustus in the east.

Diocletian was vulnerable in that he had no sons, just a daughter, Valeria, who could never succeed him. He was forced therefore to seek a co-ruler from outside his family and that co-ruler had to be someone he trusted. The historian William Seston has argued that Diocletian, like heirless emperors before him, adopted Maximian as his filius Augusti ("Augustan son") upon his appointment to the office. Some agree, but the historian Frank Kolb has stated that arguments for the adoption are based on misreadings of the papyrological evidence. Maximian did take Diocletian's nomen (family name) Valerius, however.

Finally, Diocletian knew that single rule was dangerous and that precedent existed for dual rulership. Despite their military prowess, both sole-emperors Aurelian and Probus had been easily removed from power. In contrast, just a few years earlier, the emperor Carus and his sons had ruled jointly, albeit not for long. Even the first emperor, Augustus (r. 27 BC–AD 14), had shared power with his colleagues and more formal offices of co-emperor had existed from Marcus Aurelius (r. 161–180) on.

The dual system evidently worked well. Around 287, after Maximian's appointment as Augustus, the two rulers' relationship was re-defined in religious terms, with Diocletian assuming the title Iovius and Maximian Herculius. The titles were pregnant with symbolism: Diocletian-Jove had the dominant role of planning and commanding; Maximian-Hercules the heroic role of completing assigned tasks. Yet despite the symbolism, the emperors were not "gods" in the Imperial cult (although they may have been hailed as such in Imperial panegyrics). Instead, they were the gods' instruments, imposing the gods' will on earth. Once the rituals were over, Maximian assumed control of the government of the West and was dispatched to Gaul to fight the rebels known as Bagaudae while Diocletian returned to the East.

== Early campaigns in Gaul and Germany ==
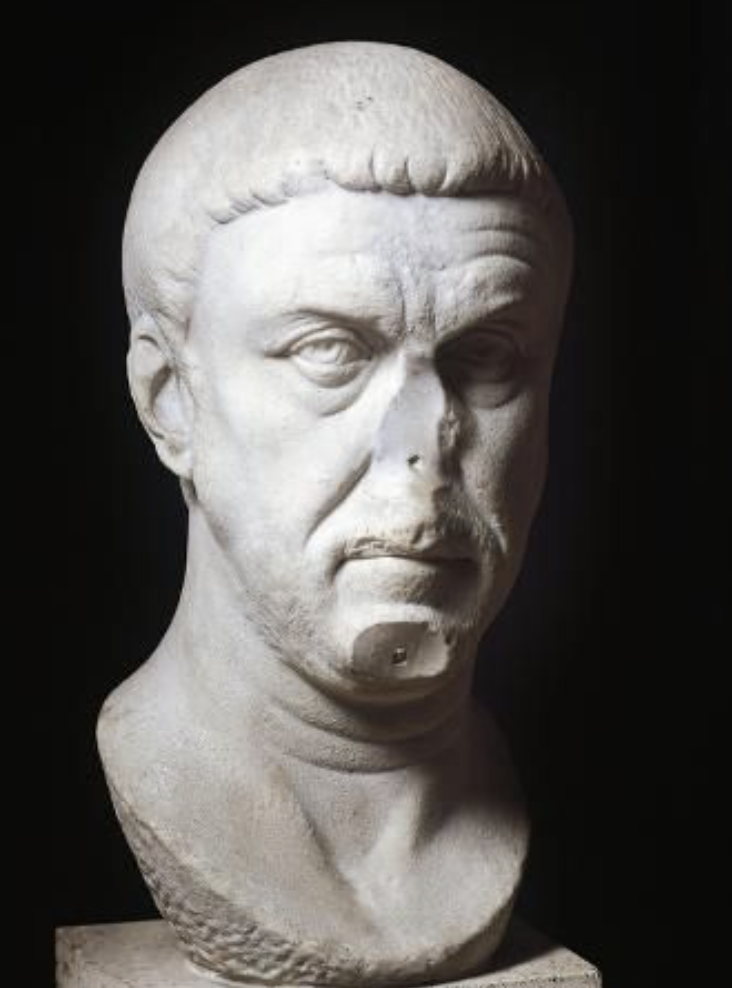
Over life-sized marble head of a Tetrarch, possibly Maximian or Diocletian, found in Italy.

The Bagaudae of Gaul are obscure figures, appearing fleetingly in the ancient sources, with their 285 uprising being their first appearance. The fourth-century historian Eutropius described them as rural people under the leadership of Amandus and Aelianus, while Aurelius Victor called them bandits. The historian David Potter suggests that they were more than peasants, seeking either Gallic political autonomy or reinstatement of the recently deposed Carus (a native of Gallia Narbonensis, in what would become southern France): in this case, they would be defecting imperial troops, not brigands. Although poorly equipped, led and trained – and therefore a poor match for Roman legions – Diocletian certainly considered the Bagaudae sufficient threat to merit an emperor to counter them. Maximian has been implicated in a massacre of Coptic Christian troops from the headquarters unit of a legion raised in Thebes at Aucanus in modern Switzerland in early 285, during the preparations for the campaign against the Bagaudae.

Maximian traveled to Gaul, engaging the Bagaudae late in mid-285. Details of the campaign are sparse and provide no tactical detail: the historical sources dwell only on Maximian's virtues and victories. The panegyric to Maximian in 289 records that the rebels were defeated with a blend of harshness and leniency. As the campaign was against the Empire's own citizens, and therefore distasteful, it went unrecorded in titles and official triumphs. Indeed, Maximian's panegyrist declares: "I pass quickly over this episode, for I see in your magnanimity you would rather forget this victory than celebrate it." By the end of the year, the revolt had significantly abated, and Maximian moved the bulk of his forces to the Rhine frontier, heralding a period of stability.

Maximian did not put down the Bagaudae swiftly enough to avoid a Germanic reaction. In late 285, two barbarian armies – one of Burgundians and Alamanni, the other of Chaibones and Heruli – forded the Rhine and entered Gaul. The first army was left to die of disease and hunger, while Maximian intercepted and defeated the second. He then established a Rhine headquarters in preparation for future campaigns, either at Moguntiacum (Mainz, Germany), or at Augusta Treverorum (Trier, Germany),.

== Carausius ==
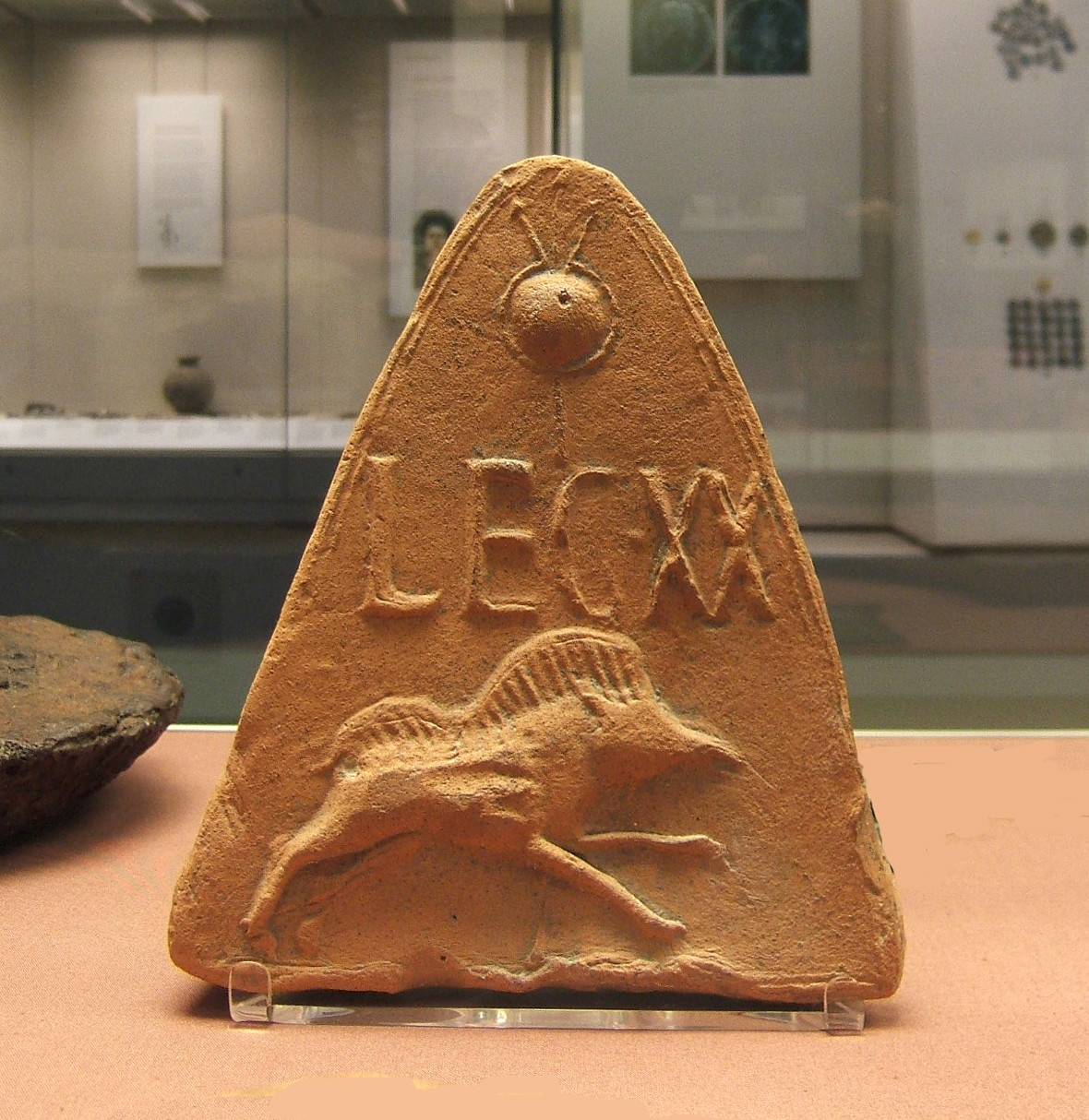
A Roman antefix roof tile showing the badge and standard of Legio XX Valeria Victrix, one of the legions that joined Carausius' rebellion

Although most of Gaul was pacified, regions bordering the English Channel still suffered from Frankish and Saxon piracy. The emperors Probus and Carinus had begun to fortify the Saxon Shore, but much remained to be done. For example, there is no archaeological evidence of naval bases at Dover and Boulogne during 270–285. In response to the pirate problem, Maximian appointed Mausaeus Carausius, a Menapian from Germania Inferior (southern and western Netherlands) to command the Channel and to clear it of raiders. Carausius fared well, and by the end of 285 he was capturing pirate ships in great numbers.

Maximian soon heard that Carausius was waiting until the pirates had finished plundering before attacking and keeping their booty himself instead of returning it to the population at large or into the imperial treasury. Maximian ordered Carausius' arrest and execution, prompting him to flee to Britain. Carausius' support among the British was strong, and at least two British legions (II Augusta and XX Valeria Victrix) defected to him, as did some or all of a legion near Boulogne (probably XXX Ulpia Victrix). (Note: Most of the information for the legions under Carausius' control comes from his coinage. Strangely, Legio VI Victrix from Eboracum (York, United Kingdom), which, for geographical regions, should have been included in the legions Carausius had control over, generally is not. The Panegyrici Latini 8(4)12.1 admits one continental legion joined him, probably the XXX Ulpia Victrix.) Carausius quickly eliminated the few remaining loyalists in his army and declared himself Augustus.

Maximian could do little about the revolt. He had no fleet – he had given it to Carausius – and was busy quelling the Heruli and the Franks. Meanwhile, Carausius strengthened his position by enlarging his fleet, enlisting Frankish mercenaries, and paying his troops well. By late 286, Britain, much of northwestern Gaul, and the entire Channel coast, was under his control. Carausius declared himself head of an independent British state, an Imperium Britanniarum and issued coin of a markedly higher purity than that of Maximian and Diocletian, earning the support of British and Gallic merchants. Even Maximian's troops were vulnerable to Carausius' influence and wealth.

== Maximian appointed Augustus ==
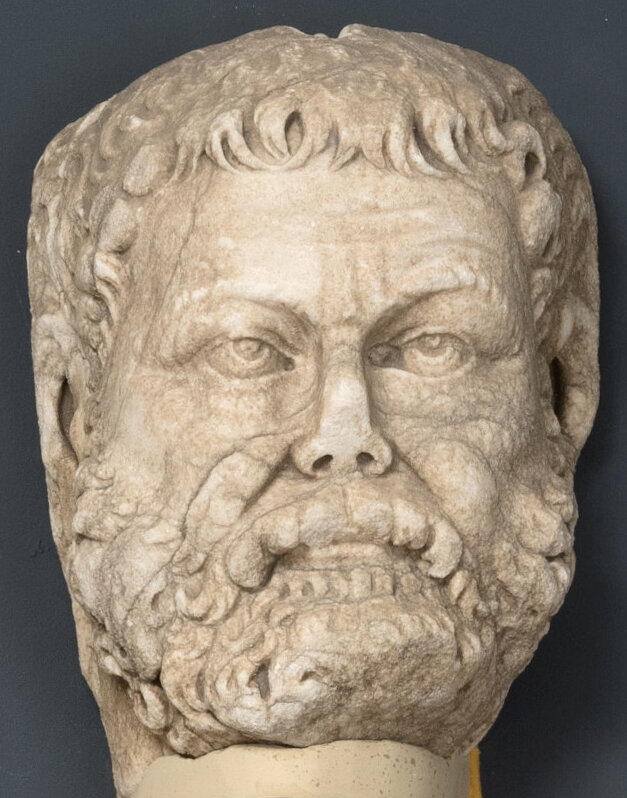
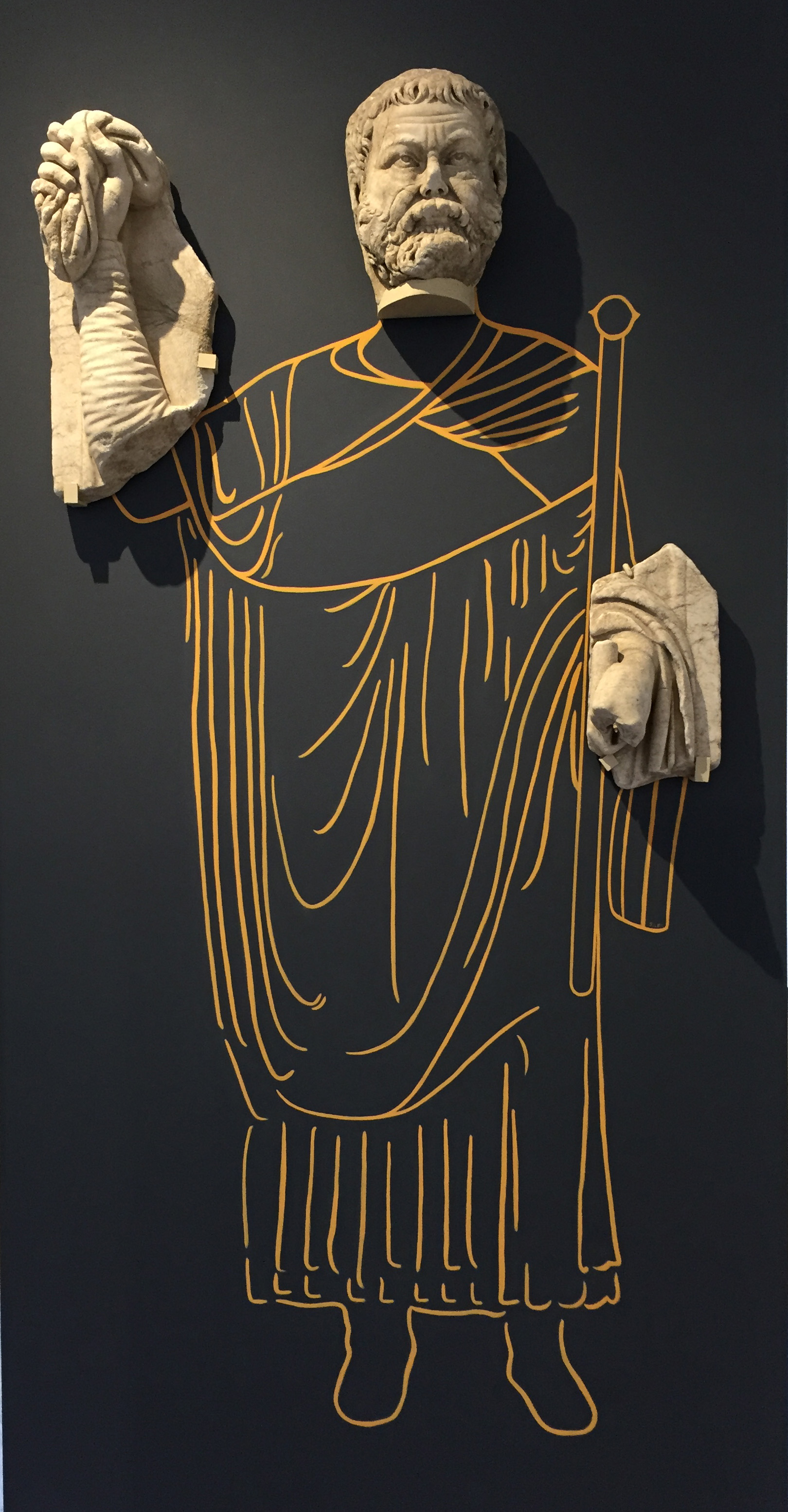
Fragmentary high relief statue of Maximian from the villa of Chiragan, Musée Saint-Raymond.

Spurred by the crisis with Carausius, on 1 April 286, (Note: The chronology of Maximian's appointment as emperor is somewhat uncertain (Corcoran 2006, p. 40; Southern 2001, p. 142). As explained before, it is sometimes argued that Maximian was directly appointed emperor in 285. This suggestion has not received much support (Potter 2004, p. 281; Southern 2001, p. 142; following De Casearibus 39.17).) Maximian took the title of Augustus (emperor). This gave him the same status as Carausius – so the clash was between two Augusti, rather than between an Augustus and a Caesar – and, in Imperial propaganda, Maximian was proclaimed Diocletian's brother, his equal in authority and prestige. Diocletian could not have been present at Maximian's appointment, as he was somewhere between Byzantium (Istanbul, Turkey), where he is attested for 22 March 286, and Tiberias, where he is attested from 31 May 286 through 31 August. Otto Seeck suggests that Maximian usurped the title and was only later recognized by Diocletian in hopes of avoiding civil war. This suggestion has not won much support, and the historian William Leadbetter has recently refuted it. Despite the physical distance between the emperors, Diocletian trusted Maximian enough to invest him with imperial powers, and Maximian still respected Diocletian enough to act in accordance with his will.

In theory, the Roman Empire was not divided by the dual imperium. Though divisions did take place – each emperor had his own court, army, and official residences – these were matters of practicality, not substance. Imperial propaganda from 287 on insists on a singular and indivisible Rome, a patrimonium indivisum. As the panegyrist of 289 declares to Maximian: "So it is that this great empire is a communal possession for both of you, without any discord, nor would we endure there to be any dispute between you, but plainly you hold the state in equal measure as once those two Heracleidae, the Spartan Kings, had done." Legal rulings were given and imperial celebrations took place in both emperors' names, and the same coins were issued in both parts of the empire. Diocletian sometimes issued commands to Maximian's province of Africa; Maximian could presumably have done the same for Diocletian's territory.

== Campaigns against Rhenish tribes ==
=== Campaigns in 286 and 287 ===
Maximian realized that he could not immediately suppress Carausius and campaigned instead against Rhenish tribes. These tribes were probably greater threats to Gallic peace anyway and included many supporters of Carausius. Although Maximian had many enemies along the river, they were more often in dispute with each other than in combat with the Empire. Few clear dates survive for Maximian's campaigns on the Rhine beyond a general range of 285 to 288. (Note: Barnes 1982, p. 57 records five dates for the period: the first, 10 February 286 at Milan (Codex Justinianus 8.53(54).6; Fragmenta Vaticana 282); 21 June 286 at Mainz (Fragmenta Vaticana 271); 1 January 287 Trier or Cologne or Mainz (date of consular assumption, Panegyrici Latini 10(2).6.2 ff.); and 287, his "expedition across the Rhine" (Panegyrici Latini 10(2).7.1ff.).) While receiving the consular fasces on 1 January 287, Maximian was interrupted by news of a barbarian raid. Doffing his toga and donning his armor, he marched against the barbarians and, although they were not entirely dispersed, he celebrated a victory in Gaul later that year.

Maximian believed the Burgundian and Alemanni tribes of the Moselle-Vosges region to be the greatest threat, so he targeted them first. He campaigned using scorched earth tactics, laying waste to their land and reducing their numbers through famine and disease. After the Burgundians and Alemanni, Maximian moved against the weaker Heruli and Chaibones. He cornered and defeated them in a single battle. He fought in person, riding along the battle line until the Germanic forces broke. Roman forces pursued the fleeing tribal armies and routed them. With his enemies weakened from starvation, Maximian launched a great invasion across the Rhine. He moved deep into Germanic territory, bringing destruction to his enemies' homelands. By the end of 287, he had the advantage and the Rhenish lands were free of Germanic tribesmen. Maximian's panegyrist declared: "All that I see beyond the Rhine is Roman."

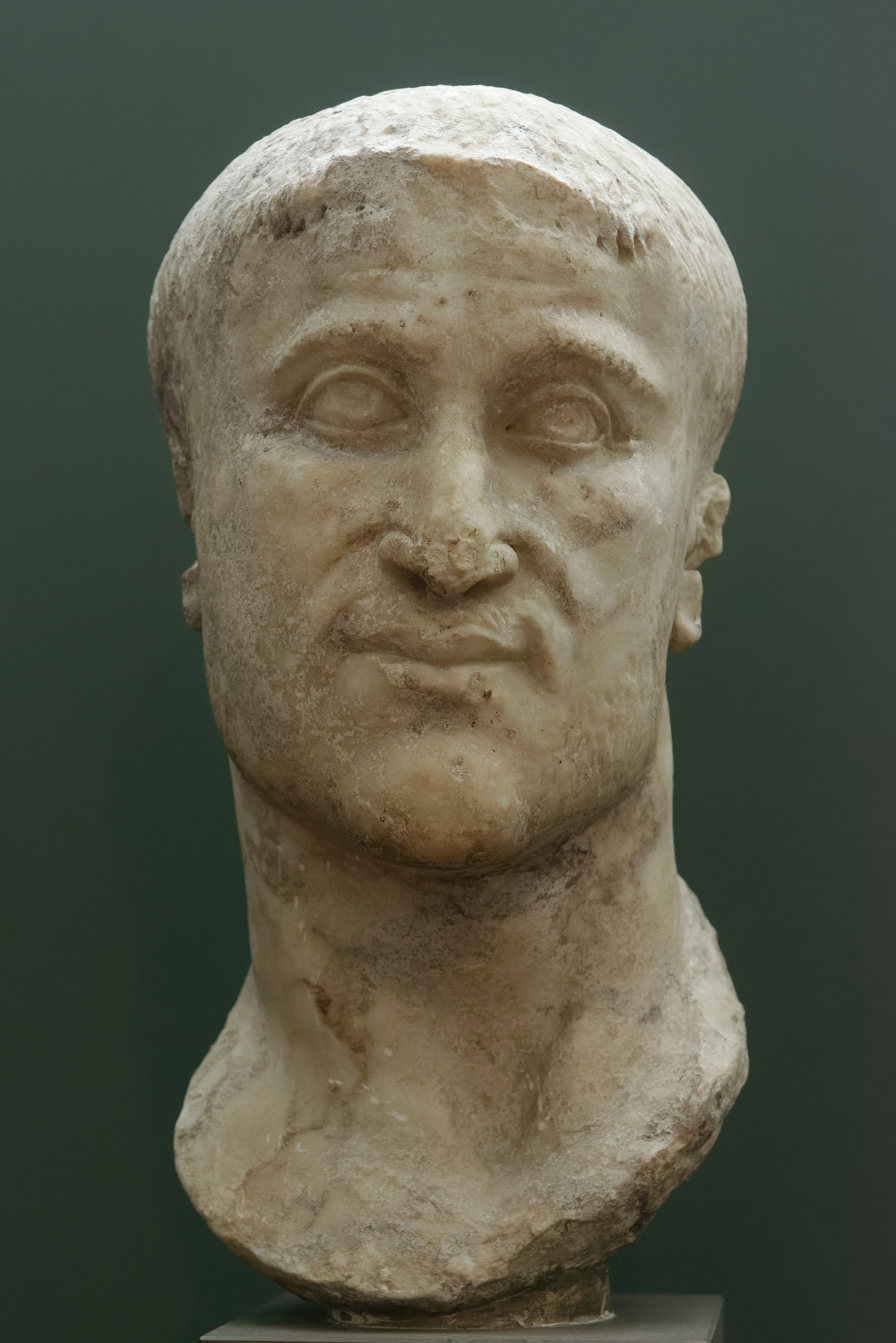
Constantius Chlorus, Maximian's praetorian prefect and husband to his daughter Theodora

=== Joint campaign against the Alamanni ===
Early the next year, as Maximian made preparations for dealing with Carausius, Diocletian returned from the East. The emperors met that year, but neither date nor place is known with certainty. They probably agreed on a joint campaign against the Alamanni and a naval expedition against Carausius.

Later in the year, Maximian led a surprise invasion of the Agri Decumates – a region between the upper Rhine and upper Danube deep within Alamanni territory – while Diocletian invaded Germany via Raetia. Both emperors burned crops and food supplies as they went, destroying the Germans' means of sustenance. They added large swathes of territory to the Empire and allowed Maximian's build-up to proceed without further disturbance. In the aftermath of the war, towns along the Rhine were rebuilt, bridgeheads created on the eastern banks at such places as Mainz and Cologne, and a military frontier was established, comprising forts, roads, and fortified towns. A military highway through Tornacum (Tournai, Belgium), Bavacum (Bavay, France), Atuatuca Tungrorum (Tongeren, Belgium), Mosae Trajectum (Maastricht, Netherlands), and Cologne connected points along the frontier.

=== Constantius, Gennobaudes, and resettlement ===
In early 288, Maximian appointed his praetorian prefect Constantius Chlorus, husband of Maximian's daughter Theodora, to lead a campaign against Carausius' Frankish allies. These Franks controlled the Rhine estuaries, thwarting sea-attacks against Carausius. Constantius moved north through their territory, wreaking havoc, and reaching the North Sea. The Franks sued for peace and in the subsequent settlement Maximian reinstated the deposed Frankish king Gennobaudes. Gennobaudes became Maximian's vassal and, with lesser Frankish chiefs in turn swearing loyalty to Gennobaudes, Roman regional dominance was assured.

Maximian allowed a settlement of Frisii, Salian Franks, Chamavi and other tribes along a strip of Roman territory, either between the Rhine and Waal rivers from Noviomagus (Nijmegen, Netherlands) to Traiectum, (Utrecht, Netherlands) or near Trier. These tribes were allowed to settle on the condition that they acknowledged Roman dominance. Their presence provided a ready pool of manpower and prevented the settlement of other Frankish tribes, giving Maximian a buffer along the northern Rhine and reducing his need to garrison the region.

== Later campaigns in Britain and Gaul ==
=== Failed expedition against Carausius ===
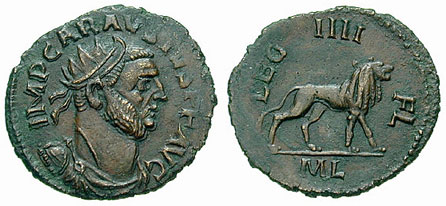
Carausius, rebel emperor of Roman Britain. Legend: IMP. CARAVSIVS P. F. AVG. / LEG IIII FL – ML (Londinium mint)

By 289, Maximian was prepared to invade Carausius' Britain, but for some reason the plan failed. Maximian's panegyrist of 289 was optimistic about the campaign's prospects, but the panegyrist of 291 made no mention of it. Constantius' panegyrist suggested that his fleet was lost to a storm, but this might simply have been to diminish the embarrassment of defeat. Diocletian curtailed his Eastern province tour soon after, perhaps on learning of Maximian's failure. Diocletian returned in haste to the West, reaching Emesa by 10 May 290, and Sirmium on the Danube by 1 July 290.

Diocletian met Maximian in Milan either in late December 290 or January 291. Crowds gathered to witness the event, and the emperors devoted much time to public pageantry. Potter, among others, has surmised that the ceremonies were arranged to demonstrate Diocletian's continuing support for his faltering colleague. The rulers discussed matters of politics and war in secret, and they may have considered the idea of expanding the imperial college to include four rulers (the Tetrarchy). Meanwhile, a deputation from the Roman Senate met with the rulers and renewed its infrequent contact with the imperial office. The emperors would not meet again until 303.

Following Maximian's failure to invade in 289, an uneasy truce with Carausius began. Maximian tolerated Carausius' rule in Britain and on the continent but refused to grant the secessionist state formal legitimacy. For his part, Carausius was content with his territories beyond the Continental coast of Gaul. Diocletian, however, would not tolerate this affront to his rule. Faced with Carausius' secession and further challenges on the Egyptian, Syrian, and Danubian borders, he realized that two emperors were insufficient to manage the Empire. On 1 March 293 at Milan, Maximian appointed Constantius to the office of Caesar. On either the same day or a month later, Diocletian did the same for Galerius, thus establishing the "Tetrarchy", or "rule of four". Constantius was made to understand that he must succeed where Maximian had failed and defeat Carausius.

=== Campaign against Allectus ===
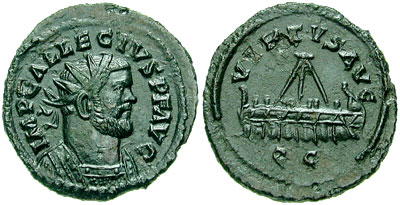
Allectus, Carausius' successor. Legend: IMP. C. ALLECTVS P. F. AVG. / VIRTVS AVGusti – Senatus Consulto

Constantius met expectations quickly and efficiently and by 293 had expelled Carausian forces from northern Gaul. In the same year, Carausius was assassinated and replaced by his treasurer, Allectus. Constantius marched up the coast to the Rhine and Scheldt estuaries where he was victorious over Carausius' Frankish allies, taking the title Germanicus maximus. His sights now set on Britain, Constantius spent the following years building an invasion fleet. Maximian, still in Italy after the appointment of Constantius, was apprised of the invasion plans and, in mid-296, returned to Gaul. There, he held the Rhenish frontiers against Carausius' Frankish allies while Constantius launched his invasion of Britain. Allectus was killed on the North Downs in battle with Constantius' praetorian prefect, Asclepiodotus. Constantius himself had landed near Dubris (Dover) and marched on Londinium (London), whose citizens greeted him as a liberator.

== Campaigns in North Africa ==
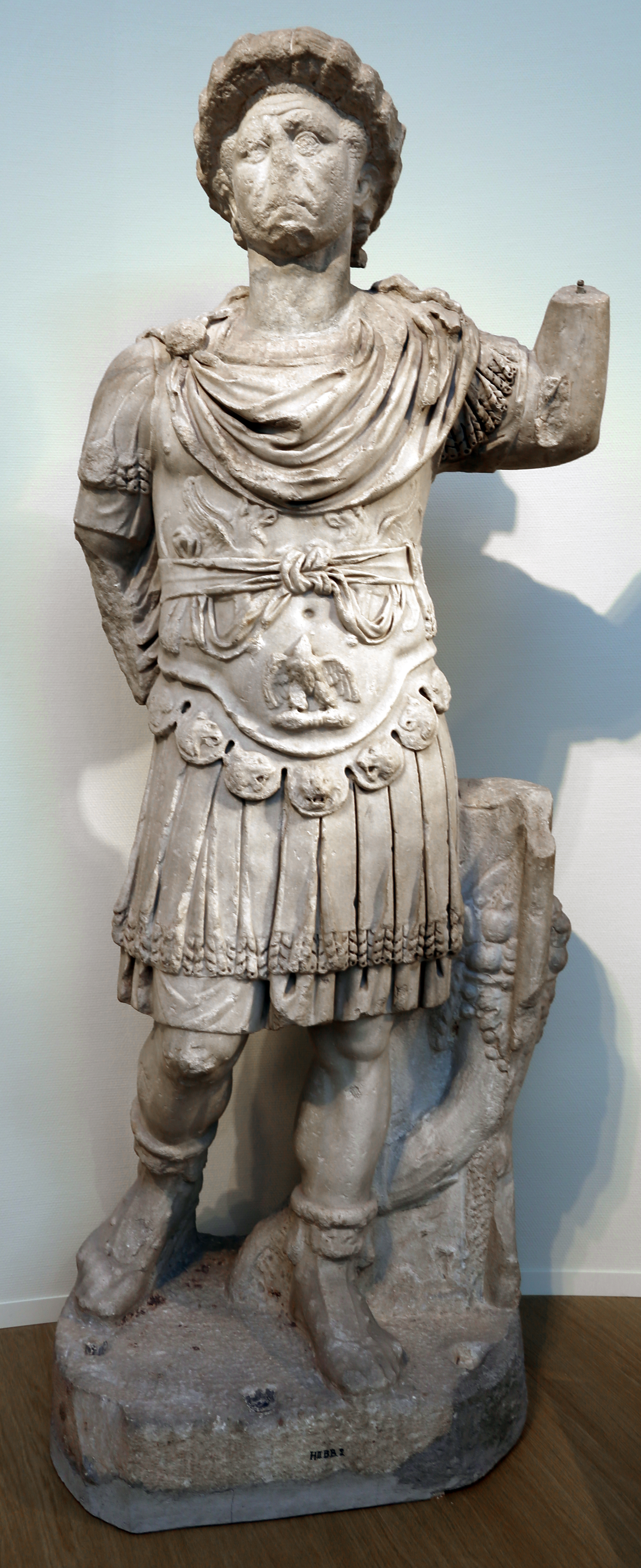
Cuirassed statue of Maximian or Diocletian from the city of Utica in modern Tunisia. Late 3rd century.

With Constantius' victorious return, Maximian was able to focus on the conflict in Mauretania (Northwest Africa). As Roman authority weakened during the third century, nomadic Berber tribes harassed settlements in the region with increasingly severe consequences. In 289, the governor of Mauretania Caesariensis (roughly modern Algeria) gained a temporary respite by pitting a small army against the Bavares and Quinquegentiani, but the raiders soon returned. In 296, Maximian raised an army, from Praetorian cohorts, Aquileian, Egyptian, and Danubian legionaries, Gallic and German auxiliaries, and Thracian recruits, advancing through Spain later that year. He may have defended the region against raiding Moors before crossing the Strait of Gibraltar into Mauretania Tingitana (roughly modern Morocco) to protect the area from Frankish pirates.

By March 297, Maximian had begun a bloody offensive against the Berbers. The campaign was lengthy, and Maximian spent the winter of 297–298 resting in Carthage before returning to the field. Not content to drive them back into their homelands in the Atlas Mountains – from which they could continue to wage war – Maximian ventured deep into Berber territory. The terrain was unfavorable, and the Berbers were skilled at guerrilla warfare, but Maximian pressed on. Apparently wishing to inflict as much punishment as possible on the tribes, he devastated previously secure land, killed as many as he could, and drove the remainder back into the Sahara. His campaign was concluded by early 298 and, on 10 March, he made a triumphal entry into Carthage. Inscriptions there record the people's gratitude to Maximian, hailing him – as Constantius had been on his entry to London – as redditor lucis aeternae ("restorer of the eternal light"). Maximian returned to Italy in early 299 to celebrate another triumph in Rome.

After his Mauretanian campaign in 299, Maximian returned to the north of Italy, living a life of leisure in palaces in Milan and Aquilea, and leaving warfare to his subordinate Constantius. Maximian was more aggressive in his relationship with the Senate than Constantius, and Lactantius contends that he terrorized senators, to the point of falsely charging and subsequently executing several, including the prefect of Rome in 301–2. In contrast, Constantius kept up good relations with the senatorial aristocracy and spent his time in active defense of the empire. He took up arms against the Franks in 300 or 301 and in 302 – while Maximian was resting in Italy – continued to campaign against Germanic tribes on the Upper Rhine.

According to Aurelius Victor, he also built a palace near his home town of Sirmium. In addition to the imperial palace in Sirmium another palace has been found at Glac, which may be that of Maximian.

== Retirement ==
Diocletian's vicennalia, the 20-year anniversary of his reign, was celebrated in Rome in 303. Some evidence suggests that it was then that Diocletian exacted a promise from Maximian to retire together, passing their titles as Augusti to the Caesars Constantius and Galerius. Presumably Maximian's son Maxentius and Constantius's son Constantine – children raised in Nicomedia together – would then become the new Caesars. While Maximian might not have wished to retire, Diocletian was still in control and there was little resistance. Before retirement, Maximian received one final moment of glory by officiating at the Secular Games in 304.

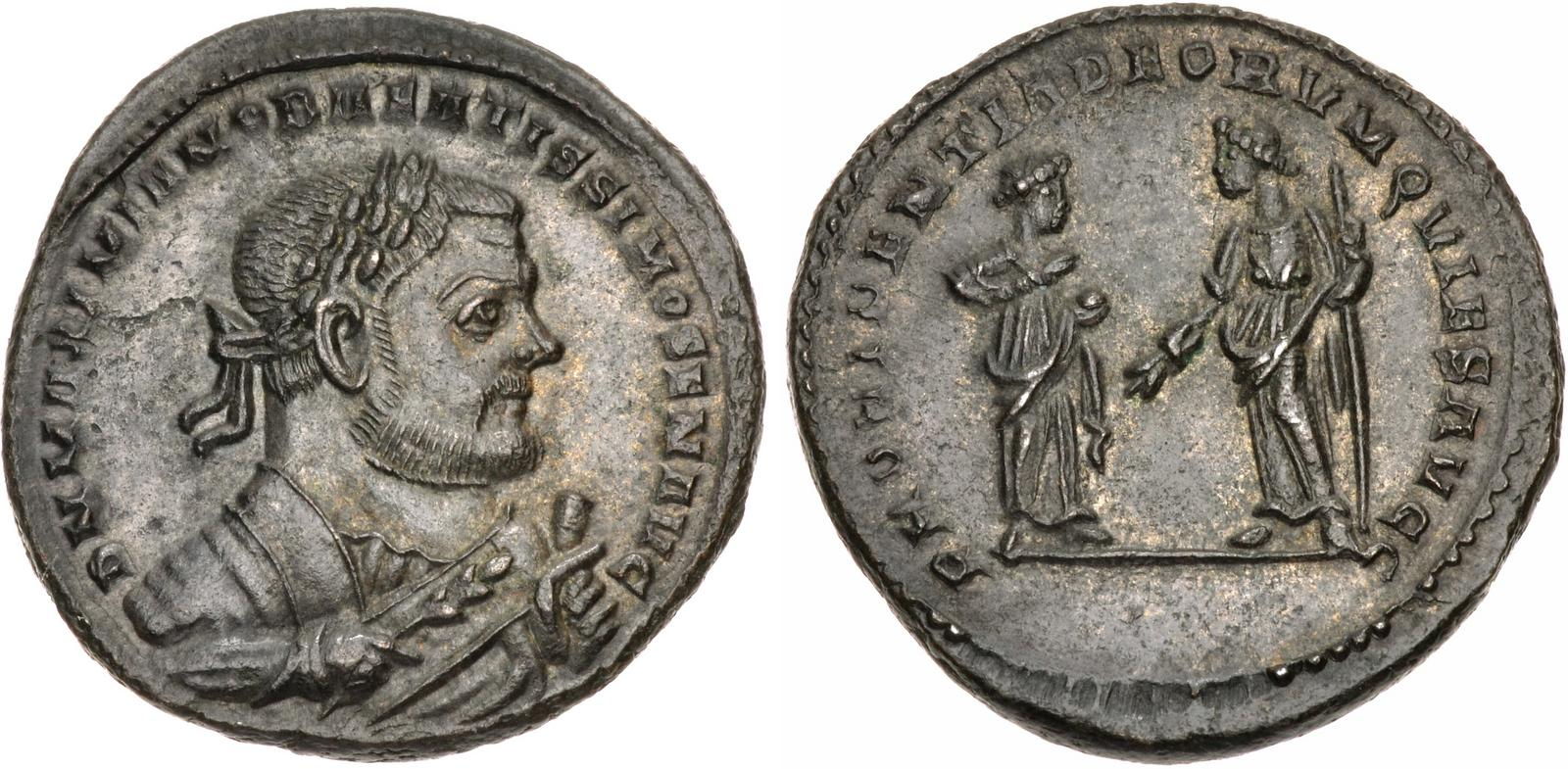
Silvered follis struck in Londinium 305–307 AD commemorating Maximian's abdication. Legend: DN MAXIMIANVS BAEATISSIMO SEN. AVG. / PROVIDENTIA DEORVM QVIES AVGG.

On 1 May 305, in separate ceremonies in Milan and Nicomedia, Diocletian and Maximian retired simultaneously. The succession did not go entirely to Maximian's liking: perhaps because of Galerius' influence, Galerius' former army comrade Severus and Galerius' nephew Maximinus (both of whom had long military careers) were appointed Caesar, thus excluding Constantine and Maxentius. Maximian quickly soured to the new tetrarchy, which saw Galerius assume the dominant position Diocletian once held. Although Maximian led the ceremony that proclaimed Severus as Caesar, within two years he was sufficiently dissatisfied to support his son's rebellion against the new regime. Diocletian retired to the expansive palace he had built in his homeland, Dalmatia near Salona on the Adriatic. Maximian retired to villas in Campania, Lucania or Sirmium, where he lived a life of ease and luxury. Although far from the political centers of the Empire, Diocletian and Maximian remained close enough to stay in regular contact.

== Maxentius' rebellion ==
After the death of Constantius on 25 July 306, Constantine assumed the title of Augustus. This displeased Galerius, who instead offered Constantine the title of Caesar, which Constantine accepted. The title of Augustus then went to Severus. Maxentius was jealous of Constantine's power, and on 28 October 306, he persuaded a cohort of imperial guardsmen to declare him Augustus. Uncomfortable with sole leadership, Maxentius sent a set of imperial robes to Maximian and saluted him as "Augustus for the second time", offering him theoretic equal rule but less actual power and a lower rank.

Galerius refused to recognize Maxentius and sent Severus with an army to Rome to depose him. As many of Severus' soldiers had served under Maximian, and had taken Maxentius' bribes, most of the army defected to Maxentius. Severus fled to Ravenna, which Maximian besieged. The city was strongly fortified so Maximian offered terms, which Severus accepted. Maximian then seized Severus and took him under guard to a public villa in southern Rome, where he was kept as a hostage. In late 307, Galerius led a second force against Maxentius but he again failed to take Rome, and retreated north with his army mostly intact.

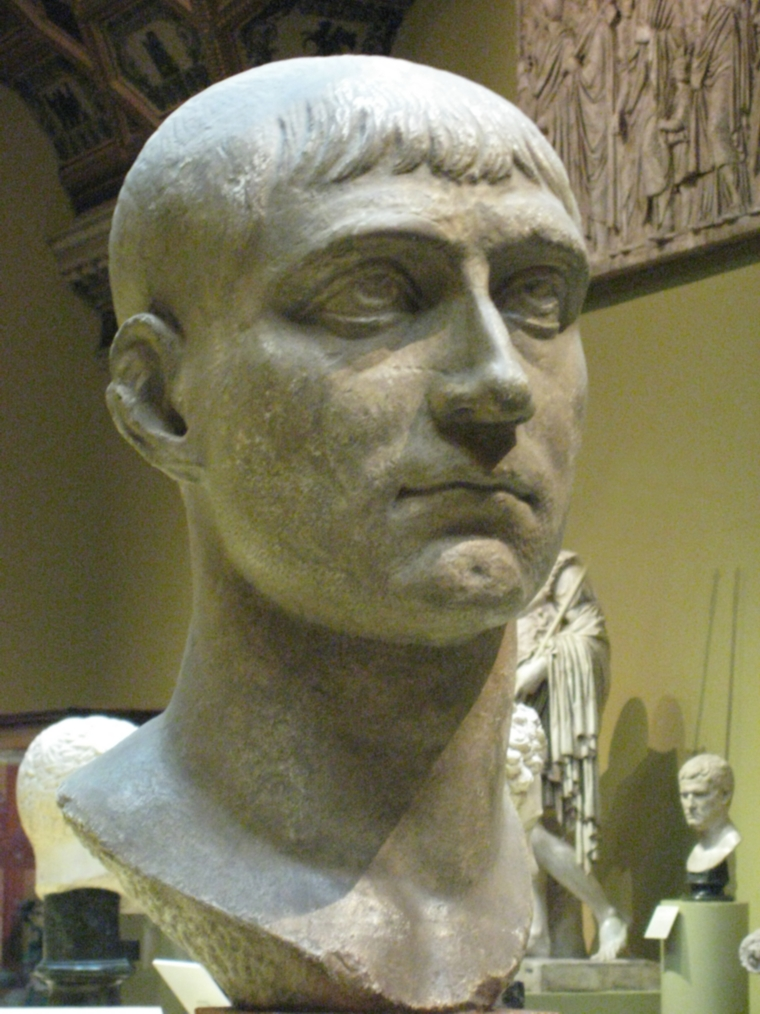
Dresden bust of Maxentius

While Maxentius built up Rome's defenses, Maximian made his way to Gaul to negotiate with Constantine. A deal was struck in which Constantine would marry Maximian's younger daughter Fausta and be elevated to Augustan rank in Maxentius' secessionist regime. In return, Constantine would reaffirm the old family alliance between Maximian and Constantius, and support Maxentius' cause in Italy but would remain neutral in the war with Galerius. The deal was sealed with a double ceremony in Trier in late 307, at which Constantine married Fausta and was declared Augustus by Maximian.

Maximian returned to Rome in the winter of 307–8 but soon fell out with his son and in early 308 challenged his right to rule before an assembly of Roman soldiers. He spoke of Rome's sickly government, disparaged Maxentius for having weakened it, and ripped the imperial toga from Maxentius' shoulders. He expected the soldiers to recognize him, but they sided with Maxentius; afterward, Maximian was forced to leave Italy in disgrace.

On 11 November 308, to resolve the political instability, Galerius called Diocletian (out of retirement) and Maximian to a general council meeting at the military city of Carnuntum on the upper Danube. There, Maximian was forced to abdicate again and Constantine was again demoted to Caesar, with Maximinus the Caesar in the east. Licinius, a loyal military companion to Galerius, was appointed Augustus of the West. In early 309 Maximian returned to the court of Constantine in Gaul, the only court that would still accept him. Constantine and Maximinus refused to be placated with the titles of Sons of the Augusti, and they were both reluctantly recognized as emperors, with the result that there were now four Augusti.

== Rebellion against Constantine ==
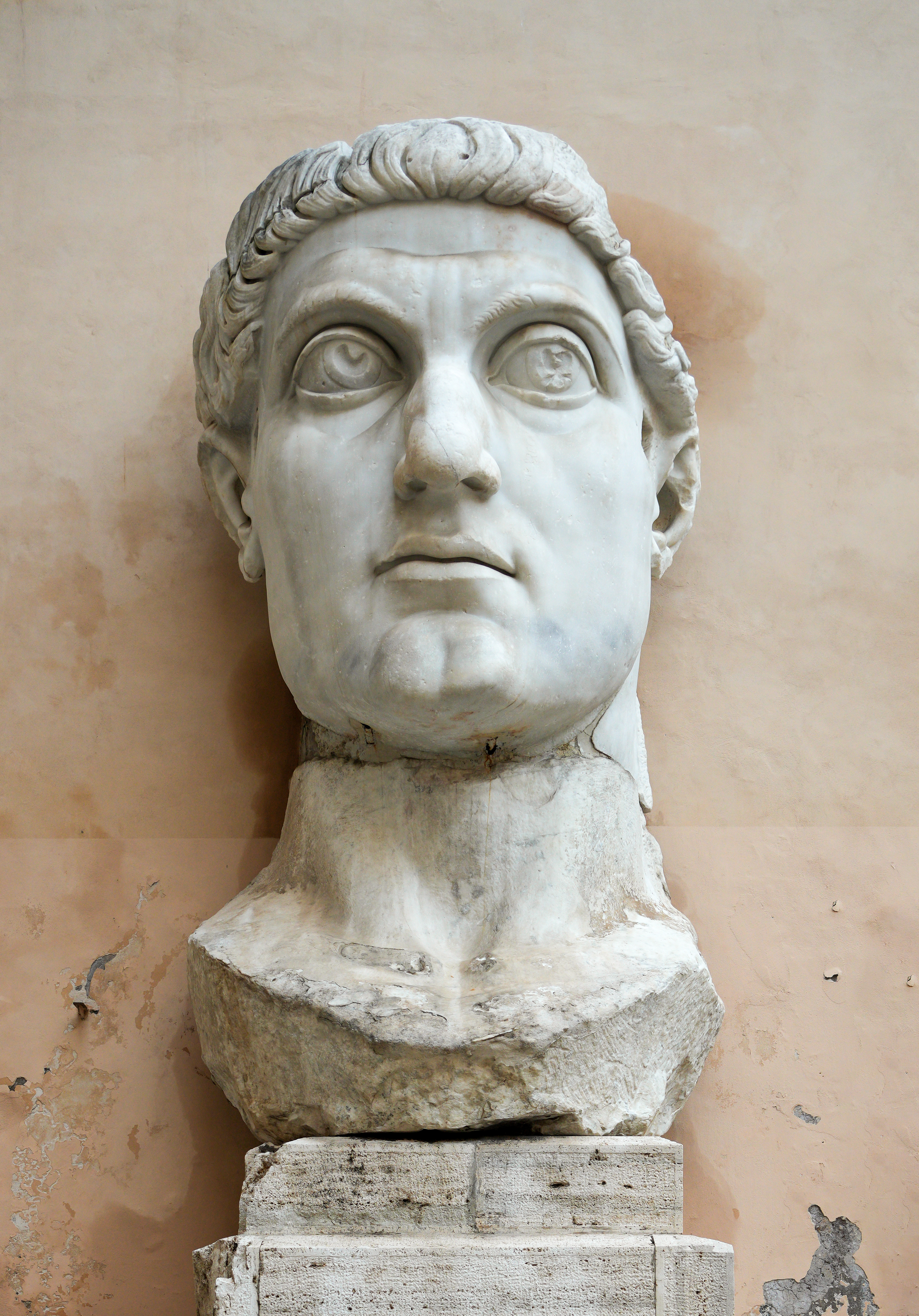
Head of the Colossus of Constantine

In 310, Maximian rebelled against Constantine while the Emperor was on campaign against the Franks. Maximian had been sent south to Arles with part of Constantine's army to defend against attacks by Maxentius in southern Gaul. In Arles, Maximian announced that Constantine was dead and took up the imperial purple. Although Maximian offered bribes to all who would support him, most of Constantine's army remained loyal, and Maximian was compelled to leave the city. Constantine soon heard of the rebellion, abandoned his campaign against the Franks, and moved quickly to southern Gaul, where he confronted the fleeing Maximian at Massilia (Marseille). The town was better able to withstand a long siege than Arles, but it made little difference as loyal citizens opened the rear gates to Constantine. Maximian was captured, reproved for his crimes, and stripped of his title for the third and last time. Constantine granted Maximian some clemency but strongly encouraged his suicide. In July 310, Maximian hanged himself.

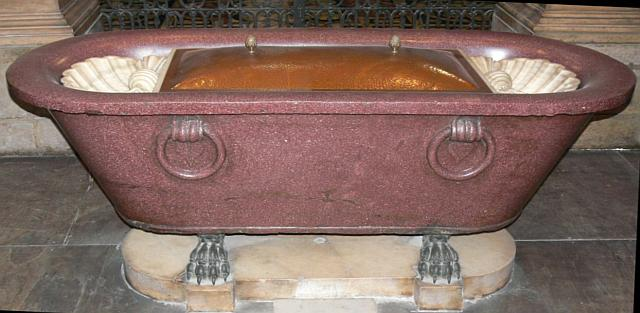
The porphyry sarcophagus of Maximian. It was moved from his mausoleum and is now serving as the baptismal font of the Cathedral of Milan.

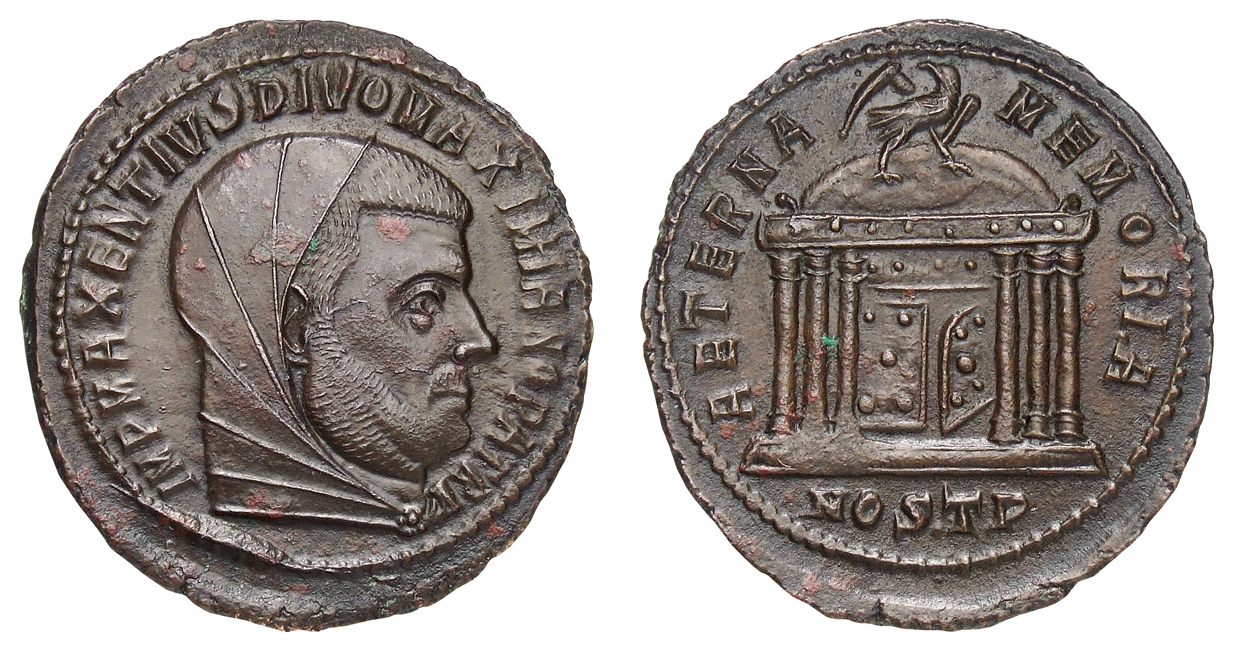
Maximian with veil (capite velato) on a coin issued by Maxentius in 309–312

Despite the earlier rupture in relations, after Maximian's suicide Maxentius presented himself as his father's devoted son. He minted coins bearing his father's deified image and proclaimed his desire to avenge his death.

Constantine initially presented the suicide as an unfortunate family tragedy. By 311, however, he was spreading another version. According to this, after Constantine had pardoned him, Maximian planned to murder Constantine in his sleep. Fausta learned of the plot and warned Constantine, who put a eunuch in his own place in bed. Maximian was apprehended when he killed the eunuch and was offered suicide, which he accepted. In addition to the propaganda, Constantine instituted a damnatio memoriae on Maximian, destroying all inscriptions referring to him and eliminating any public work bearing his image.

Constantine defeated Maxentius at the Battle of the Milvian Bridge on 28 October 312. Maxentius died, and Italy came under Constantine's rule. Eutropia swore on oath that Maxentius was not Maximian's son, and Maximian's memory was rehabilitated. His apotheosis under Maxentius was declared null and void, and he was re-consecrated as a god, probably in 317. He began appearing on Constantine's coinage as divus, or divine, by 318, together with the deified Constantius and Claudius Gothicus The three were hailed as Constantine's forebears. They were called "the best of emperors". Through his daughters Fausta and Theodora, Maximian was grandfather or great-grandfather to every reigning emperor from 337 to 363.

== Family tree ==
Simplified family tree of Tetrarchs

(See also: Chronological scheme of the Tetrarchy, 286–324)

DIOCLETIAN; Iovius; Eastern Emperor; 286–305 | Prisca | Afranius Hannibalianus (disputed) (Note: Timothy Barnes (New Empire, 33–34) questions the parentage of Theodora shown here. He proposes that Maximian is her natural father (and that her mother is possibly a daughter of Afranius Hannibalianus). Substituting Afranicus Hannibalianus and switching the positions of Maximian and Eutropia would produce a diagram that matches the alternative lineage.) consul 292 | Eutropia | Maximian; Herculius; Western Emperor; 286–305
Unknown sister | Galerius; Eastern Emperor; 305-311 | Galeria Valeria | Helena | Constantius I Western Emperor; 305–306; Constantinian Dynasty | Flavia Maximiana Theodora | Severus II; Western Emperor; 306–307
Maximinus II; Eastern Emperor; 310–313 | Valeria Maximilla | Maxentius; Western Emperor; 306–312 | Fausta | Constantine I Roman Emperor; 306–337 | Julius Constantius consul 335 | Flavia Julia Constantia | Licinius I Western then Eastern Emperor; 308–324 | Martinian; Eastern Emperor; 324 | Valens I Eastern Emperor; 316–317
Valerius Romulus | Constantine II; Western Emperor; 337–340 | Constantius II; Emperor; 337–361 | Constans I Middle then Western Emperor; 337–350 | Julian II; Emperor; 361–363 | Licinius II caesar

Notes:

Bibliography:

- Barnes, Timothy D. The New Empire of Diocletian and Constantine. Cambridge, MA: Harvard University Press, 1982. ISBN 0-7837-2221-4

== See also ==
- 20,000 Martyrs of Nicomedia, executed partially during Maximian's reign
- Saints Sergius and Bacchus, officers of Maximian's army who were executed for being Christians
- Saints Demetrius and Nestor were executed by Maximian in Thessaloniki in 306
- Order of Saint Maurice (United States), a series of awards given by the National Infantry Association, named in honor of Roman legionnaires killed by Maximian rather than worship pagan gods.

== Citations ==
Maximian Constantinian dynasty Born: 250 Died: July 310
Regnal titles
| Preceded by Diocletian | Roman emperor 286–305; With: Diocletian | Succeeded by Constantius I and Galerius |
Political offices
| Preceded by M. Junius Maximus; Vettius Aquilinus | Roman consul 287–288 with Diocletian, Pomponius Januarianus | Succeeded by M. Magrius Bassus; L. Ragonius Quintianus |
| Preceded by M. Magrius Bassus; L. Ragonius Quintianus | Roman consul 290 with Diocletian | Succeeded by G. Junius Tiberianus; Cassius Dio |
| Preceded by Afranius Hannibalianus; Julius Asclepiodotus | Roman consul 293 with Diocletian | Succeeded by Constantius I Galerius |
| Preceded by Diocletian; Constantius I | Roman consul 297 with Galerius | Succeeded by Anicius Faustus Paulinus; Virius Gallus |
| Preceded by Anicius Faustus Paulinus; Virius Gallus | Roman consul 299 with Diocletian | Succeeded by Constantius I Galerius |
| Preceded by Constantius I Galerius | Roman consul 303–304 with Diocletian | Succeeded by Constantius I Galerius |
| Preceded by Constantius I Galerius | Roman consul 307 with Constantine I, Severus II, Maximinus II, Galerius | Succeeded by Diocletian, Galerius, Maxentius, Valerius Romulus |
