= Afranius Hannibalianus =

Roman consul 292 AD

Afranius Hannibalianus (fl. 3rd century) was the consul of 292, a praetorian prefect, a senator and a military officer and commander.

== Biography ==
Believed to belong to a family who originated from the eastern provinces of the Roman Empire, Hannibalianus was a military commander who served under the emperor Probus (r. 276–282). A member of the Equestrian order (as noted by the official reference to him as a vir eminentissimus, which was reserved for the equestrian order), he probably was only adlected to the senatorial order after the death of Probus in 282.

He was elevated to the rank of Praetorian prefect of the west in 286 under Maximian, and had led the imperial armies to victory over the Germanic tribes along the Rhine in that year. Hannibalianus held this rank until probably 292, when he was appointed consul prior alongside Julius Asclepiodotus. Then from 297–298, he served as the Praefectus urbi of Rome.

Hannibalianus was possibly married to Eutropia, who divorced him to marry the emperor Maximian in around 280, but this has been contested. If so, they had one daughter, Flavia Maximiana Theodora, who married the future emperor Constantius Chlorus. It has been speculated that Hannibalianus’ acceptance of his wife's new marriage as well as his position as father-in-law to the Caesar Constantius accounted for his rapid rise through the administrative offices of the empire. These theories have been disputed by several historians such as Timothy Barnes, Julia Hillner and John Vanderspoel, with Hillner and Vanderspoel believing that Afranius was Eutropia's brother instead.

== See also ==
- Afrania gens

== Sources ==
- Chastagnol, André, Les Fastes de la Prefecture de Rome au Bas-Empire (1962)
- Martindale, John R.; Jones, A. H. M.; Morris, John, eds. (1971). The Prosopography of the Later Roman Empire: Volume I, AD 260–395. Cambridge: Cambridge University Press. ISBN 0-521-07233-6.

Political offices
Preceded by Gaius Junius Tiberianus II; Cassius Dio	Consul of the Roman Empire; 292 with Julius Asclepiodotus	Succeeded by Diocletian V Maximian IV
