= Historische Zeitschrift =

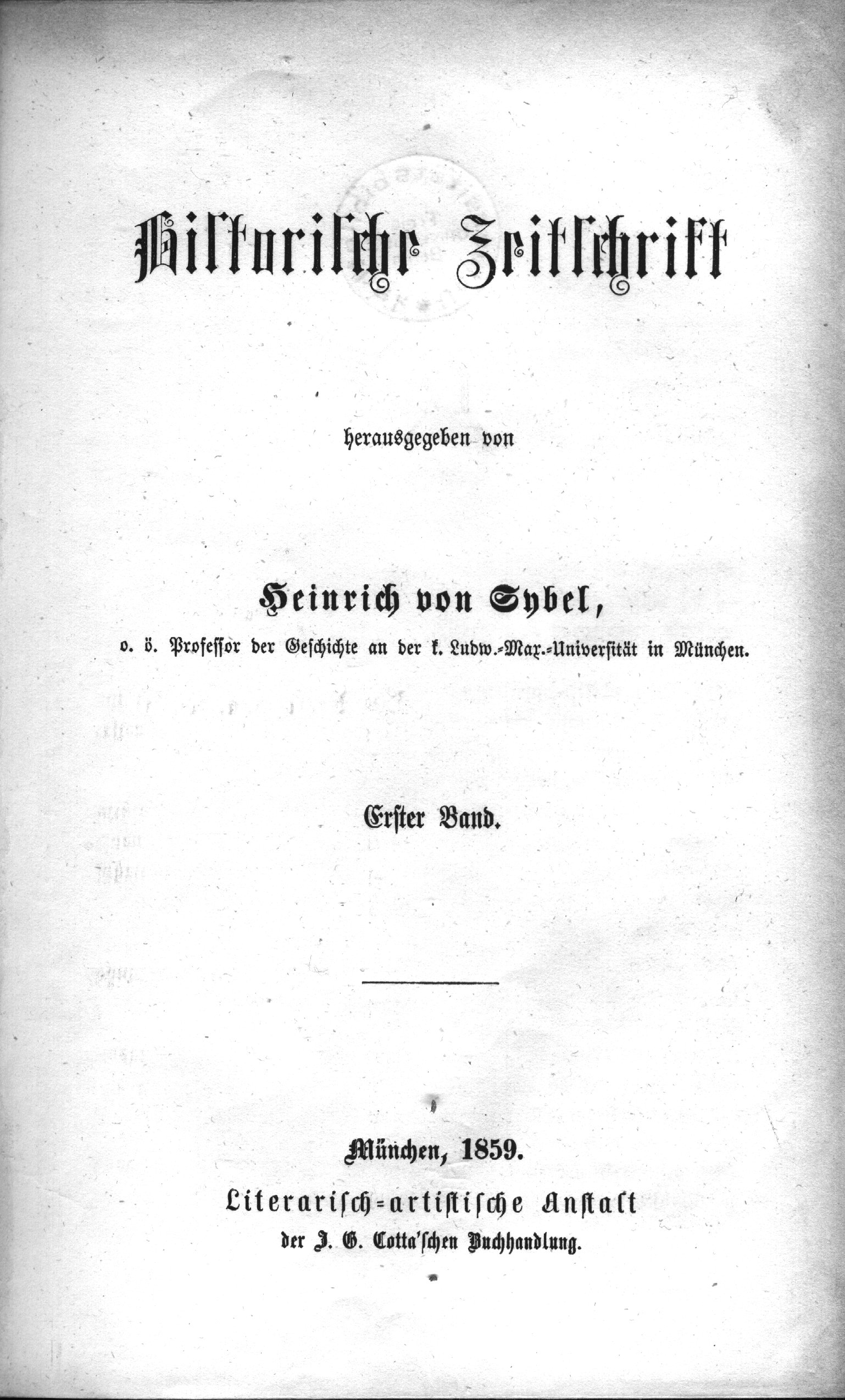
- Discipline: History
- Language: German

Publication details
- Publisher: Oldenbourg Wissenschaftsverlag (Germany)

Standard abbreviations
- ISO 4: Hist. Z.

Indexing
- ISSN: 0018-2613

Historische Zeitschrift, is a German scholarly journal of history and historiography. Founded in 1859 it was the first and for a time the foremost historical journal in Europe. It is published by Akademie Verlag GmbH, a subsidiary of Oldenbourg Wissenschaftsverlag GmbH.

== History ==
The Historische Zeitschrift was founded in 1859 by Heinrich von Sybel. Forerunners of the Historische Zeitschrift as a general journal of scholarly historiography include Leopold von Rankes' Historisch-politische Zeitschrift (1832 to 1836) and particularly Wilhelm Adolf Schmidt's Zeitschrift für Geschichtswissenschaft (1844 to 1848).

In the early phase of its development, until the end of the First World War, the journal was run by and closely associated with Protestant and Prussian historians who championed the Prussian claim to political and cultural hegemony in German-speaking Europe and, since 1871, Prussian political dominance within the German Empire.

Until the Weimar Republic, Catholic authors were rarely represented in the Historische Zeitschrift. During the Kulturkampf, attacks on Catholic perspectives on Central European history were not uncommon, especially in connection with topics concerning the Reformation and the legacy of Martin Luther and the Hohenzollern dynasty. Conversely, Catholic historians published periodicals with some anti-Prussian political and historical content such as the Historisch-politischen Blätter für das katholische Deutschland and the Historisches Jahrbuch. The denominational divide in German historiography and the competition for dominating the discourses about cultural and political identity construction in German-speaking Europe was not overcome until the 1920s when an increasing body of scholarly work by Catholic and Jewish authors was accepted for publication in the Historische Zeitschrift.

During the reign of the National Socialists, the Historische Zeitschrift served "not entirely, but to a large extent, as an instrument for political legitimation" of Hitler's regime and ideology. Until the early 1960s, the scholarship of historians who had emigrated under National Socialism was frequently marginalised or excluded in the journal.

In the late 1960s the journal developed into a diverse and vibrant publication that reflected major trends in West German and Western European historical scholarship. The Historische Zeitschrift became a mirror of intellectual trends and developments at West German universities. Major historical and political controversies in the late Weimar Republic (e.g. about Ernst H. Kantorowicz monograph on emperor Frederick II) and in post-war Germany were debated by leading historians in the Historische Zeitschrift. The main arguments of Fritz Fischer's book Griff nach der Weltmacht about the origins of World War One were first outlined in an article in the Historische Zeitschrift. Major contributors to the 'Historikerstreit' about similarities between Marxist-Leninist and Nationalsocialist totalitarianism and the uniqueness of the Holocaust wrote in the Historische Zeitschrift.

The establishment and development of the Historische Zeitung became a model for other important historical journals in Europe and overseas. This concerns the structure of the journal, the historical epochs it addresses, as well as the inclusion of debates in the area of historiography and the intersection of philosophy and history. The creation of the Historische Zeitschrift inspired the French Revue des questions historiques in 1866 and ten years later Gabriel Monod to found the Revue historique in 1876. In 1886 the English Historical Review was founded, with the American Historical Review following in 1895.

== Structure and significance ==
The Historische Zeitschrift is widely considered to be one of the leading historical journals in German-speaking Europe. Unlike many other journals, the authors of its articles are usually already well established researchers and leading experts in their fields. Since the late 1960s, the journals overall political tendencies have often been described as centre right or liberal.

In addition to essays, particularly on topics of early modern and modern history but also on the history of Greek and Roman Antiquity and the Middle Ages, the Historische Zeitschrift has an extensive review section on new publications in the areas of historical scholarship and historiography. The Historische Zeitschrift frequently includes topics at the intersections of culture and history ('Kulturgeschichte") and art and history ('Kunstgeschichte').

Contributors to the Historische Zeitschrift include a number of famous and groundbreaking scholars, such as the founder Heinrich von Sybel, Nobel laureat (Literature) Theodor Mommsen, Heinrich von Treitschke, Hermann Baumgarten, Friedrich Meinecke, Wilhelm Maurenbrecher, Georg Voigt, Alfred Heuss and Johann Gustav Droysen.

After Heinrich von Sybel (1859-1895), the editors of the historical journal were Heinrich von Treitschke (1895-1896), Friedrich Meinecke (1896-1935), Karl Alexander von Müller (1935-1943), Ludwig Dehio (1949-1956), Walther Kienast (1949-1968), Theodor Schieder (1956-1984), Theodor Schieffer (1968-1975), Lothar Gall (1975-2015), Hartmut Leppin (2015–2023), Andreas Fahrmeir (2015–present), and Julia Hillner (since 2023). The methodological predelictions and writing style of long-serving editors such as Lothar Gall often had an impact on younger scholars. Recent editors such as Fahrmair and Leppin have also liased with major German newspapers such as the Frankfurter Allgemeine Zeitung and Die Zeit in order to democratise the findings and debates of historical scholarship.

On March 3, 2009, the 150th anniversary of the Historische Zeitschrift was celebrated in the Kaulbach Villa of the Historisches Kolleg (Institute for Advanced Study in History) in Munich.

== Editors ==
Historische Zeitschrift's editors have included:

- Heinrich von Sybel (1859–1895)
- Heinrich von Treitschke (1895–1896)
- Friedrich Meinecke (1896–1935)
- Jürgen Müller
- Eckhardt Treichel
- Andreas Fahrmeir
- Hartmut Leppin
- Julia Hillner

== See also ==
- Historiography#Some major historical journals
