= Cassius Dio (consul 291) =

Roman senator and consul in 291

Cassius Dio (/ˈkæʃəs ˈdiːoʊ/; fl. 291–297) was a Roman senator who was appointed consul in AD 291.

== Biography ==
Cassius Dio was either the grandson or great-grandson of his namesake, the historian Cassius Dio, whose family originated in Bithynia. He was appointed consul posterior in 291 alongside Gaius Junius Tiberianus at quite a young age. This was followed by a posting as Proconsular governor of Africa from approximately 1 July 294 to 1 July 295. Then on 18 February 296, he was appointed Praefectus urbi of Rome, a position he held until 297.

Cassius Dio owned a house on the Palatine Hill called the Domus Dionis. At some stage, he and 12 other senators each contributed 400,000 sesterces, probably for the construction of a building.

== Sources ==
- Christol, Michel, Essai sur l'évolution des carrières sénatoriales dans la seconde moitié du IIIe siècle ap. J.C. (1986)
- Martindale, John R.; Jones, A. H. M.; Morris, John, eds. (1971). The Prosopography of the Later Roman Empire: Volume I, AD 260–395. Cambridge: Cambridge University Press. ISBN 0-521-07233-6.

Political offices
Preceded by Diocletian IV; Maximian III	Roman consul 291 with Gaius Junius Tiberianus II	Succeeded by Afranius Hannibalianus; Julius Asclepiodotus
Preceded by T. Claudius Aurelius Aristobulus	Proconsul of Africa; 294–295	Succeeded by T. Flavius Postumius Titianus
Preceded by T. Claudius Aurelius Aristobulus	Urban prefect of Rome; 296–297	Succeeded by Afranius Hannibalianus
