= Gaius Junius Tiberianus =

3rd-century Roman soldier, senator and consul

Gaius Junius Tiberianus (born c. AD 230) was a Roman soldier and senator who was appointed consul twice, first around AD 265, and then in AD 291.

== Biography ==
According to the notoriously unreliable Historia Augusta, Tiberianus was related in some way to the emperor Aurelian. In AD 249, Tiberianus was a Military tribune attached to the Legio X Gemina, stationed at Vindobona in the province of Pannonia Superior.

It is believed that Tiberianus was made consul designate around the year AD 265. This was followed by a second consulship in AD 291, when he was consul prior alongside Cassius Dio, implying he had a long and distinguished career.

Tiberianus also served as praefectus urbi of Rome from February 18, 291 to August 3, 292. The Historia Augusta relates an incident where the supposed writer of Aurelian's biography had a discussion with Tiberianus, which has been traditionally dated to during his term as Urban Prefect:

Junius Tiberianus, the prefect of the city, an illustrious man and one to be named only with a prefix of deep respect, took me up into his carriage, that is to say, his official coach. There his mind being now at leisure, relaxed and freed from law-pleas and public business, he engaged in much conversation all the way from the Palatine Hill to the Gardens of Varius, his theme being chiefly the lives of the emperors. And when we had reached the Temple of the Sun, consecrated by the Emperor Aurelian, he asked me who had written down the record of the life of that prince. When I replied that I had read none in Latin, though several in Greek, that revered man poured forth in the following words the sorrow that his groan implied: "Shall the Deified Aurelian, that most famous of princes, that most firm of rulers, who restored the whole world to the sway of Rome, be unknown to posterity? God prevent such madness! And yet, if I am not mistaken, we possess the written journal of that great man and also his wars recorded in detail in the manner of a history, and these I should like you to procure and set forth in order, adding thereto all that pertains to his life. All these things you may learn in your zeal for research from the linen books, for he gave instructions that in these all that he did each day should be written down. I will arrange, moreover, that the Ulpian Library shall provide you with the linen books themselves. It would be my wish that you write a work on Aurelian, representing him, to the best of your ability, just as he really was."

At some point after his tenure as Urban Prefect, it is speculated that he was exiled on decree of the Roman Senate. It is also postulated that Tiberianus had two sons, Junius Tiberianus and Publilius Optatianus.

== Sources ==
- Christol, Michel, Essai sur l'évolution des carrières sénatoriales dans la seconde moitié du IIIe siècle ap. J.C. (1986)
- Martindale, John R.; Jones, A. H. M.; Morris, John, eds. (1971). The Prosopography of the Later Roman Empire: Volume I, AD 260–395. Cambridge: Cambridge University Press. ISBN 0-521-07233-6.

Political offices
Preceded by Diocletian IV; Maximian III	Roman consul 291 with Cassius Dio	Succeeded by Afranius Hannibalianus; Julius Asclepiodotus
