= Julius Asclepiodotus =

Late 3rd-century Roman politician

Julius Asclepiodotus was a Roman praetorian prefect who, according to the Historia Augusta, served under the emperors Aurelian, Probus and Diocletian, and was consul in 292. In 296, he assisted the western Caesar Constantius Chlorus in re-establishing Roman rule in Britain, following the illegal rules of Carausius and Allectus.

== Historical life ==
Allectus, having assassinated Carausius in 293, remained in control of Britain until 296, when Constantius staged an invasion to retake the island. While Constantius sailed from Boulogne, Asclepiodotus took a section of the fleet and the legions from San Dun Sandouville and the oppidum near Le Havre, slipping past Allectus's fleet at the Isle of Wight under cover of fog, and landed presumably in the vicinity of Southampton or Chichester, where he burned his ships. Allectus attempted to retreat from the coast, but was cut off by Constantius's forces and defeated. Some of Constantius's troops, who had been separated from the main body by the fog during the channel crossing, caught up with the remnants of Allectus's men at London and massacred them.

He may be the same Asclepiodotus as the one who wrote a biography of Diocletian.

== In legend ==
Asclepiodotus appears in medieval British legend as a native king of Britain. Geoffrey of Monmouth's History of the Kings of Britain (1136) portrays him as a duke of Cornwall who is raised to the kingship in opposition to Allectus, a Roman who oppressed the people of Britain. He defeats and kills Allectus near London, and besieges the rest of his forces in the city. The Romans eventually surrender on condition of safe conduct out of Britain, which Asclepiodotus is willing to grant, but his allies the Venedoti attack them and cut off their heads, which are thrown into the river Gallobroc. Asclepiodotus is then officially crowned king, and rules justly for ten years. However, his rule is contemporary with the persecutions of Christians under Diocletian, and Geoffrey places the martyrdom of Saint Alban at this time. In response to these atrocities, Coel, duke of Colchester, leads a revolt against him, kills him, and takes his crown.

Political offices
Preceded by Gaius Junius Tiberianus II, Cassius Dio	Consul of the Roman Empire; 292 with Afranius Hannibalianus	Succeeded by Diocletian, Maximian
Legendary titles
Unknown Last known title holder: Tenvantius	Duke of Cornwall	Unknown Next known title holder: Caradocus
Preceded by Allectus	King of Britain	Succeeded by Coel
