= Julia Hillner =

German historian

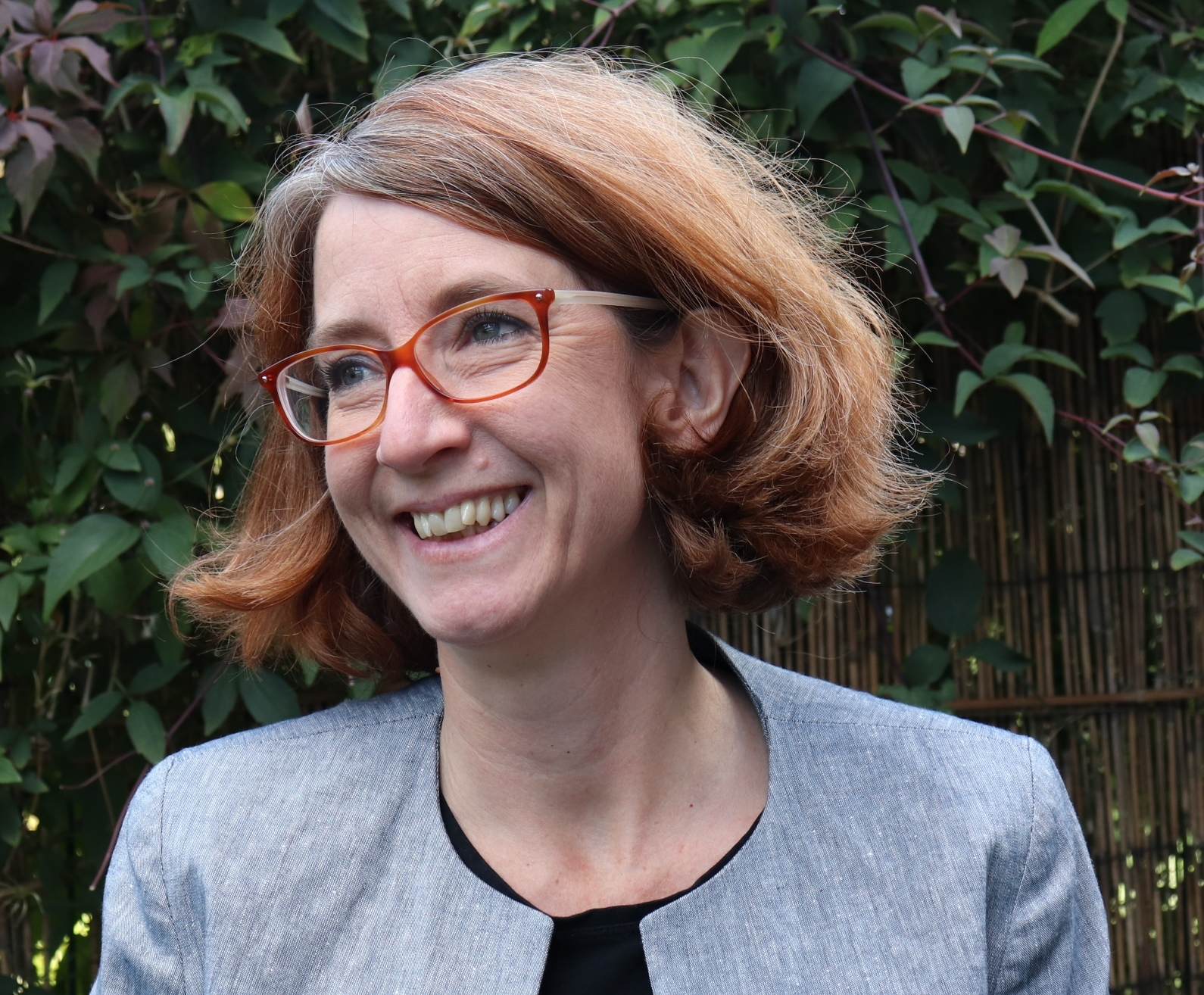

Academic background
- Education: University of Bonn; University of Perugia; University of Padova

Academic work
- Discipline: Classics, Late antiquity
- Institutions: University of Sheffield

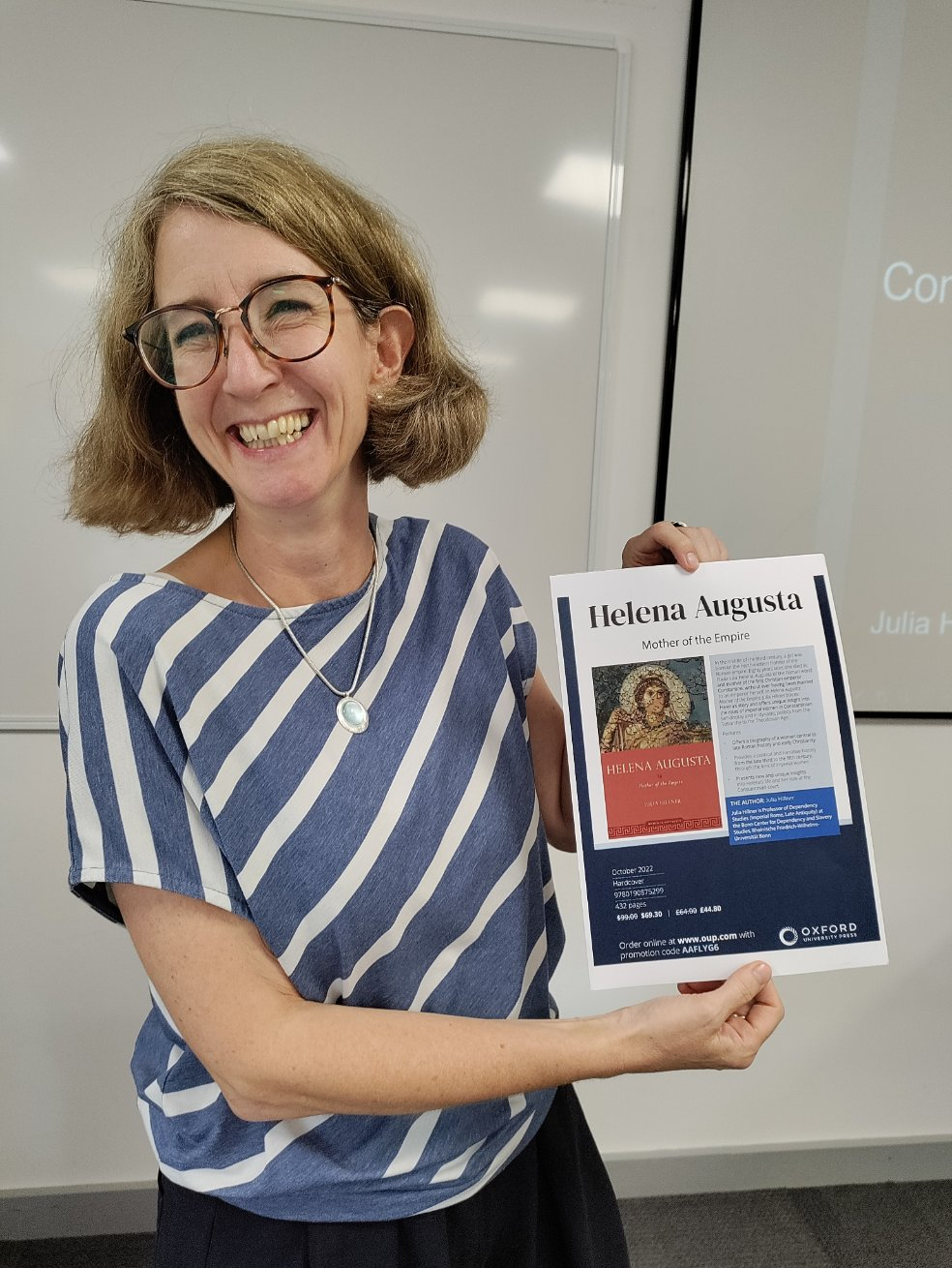
Hillner with her forthcoming book, September 2022

Julia Hillner is Professor for Dependency and Slavery Studies at the University of Bonn. She was previously Professor of Medieval History at the University of Sheffield. She is an expert on late antiquity, applying digital methods of social network analysis to large data sets drawn from a wide variety of late antique and early medieval sources.

== Career ==
Hillner studied for her Staatsexamen and PhD at the University of Bonn. She completed her PhD in 2001, which included a one-year visiting doctoral fellowship at the University of Padova (1997–8). Her revised doctoral thesis was published in 2004 as Jedes Haus ist eine Stadt : Privatimmobilien im spätantiken Rom.

From 1999 Hillner worked on the Arts and Humanities Research Council project Religion, Dynasty and Patronage in Rome, c. 440–840 at the University of Manchester. She became a teaching fellow in Early Christianity and was a British Academy Postdoctoral Fellow from 2003 to 2008 working on Imprisonment in Late Antiquity: Christian Memory and Social Reality. Hillner moved to the University of Sheffield in 2008.

Hillner's work on imprisonment in late antiquity resulted in her publication Prison, Punishment and Penance in Late Antiquity (Cambridge University Press, 2015). The book was described as 'a wonderful contribution to the field', and it won an Honorable Mention at the 2016 PROSE Awards.

From 2014 to 2017 Hillner was the Principal Investigator of The Migration of Faith: Clerical Exile in Late Antiquity, an Arts and Humanities Research Council funded project in collaboration with the Digital Humanities Institute at the University of Sheffield, the Faculty of Theology at the University of Halle, the Department of Culture and Society at Aarhus University, the Abteilung Byzanzforschung at the Austrian Academy of Sciences, and the German Historical Institute in London. This project examined the banishment of Christian clerics across the Mediterranean during the religious controversies of late antiquity and how this shaped the institution of the Christian church. It constructed an online prosopographical database of exiled clerics from a wide variety of source material including contemporary epigraphy, histories, hagiography, and letters. The project also resulted in the publication of a number of books and articles on the subject, including an edited volume Clerical Exile in Late Antiquity, the publication of the XVII International Conference on Patristic Studies held at the University of Oxford in 2015.

In 2018, Hillner started a new project funded by the Leverhulme Trust on Women, Conflict and Peace: Gendered Networks in Early Medieval Narratives (c. 330–735). The project ran from 2018 to 2020 and focused on how women and their networks fitted into the narrative of conflict and peace during the turbulent period of the 4th to 8th centuries. Hillner's work again used digital methods of network analysis to focus on the social roles of women rather than studying individuals, using material from a wide variety of late antique and early medieval sources.

In 2022, Hillner published a biography of Helena, mother of the emperor Constantine for the Women in Antiquity series. The book examines Helena in the context of a network of female contacts and the social parameters of late antique women. Hillner writes a blog dedicated to the subject of Helena and her life called Writing Helena.

Hillner was a Director of the Medieval and Ancient Research Centre at the University of Sheffield (MARCUS) and member of the Faculty of Archaeology, History and Letters of the British School at Rome (2017–2021). She is a member of the editorial board for the Journal of Roman Studies., and was in 2023 appointed as editor-in-chief of the world's oldest academic History journal, the Historische Zeitschrift, becoming the first woman to hold this role.

In October 2021, she took up her current position at the University of Bonn, appointed with other female scholars Claudia Jarzebowski and Pia Wiegmink, as well as Christoph Witzenrath. She will be researching jewels, slavery and women.

Hillner's doctoral students have included Harry Mawdsley, Assistant Professor in Early Medieval History at Durham University.

== Selected publications ==
- Helena Augusta: Mother of the Empire. Oxford, Oxford University Press. 2022.
- 'Empresses, Queens, and Letters: Finding a ‘Female Voice’ in Late Antiquity?', Gender & History, vol. 31, issue 2 (2019), 353–382 (open access here: https://onlinelibrary.wiley.com/doi/full/10.1111/1468-0424.12427)
- 'Domus, Family, and Inheritance: the Senatorial Family House in Late Antique Rome.' Journal of Roman Studies 93 (2003): 129–45.
- Jedes Haus ist eine Stadt: Privatimmobilien im spätantiken Rom. Bonn, R. Habelt. 2004.
- 'Clerics, property and patronage: the case of the Roman titular churches.' Antiquité Tardive 14 (2006): 59–68.
- ed. with Kate Cooper. Religion, Dynasty, and Patronage in Early Christian Rome, 300-900. Cambridge, Cambridge University Press. 2007.
- 'Monastic Imprisonment in Justinian's Novels.' Journal of Early Christian Studies 15, no. 2 (2007): 205–237.
- 'Monks and children: corporal punishment in Late Antiquity', European Review of History: Revue européenne d'histoire, 16:6 (2009): 773–791.
- Prison, Punishment, and Penance in Late Antiquity. Cambridge, Cambridge University Press. 2015
- ed. with Jörg Ulrich and Jakob Engberg. Clerical Exile in Late Antiquity. Peter Lang, Frankfurt. 2016.

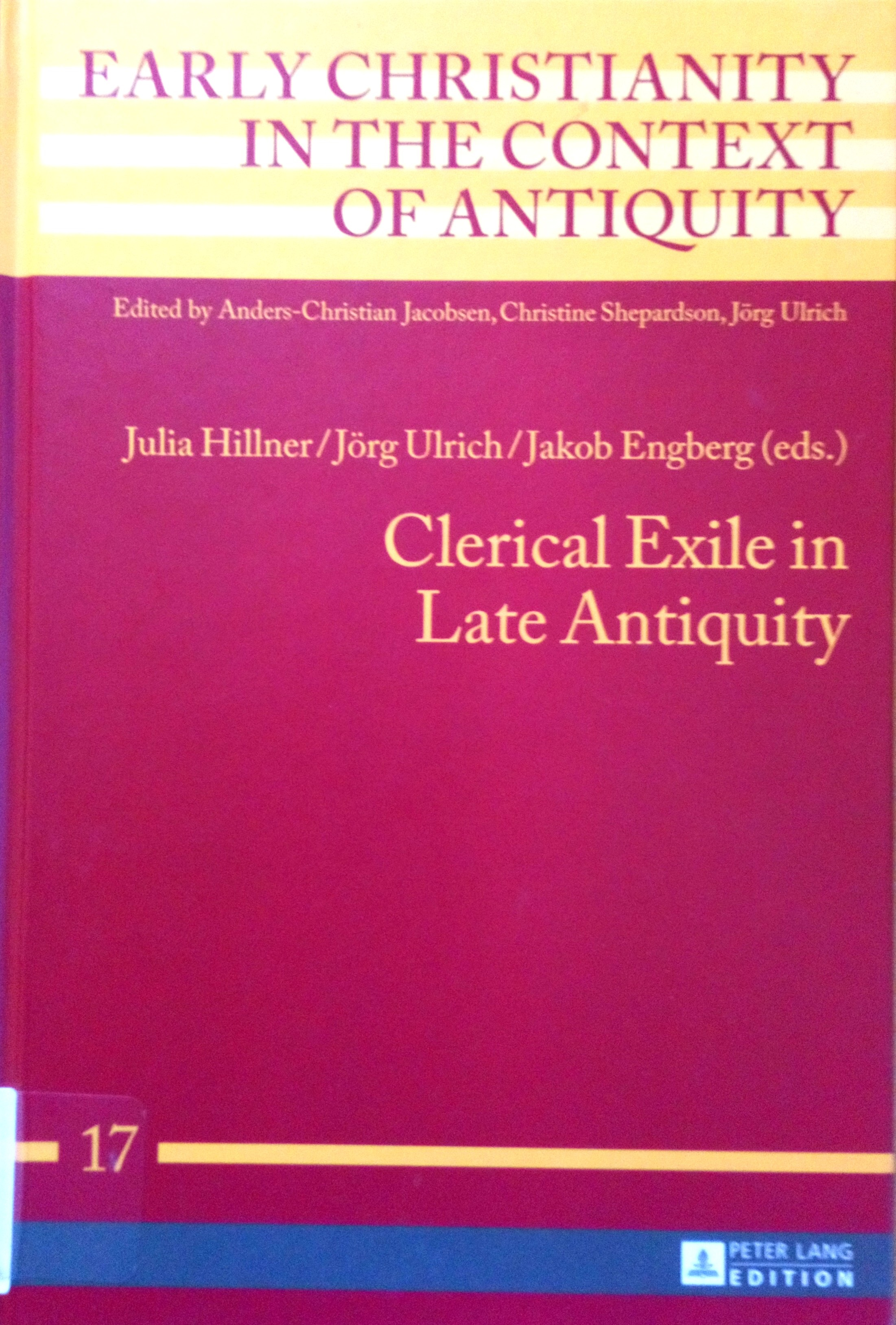
Front cover image of Clerical Exile in Late Antiquity - Julia Hillner, Jörg Ulrich, Jakob Engberg
