= Allegory of Abundance =

Drawing by Sandro Botticelli

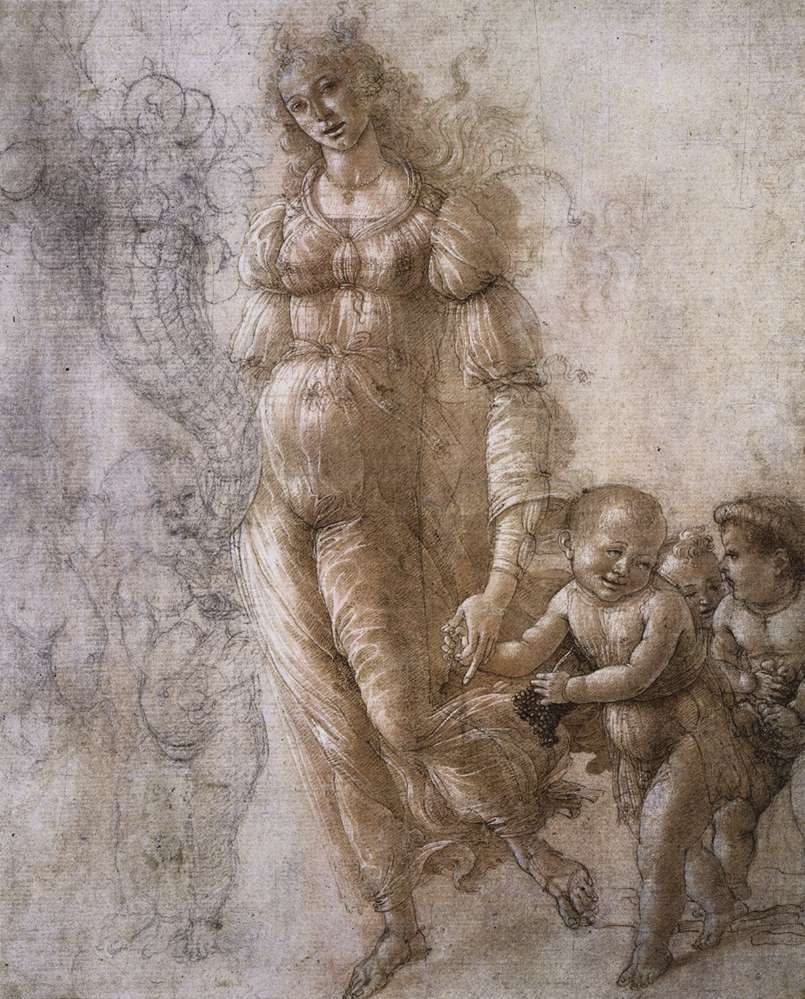
- Artist: Sandro Botticelli
- Year: c. 1480–1485
- Type: Pen and brown ink, with brown wash
- Dimensions: 31.7 cm × 25.2 cm (12.5 in × 9.9 in)
- Location: British Museum, London

The Allegory of Abundance is a pen drawing on paper by Sandro Botticelli in the British Museum, London. It is considered one of the most beautiful of about 30 drawings that survive from Botticelli's hand.

== Description ==
The drawing was executed by Sandro Botticelli in pen and then shaded in pen and brown ink with brown wash, heightened with white, while the orange-red background consists mainly of red lead. The work is unfinished, as the cornucopia symbolizing abundance and the putti to the left of the goddess have remained in charcoal. The goddess of Abundance moves with a soft dance step to the left and the movement makes her hair flutter. She holds a smiling cherub by the hand who runs next to her, the latter carrying a bunch of grapes. A second putto holds a cornucopia in his hands, and of a third only the head can be seen.

== Importance ==
The art historian Bernard Berenson considered this drawing – which dates from the same time period as the frescoes of Villa Lemmi (now in the Louvre) – among the great masterpieces of Sandro Botticelli, such as the famous paintings of Primavera and the Birth of Venus. Berenson described the female figure traced in this drawing as follows: "The soft textures of her dress lap her slender and firm body, and adhering to reveal her forms as if she were naked, and accentuate her movement with their flourishes that the breeze, hitting her limbs, pushes in the opposite direction." When one is faced with such masterpieces, Berenson adds, one only has to "court the soul of beauty".

== Bibliography ==
- Botticelli Drawings, Rinaldi, Furio, ISBN 9780300272031 Published by Yale University Press (edition ), 2023
- The Drawings of the Florentine Painters by Bernard Berenson, 3 volumes
