= 151 Abundantia =

Main-belt asteroid

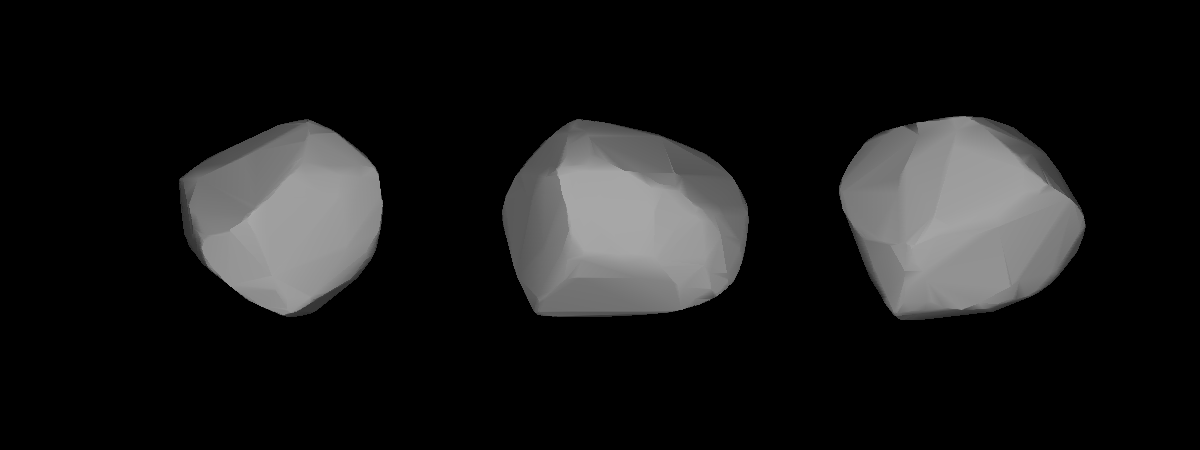
- Lightcurve based 3D model of 151 Abundantia

Discovery
- Discovered by: J. Palisa
- Discovery site: Austrian Naval Obs.
- Discovery date: 1 November 1875

Designations
- Pronunciation: /æbənˈdænʃiə/
- Named after: Abundantia
- Alternative designations: A875 VA; 1974 QS_{2}, 1974 QZ_{2}
- Minor planet category: Main belt

Orbital characteristics
- Epoch 31 July 2016 (JD 2457600.5)
- Uncertainty parameter 0
- Observation arc: 131.24 yr (47936 d)
- Aphelion: 2.6792 AU (400.80 Gm)
- Perihelion: 2.5049 AU (374.73 Gm)
- Semi-major axis: 2.5921 AU (387.77 Gm)
- Eccentricity: 0.033623
- Orbital period (sidereal): 4.17 yr (1524.3 d)
- Mean anomaly: 141.90°
- Mean motion: 0° 14^{m} 10.212^{s} / day
- Inclination: 6.4348°
- Longitude of ascending node: 38.872°
- Argument of perihelion: 130.92°

Physical characteristics
- Dimensions: 45.37±0.9 km
- Synodic rotation period: 9.864 h (0.4110 d)
- Geometric albedo: 0.1728±0.007; 0.173
- Spectral type: S
- Absolute magnitude (H): 9.1

151 Abundantia is a stony main belt asteroid. It was discovered by Johann Palisa on 1 November 1875, from the Austrian Naval Observatory in Pula. The name was chosen by Edmund Weiss of the Vienna Observatory; although the name refers to Abundantia, a Roman goddess of luck, it was also chosen to celebrate the increasing numbers of asteroids that were being discovered in the 1870s.

Information from A. Harris as of 1 March 2001 indicates that 151 Abundantia is an S class (stony) asteroid with a diameter of 45.37 km and H = 9.24 .1728 and albedo of 0.03. The light curve collected over 6 nights from 2/16/2002 to 3/10/2002 confirmed the rotational period to be 19.718h.

Data from 2001 shows a diameter of 45.37 km. An occultation by the asteroid was observed on 10 December 2017, showing the asteroid to be highly elongated, with dimensions of roughly 24 x 52 km.
