= Annona (mythology) =

Personification of the Roman grain supply

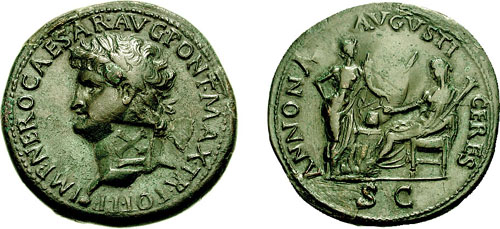
On the reverse of this sestertius of Nero, Annona (standing right) holds a cornucopia, facing Ceres (seated left) holding grain-ears and torch, with a modius on the garlanded altar between them and a ship's stern behind

In ancient Roman religion, Annona (Latin annōna “corn, grain; means of subsistence”, from annus "year") is the divine personification of the grain supply to the city of Rome. She is closely connected to the goddess Ceres, with whom she is often depicted in art.

Annona, often as Annona Augusti, was a creation of Imperial religious propaganda, manifested in iconography and cult practice. She is presented as a theophany of the emperor's power to care for his people through the provision of grain. Annona thus lacked narrative mythology or a tradition of devotion in the Roman Republic, but once established as part of Imperial cult, she was the recipient of dedications and votive offerings from private individuals motivated by gratitude or the seeking of favor.

== Imperial cult ==
In the propaganda of Claudius, the cult of Ceres Augusta made explicit the divine power that lay in the Imperial provision of the annona, the grain supply to the city. Annona Augusti appears on coins late in the reign of Nero, when the Cult of Virtues came into prominence in the wake of the Pisonian conspiracy. She embodied two of the material benefits of Imperial rule, along with Securitas Augusti, "Augustan Security," and often appeared as part of a pair with Ceres. On Neronian coinage, Ceres, Annona, and Abundantia ("Abundance") were closely associated.

Annona also appears on coins issued under Vespasian, where along with other Virtues she represents the restoration of confidence in the principate, and on the coinage of Titus, Domitian, Trajan, Hadrian, Antoninus Pius, and Septimius Severus. She was a particular favorite in Trajan's propaganda, which sought to portray his reign as a renewal and a prosperous new era for humanity; hence Annona often appears with a symbolic child. In the context of Trajanic politics, Annona represented Rome's grain independence from its traditional supplier Egypt.

== Iconography ==
Annona is typically depicted with a cornucopia (horn of plenty) in her arm, and a ship's prow in the background, alluding to the transport of grain into the harbor of Rome. On coins, she frequently stands between a modius (grain-measure) and the prow of a galley, with ears of grain in one hand and a cornucopia in the other; sometimes she holds a rudder or an anchor.

== Namesake ==
The crater Annona in the southern hemisphere of the dwarf planet Ceres was named after this deity.

== See also ==
- Cura Annonae
