= Cornucopia =

Mythological symbol of abundance, also called the horn of plenty

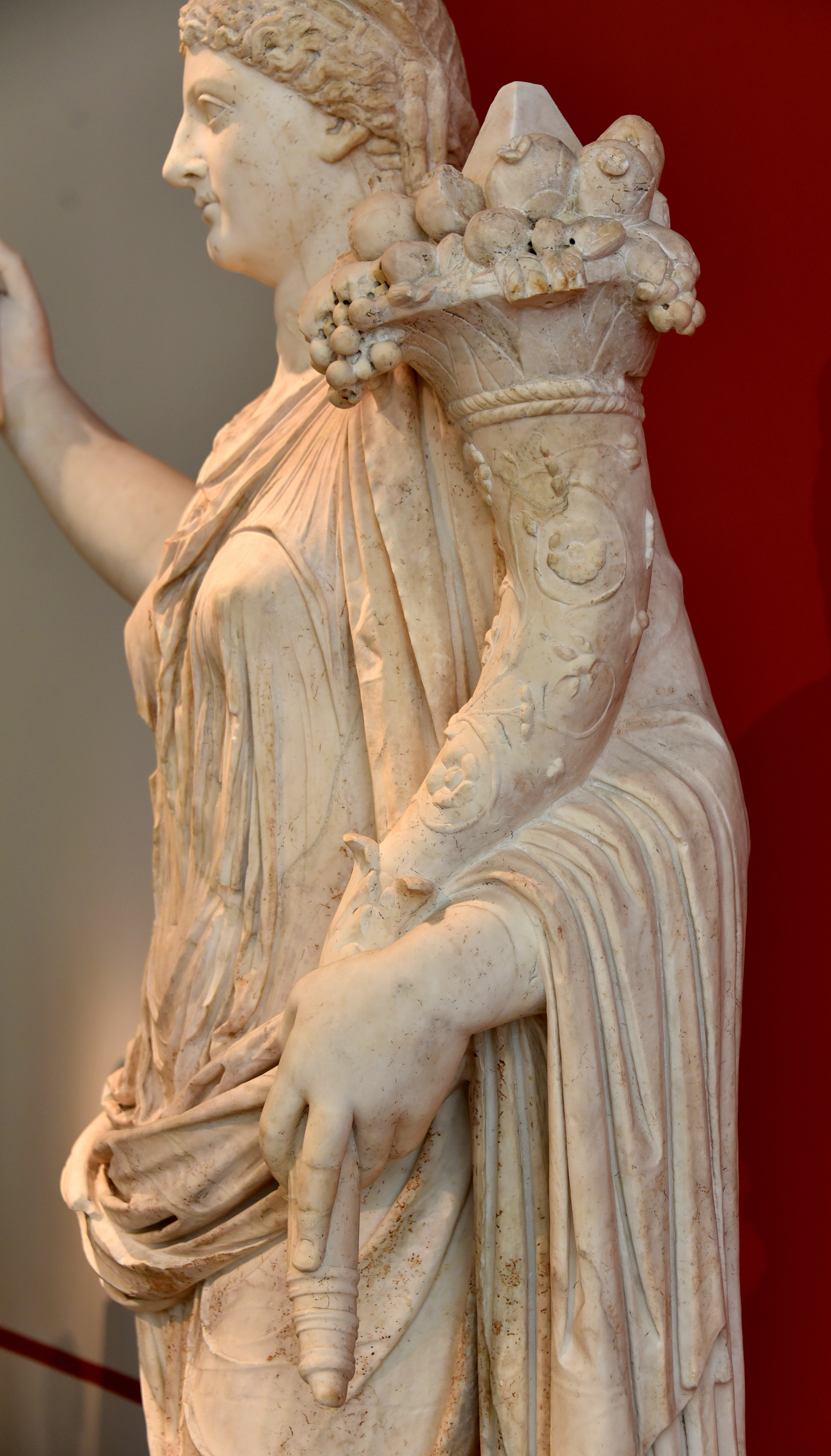
Cornucopia of a Roman statue of Livia as Fortuna, 42-52 AD, marble, Altes Museum, Berlin

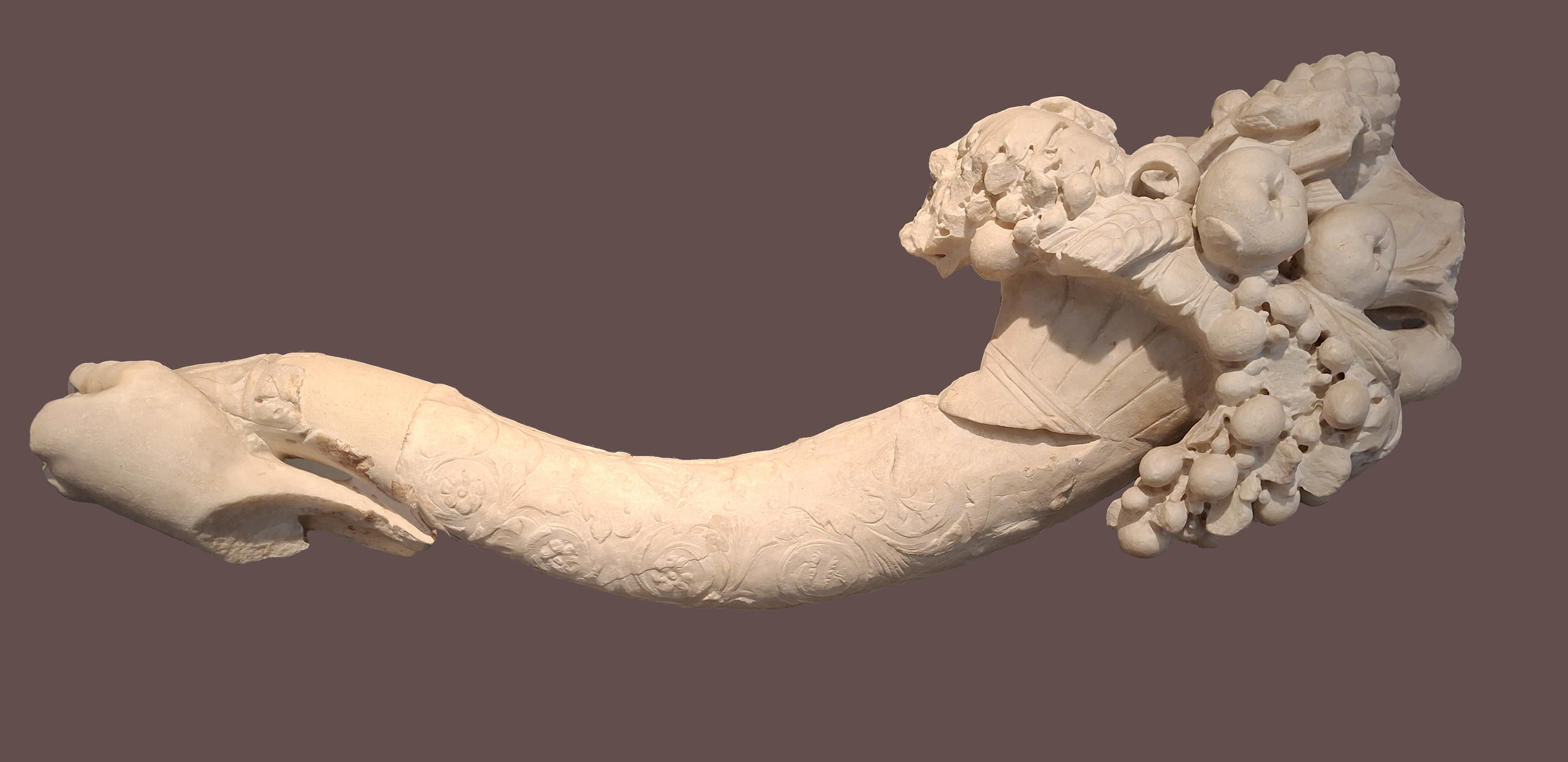
Cornucopia, part of a Roman statue, Archaeological Museum A. Salinas, Palermo, Sicily, Italy

In classical antiquity, the cornucopia (/ˌkɔːrn(j)əˈkoʊpiə, -n(j)uː-/; from Latin cornu 'horn' and copia 'abundance'), also called the horn of plenty, is a symbol of abundance and nourishment, commonly a large horn-shaped container overflowing with produce, flowers, or nuts. In Greek, it was called the horn of Amalthea (Ancient Greek: κέρας Ἀμαλθείας, romanized: kéras Amaltheías), after Amalthea, a nurse of Zeus, who is often part of stories of the horn's origin.

Baskets or panniers of this form were traditionally used in western Asia and Europe to hold and carry newly harvested food products. The horn-shaped basket would be worn on the back or slung around the torso, leaving the harvester's hands free for picking.

== In classical mythology ==
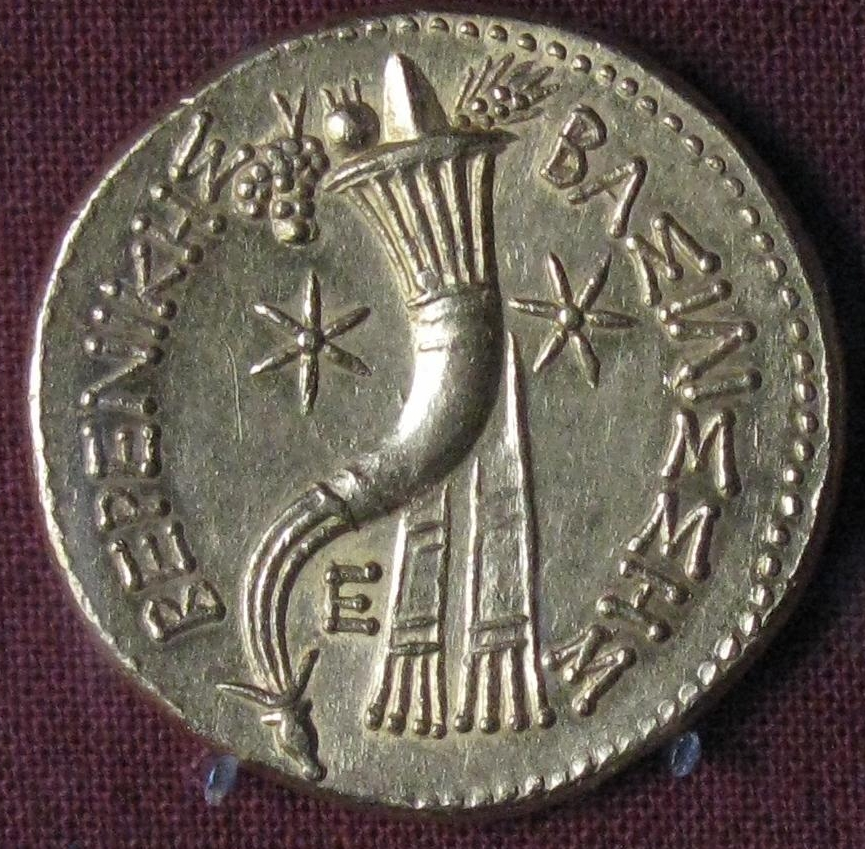
Cornucopia at the center of a coin of Berenice II of Egypt; the Greek inscription reads ΒΑΣΙΛΙΣΣΗΣ ΒΕΡΕΝΙΚΗΣ, "of Queen Berenice".

Mythology offers multiple explanations of the origin of the cornucopia. One of the best-known involves the birth and nurturance of the infant Zeus, who had to be hidden from his devouring father Cronus. In a cave on Mount Ida on the island of Crete, baby Zeus was cared for and protected by a number of divine attendants, including the goat Amalthea ("Nourishing Goddess"), who fed him with her milk. The suckling future king of the gods had unusual abilities and strength, and in playing with his nursemaid accidentally broke off one of her horns, which then had the divine power to provide unending nourishment, as the foster mother had to the god.

In another myth, the cornucopia was created when Heracles (Roman Hercules) wrestled with the river god Achelous and ripped off one of his horns; river gods were sometimes depicted as horned. This version is represented in the Achelous and Hercules mural painting by the American Regionalist artist Thomas Hart Benton.

The cornucopia became the attribute of several Greek and Roman deities, particularly those associated with the harvest, prosperity, or spiritual abundance, such as personifications of Earth (Gaia or Terra); the child Plutus, god of riches and son of the grain goddess Demeter; the nymph Maia; and Fortuna, the goddess of luck, who had the power to grant prosperity. In Roman Imperial cult, abstract Roman deities who fostered peace (pax Romana) and prosperity were also depicted with a cornucopia, including Abundantia, "Abundance" personified, and Annona, goddess of the grain supply to the city of Rome. Hades, the classical ruler of the underworld in the mystery religions, was a giver of agricultural, mineral and spiritual wealth, and in art often holds a cornucopia.

== Bible ==
The Septuagint (dated to around the 2nd century BC) version of the Book of Job gives the name of the youngest daughter of Job, Keren-happuch, as Amaltheías Kéras (Ἀμαλθείας Κέρας, 'horn of Amalthea'), a name the Roman author Pliny the Elder explicitly identifies with the cornucopia. In the 4th century AD, the Christian bishop Gregory of Nyssa writes that the text's usage of this term should not be taken as reason to believe in the mythical Greek tale of Amalthea, but that it is the text's way of emphasising the virtuous character and beautiful appearance of Job's daughter.

== Modern depictions ==
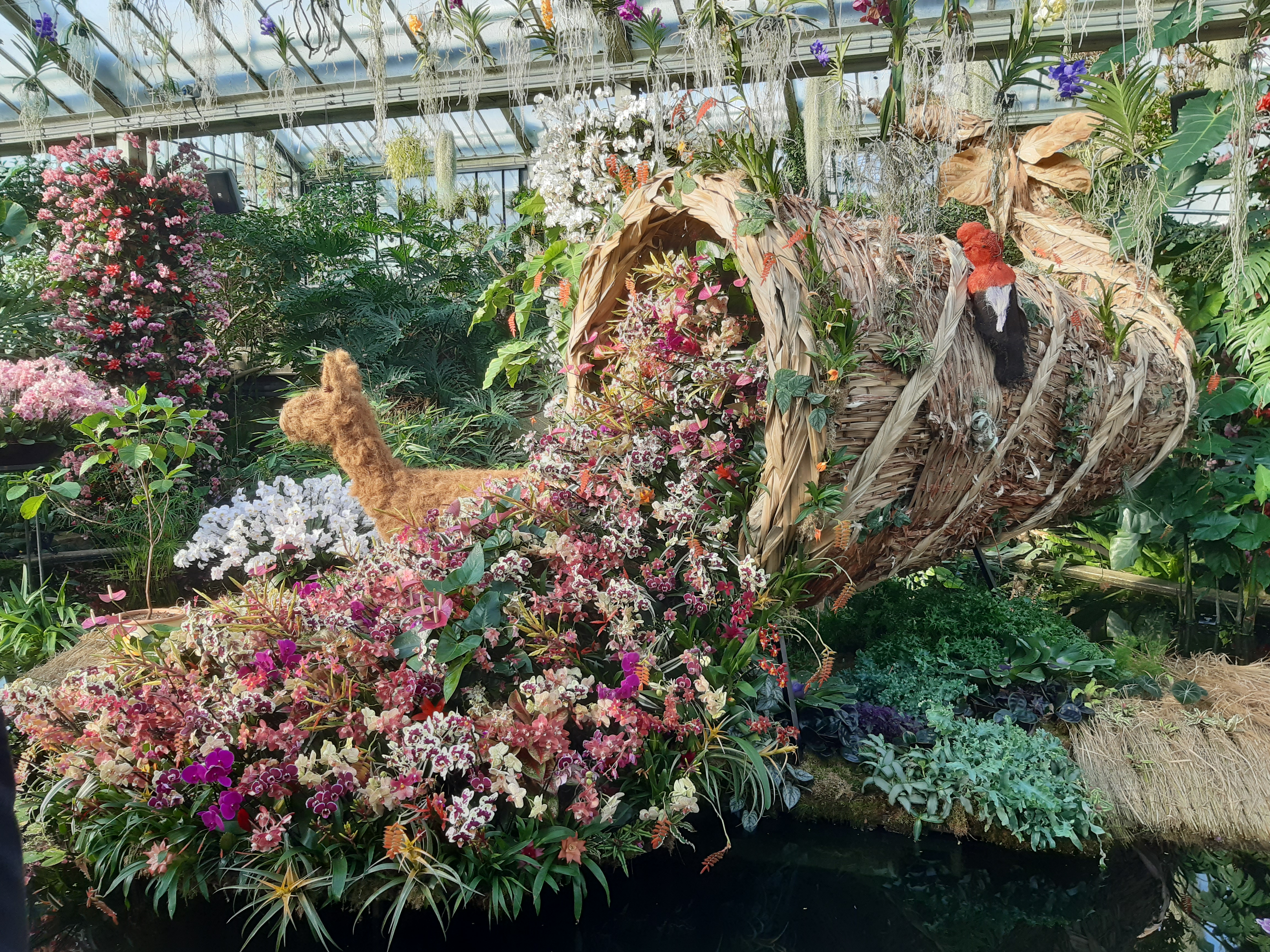
Giant cornucopia of orchids at Kew Gardens, 2025

In modern depictions, the cornucopia is typically a hollow, horn-shaped wicker basket filled with various kinds of festive fruit and vegetables. In most of North America, the cornucopia has come to be associated with Thanksgiving and the harvest. Cornucopia is also the name of the annual November Food and Wine celebration in Whistler, British Columbia, Canada. Two cornucopias are seen in the flag and state seal of Idaho. The Great Seal of North Carolina depicts Liberty standing and Plenty holding a cornucopia. The coats of arms of Colombia, Panama, Peru, Venezuela, Victoria, Australia and Kharkiv, Ukraine, also feature the cornucopia, symbolizing prosperity.

Cornucopia motifs appear in some modern literature, such as Terry Pratchett's Wintersmith and Suzanne Collins's The Hunger Games.

The horn of plenty is used for body art and at Thanksgiving, as it is a symbol of fertility, fortune and abundance.

== Gallery ==
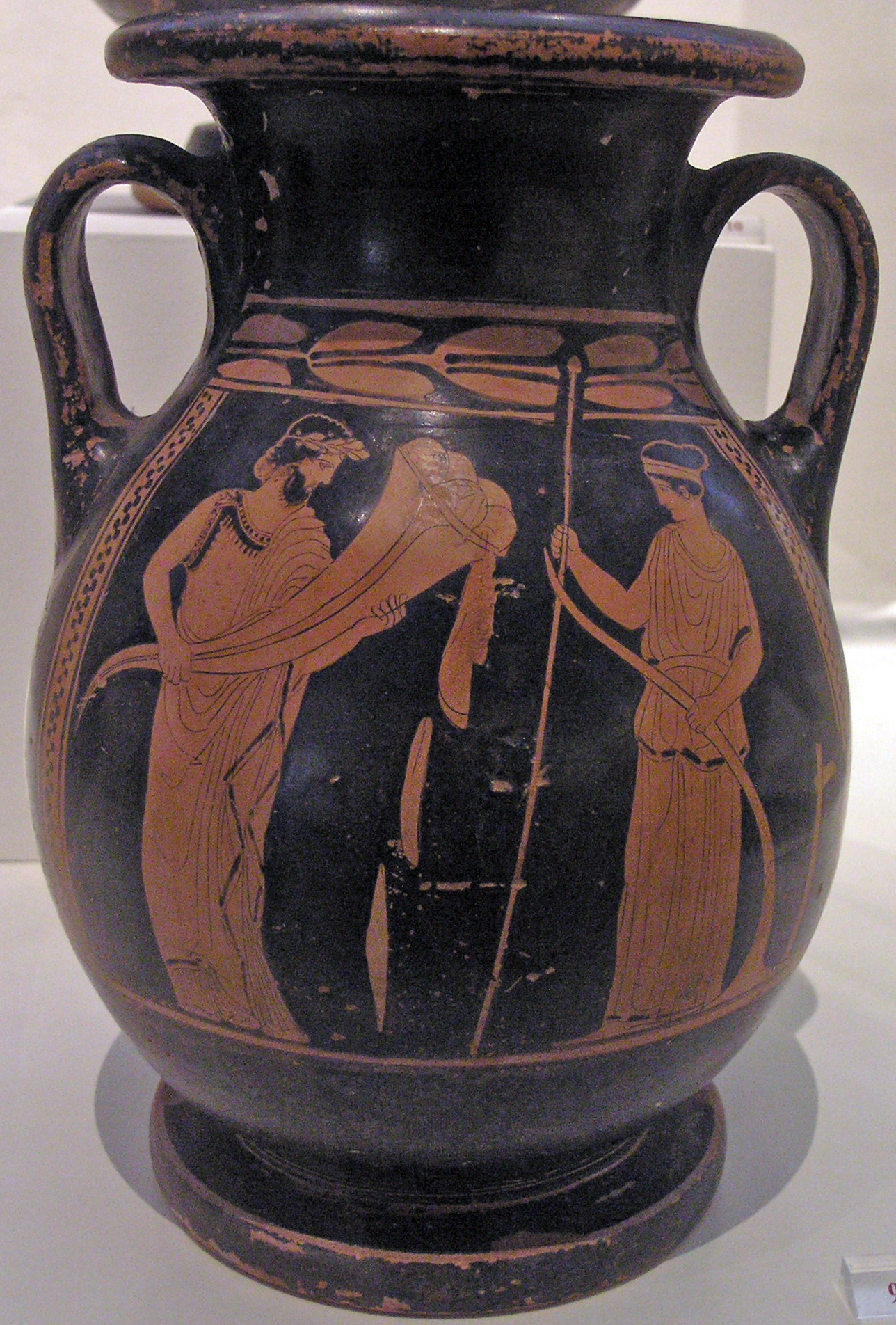
Greek vase of Plouton with a cornucopia and Demeter with a sceptre and plough, by the Orestes Painter, 440-430 BC, ceramic, National Archaeological Museum, Athens, Greece

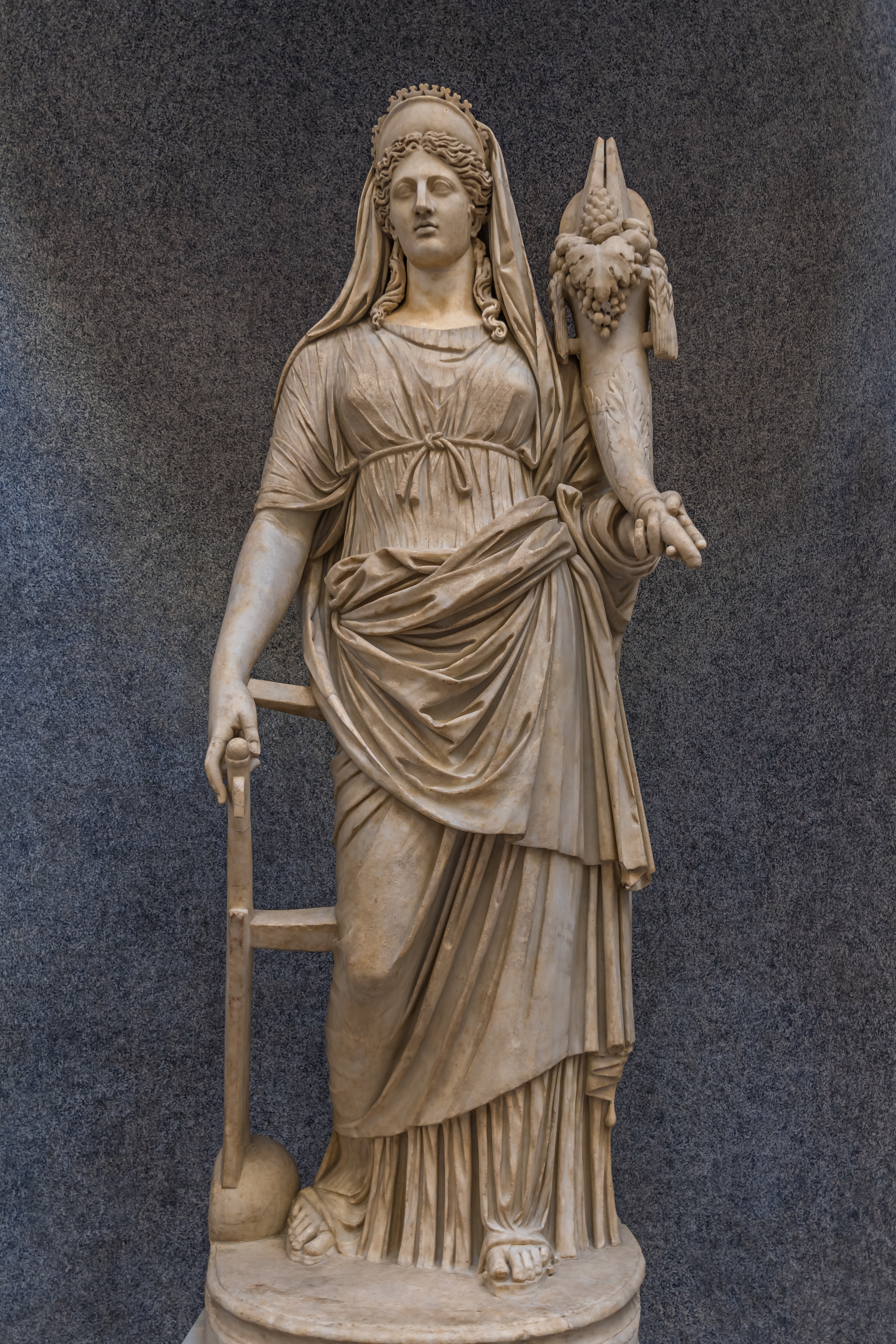
Roman statue of Fortuna, copy after a Greek original from the 4th century BC, marble, Vatican Museums, Rome

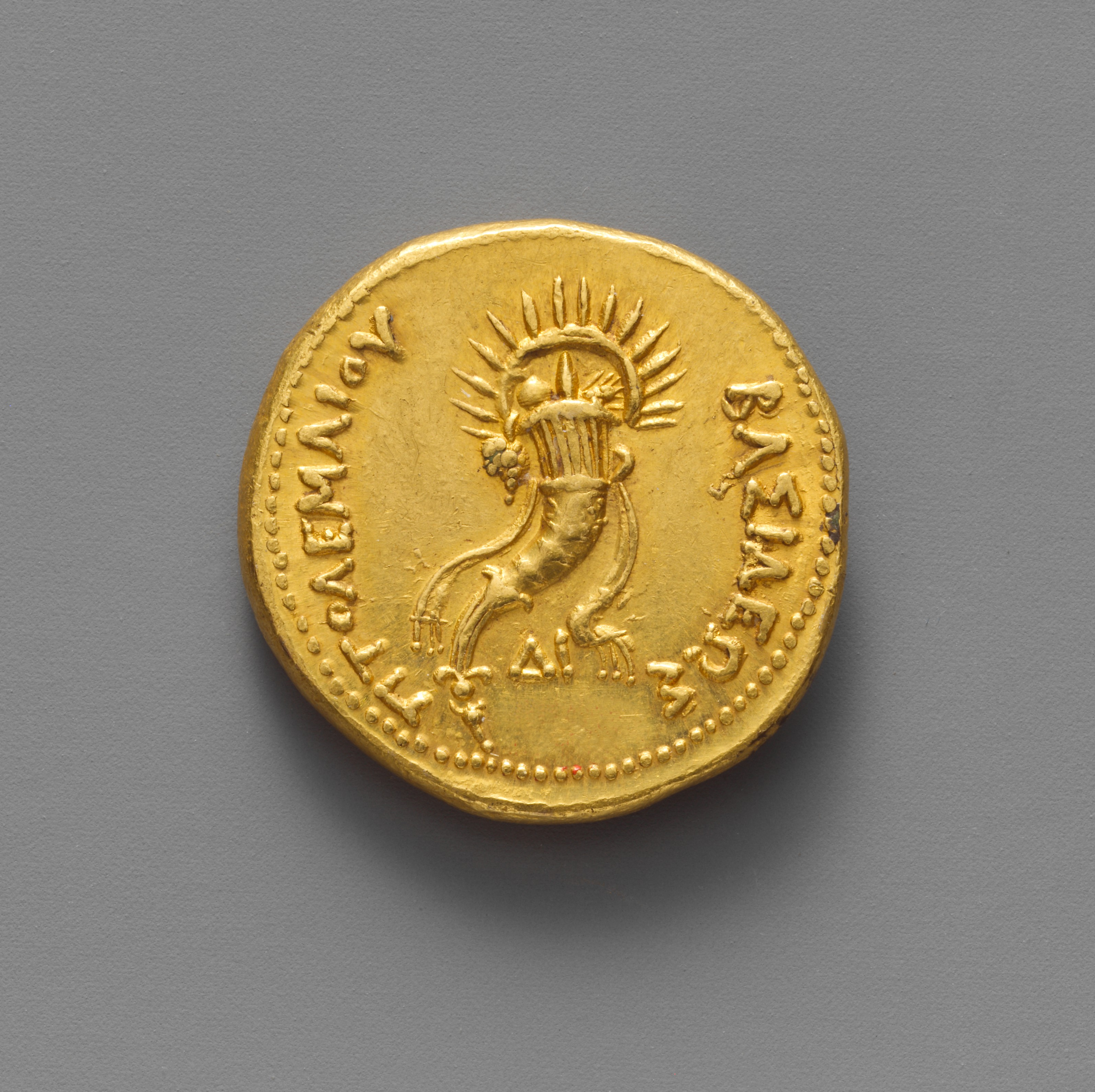
Ancient Greek octodrachm of Ptolemy IV Philopator with a cornucopia, 221–204 BC, gold, Metropolitan Museum of Art, New York

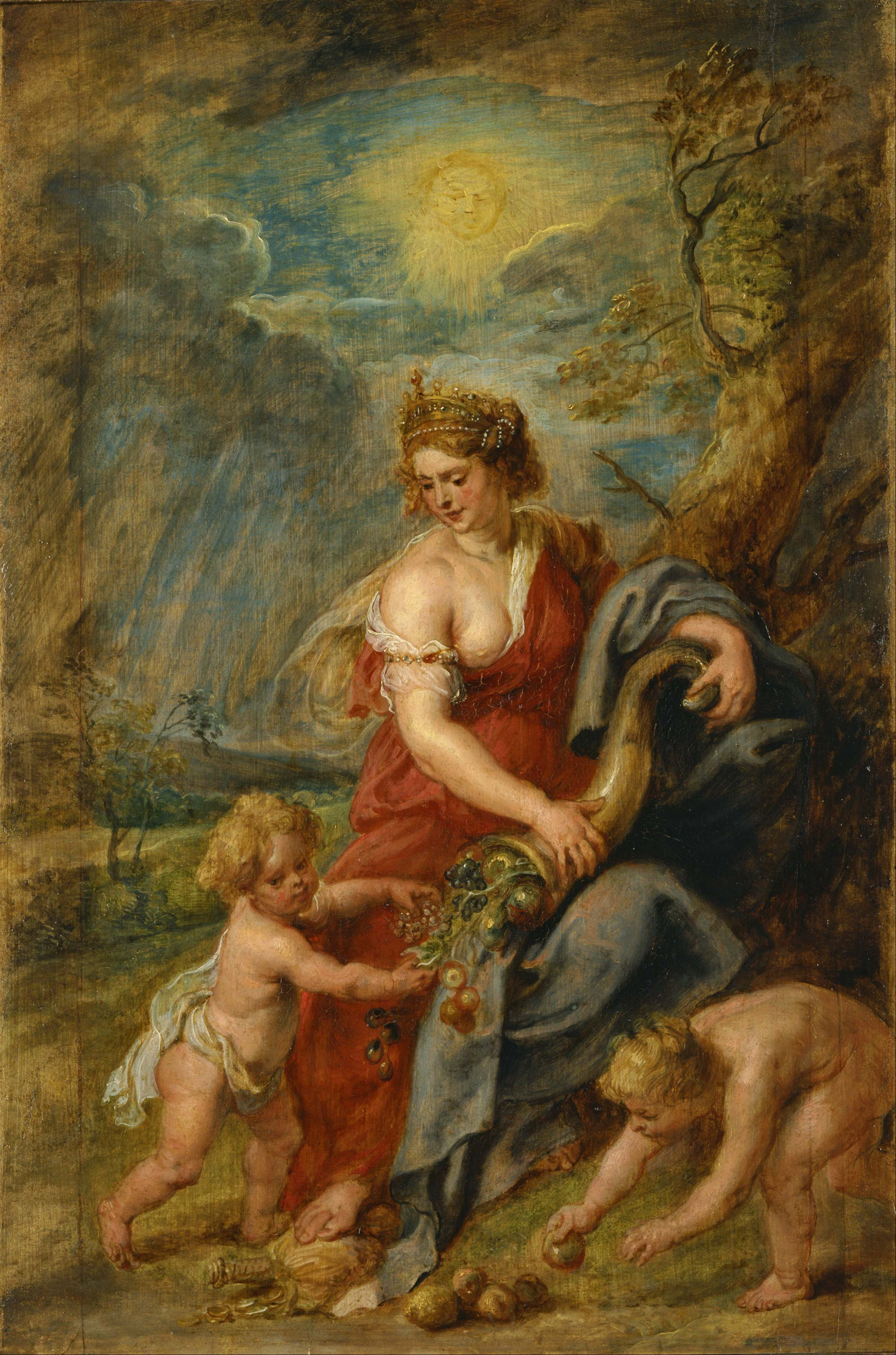
Allegorical depiction of the Roman goddess Abundantia with a cornucopia, by Rubens (c. 1630).

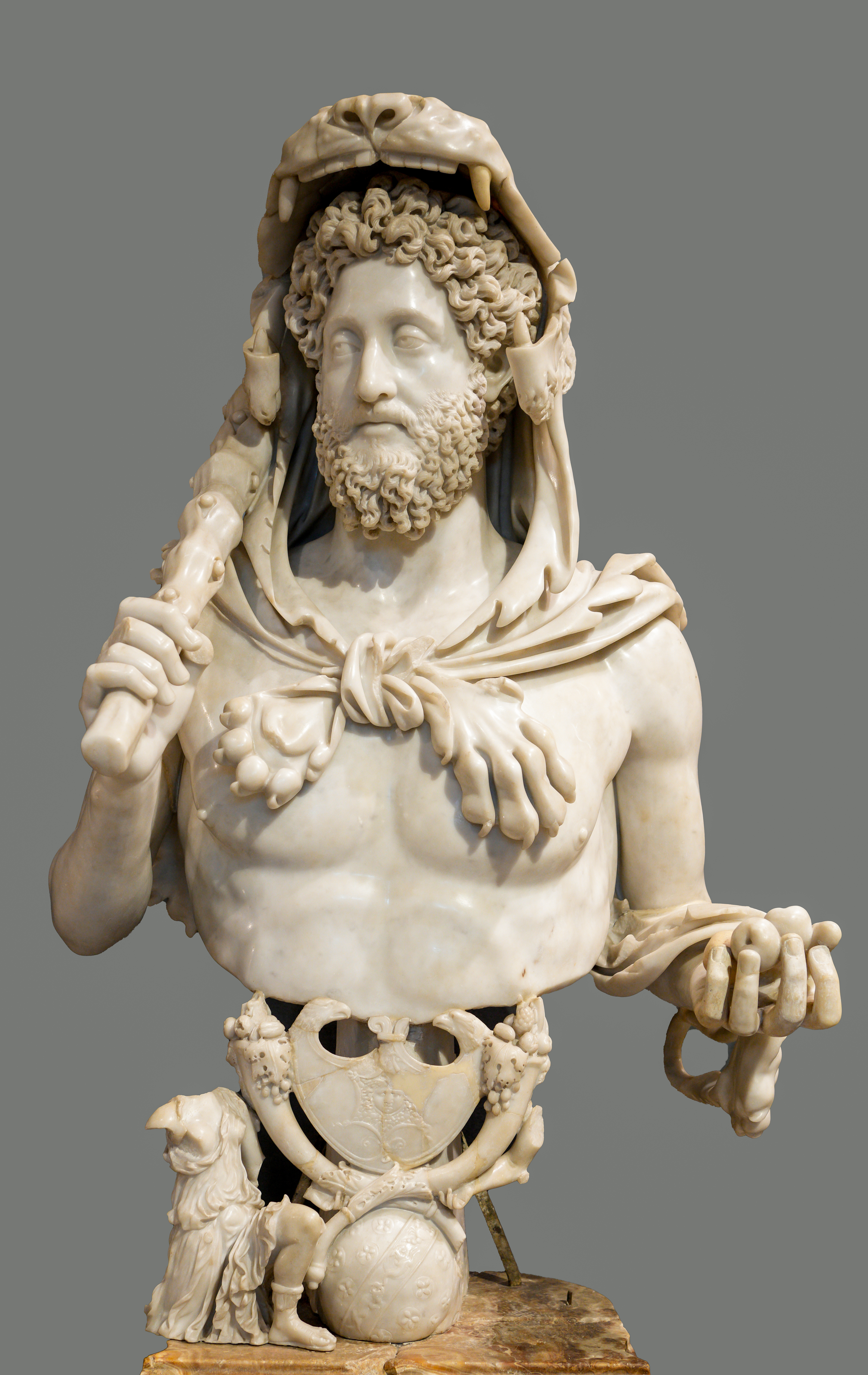
Roman cornucopia of Commodus as Hercules, c.192, marble, Capitoline Museums, Rome

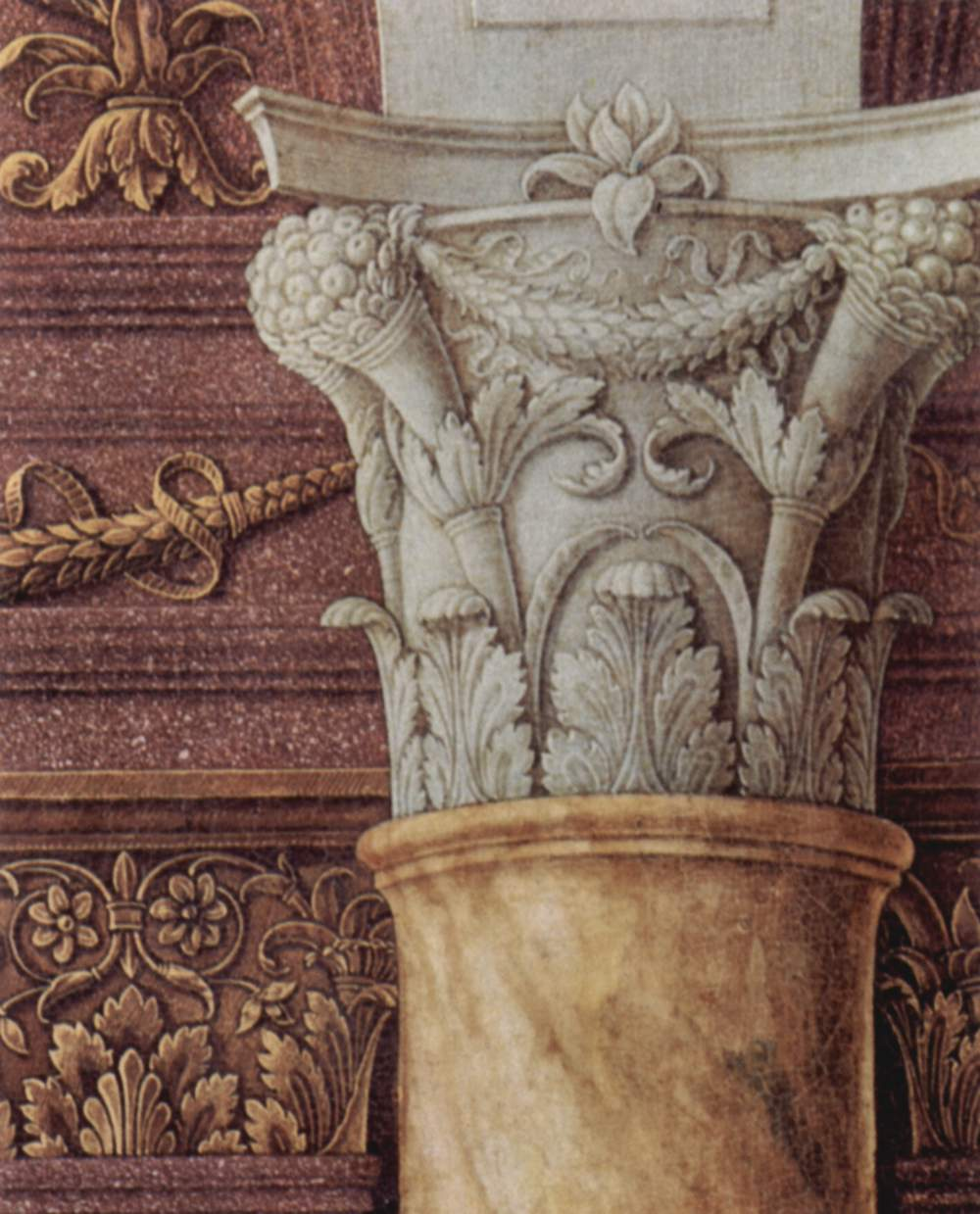
Renaissance column capital in The Circumsicion of Jesus, by Andrea Mantegna, c.1461, tempera on wood, Uffizi, Florence, Italy

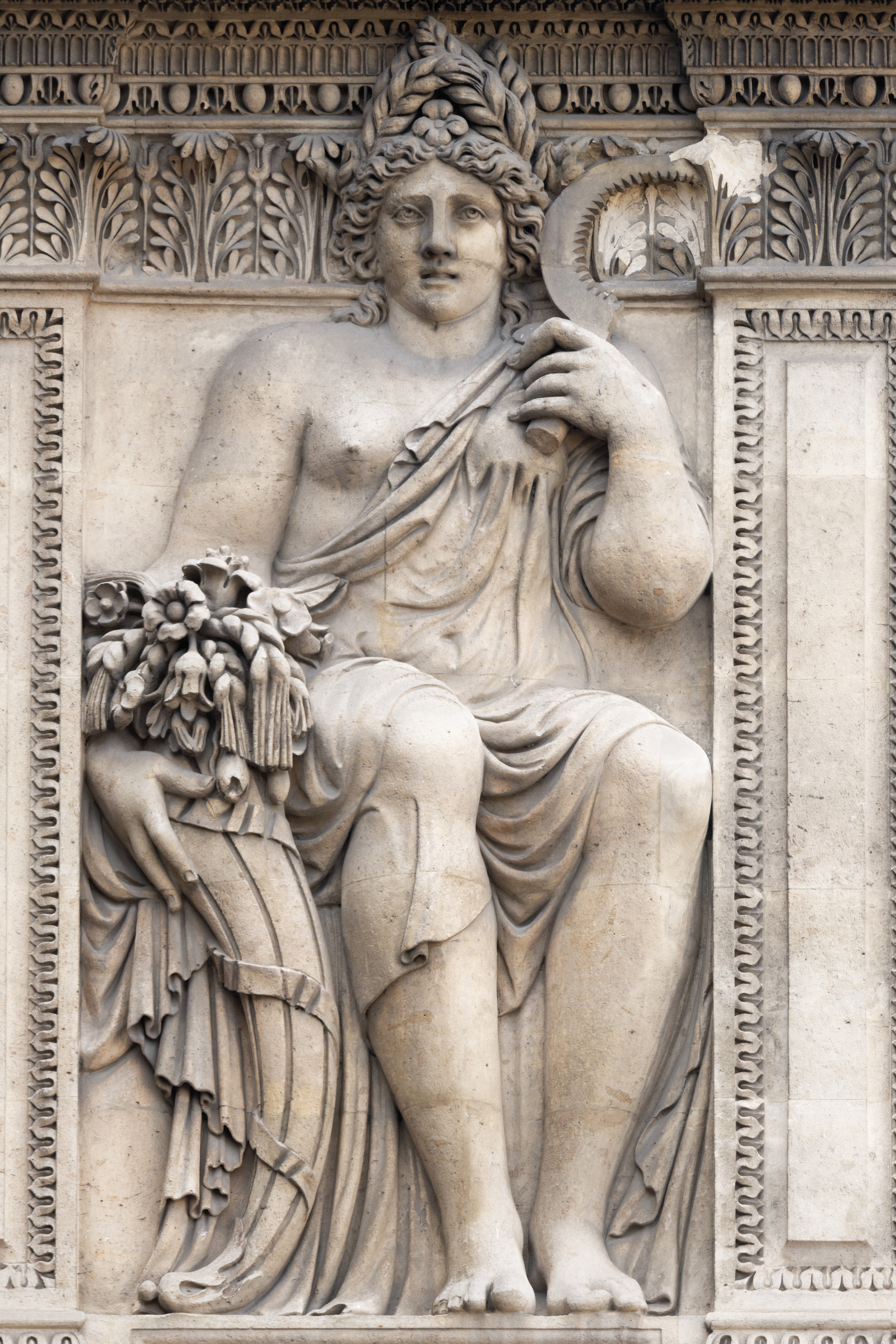
Renaissance relief of Ceres, on the east facade of the Lescot Wing in the Cour Carrée, Louvre Palace, by Jean Goujon, 1553

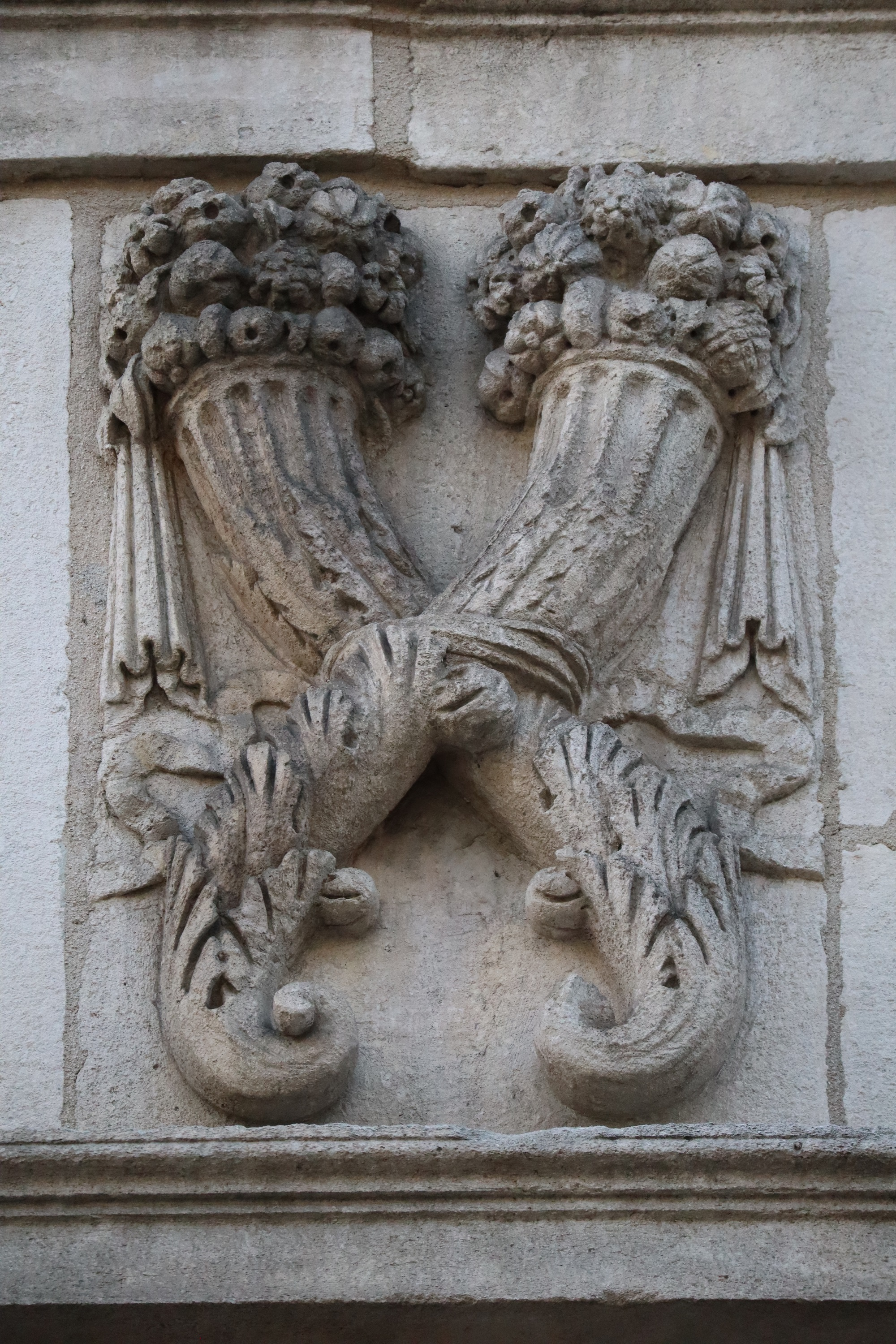
Renaissance cornucopia on the Maison des Cariatides, Dijon, France, unknown architect or sculptor, c.1550-1600

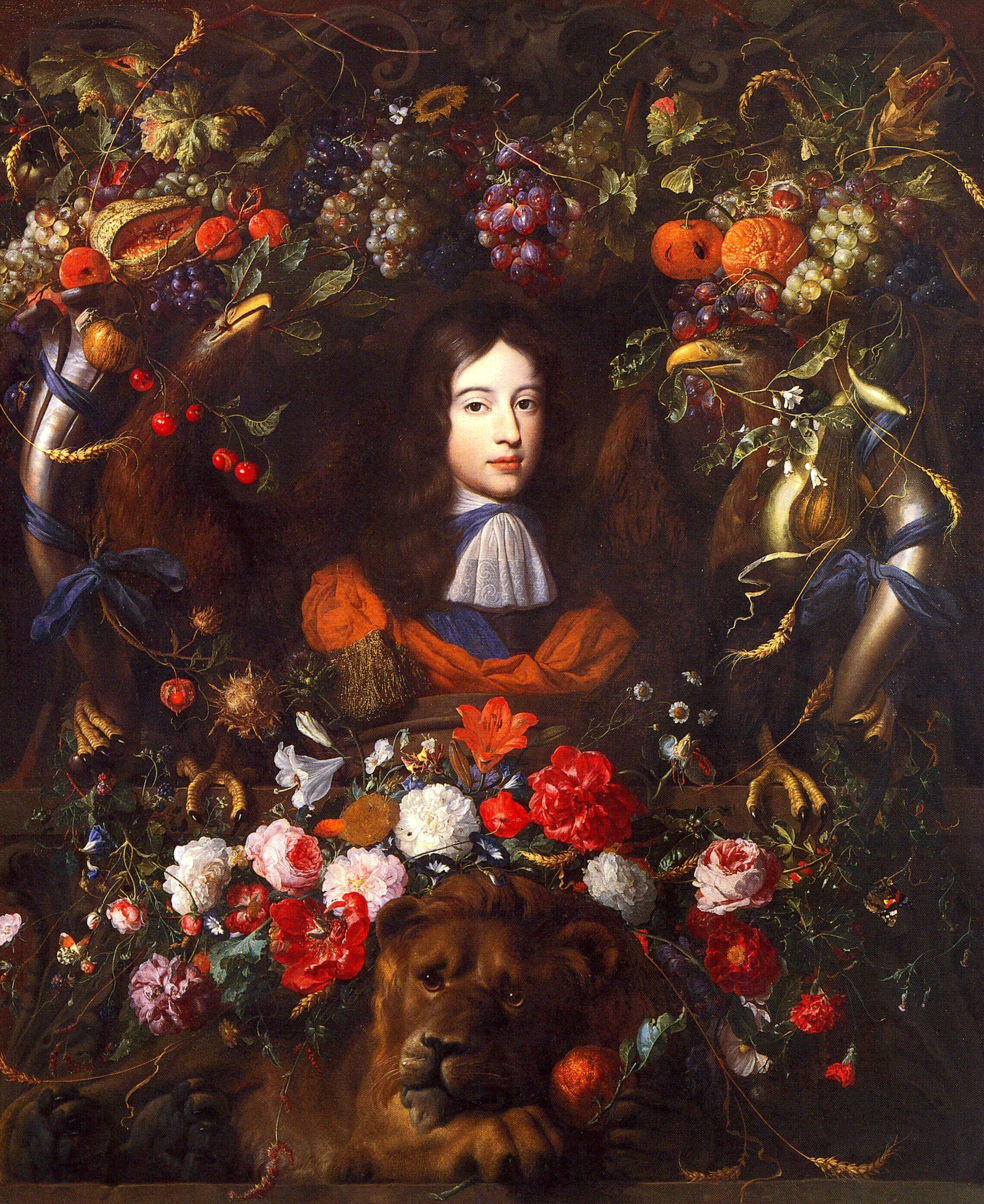
Portrait of William III of Orange, aged 10, portrait by Jan Vermeer van Utrecht and decor by Jan Davidsz. de Heem, c.1659-1666, oil on canvas, Museum of Fine Arts of Lyon, France

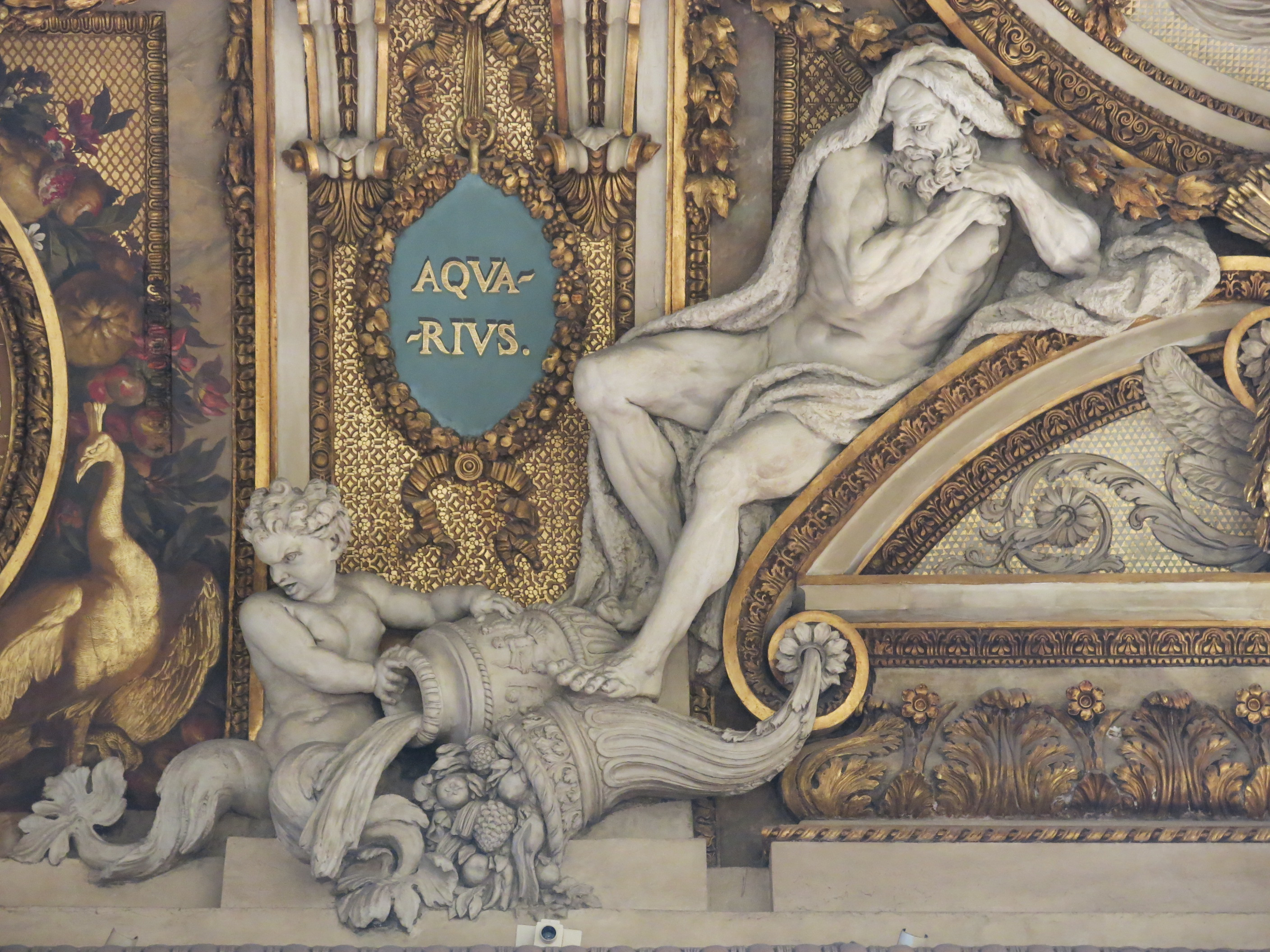
Baroque cornucopia in the ceiling of the Galerie d'Apollon, Louvre Palace, Paris, by Louis Le Vau and Charles Le Brun, after 1661

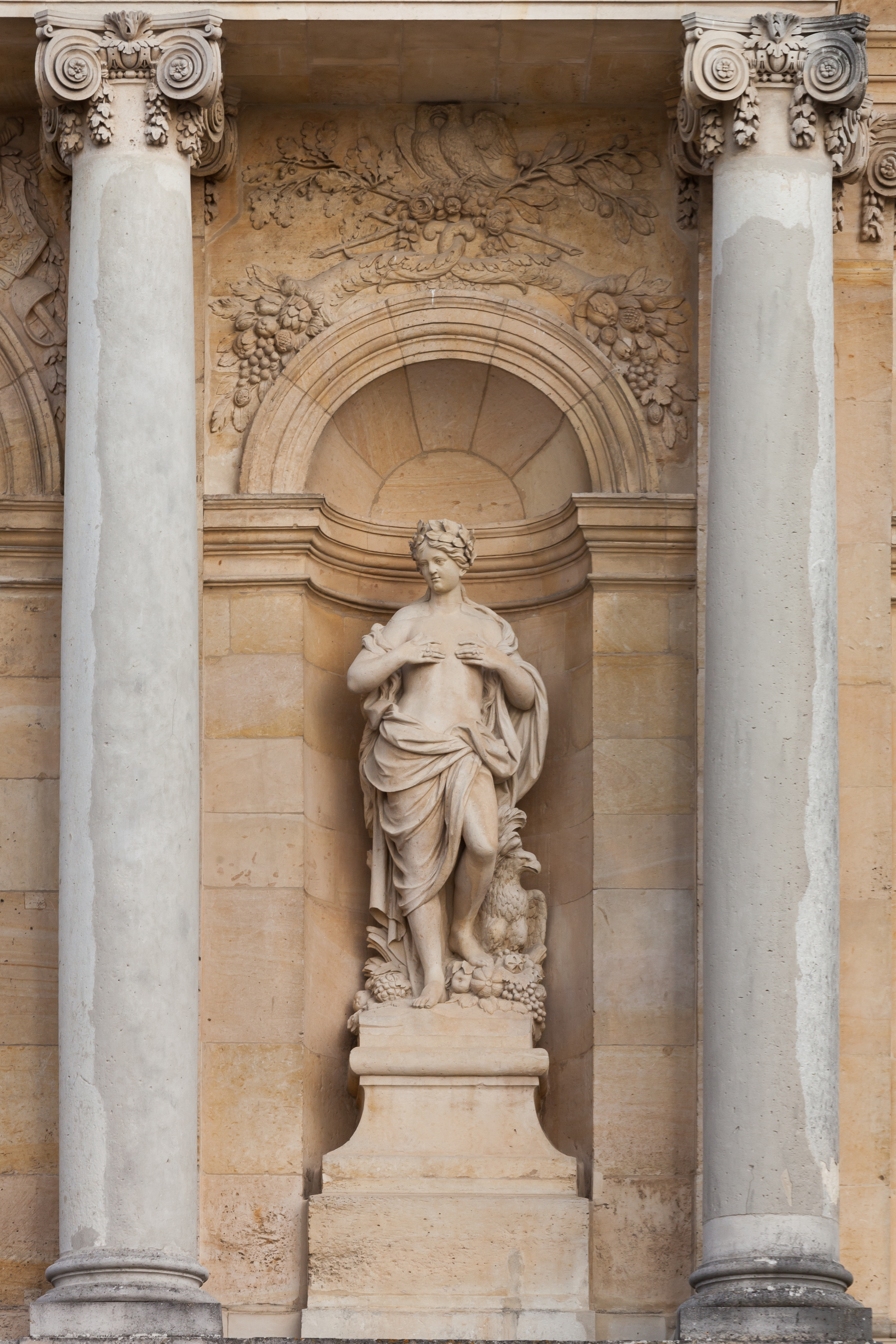
Baroque pair of cornucopias on the garden façade of the Palace of Versailles, Versailles, France, by Jules Hardouin-Mansart, 1678–1688

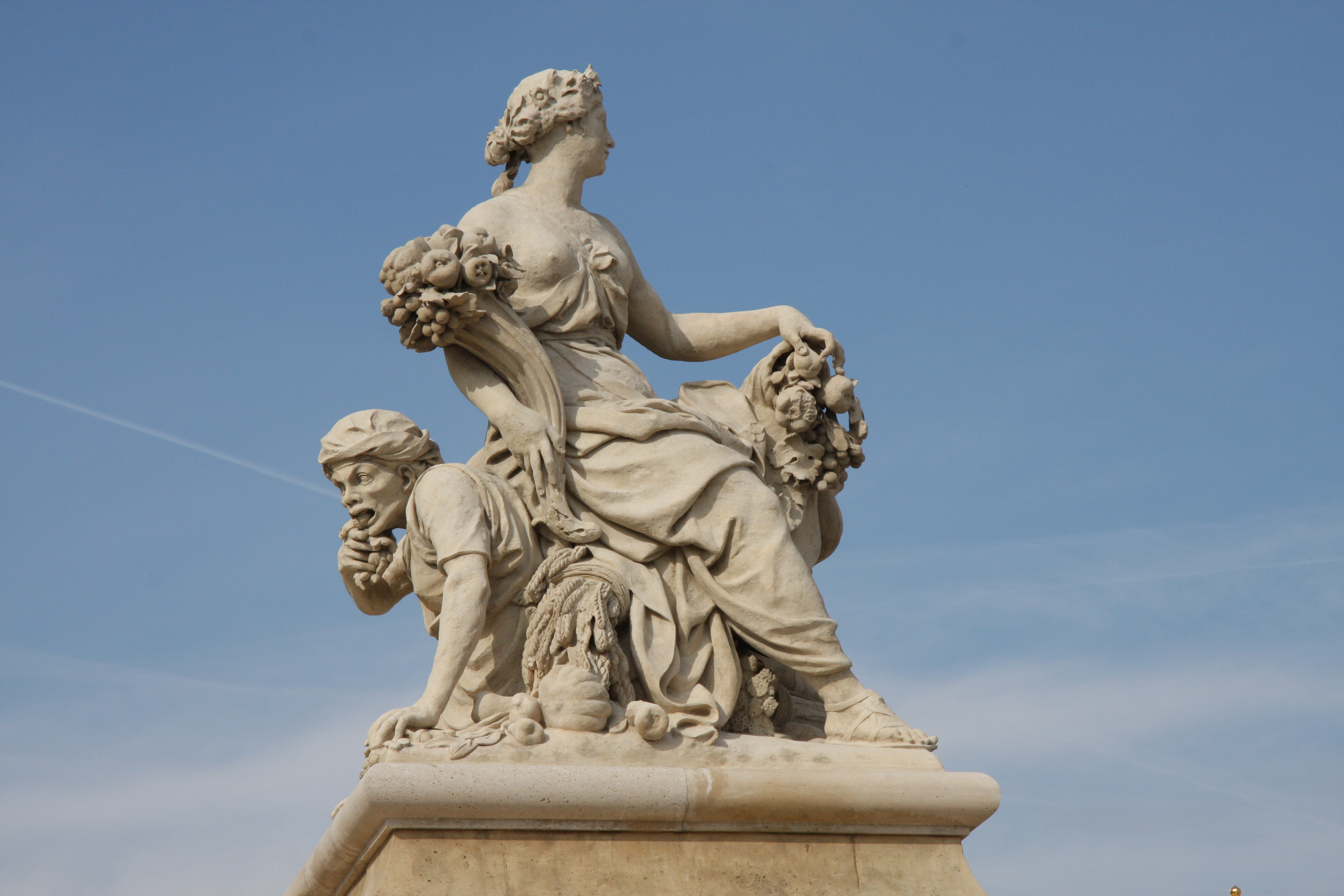
L’Abondance, by Antoine Coysevox, 1682, unknown stone, Palace of Versailles, Versailles, France

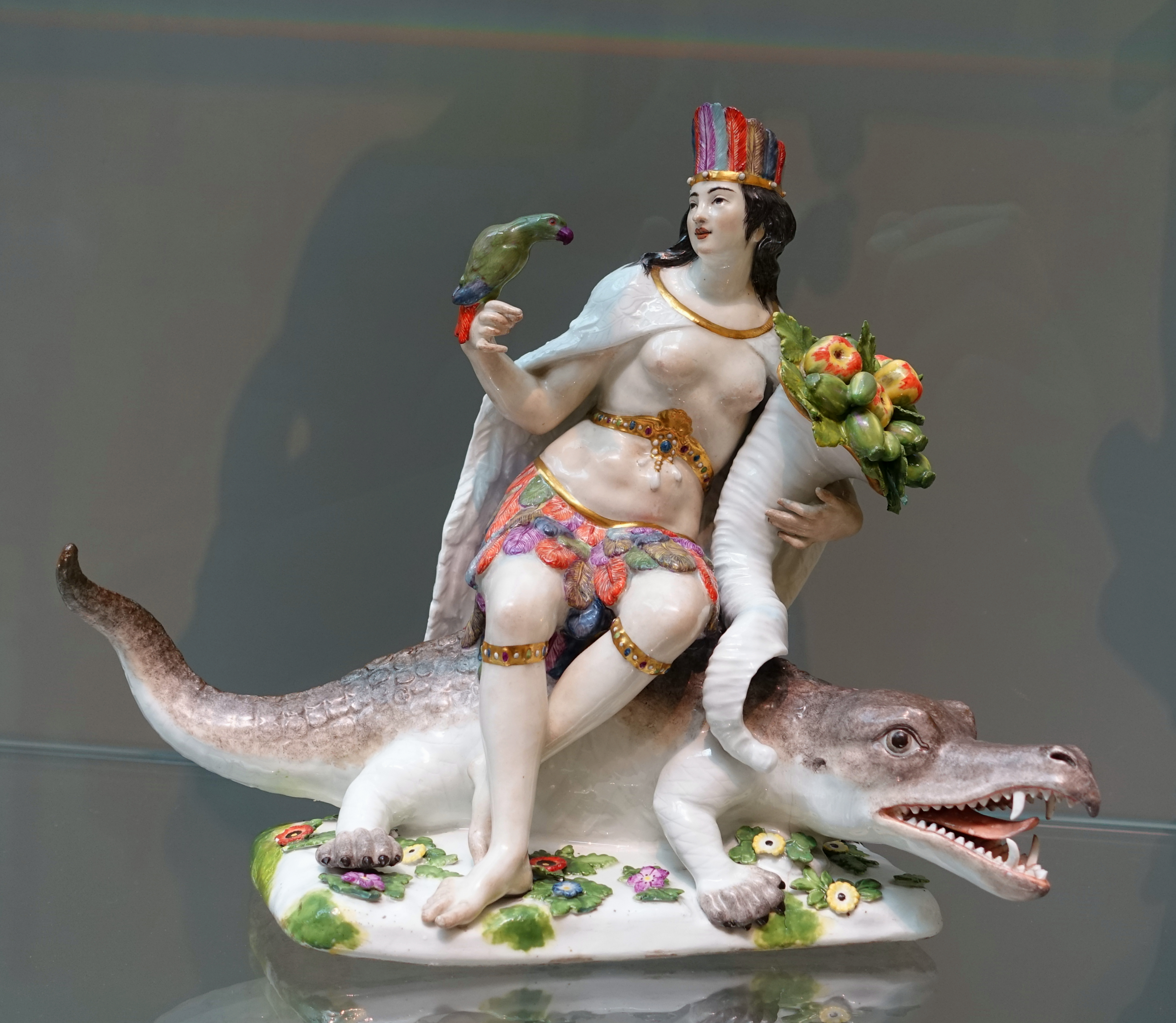
Rococo personification of the Americas with an alligator, a parrot, and a cornucopia, all symbols of the New World, designed by Johann Joachim Kändler and produced by the Meissen Porcelain Factory, c.1760, porcelain, Wadsworth Atheneum, Hartford, Connecticut, US

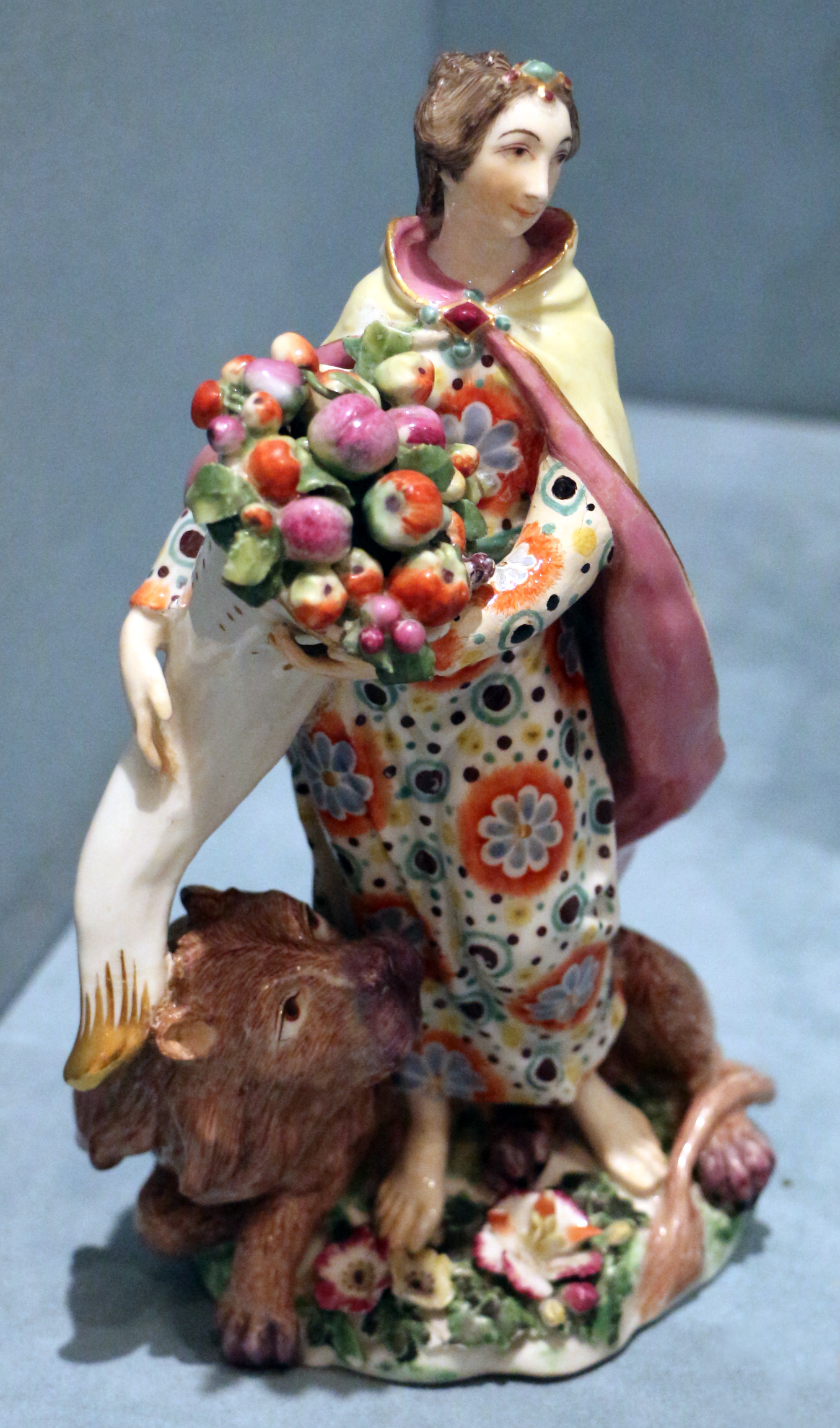
Rococo personification of earth (classical element), by the Chelsea Porcelain Factory, c.1760-1770, porcelain, Indianapolis Museum of Art, Indianapolis, US

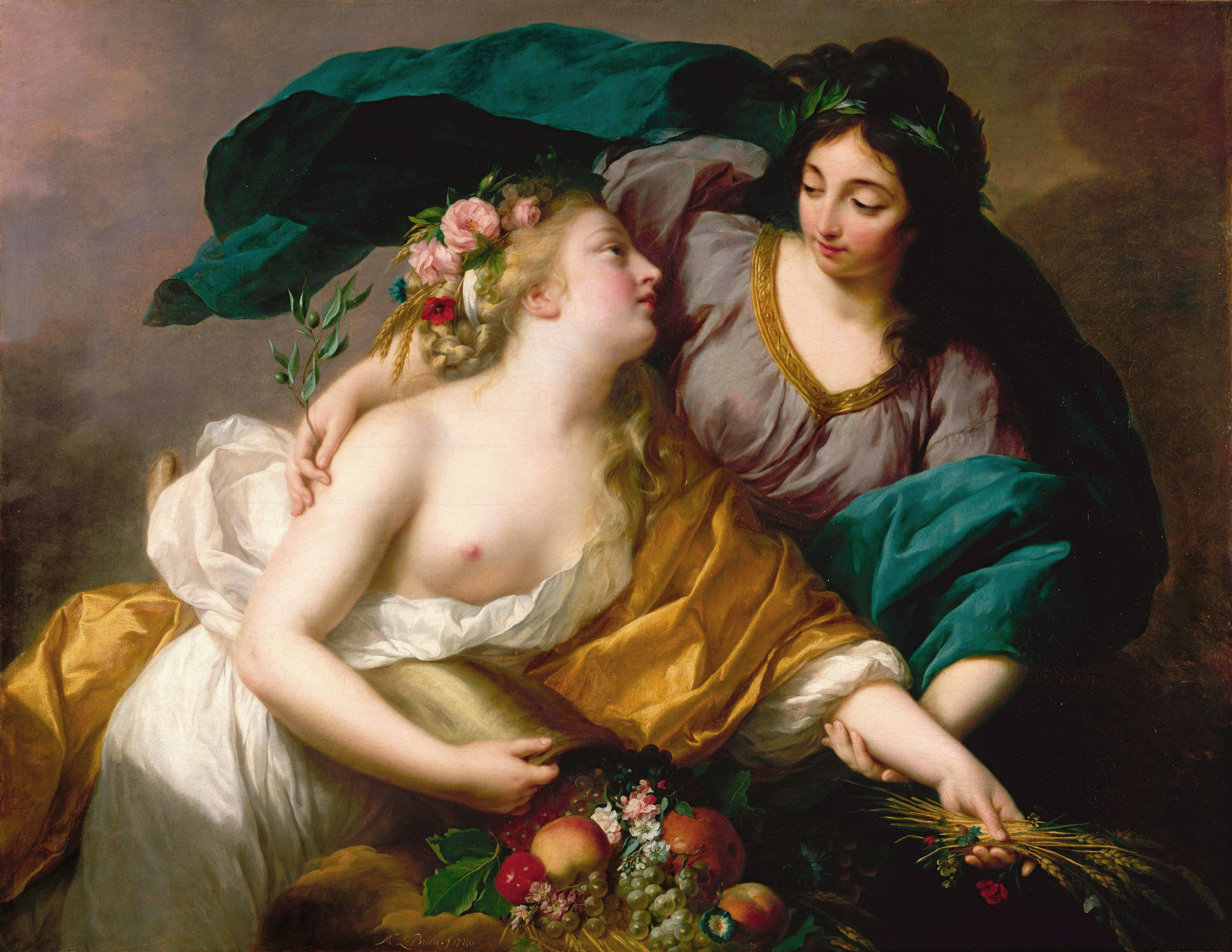
Peace bringing back Prosperity, by Élisabeth Vigée Le Brun, 1780, oil on canvas, Louvre

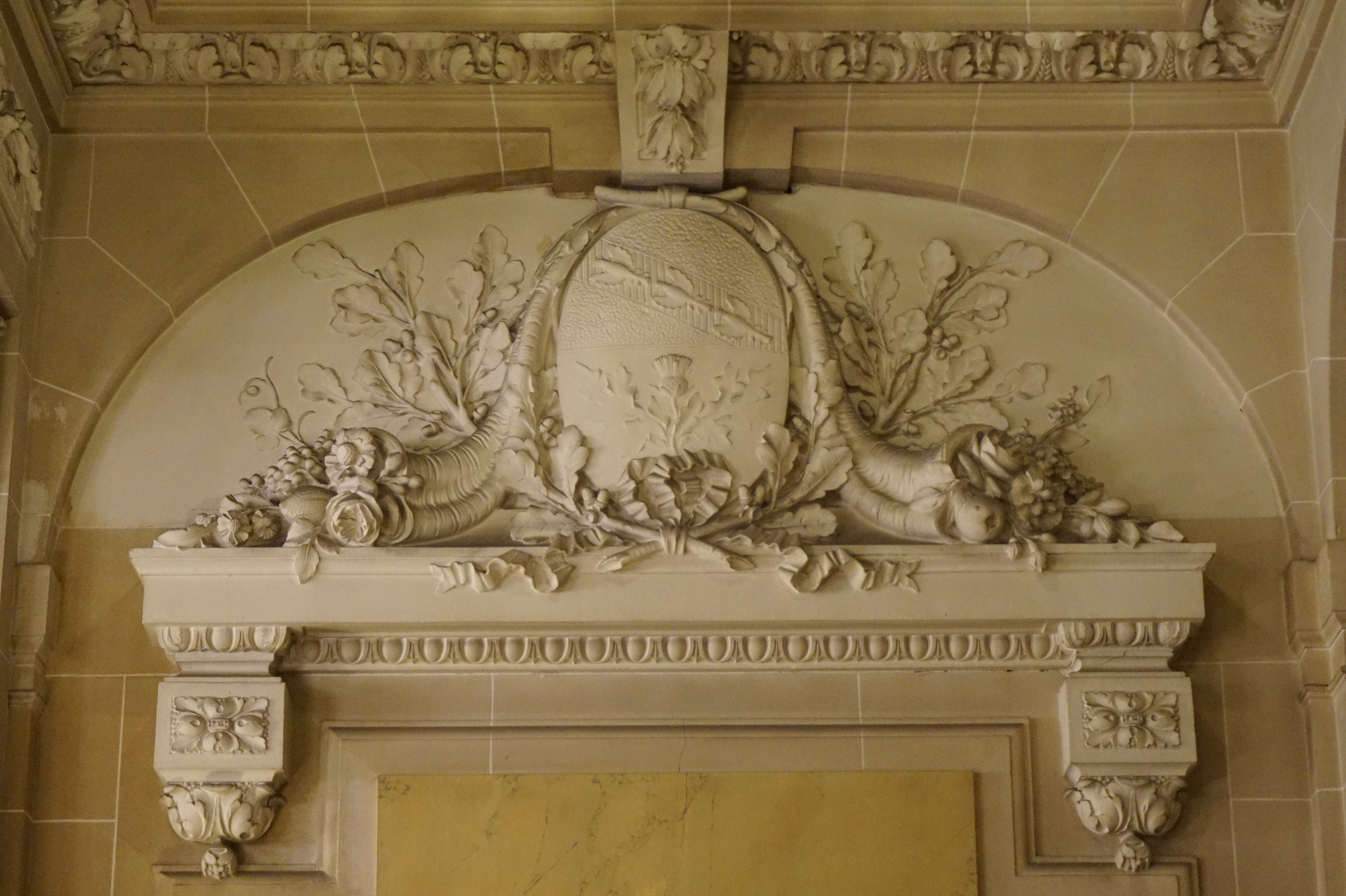
Rococo pair of cornucopias in the Opéra national de Lorraine, Nancy, France, designed by Jean-François de La Borde, 1753

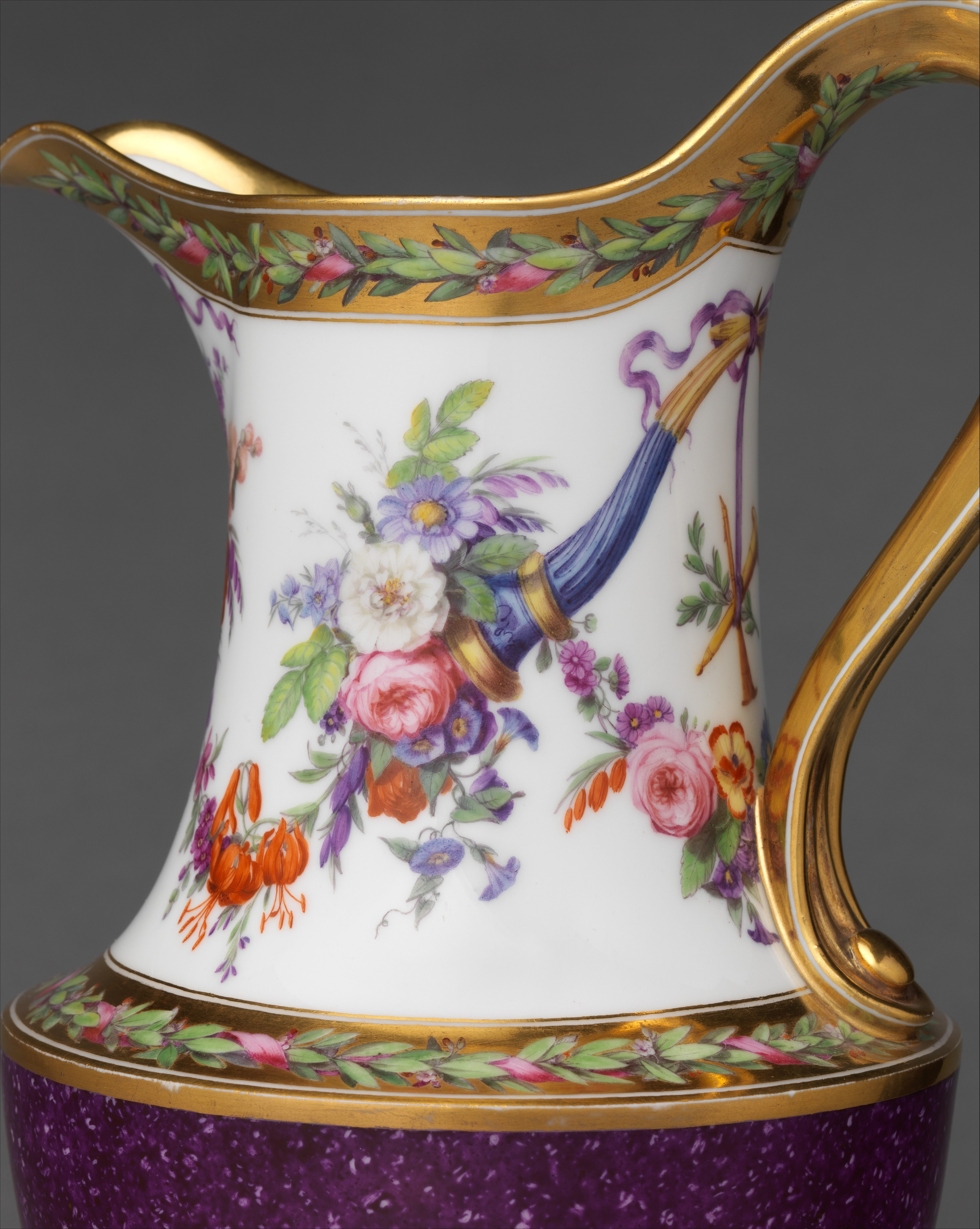
Louis XVI style cornucopia on an ewer, by François Antoine Pfeiffer, Gilbert Drouet and the Sèvres Porcelain Factory, 1795, hard-paste porcelain, Metropolitan Museum of Art

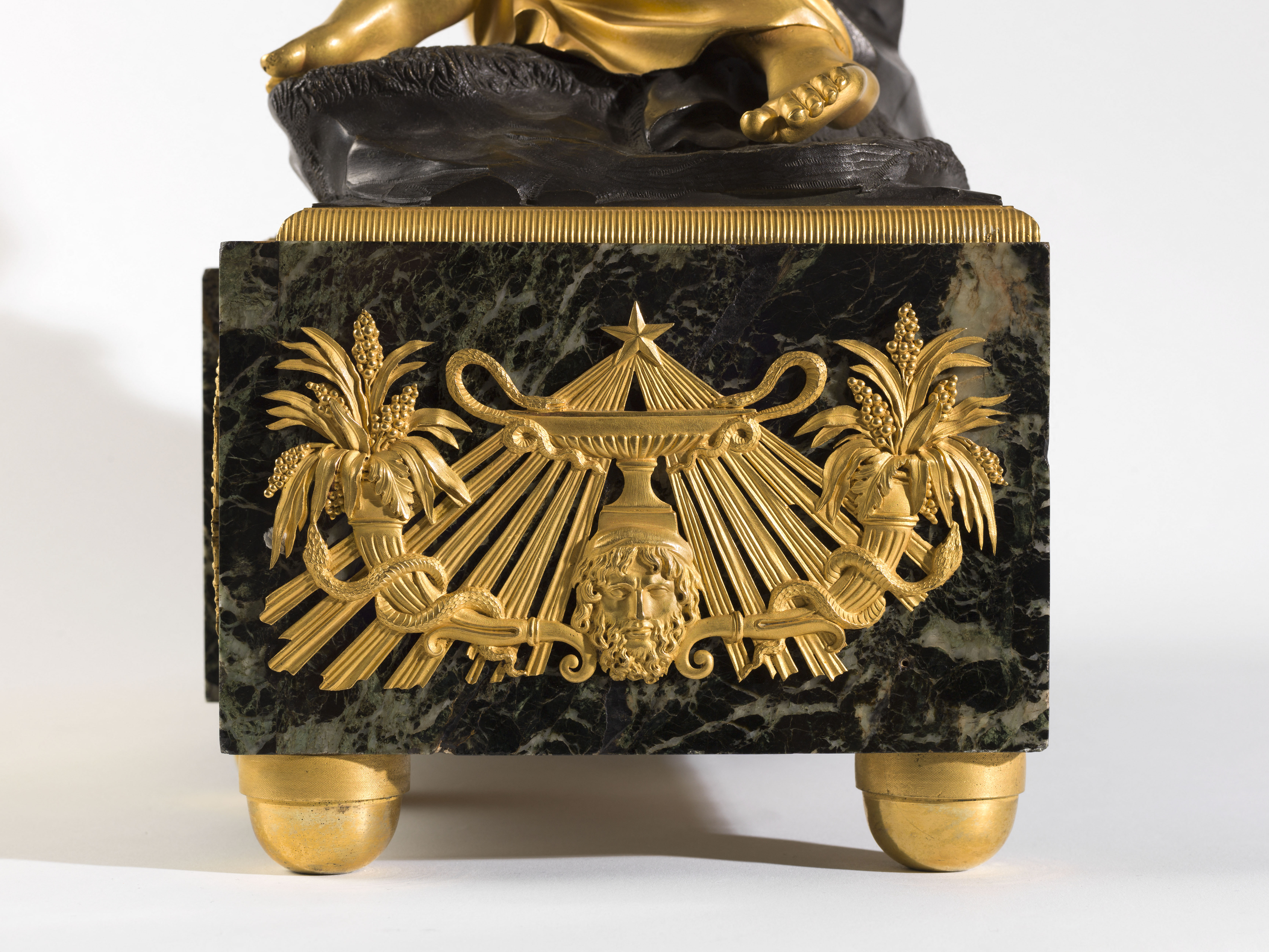
Neoclassical cornucopias on the pedestal of a clock, by Antoine André Ravrio, early 19th century, marble and gilt bronze, Petit Palais

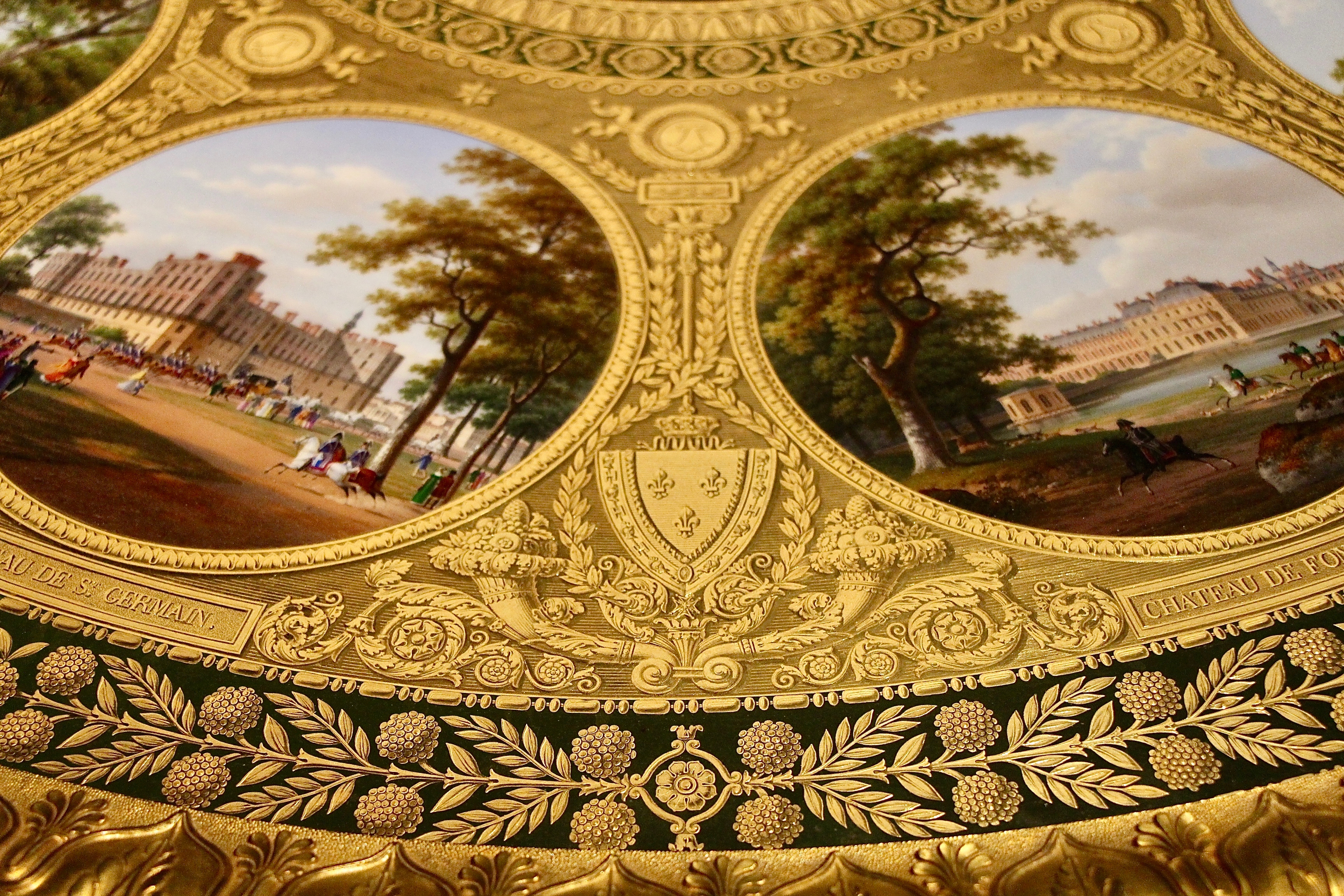
Neoclassical cornucopias on a table, by the Sèvres Porcelain Manufactory, 1811-1814, modified in 1814-1817, hard-paste porcelain and gilded bronze, in a temporary exhibition called Art and Court Life in the Imperial Palace at the Montreal Museum of Fine Arts, Canada

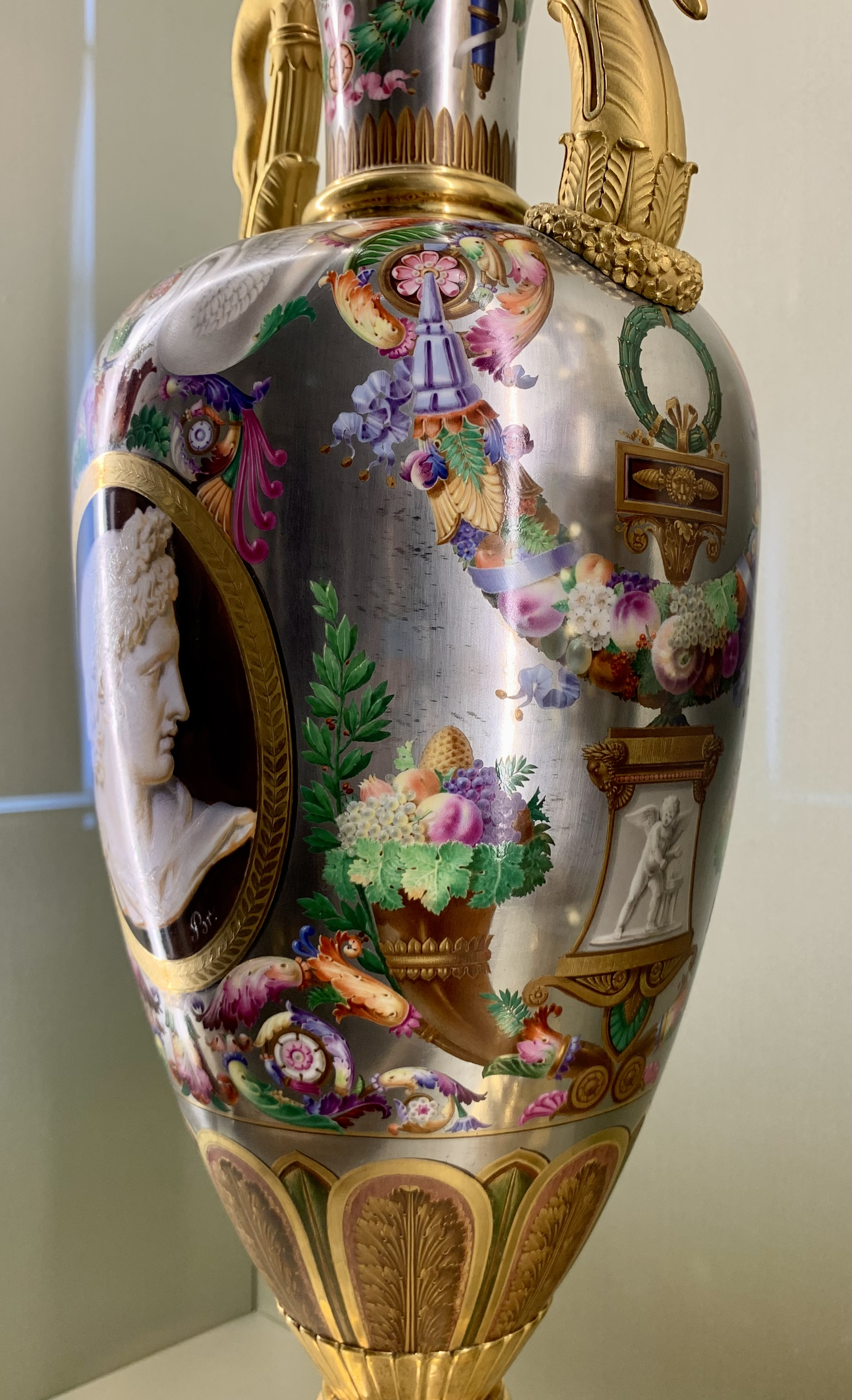
Neoclassical cornucopia on a vase, by the Sèvres Porcelain Factory, 1814, hard-paste porcelain with platinum background and gilt bronze mounts, Louvre

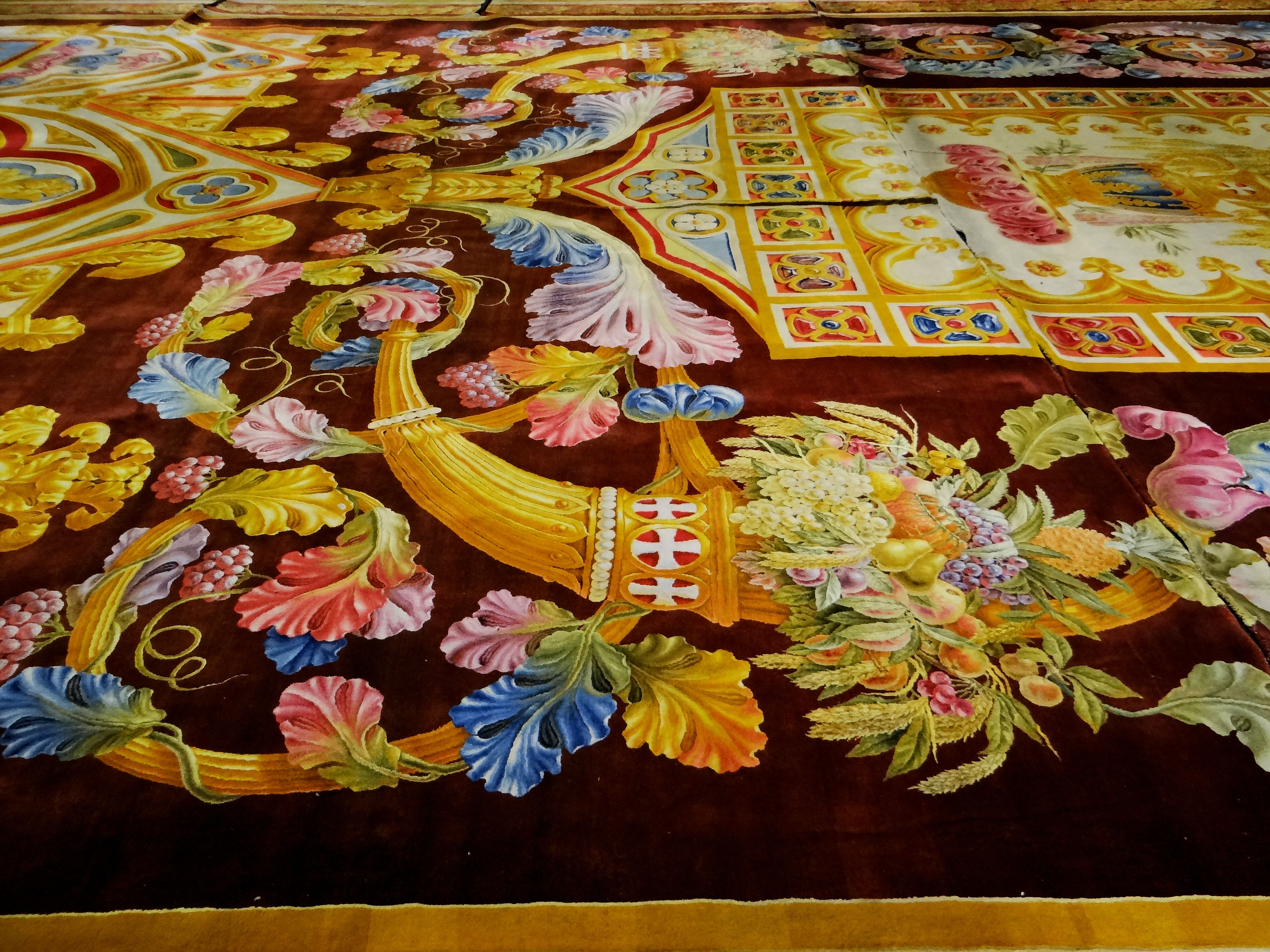
Neoclassical cornucopias on the Choir Carpet of Notre-Dame de Paris, by the Gobelins Manufactory, 1825-1833

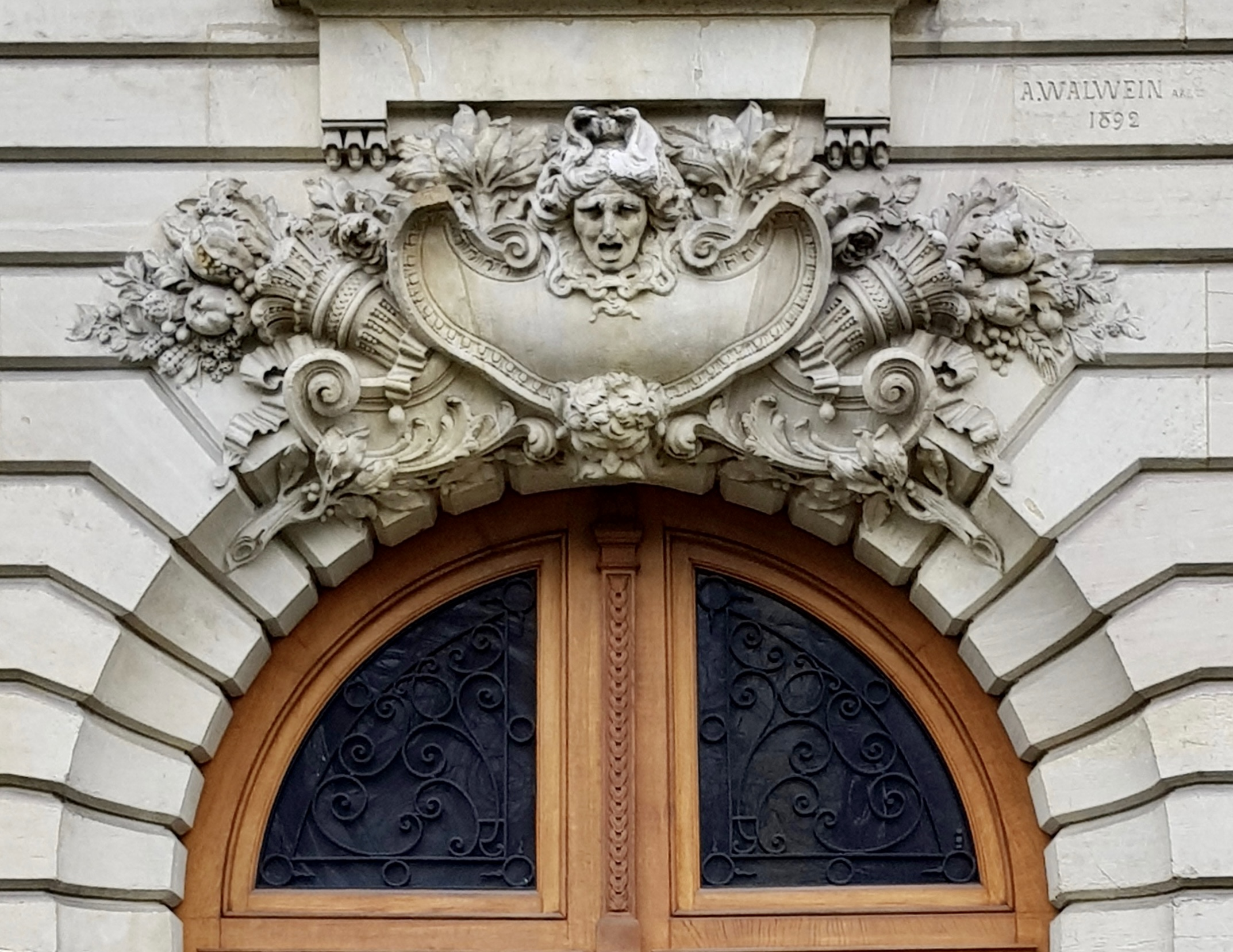
Two Beaux-Arts mascarons of Avenue Henri-Martin no. 87, Paris, designed by Albert Walwein, 1892

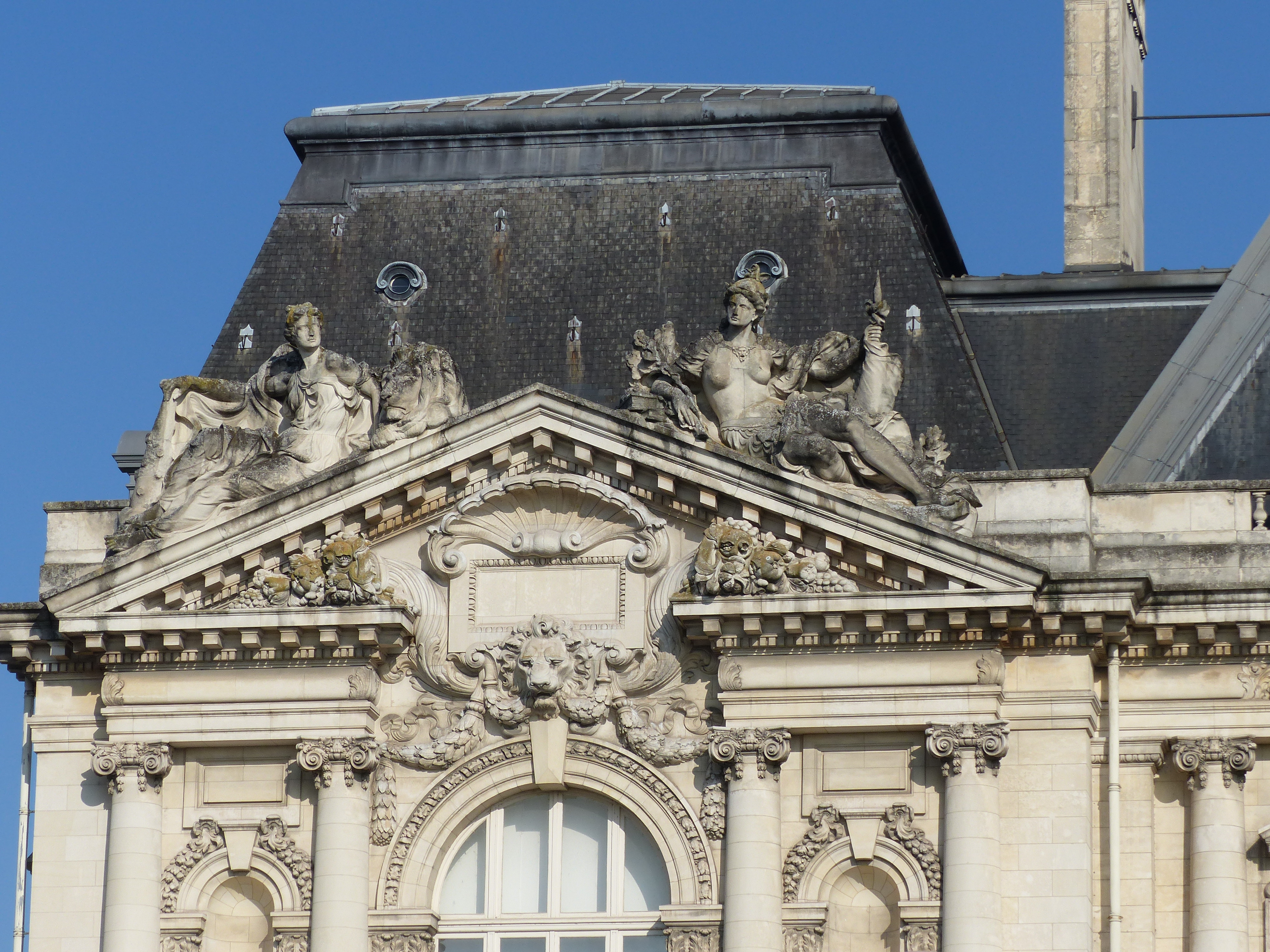
Beaux-Arts cornucopias on the city hall of Tours, France, by Victor Laloux, 1896-1904

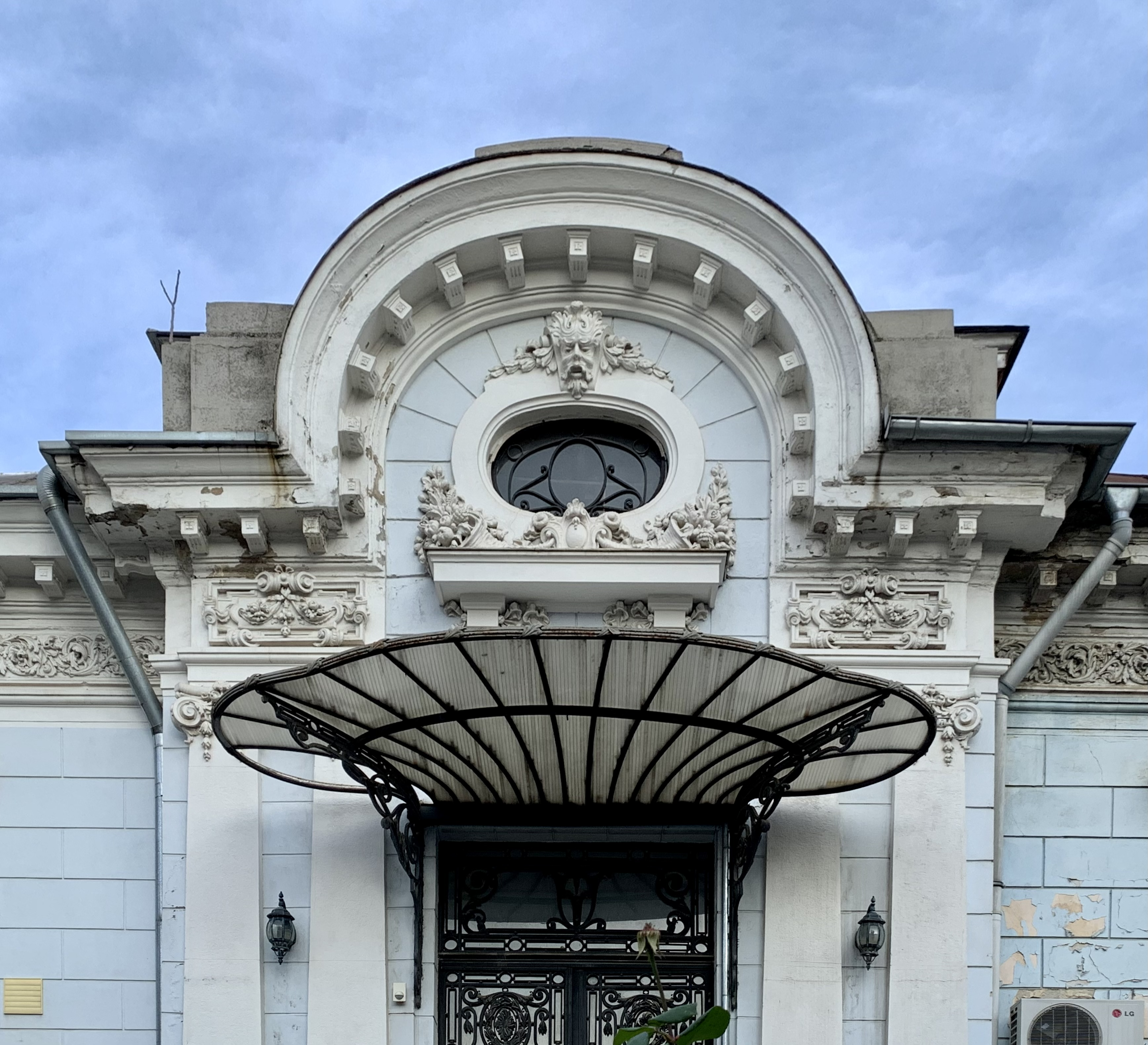
Beaux-Arts conrnucopias of Strada Termopile no. 2, Bucharest, unknown architect, c.1900

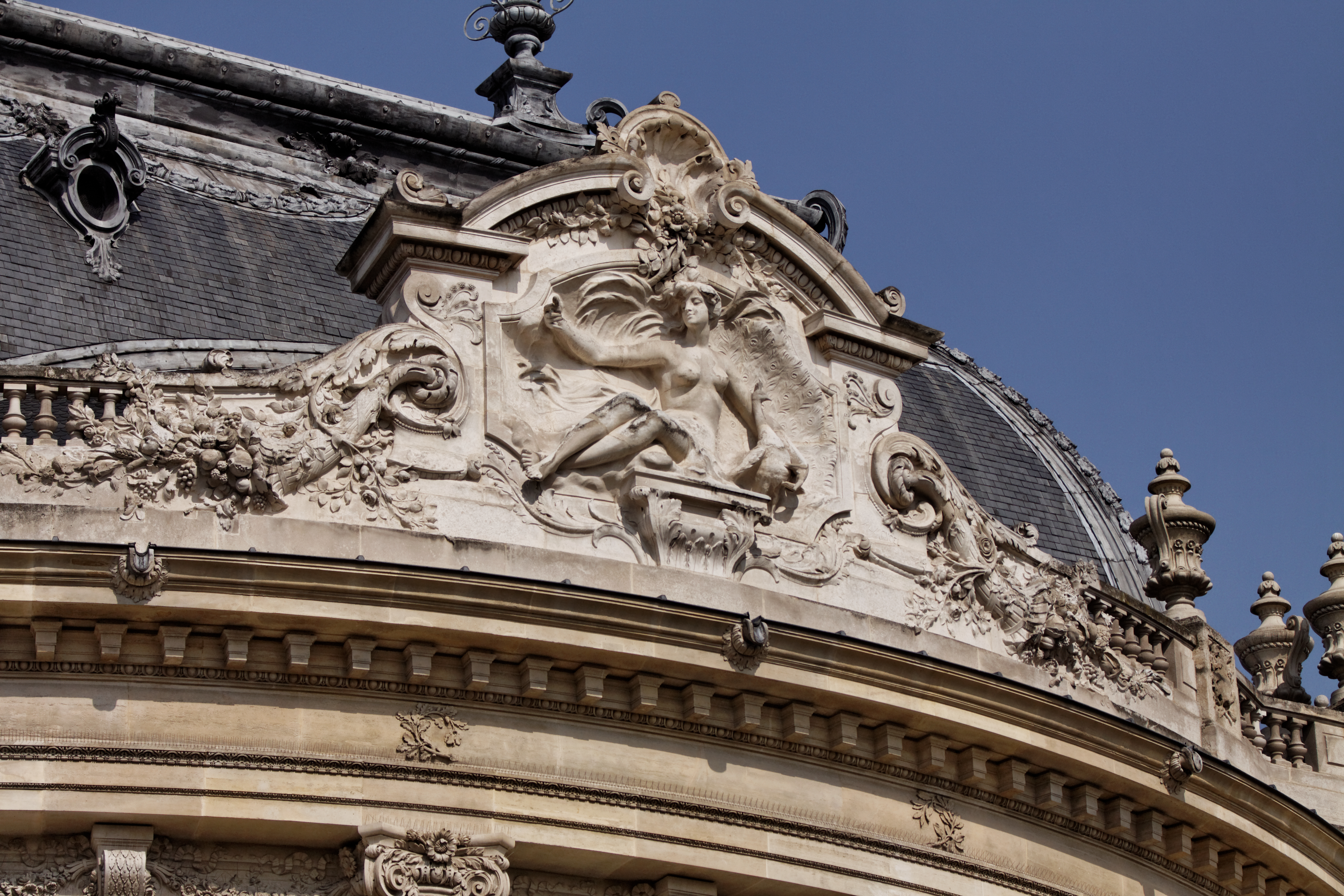
Beaux-Arts cornucopias on the Petit Palais, Paris, by Charles Giraud, 1900

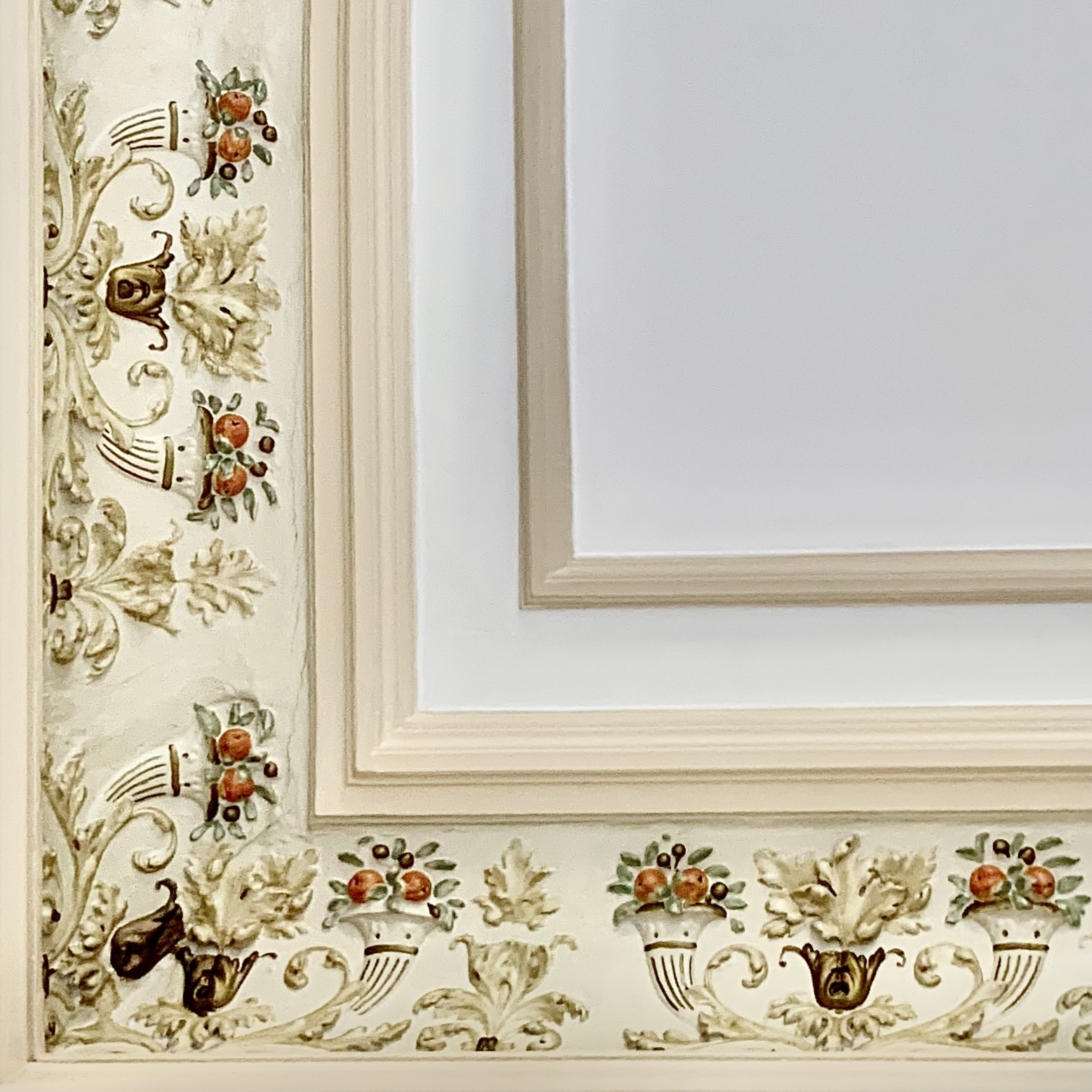
Beaux-Arts stuccos with pairs of cornucopias in the Generala Building (Bulevardul Regina Elisabeta no. 5), Bucharest, Romania, by Oscar Maugsch, 1906-1908

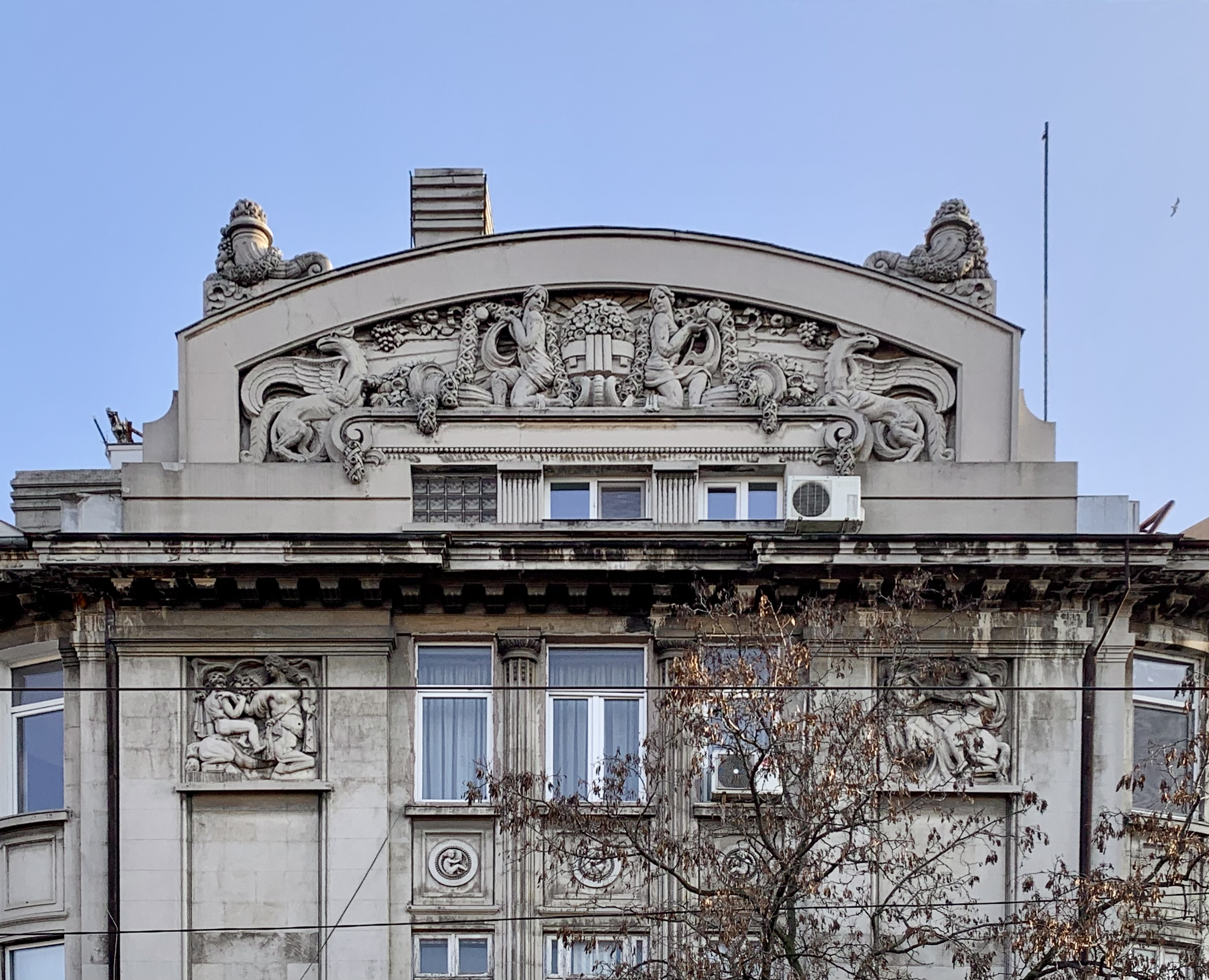
Art Deco cornucopias on the pediment corners of the Mihai Zisman House (Calea Călărașilor no. 44), Bucharest, by architect Soru, 1920

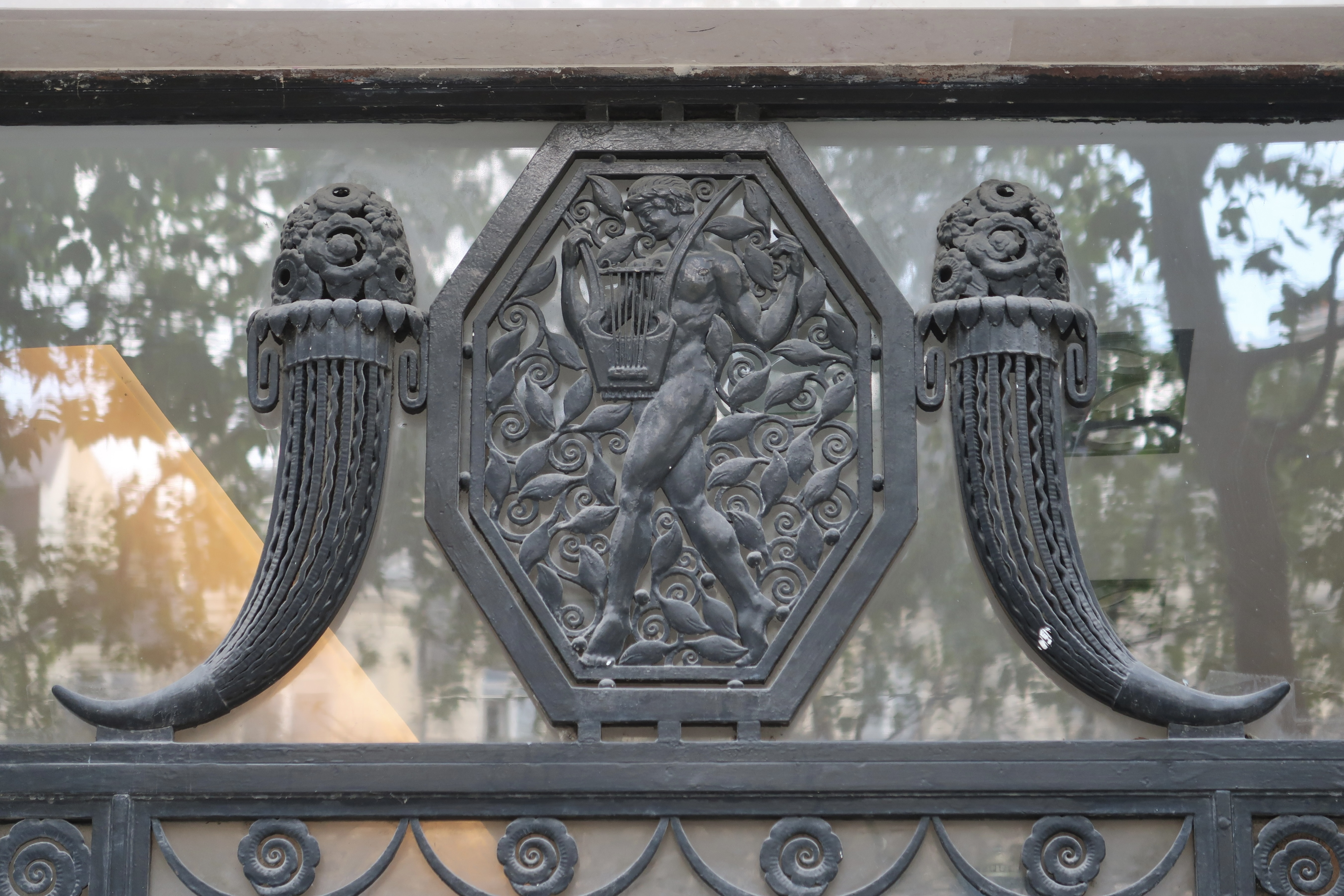
Art Deco cornucopias of Avenue des Champs-Élysées no. 77, Paris, unknown architect, c.1930

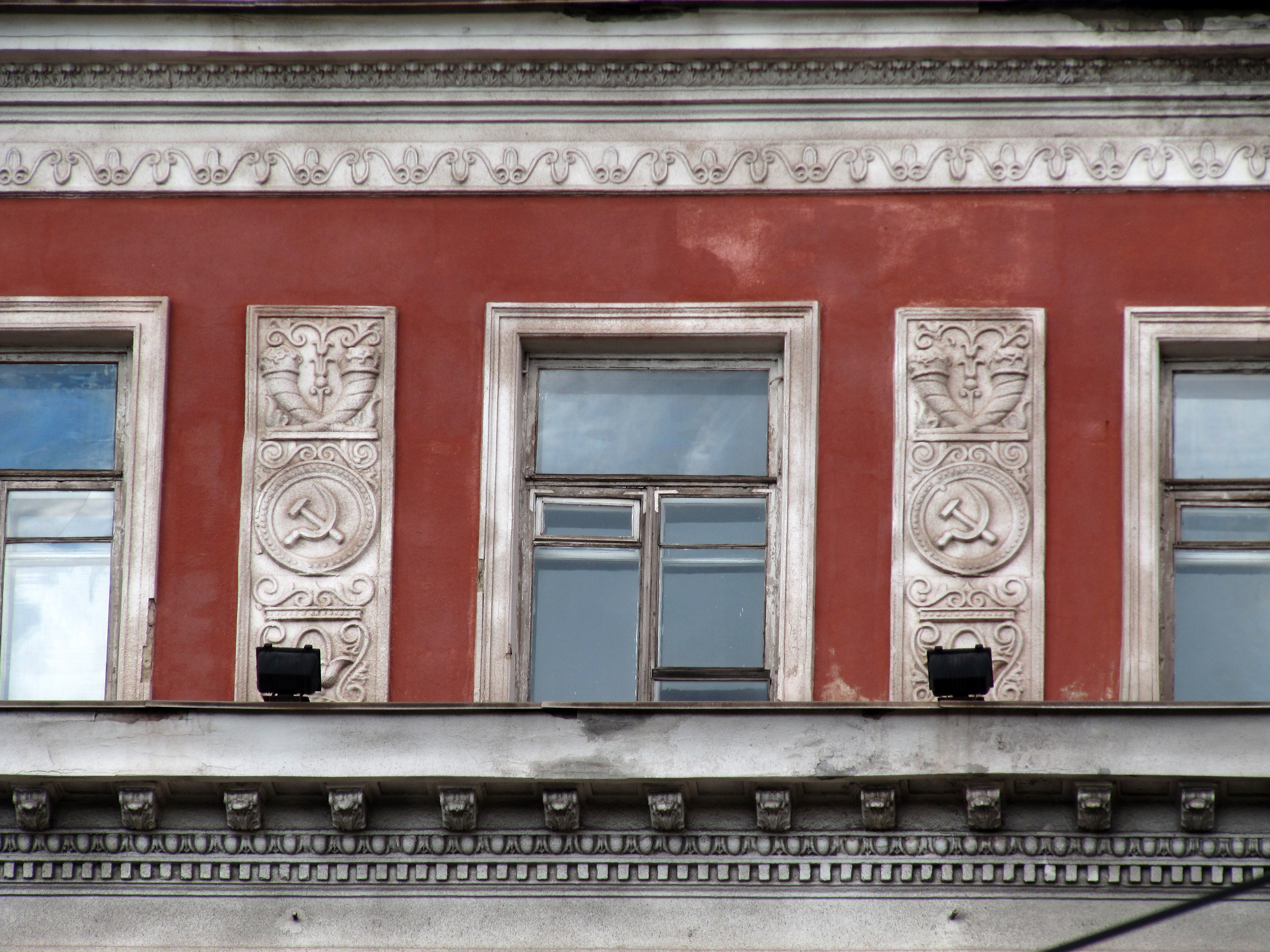
Stalinist cornucopias on the administration building of the "Kryvbasshahtoprohidka" and "Pivdenruda" associations, Kryvyi Rih, Ukraine, unknown architect, 1950s

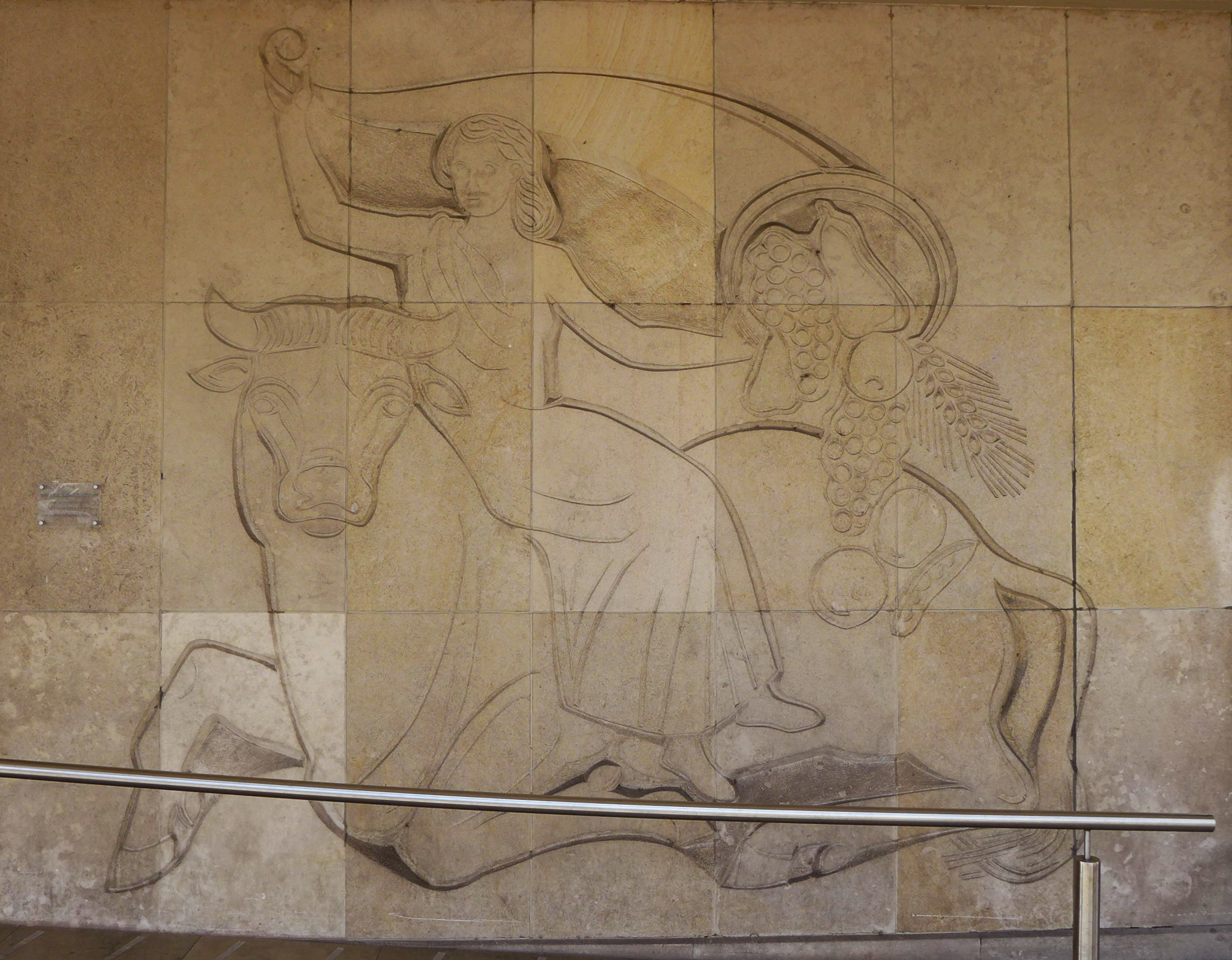
Modernist relief of Europe, forcing the wild bull on its knees and pouring out the cornucopia with the blessings of prosperity, in the Saarlouis Town Hall, Germany, by Nikolaus Simon, 1953-1955

The Coat of arms of Colombia

Coat of arms of Peru

== See also ==
- Akshaya Patra
- Drinking horn
- List of mythological objects
- Venus of Laussel
- Cornucopian
