= Abundantia =

Roman personification of abundance

- Goddess of abundance, money-flow, prosperity, fortune, valuables, and success
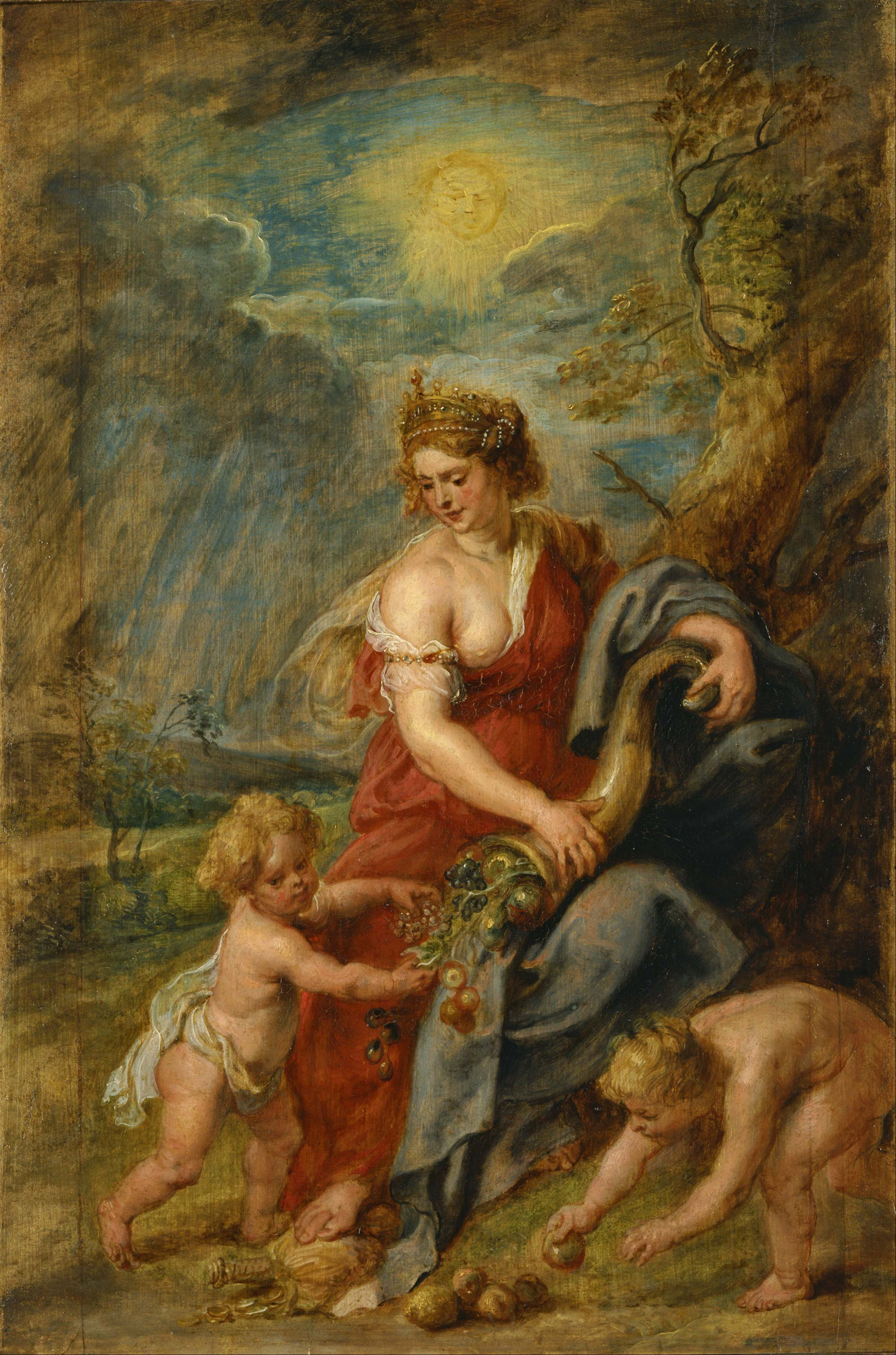
- A painting of Abundantia made by Peter Paul Rubens
- Symbol: Cornucopia

In ancient Roman religion, Abundantia (Latin pronunciation: [abʊnˈdantɪ.a]), also called Copia, was a divine personification of abundance and prosperity; abundantia means "abundance" in Latin. She helped protect savings and investments, and assisted with major purchases. She was among the embodiments of virtues in religious propaganda that cast the emperor as the ensurer of "Golden Age" conditions. Abundantia thus figures in art, cult, and literature, but has little mythology as such. She may have survived in some form in Roman Gaul and medieval France. Abundantia is depicted carrying a cornucopia filled with grain and coins, and was said to occasionally leave gifts from the horn at houses.

== In Rome ==
The Augustan poet Ovid gives Abundantia a role in the myth of Acheloüs the river god, one of whose horns was ripped from his forehead by Hercules. The horn was taken by the naiads and transformed into the cornucopia that was granted to Abundantia. Other aetiological myths provide different explanations of the cornucopia's origin. On Neronian coinage, she was associated with Ceres and equated with Annona, who embodied the grain supply. Like Annona, Abundantia was a "virtue in action" in such locations as the harbor, where grain entered the city. Coinage in Rome depicts her either holding the cornucopia or pouring out the riches contained within the cornucopia. Occasionally she is depicted as holding wheat or standing on a ship. It is unknown what her appearance on ships represents. Abundantia appears on the medals of many emperors, such as Trajan, Antoninus Pius, Caracalla, Elagabalus, Severus Alexander, Gordian, Decius, Gallienus, Tetricus, Probus, Numerian, Carinus, Carus, Diocletian, and Galerius. She appears alongside one of several inscriptions: Abundantia, Abundantia Perpetua, Augustorum Nostrorum, Augustorum Augg NN, and Augustia Aug. Mithraic iconography on a vase from Lezoux, in the Roman province of Gallia Aquitania, depicts this deity seated and holding a cornucopia as a symbol of "the abundance that stems from Mithras' act".

== Possible survivals ==
It has been suggested that the Gallic goddess Rosmerta had a functional equivalence to Abundantia, but the two are never directly identified in inscriptions. William of Auvergne (d. 1249), a bishop of Paris, mentions a Domina Abundia ("Mistress Abundia"), who also appears in the Roman de la Rose as "Dame Habonde." The bishop derives her name from abundantia. At night the dominae enter houses where offerings have been set out for them. They eat and drink from the vessels, but the contents are undiminished. If they are pleased, they bring prosperity and fertility. William regarded these practices as a form of idolatry. Folklorists of the 19th century saw these figures as Celtic fairies.

Nicholas of Cusa reports that on his travels through the French Alps in 1457, he met two old women who told him they were in the service of Domina Abundia. They identified themselves as apostate Christians, and had been imprisoned for witchcraft. Nicholas felt that they had been deluded by the devil, but should be allowed to receive penance rather than burning at the stake.

== Later art and allegory ==
In later Western art, Abundantia is often portrayed holding her cornucopia and sheaves of corn or wheat.

== See also ==
- Fortuna
- Tyche
- 151 Abundantia
