= Barbarian invasions of the third century =

Barbarian invasions against the Roman Empire in the 3rd century

Barbarian invasions of the 3rd century
- Part of the Roman-Germanic wars and the Crisis of the Third Century
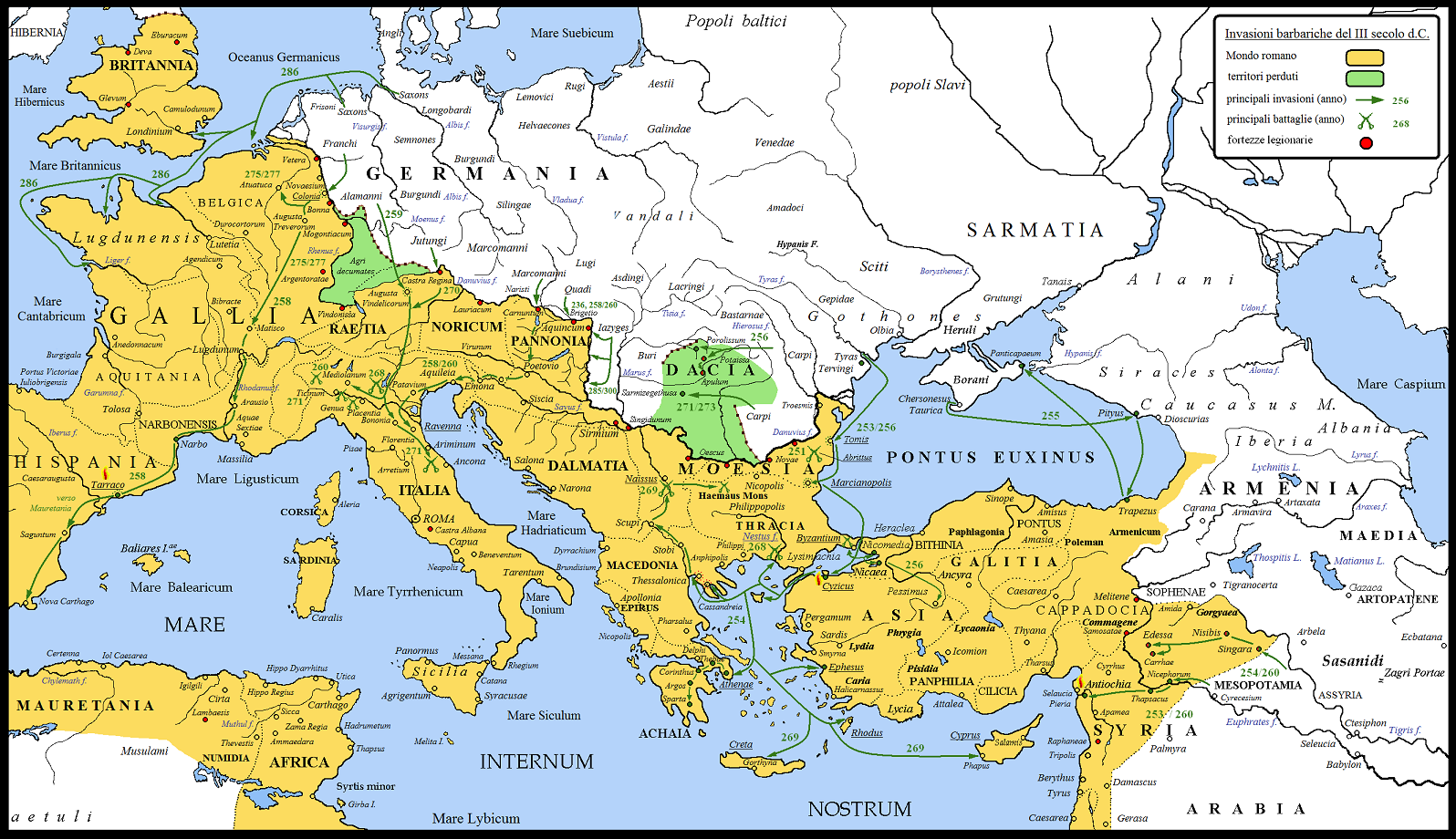
- The barbarian invasions of the 3rd century
Date	212 - 305
Location	Limes Germanicus and Danubian Limes
Result	Raids that subsided after 268

Belligerents
Roman Empire	Germanic and Sarmatian peoples

Commanders and leaders
Caracalla; Severus Alexander; Maximinus Thrax; Gordian III; Philip the Arab; Decius; Trebonianus Gallus; Gallienus, Claudius Gothicus, Aurelian; Marcus Aurelius Probus; Diocletian; Maximian	Cannabaudes of the Goths, Cniva of the Goths, Gabiomarus of the Quadi, Genobaud of the Franks, Igillus of the Burgundians or Vandals, Naulobatus of the Heruli, Ostrogotha of the Goths, Semnon of the Lugii

Strength
At least 23 legions and about 150/200 auxiliary units involved, totaling 200/250,000 armed men	Numerous peoples, amounting to a few hundred thousand armed men

The barbarian invasions of the third century (212–305) constituted an uninterrupted period of raids within the borders of the Roman Empire, conducted for purposes of plunder and booty by armed peoples belonging to populations gravitating along the northern frontiers: Picts, Caledonians, and Saxons in Britain; the Germanic tribes of Frisii, Saxons, Franks, Alemanni, Burgundians, Marcomanni, Quadi, Lugii, Vandals, Juthungi, Gepids and Goths (Tervingi in the west and Greuthungi in the east), the Dacian tribes of the Carpi and the Sarmatian tribes of Iazyges, Roxolani and Alans, as well as Bastarnae, Scythians, Borani and Heruli along the Rhine-Danube rivers and the Black Sea.

Since the time of Marcus Aurelius during the Marcomannic Wars (166/167-189), Germanic-Sarmatian tribes had not exerted such strong pressure along the northern borders of the Roman Empire.

The growing danger to the Roman Empire of Germanic peoples and Sarmatians was mainly due to a change from previous centuries in the tribal structure of their society: the population, constantly growing and driven by the eastern peoples, needed new territories to expand, or else the weaker tribes would become extinct. Hence the need to aggregate into large ethnic federations, such as those of the Alemanni, Franks and Goths, in order to better attack the neighboring Empire or to defend themselves against the irruption of other neighboring barbarian populations. For other scholars, however, in addition to the pressure of outside populations, it was also the contact and confrontation with the Roman imperial civilization (its wealth, language, weapons, and organization) that prompted the Germanic peoples to restructure and organize themselves into more robust and permanent social systems, capable of better defending themselves or seriously attacking the Empire. Rome, for its part, had been trying since the first century A.D. to prevent the penetration of the barbarians by entrenching itself behind the limes, that is, the continuous line of fortifications extended between the Rhine and the Danube and built precisely to contain the pressure of the Germanic peoples.

The breakthrough by the barbarian peoples along the limes was also facilitated by the period of severe internal instability that ran through the Roman Empire during the third century. In Rome, there was a continuous alternation of emperors and usurpers (the so-called military anarchy). Not only did the internal wars unnecessarily consume important resources in the clashes between the various contenders, but – most seriously – they ended up depleting precisely the frontiers subjected to barbarian aggression.

As if this were not enough, along the eastern front of Mesopotamia and Armenia from 224 onward the Persian dynasty of the Parthians had been replaced by that of the Sasanids, which on several occasions severely engaged the Roman Empire, forced to suffer attacks that often joined the less strenuous but nonetheless dangerous invasions carried out along the African front by the Berber tribes of Moors, Baquates, Quinquegentiani, Nobati and Blemmyes. Rome showed that it was in serious difficulty in conducting so many wars at once and almost collapsed two centuries early.

It was also thanks to the subsequent internal and provisional division of the Roman state into three parts (to the west the Empire of Gaul, in the center Italy, Illyricum and African provinces, and to the east the Kingdom of Palmyra) that the Empire managed to save itself from ultimate collapse and dismemberment. However, it was only after the death of Gallienus (268) that a group of emperor-soldiers of Illyrian origin (Claudius Gothicus, Aurelian, and Marcus Aurelius Probus) finally succeeded in reunifying the Empire into a single bloc, even though the civil wars that had been going on for about fifty years and the barbarian invasions had forced the Romans to give up both the region of the Agri decumates (left to the Alemanni in about 260) and the province of Dacia (256-271), which had been subjected to incursions by the Dacian population of the Carpi, the Tervingi Goths, and the Iazigi Sarmatians.

The invasions of the third century, according to tradition, began with the first incursion conducted by the Germanic confederation of the Alemanni in 212 under Emperor Caracalla and ended in 305 at the time of Diocletian's abdication for the benefit of the new Tetrarchy system.

== Historical context ==
After about thirty years of relative quiet along the Rhine-Danubian frontiers, a new crisis broke out along the Germanic-Rhaetian Limes in 212, caused by the first invasion of the Alemanni confederation.

=== The Germanic world between the 2nd and 3rd centuries ===
In Central and Eastern Europe, the barbarian world was shaken by strong internal unrest and migratory movements of populations that tended to change the balance with the neighboring Roman Empire. These peoples, seeking new territories in which to settle due to the increasing population growth in ancient Germania, were also attracted by the wealth and affluent life of the Roman world.

Fifty years earlier, on the fringes of the Germanic area, along the Danubian and Carpathian frontier, there had been movement and mixing of peoples, with the advent of a new phenomenon among the Germans, which represented an overcoming of the tribal dimension: entire peoples (such as Marcomanni, Quadi and Naristi, Vandals, Cotini, Iazigi, Buri, etc.), had grouped together in coalitions, mostly military in nature, implementing greater pressure on the nearby Roman limes.

Under Caracalla the phenomenon of aggregation had evolved further, going so far as to establish in the area of the Agri decumates some real ethnic confederations of tribes: the Alemanni, who aggregated Catti, Naristi, Hermunduri and part of the Semnones and positioned themselves on the upper Rhine from Mogontiacum to the Danube near Castra Regina; the Franks, on the lower Rhine from the mouth of the river to Bonn; and the Saxons, composed of the seafaring peoples between the mouths of the Weser and Elbe rivers.

At the same time the thrust of the East Germans from Scandinavia also increased, such as the Goths (in the various branches of the Ostrogoths, Visigoths, and Heruli), who came from the Vistula: they had been slowly moving southeastward for more than fifty years, and had now come close to the northern shores of the Black Sea. In that region they came into conflict with the Sarmatian peoples of Roxolani and Alans. Also from the Silesian-Vistula region came two other major populations: the Vandals, who had already come into contact with the Roman legions of Pannonia and Dacia Porolissensis at the time of the Marcomannic wars under Marcus Aurelius, and the Burgundians, who were heading westward toward the rivers Elbe and Main.

=== Prelude to the invasions of the 3rd century: the Marcomannic Wars (166-189) ===
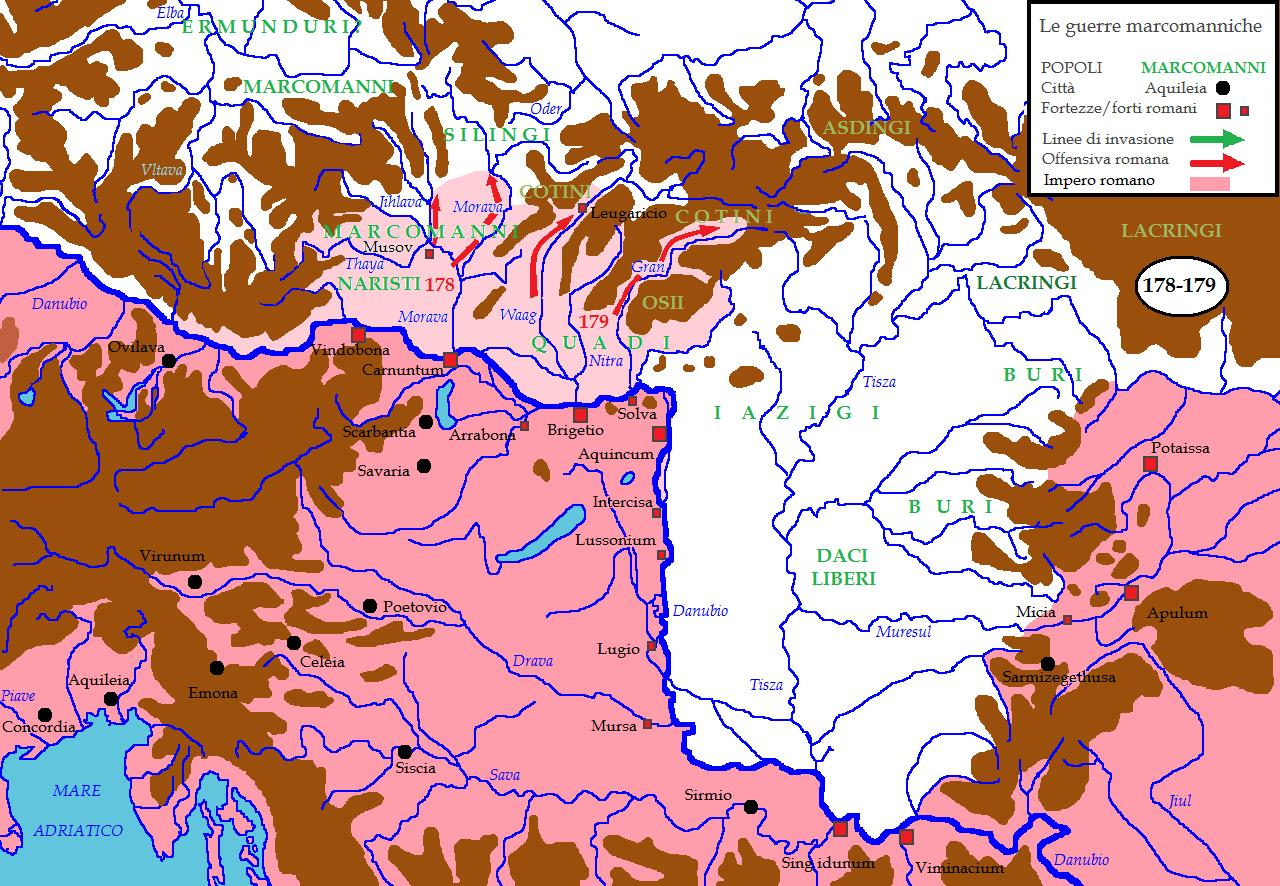
The climax of the Marcomannic wars in the years 178-179.

In 166/167, the first clash occurred along the Pannonian frontiers by a few bands of marauding Lombards and Osii, which, due to the prompt intervention of the border troops, were promptly repelled. The peace stipulated with the neighboring Germanic peoples north of the Danube was handled directly by the emperors themselves, Marcus Aurelius and Lucius Verus, who were now wary of the barbarian aggressors and traveled for these reasons as far as distant Carnuntum (in 168). The untimely death of Lucius (in 169 not far from Aquileia), and the breaking of pacts by the barbarians (many of whom had been "clients" since the time of Tiberius) led a never-before-seen wave of troops to swarm devastatingly through northern Italy all the way to below the walls of Aquileia, the heart of Venetia. The impression caused was enormous: it was since the time of Marius that a barbarian population had not laid siege to centers in northern Italy.

Marcus Aurelius fought a long and exhausting war against the barbarian populations, first repelling them and "cleaning up" the territories of Cisalpine Gaul, Noricum, and Rhaetia (170-171), then counterattacking with a massive offensive in Germanic territory, which took several years of fighting, until 175. These events forced the emperor to reside for several years along the Pannonian front, never returning to Rome. However, the truce signed with these peoples, particularly the Marcomanni, Quadi and Iazyges, lasted only a couple of years. By the end of 178 the emperor Marcus Aurelius was forced to return to the castrum of Brigetio from where, in the following spring of 179, the last campaign was conducted. The death of the Roman emperor in 180 soon put an end to Roman expansionist plans and resulted in the abandonment of the occupied territories of Marcomannia and the making of new treaties with the "client" peoples northeast of the Middle Danube.

== Forces in the field: along the Rhine and Danube European front ==
Numerous were the legionary and auxiliary forces fielded during this period by the Roman Empire. The numbers are difficult to estimate, since in the course of the century some units were destroyed and replaced with new ones; moreover, when Diocletian's new tetrarchical system took over, it was the overall strategic organization itself that changed.

=== Romans ===
In the 3rd century the Roman Empire deployed numerous legions against barbarian invasions: I Adiutrix, I Illyricorum (recruited under Aurelian), I Italica, I Maximiana (under Maximian), I Minervia, I Pontica (under Diocletian), II Adiutrix, II Italica, legio II Parthica, III Italica, IIII Flavia, IIII Italica (under Alexander Severus), V Macedonica, VII Claudia, VIII Augusta, X Gemina, XI Claudia Pia Fidelis, XIII Gemina, Legio XIIII Gemina Martia Victrix, XV Apollinaris, XX Valeria Victrix, XXII Primigenia and XXX Ulpia Victrix. The total forces fielded by the Roman Empire may have exceeded 200 to 250,000 armed men from the beginning to the end of the third century; of these, one half were legionaries, the remainder auxiliaries.

At the death of Caracalla in 217 out of 33 legions along the entire system of imperial fortifications, as many as 16 were along the Rhenish and Danubian limes (accounting for 48.5% of the total), as well as 2 others in the rear as "strategic reserve" (in Hispania and Italy), as is highlighted below in the summary table on their deployment (in 217):

No. of legionary fortresses under Caracalla	Legionary unit	Ancient location	Modern location	Roman province
1	Legio XXX Ulpia Victrix	Vetera	Xanten	Germania Inferior
2	Legio I Minervia	Bonna	Bonn	Germania Inferior
3	Legio XXII Primigenia	Mogontiacum	Mainz	Germania Superior
4	Legio VIII Augusta	Argentoratum	Strasbourg	Germania Superior
5	Legio III Italica	Castra Regina	Ratisbona	Raetia
6	Legio II Italica	Lauriacum	Enns	Noricum
7	Legio X Gemina	Vindobona	Vienna	Pannonia Superior
8	Legio XIV Gemina	Carnuntum	Altenburg-Petronell	Pannonia Superior
9	Legio I Adiutrix	Brigetio	Komárom	Pannonia Inferior
10	Legio II Adiutrix	Aquincum	Budapest	Pannonia Inferior
11	Legio IIII Flavia Felix	Singidunum	Belgrade	Moesia Superior
12	Legio VII Claudia	Viminacium	Kostolac	Moesia Superior
13	Legio XIII Gemina	Apulum	Alba Iulia	Three Dacias
14	Legio V Macedonica	Potaissa	Turda	Three Dacias
15	Legio I Italica	Novae	Svištov	Moesia Inferior
16	Legio XI Claudia	Durostorum	Silistra	Moesia Inferior
Strategic reserve	Legio II Parthica	Castra Albana	Albano Laziale	Italy
Strategic reserve	Legio VII Gemina	Legio	León	Hispania

A little less than a century later, during Diocletian's Tetrarchic period, the number of legions placed along the northern front (Rhine and Danube) was increased to 24, in addition to the 3 positioned to guard the Alps (legio Iulia Alpina, legio II Iulia Alpina, and legio III Iulia Alpina), out of a combined total of 56 (or 48.2%), as highlighted below:

No. of legionary fortresses under tetrarchy	Legionary unit	Ancient location	Modern location	Roman province
1	Legio XXX Ulpia Victrix	Vetera	Xanten	Germania Secunda
2	Legio I Minervia	Bonna	Bonn	Germania Secunda
3; 4	Legio XXII Primigenia and Legio VI Gallicana	Mogontiacum	Mainz	Germania Prima
5	Legio VIII Augusta	Argentoratae	Strasbourg	Germania Prima
6	Legio I Martia (?)	Castrum Rauracense (?)	Kaiseraugst	Maxima Sequanorum
7	Legio III Italica	Castra Regina	Ratisbona	Raetia
8	Legio III Herculea	Caelius Mons	Kellmünz an der Iller	Raetia
9	Legio II Italica	Lauriacum	Enns	Noricum Ripensis
10	Legio I Noricorum	Ad Iuvense	Ybbs?	Noricum Ripensis
11	Legio X Gemina	Vindobona	Vienna	Pannonia Prima
12	Legio XIV Gemina	Carnuntum	Altenburg-Petronell	Pannonia Prima
13	Legio I Adiutrix	Brigetio	Komárom	Pannonia Valeria
14	Legio II Adiutrix	Aquincum	Budapest	Pannonia Valeria
15	Legio VI Herculea	Ad Militare	Batina	Pannonia Secunda
16	Legio V Iovia	Bononia	Banoštor	Pannonia Secunda
17	Legio IIII Flavia Felix	Singidunum	Belgrade	Moesia Prima
18	Legio VII Claudia	Viminacium	Kostolac	Moesia Prima
19	Legio XIII Gemina	Ratiaria	Archar	Dacia Ripensis
20	Legio V Macedonica	Oescus	Pleven	Dacia Ripensis
21	Legio I Italica	Novae	Svištov	Moesia Secunda
22	Legio XI Claudia	Durostorum	Silistra	Moesia Secunda
23	Legio II Herculia	Troesmis	Iglita	Scythia Minor
24	Legio I Iovia	Noviodunum	Isaccea	Scythia Minor
25; 26; 27	legio I Iulia Alpina legio II Iulia Alpina legio III Iulia Alpina	Claustra Alpium Iuliarum	Alpine passes	Italia
Strategic reserve	Legio VII Gemina	Legio	León	Gallaecia

=== Barbarians ===
Concerning the massive forces that the barbarians were able to field in the course of the invasions of the 3rd century, it is briefly summarized below as follows:

Size of the German-Sarmatian hordes in the 3rd century
Date	Total number of armed men	Peoples involved	Warships	Location
248	more than 60,000	Goths, Taifals, Hasdingi and Carpi		Moesia and Thrace
249	more than 70,000	Goths and Carpi		Dacia, Moesia and Thrace
267-268	320,000	Peucini, Greuthungi, Ostrogoths, Tervingi, Visigoths, Gepids, Celts and Heruli	2,000/6,000 ships	Moesia, Thrace, Greece and Asia Minor
269	more than 50,000	Goths		Moesia, Thrace and Macedonia
277-278	more than 400,000 barbarians killed	Franks, Lugii, Burgundians and Vandals		Gaul and Raetia
281	100,000 people settled	Bastarnae		Thrace
283	16,000 killed and 20,000 captured	Sarmatians		Pannonias
298	60,000			Limes Germanicus

== Invasions ==
=== Northern front: from the Rhine to the Danube and to the Black Sea ===
==== First phase: the attacks during the Severan dynasty (212-235) ====
Caracalla: Denarius
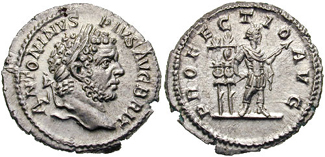
First side of the image: AD ANTONINVS PIVS AVG BRIT, laureate head toward right;
Second side of the image: Profectio AVG, Caracalla standing, holding a spear; behind him two military banners.
2.74 g, coin probably minted when Caracalla had succeeded his father, after the death of his brother Geta, sometime between 212 and 213. It celebrates here the Profectio of the Emperor leaving for a military campaign to the northern front.

212
After about forty years, the Germanic Catti returned to break through the Roman limes; the Alemanni were mentioned for the first time, in the Wetterau.

213
Caracalla, who arrived in the spring of that year along the Germanic-Rhaetian limes, led a campaign against the Germans, defeating first the Catti along the Main River, then the Alemanni in the area from Rhaetia to the plateau of Swabia. As a result of these victories, the young emperor assumed the appellation Germanicus maximus (October 6; rephrased as "Alemannicus" by later historiography). However, he seems to have bought peace with the barbarians, as Cassius Dio suggests.

Also belonging to this period are a number of inscriptions by a Dacian interpreter, found at Brigetio, which seem to follow possible punitive expeditions against the free Dacians of Banat, included between Lower Pannonia in the west and Dacia in the east. Furthermore, two other incursions into Dacia and Lower Pannonia, along the Danubian stretch around Aquincum, by Carpi and Vandals, would also be dated to the same year.

214
In the spring of this year, Caracalla departed for the Danubian front (after an illness that had immobilized him throughout the winter), with Pannonia as his destination, where, at the beginning of the year or perhaps already at the end of the previous one, new incursions had occurred between Brigetio and Aquincum by Quadi and Sarmatian Iazyges. The emperor, in the aftermath of these events and in an attempt to try to keep the client situation along the Danube intact, on the one hand succeeded in shielding himself from the Marcomanni by pitting them against the neighboring Vandals who had been proving particularly hostile for some time, but on the other he was forced to execute the king of the Quadi, Gabiomarus, because of the resistance that had been created by this people, who had been allies of the Romans since the time of Marcus Aurelius but had recently turned against Roman power, invading the two Pannonias at the beginning of the year. Caracalla eventually succeeded in defeating even the Iazigians, who were allied with the Quadi and Vandals, assuming the appellation of "Sarmaticus," as recounted in the biography of his brother Geta. Herodian also recounts that Caracalla at the end of these wars:

Caracalla defeated the Germans north of the Limes and obtained legality and friendship from them, so much so that he dressed his auxiliary troops like them and created with them his own personal bodyguard with selected men of great strength and good looks.[...] He also used to use an elaborate blond wig so as to appear with a Germanic type of hairstyle. The barbarians by this were pleased and adored him.

— Herodian, History of the Empire after Marcus Aurelius, IV, 7.3-4.

As a result of these events, Lower Pannonia was expanded: it now included the legionary fortress of Brigetio, so that each of the two Pannonias could have two legions, while the civilian centers of Carnuntum (Colonia Septimia Aurelia Antoniana) and Brigetio itself were elevated to colonies.

215
Caracalla, having arrived in Dacia, after inspecting the entire Pannonian limes, succeeded in repelling the first invasion of Goths and Carpi, assuming for these victories the appellation "Goticus."

219-220
Emperor Heliogabalus was preparing a military expedition against the Marcomanni, as an oracle had told him that this war would be carried out by a member of his dynasty: this news seems to suggest the presence of new barbarian infiltrations along the borders of Upper Pannonia and a subsequent Roman counteroffensive. Heliogabalus may have been the last of the Severan dynasty capable of maintaining fortifications across the Danube, such as Celemantia.

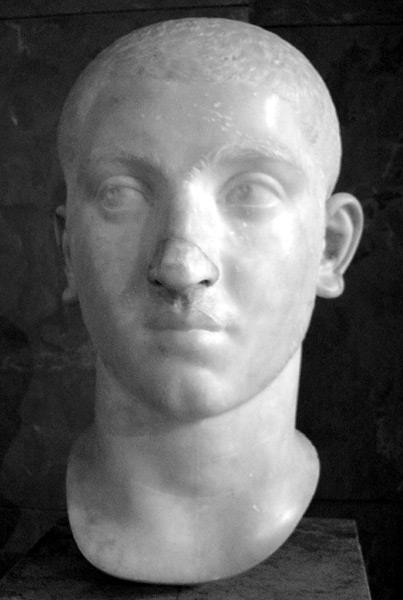
Bust of Alexander Severus.

225
the coinage of Alexander Severus celebrates a Victoria Augusta, most likely over the Germans or Sarmatians of the Danubian limes.

227/228
Under the reign of Alexander Severus, the Iazyges brought a new incursion along the Lower Pannonian limes, as would also be apparent from the coinage of the period.

230
The Roman garrison of the Kingdom of the Cimmerian Bosporus (composed of vexillationes of the I Italica), in present-day Crimea, was massacred by the Borans, while the Goths, who had pushed as far as the Black Sea coast, managed to occupy the city of Olbia (near modern Odesa), in Roman hands since the time of Nero, which was defended by the governor of the province of Lower Moesia.

231-232
The Lower Pannonian limes suffered new attacks by the Iazigians. In repelling this new incursion, the intervention of the future emperor Marcus Clodius Pupienus Maximus was decisive.

233
The Noricum limes, between Wachau and Wienerwald in the Tullnerfeld area, and the Germanic-Rhaetian limes were heavily attacked by the Alemanni. The defense of this stretch of limes may have been entrusted precisely to the future emperor Pupienus, who again reported success against the barbarians. Remarkable are the archaeological evidences of the destruction reported in these provinces during the raids, from Castra Regina to Pfünz to Augusta Treverorum (today Trier).

234-235
Alexander Severus, who left Rome for the northern front, after enlisting numerous new auxiliary troops (including Armenians, Osroenes, and even Parthians,) succeeded in repelling the raids of the Alemanni, who had broken through the Agri Decumates front. However, the emperor made the mistake of wanting to conclude a peace treaty with the Germans, offering them large sums of money: this attitude was badly received by his army, which, under the leadership of General Maximinus the Thracian, rebelled and slaughtered Alexander and his mother. Shortly afterwards the legions proclaimed Maximinus as the new Roman emperor.

==== Second phase: military anarchy and the repeated breakthroughs of the northern limes (235-253) ====
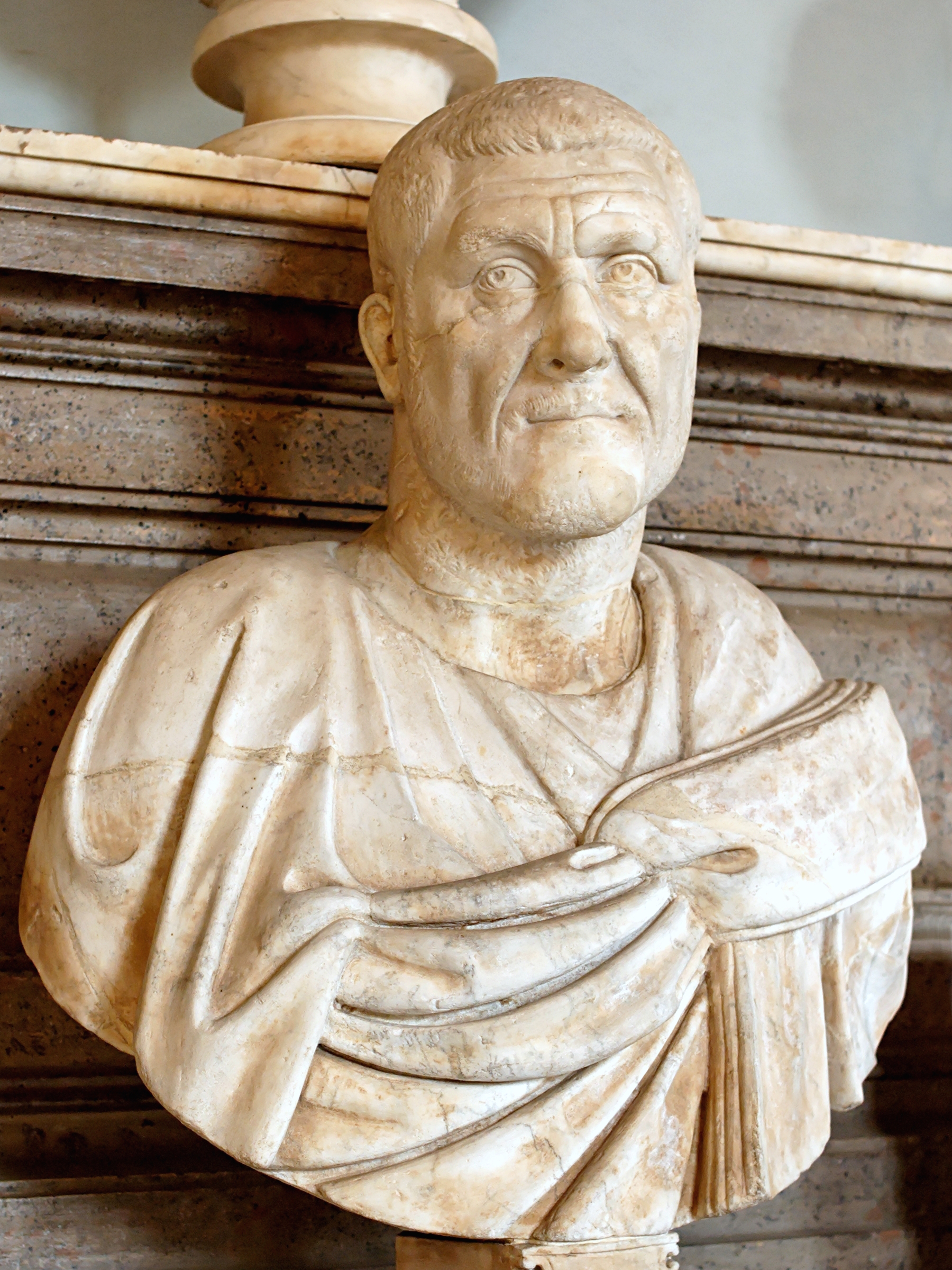
With Emperor Maximinus Thrace began the turbulent period of military anarchy, which would end only fifty years later with Diocletian.

The pressure of the barbarians along the northern frontiers and the simultaneous pressure of the Sasanians in the East had not only intensified but had spread the feeling that the empire was totally encircled by its enemies. The tools of traditional diplomacy, used since the time of Augustus and based on the threat of the use of force and the fomenting of internal dissensions among the various hostile tribes to keep them engaged against each other, were now proving ineffective. Immediate recourse to force was necessary, deploying tactically superior armies capable of intercepting every possible avenue of invasion by the barbarians as quickly as possible; however, the strategy was made difficult by having to garrison immense stretches of frontier with mostly sparse military contingents. Many of the emperors who were gradually proclaimed by the legions over a period of twenty-five years did not even manage to set foot in Rome, let alone, during their very short reigns, undertake internal reforms, as they were permanently occupied with defending the imperial throne from other claimants and the territory from external enemies.

235-236
Maximinus Thrax, who believed it was a priority of the Empire to wage "anti-Germanic" warfare, continued to fight the Alemanni, succeeding not only in repelling their incursions along the Germanic-Rhaetian limes, but also in penetrating deeply into Germania for some 300-400 Roman miles (450-600 kilometers) and beating the Alemannic armies on their own ground, in the region of Württemberg and Baden. Archaeological excavation campaigns, conducted from 2008 to 2011, revealed traces of a military confrontation between the Roman army (also composed of Legio IV Flavia Felix) and the Germans at the Harzhorn, in the wooded area near Kalefeld (in Lower Saxony), dating to 235.

[Maximinus] went through Germania with the entire army and troops of Moors, Osroenes, and Parthians, as well as all the others that Alexander had brought with him for the military campaign. And the main reason he took the eastern auxiliary troops with him was that no one was worth more in combat against the Germans than lightly armed archers. Alexander also had an admirable war apparatus, to which Maximinus is said to have added many new devices. He entered Trans-Renan Germania for three hundred or four hundred miles of the barbarian territory, burned villages, raided cattle, plundered, killed many of the barbarians, generated considerable booty to his soldiers, took numerous prisoners, and if the Germans had not retreated to the swamps and forests, would have subdued all of Germania to Rome.

— Historia Augusta - The two Maximinians, 11.7-9 and 12.1.

A number of archaeological vestiges would belong to this campaign, testifying to the devastation carried out along the Noricum limes as well. For these reasons he received the appellation "Germanicus maximus" from the Senate, while the words "Victoria Germanica" appear on coins.

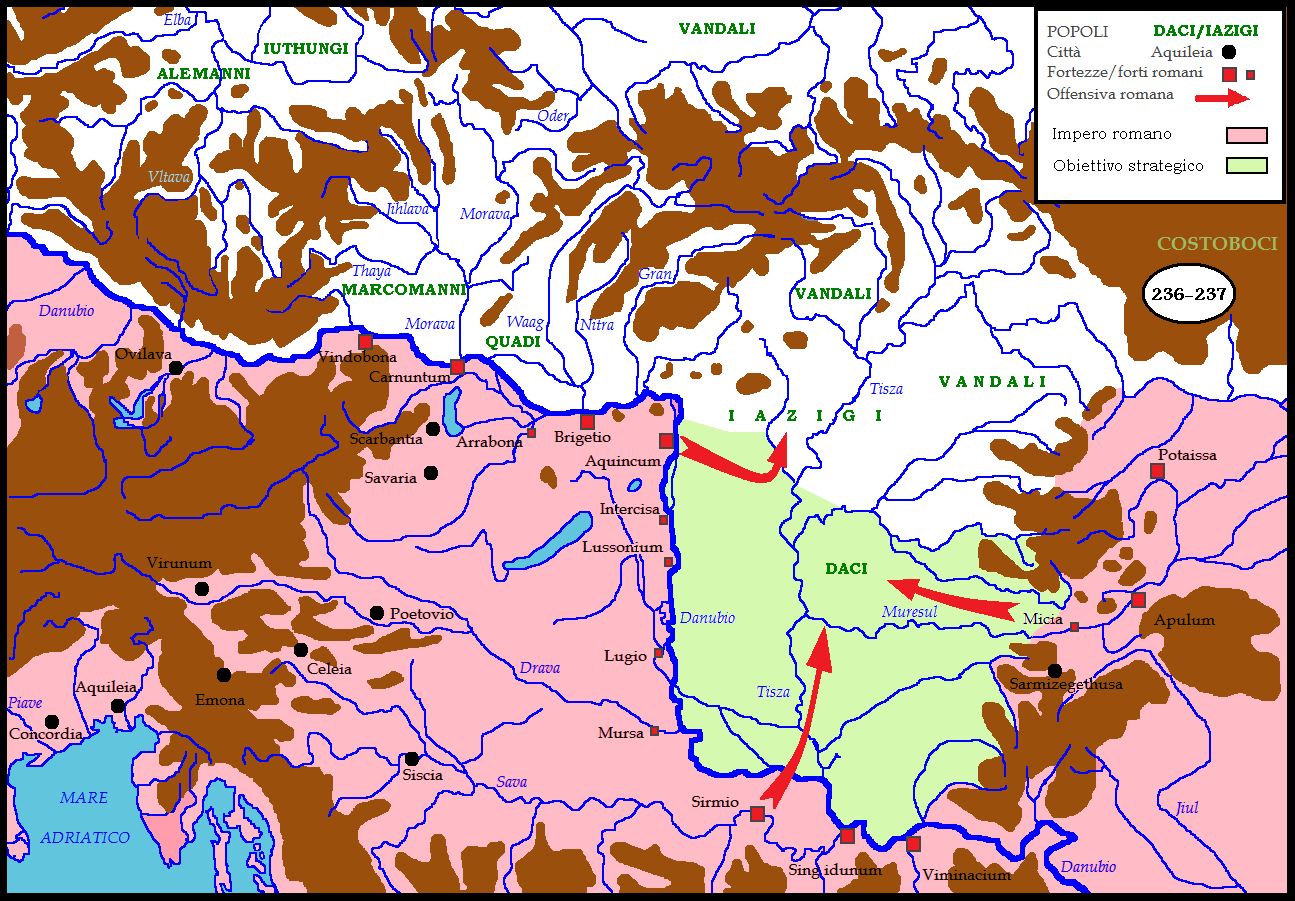
The military operations of Maximinus the Thracian in Sarmatia, against Iazyges and free Dacians.

236-237
Maximinus Thrax, once the Germanic-Rhaetic sector was pacified, led new campaigns against the Iazigi Sarmatians of the Tisza plain, who had tried to cross the Danube after about fifty years of peace along their borders. He had a dream: that of emulating the great Marcus Aurelius and conquering free Germania Magna. His headquarters were placed at Sirmium, in the center of the Lower Pannonian and Dacian front. Historia Augusta reports thus:

Having completed his campaigns in Germania [against the Alemanni], Maximinus went to Sirmium, preparing an expedition against the Sarmatians, and planning to subdue to Rome the northern regions as far as the Ocean.

— Historia Augusta - The two Maximinians, 13.3.

At the end of these operations Maximinus was given the appellation first "Dacicus maximus" and then "Sarmaticus maximus."
During 236, an incursion by Carpi and Goths was repelled, culminating in a victorious battle for the Roman armies in front of Histropolis. This could mean that, around this date, the Goths had already occupied the area of free Dacia north of the Carpathians to the mouth of the Danube and the Black Sea coast, including the cities of Olbia and Tyras.

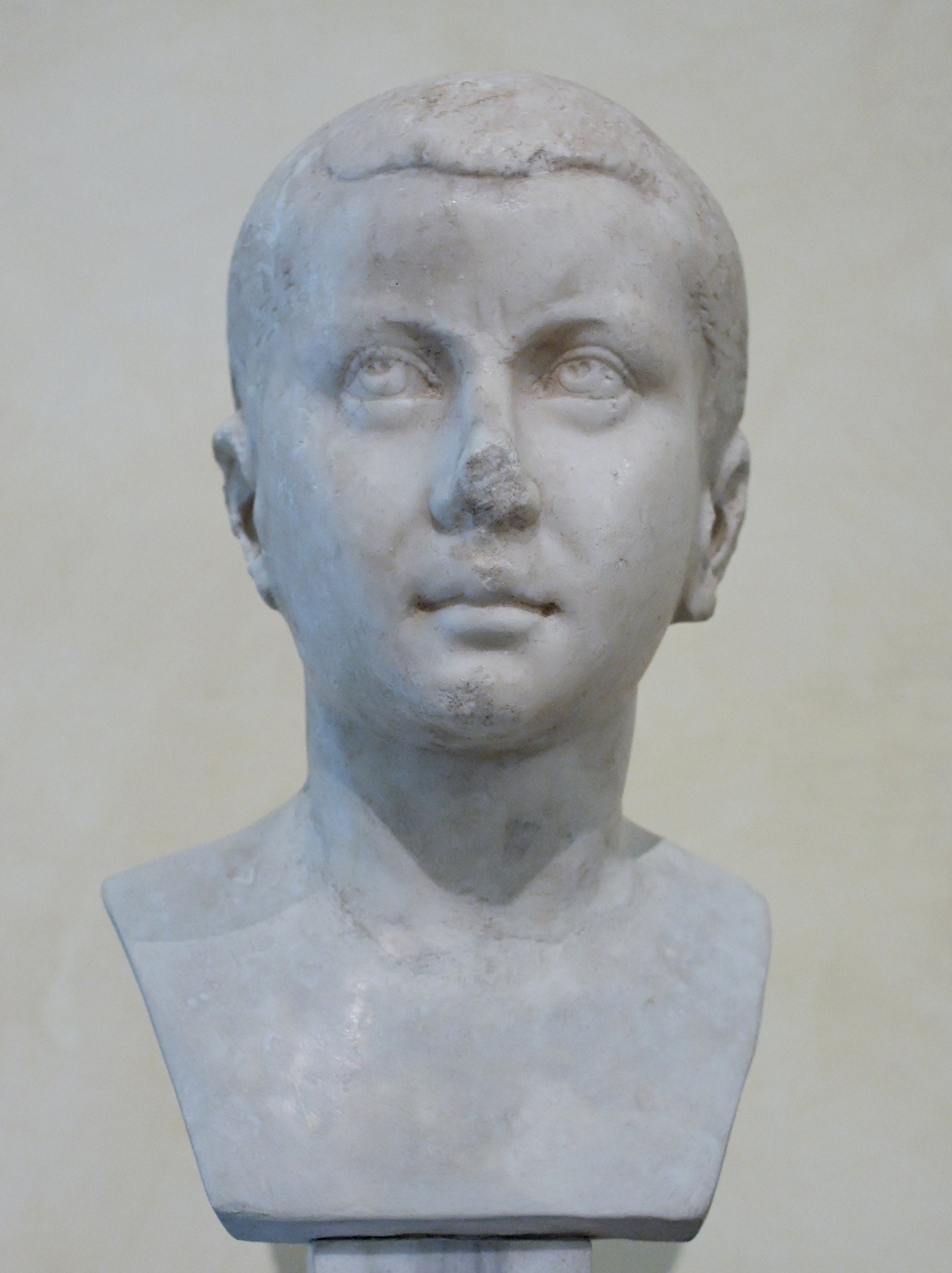
Bust of Gordian III at the Capitoline Museums.

238
A new incursion by the Goths, who had crossed the lower reaches of the Danube, was met by Emperor Decimus Celius Calvinus Balbinus. This incursion saw the barbarians sack and exterminate the population of Histropolis, while the tribe of Dacian lineage, the Carpi, crossed the Danube further upstream, still along the borders of Lower Moesia. The provincial governor, Tullius Menophilus, managed to deal with the Goths by offering them a subsidy in exchange for the return of previously captured prisoners, while he succeeded in repelling the Carpi, having gathered a substantial army.

242-243
Under the young Gordian III, the praetorian prefect Timesitheus succeeded in beating back a coalition of Carpi, Goths, and Sarmatians along the frontiers of Lower Moesia. The Historia Augusta narrates:

Gordian left for war against the Sasanian Persians with a large army and such a large amount of gold that he could easily defeat the enemy either with legionaries or auxiliaries. He marched through Moesia and, in the course of his advance, destroyed, put to flight, and drove away all the enemies who were in Thrace.

— Historia Augusta - Gordian III, 26.3-4.

Also in these years, during Gordian III's eastern campaigns, new breakthroughs of the Germanic-Rhaetian Limes by the Alemanni may have occurred, as some archaeological finds near the fort of Künzing would indicate.

Philip the Arab: antoninianus
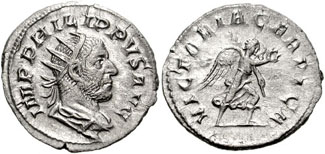
First side of the image: IMP PHILIPPVS AVG, head with crown, wearing breastplate;
Second side of the image: VICTORIA CARPICA, Victoria advancing to the right, holding a palm and a laurel wreath.
23 mm, 4.35 g, coined in c. 245.

245-247
The Carpi of free Dacia resumed raids across the Danube into the territory of Lower Moesia, where neither Severianus nor the provincial governor could stop the invaders. At the end of the first year of the war, Emperor Philip the Arab had to intervene, who in 246 reported a great success against the Germanic peoples of the Quadi along the Pannonian front, as a result of which he was given the appellation "Germanicus maximus." In 247, the Roman offensive resumed along the Lower Danubian front against the Carpi, to the extent that he was given new honors and the appellation "Carpicus maximus."

It is precisely to this period that would belong the establishment of a general and centralized military command for the entire frontier of the middle and lower Danube, which was to include, therefore, the provinces of Lower Pannonia, Upper and Lower Mesia, as well as the Three Daciae, in Sirmium. Tiberius Claudius Marinus Pacatianus was placed at the head of this military district.

248
A new incursion of Goths, who had been refused the annual contribution promised by Gordian III, and of Carpi, their associates, again brought devastation to the province of Lower Moesia.

Under the empire of that Philip [...] the Goths displeased that tribute was no longer paid to them, turned into enemies from the friends they were. For although they lived under their kings in a remote region, they were federates of the empire and received an annual contribution. [...] Ostrogotha crossed the Danube with his men and began ravaging Moesia and Thrace, while Philip sent against him Senator Decius. The latter reporting no success, dismissed his soldiers sending them back to their homes and returning to Philip [...]. Ostrogotha, king of the Goths, [shortly thereafter and again] marched against the Romans at the head of thirty thousand armed men, to whom were also added Taifal warriors, Hasdingi, and three thousand Carpi, the latter a very warlike people and often fatal to the Romans.

— Jordanes, De origine actibusque Getarum, XVI, 1-3.

The invasion was thus eventually stopped by Philip the Arab's general, Decius Trajan, the future emperor, at the city of Marcianopolis, which had been under siege for a long time. The surrender was also made possible by a still rudimentary technique on the part of the Germans with regard to siege machines and, as Jordanes suggests, "by the sum paid to them by the inhabitants."

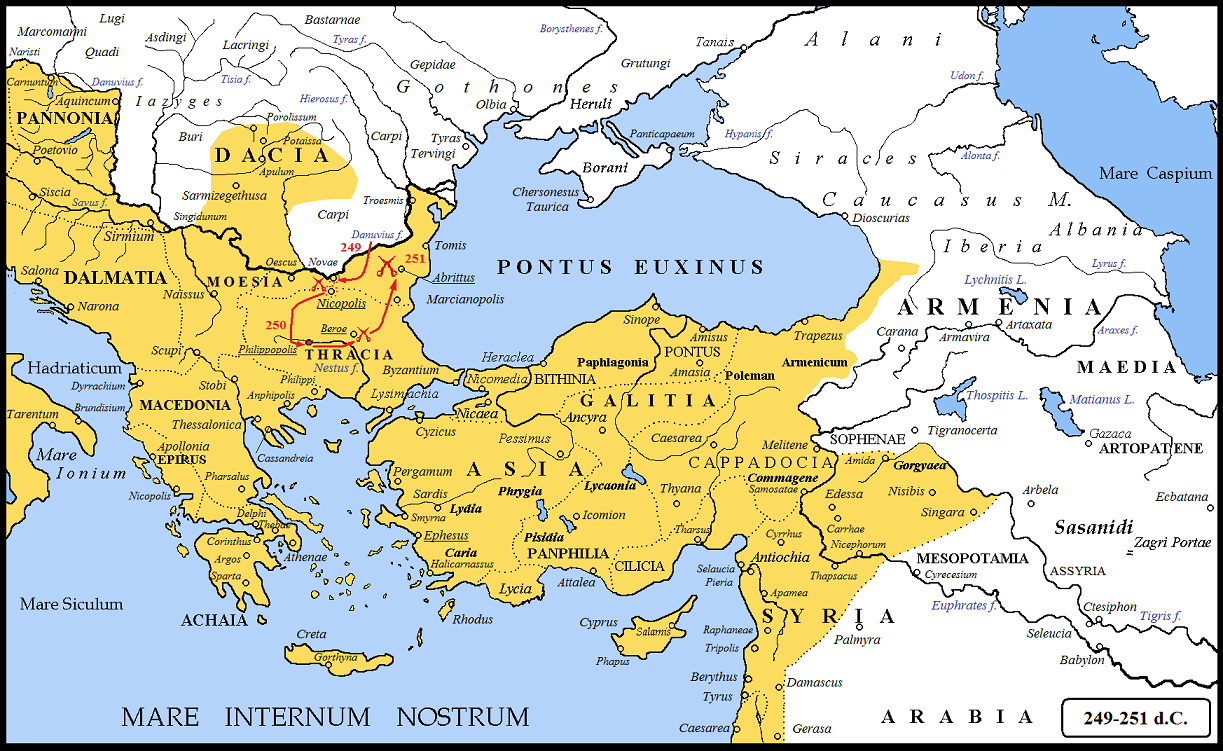
Invasions of Cniva's Carpi and Goths in the years 249-251.

249
Decius, proclaimed emperor by the Pannonian-Moesian armies, headed for Italy, taking most of the border troops with him, and near Verona he succeeded in defeating the army of Philip the Arab, who died along with his son. However, having depleted the defenses of the Balkan area once again allowed the Goths and Carpi to swarm into the provinces of Dacia, Lower Moesia and Thrace. The Goths, having crossed the frozen Danube, divided into two marching columns. The first horde pushed into Thrace as far as Philippopolis (present-day Plovdiv), where they besieged the governor Titus Julius Priscus; the second, more numerous (as many as seventy thousand men are reported) and commanded by Cniva, pushed into Lower Moesia, as far as below the walls of Novae.

250
Decius was forced to return to the lower Danube frontier to face the invasion accomplished the previous year by Cniva's Goths. This was a horde of hitherto unseen size, coordinated moreover with the Carpi who attacked the province of Dacia. Cniva, repelled by Trebonianus Gallus near Novae, led his armies under the walls of Nicopolis. Meanwhile, Decius, having learned of the difficult situation in which the entire Balkan-Danubian front found itself, decided to rush in personally: he defeated and repelled the Carpi from the Dacian province, which is why the emperor was given the epithets of "Dacicus maximus," and "Restitutor Daciarum" ("Restorer of Dacia").

Decius: antoninianus
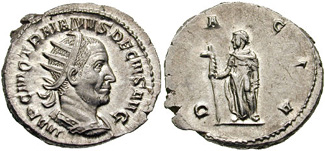
First side of the image: IMP C M Q TRAIANVS DECIVS AVG, head with crown, wearing breastplate;
Second side of the image: D-ACIA, Dacia standing, holding a stick with a donkey-shaped end.
4.99 g, coined in 250.

The emperor was now determined to bar the way back to the Goths in Thrace and to annihilate them so that they could not again regroup and launch new future attacks, as Zosimus narrates. Leaving Trebonius Gallus in Novae, on the Danube, he managed to surprise and defeat Cniva while the latter was still besieging the Mesic city of Nicopolis. However, the barbarian hordes managed to get away and, after crossing the entire Balkan Peninsula, attacked the city of Philippopolis. Nevertheless, Decius, determined to pursue them, suffered a bitter defeat near Beroe Augusta Traiana (present-day Stara Zagora).

Decius, with the purpose of relieving the city of Beroea [...], had his troops and horses resting there when Cniva suddenly attacked him and, after inflicting heavy losses on the Roman army, drove the emperor and the few survivors from Thrace back through the mountains to Moesia. In Moesia Gallus, commander of that frontier sector, had numerous forces. By reuniting them with as many of his own who had survived the enemy, Decius prepared to continue the military campaign.

— Jordanes, De origine actibusque Getarum, XVIII, 2.

The defeat inflicted on Decius was so heavy that it prevented the emperor not only from continuing the campaign, but especially from saving Philippopolis, which, having fallen into the hands of the Goths, was sacked and set on fire. Of the governor of Thrace, Titus Julius Priscus, who had attempted to proclaim himself emperor, no one heard anything more.

251
At the beginning of the year imperial coinage celebrated a new "Germanic victory," following which Herennius Etruscus was proclaimed augustus along with his father Decius. The Goths, who had spent the winter in Roman territory, offered the return of their booty and prisoners following this defeat on condition that they could retreat undisturbed. But Decius, who had now decided to destroy this horde of barbarians, preferred to reject Cniva's proposals and on the way back arranged his armies and engaged the enemy in battle near Abritus in Dobruja. There the Goths, though exhausted, managed to inflict a crushing defeat on the Roman army (July 251), even killing the emperor and his eldest son, Erennius Etruscus. It was the first time a Roman emperor fell in battle against a foreign enemy. This is Jordanes' narrative of the events:

And immediately Decius' son fell fatally pierced by an arrow. At the news the father, certainly to cheer up the soldiers, reportedly said, "Let no one be sad, the loss of one man must not affect the forces of the Republic." But shortly thereafter, not withstanding his father's grief, he launched himself at the enemy, seeking either death or revenge for his son. [...] He therefore lost both his empire and his life.

— Jordanes, De origine actibusque Getarum, XVIII, 3.

Decius: antoninianus
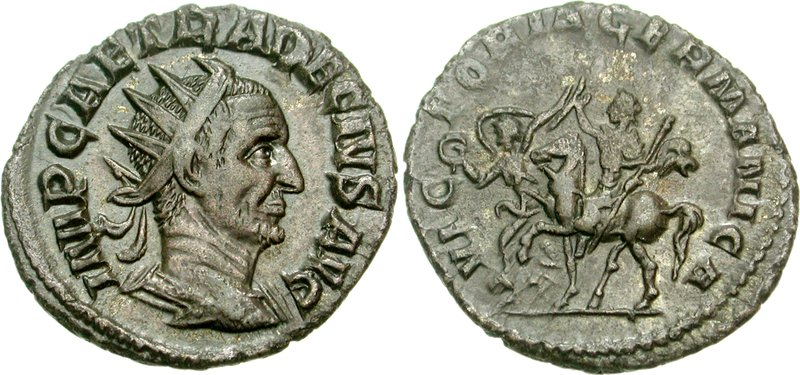
First side of the image: IMP CAE TRA DECIVS AVG, head with radiate crown, wearing a breastplate;
Second side of the image: VIC-TORIA GERMANICA, Decius on horseback to the left, raising his right hand and holding a scepter in his left one; on the left the goddess Victoria is advancing to the left, holding a branch in her right hand and a palm tree in her left one.
3.33 gr, 12 h; coined in 251 (Temple of Juno Moneta).

His youngest son, Hostilian, remained emperor, who was in turn adopted by the then legate of the two Moesias, Trebonianus Gallus, who was himself acclaimed emperor that same month. Gallus, rushing to the scene of the battle, concluded an unfavorable peace with the Goths of Cniva: not only did he allow them to keep the spoils, but also the prisoners captured in Philippopolis, many of them from wealthy noble families. In addition, they were guaranteed annual subsidies against a promise never to set foot on Roman soil again.

252
From this date the Quadi again began an increasing attack on the Pannonian limes, in the area opposite the legionary fortress of Brigetio.

253
A new wave of Goths, Borans, Carpi and Heruli brought destruction as far as Pessinus and Ephesus by sea, and then by land as far as the territories of Cappadocia. This is what Zosimus relates:

Since Trebonianus Gallus administered power poorly, the Scythians [meaning the Goths, ed.] began to invade neighboring provinces, and they advanced by plundering even the territories washed by the sea [the Black Sea, ed.], and so no province of the Romans was spared their devastation. All the cities without fortifications and most of those provided with walls were taken. And as well as the war, an epidemic of plague also broke out everywhere, in villages and towns, eliminating the surviving barbarians and causing so many deaths as never before.

— Zosimus, New History, I.26.

And while Aemilianus, then governor of Lower Mesia, was forced to cleanse the Roman territories south of the Danube of the hordes of barbarians, clashing victoriously once again with the leader of the Goths, Cniva (spring of 253) and obtaining thanks to these successes the title of emperor, the armies of the Sasanians of Shapur I took advantage of this, causing a simultaneous breakthrough of the eastern front, penetrating Mesopotamia and Syria until they occupied Antioch.

==== Third phase: the diarchy of Valerian in the East and Gallienus in the West (254-260) ====
Valerian: antoninianus
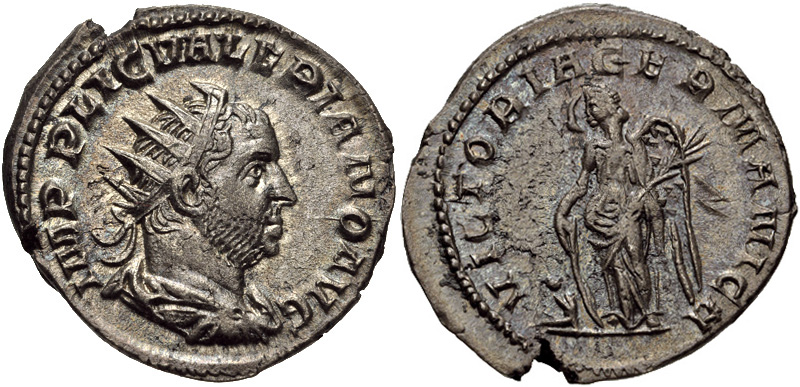
First side of the image: IMP P LIC VALERIANO AVG, head with crown, wearing breastplate;
Second side of the image: VICTORIA GERMANICA, Victoria standing toward the left, holding a shield and a palm tree.
21 mm, 3.90 g, coined in 253

Continued raids by barbarians in the two decades following the end of the Severan dynasty had brought the economy and trade of the Roman Empire to its knees. Numerous farms and crops had been destroyed, if not by barbarians, then by bands of brigands and by Roman armies seeking sustenance during military campaigns fought against both external and internal enemies (usurpers to the imperial purple). Moreover, food shortages generated a demand that exceeded the supply of foodstuffs, with obvious inflationary consequences on basic necessities. Added to all this was a constant forced recruitment of soldiers, to the detriment of the labor force employed in the agricultural countryside, resulting in the abandonment of many farms and vast areas of fields to be cultivated. This pressing demand for soldiers, in turn, had generated an implicit race to raise the price of obtaining the imperial purple. Each new emperor or usurper was forced, therefore, to offer his army increasing donations and ever more rewarding wages, to the serious detriment of the imperial treasury, which was often forced to cover these extraordinary expenses with the confiscation of huge estates of private citizens, victims in these years of "partisan" proscriptions. These difficulties forced the new emperor, Valerian, to partition the administration of the Roman state with his son Gallienus, entrusting the latter with the western part and reserving the eastern part for himself, as had previously been the case with Marcus Aurelius and Lucius Verus (161-169).

254
At the beginning of the year, a new incursion of Goths devastated the region of Thessalonica: the Germans failed to conquer the city, which, however, only with difficulty and much effort was liberated by the Roman armies of the new emperor Valerian. The panic was so great that the inhabitants of Achaia decided to rebuild the ancient walls of Athens and many other Peloponnesian cities. Franks and Alemanni were stopped in the course of one of their attempts to break through the Roman limes by the young caesar Gallienus, who earned for these successes the appellation of "Restitutor Galliarum" and "Germanicus maximus." His merit was that he contained the dangers at least in part, by an agreement with one of the leaders of the Germans, who undertook to prevent other barbarians from crossing the Rhine and thus to oppose new invaders.

255
The Goths resumed their attacks, this time by sea, along the coast of Asia Minor, after commandeering numerous vessels from the Cimmerian Bosphorus, an ally of Rome. The first to seize these vessels, however, were the Borans, who, sailing along the eastern coast of the Black Sea, pushed on to the very edge of the Roman Empire, near the city of Pityus, which fortunately for it had a very solid walled enclosure and a well-equipped harbor. There they were repelled thanks to vigorous resistance on the part of the local population, organized for the occasion by the then governor Successianus. The Goths, on the other hand, having departed with their ships from the Crimean peninsula, reached the mouth of the Phasis River (located in the Guria region of Georgia, in the vicinity of the present town of Sukhumi); they also advanced toward Pityus, which they succeeded this time in occupying, partly because Successianus, who had been promoted prefect of the Praetorium, had followed Emperor Valerian to Antioch. The great fleet then continued as far as Trapezunt, succeeding in occupying this important city as well, protected by a double wall and several thousand soldiers, as Zosimus relates:

The Goths, as soon as they noticed that the soldiers inside the walls were lazy and drunken and did not even go up along the walkways of the walls, pulled over a few logs to the wall, where it was possible, and in the middle of the night, went up in small groups and conquered the city. [...] The barbarians seized great wealth and a large number of prisoners [...] and after destroying the temples, buildings and all that was beautiful and magnificent, they returned home with many ships.

— Zosimus, New History, I, 33.

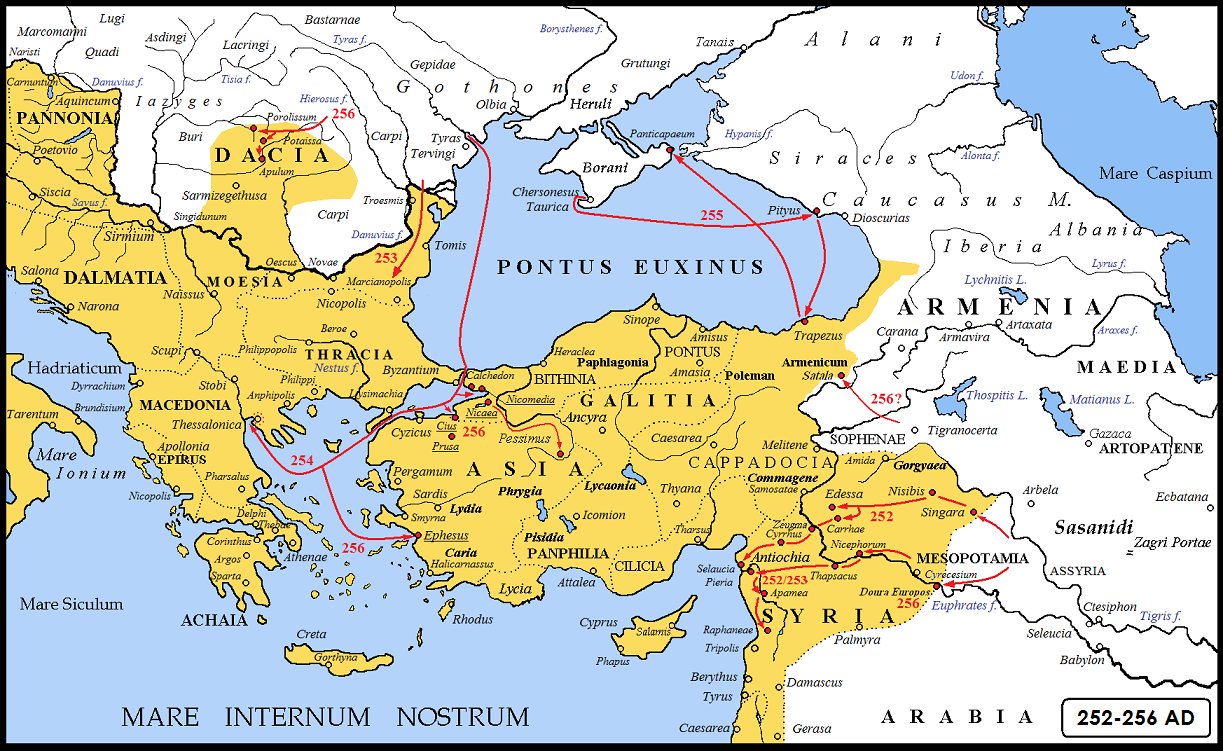
Barbarian invasions of Goths, Borans, Carpi, contemporary with those of the Sasanids of Shapur I, from the years 252-256, during the reign of Valerian and Gallienus.

Loaded by now with enormous booty, on their way back they also sacked the city of Pantikapaion, in present-day Crimea, disrupting the grain supplies needed by the Romans in that region. The situation was so serious that Gallienus was forced to rush along the Danubian borders to reorganize his forces after this devastating invasion, as an inscription from the legionary fortress of Viminacium would attest.

256
It was not long before a new invasion of Goths crossed the Black Sea, this time to the west coast, advancing as far as Lake Fileatina (present-day Derkos) west of Byzantium. From there they continued as far as below the walls of Chalcedon. The city was plundered of all its great riches, even though, Zosimus reports, the garrison outnumbered the Goth assailants. Many other important cities of Bithynia, such as Prusa, Apamea, and Cius were sacked by the Gothic armies, while Nicomedia and Nicaea were set on fire.

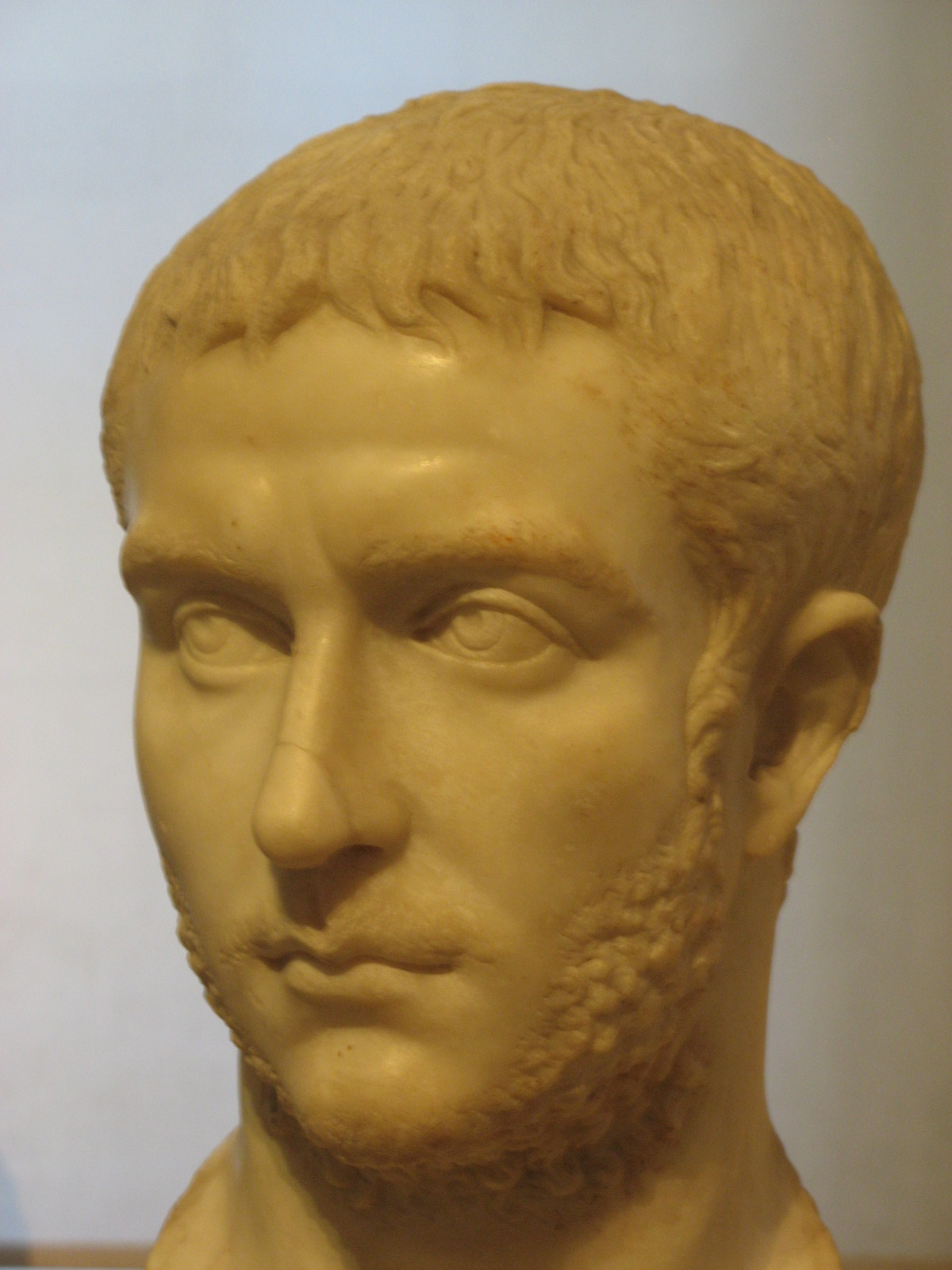
Emperor Gallienus, son of Valerian, who reigned from 253 to 268, faced one of the most terrible periods of barbarian invasions.

At the same time much of the northern territories of the province of the Three Dacias (i.e. all of Dacia Porolissensis and part of Upper Dacia) were lost to a new invasion of Goths and Carpi. Once they had crossed the Carpathian mountain range, the invaders were able to drive the Romans out of the northern area, with the exception of the southernmost areas close to the Danube (i.e., the present-day regions of Oltenia and Transylvania). These events have been handed down by a short passage from Eutropius and confirmed by the numerous archaeological excavations in the area, which testify to a total cessation of Roman inscriptions and coins in the north of the country from precisely the year 256. The presence of some officers of the V Macedonica and XIII Gemina legions near Poetovio is also attested, confirming a principle of "emptying" the garrisons of the Three Dacias for the benefit of neighboring Pannonia. However, Roman resistance to the invasions of the Goths and Carpi in the south of the province was celebrated the following year, when Gallienus was given the appellation "Dacicus maximus."

257
Valerian, concerned about the invasion of the Goths in the previous year, sent a relief army, commanded by Lucius Mummius Felix Cornelianus and in whose employ seems to have been the future emperor Aurelian, to better defend the important stronghold of Byzantium; the emperor, in turn, went to Cappadocia and Bithynia to bring relief to the people of this province. However, Valerian's arrival had no effect, as the resurgence of a plague epidemic and the Persian advance of the previous years had thrown the Roman East into the greatest despondency. It is also probable that the various successfully conducted assaults by the barbarians caused Shapur I to realize that a well-planned and simultaneous attack by the Sasanian king would allow his armies to sweep into the eastern Roman provinces, with the intention of joining the Goths from the Black Sea coast. The Rhine front of Lower Germania was disrupted by new attacks by the Franks, who managed to push as far as Mogontiacum, where they were stopped by the advancing legio VI Gallicana, of which the future emperor Aurelian was a military tribune. Gallienus, having left Illyricum on forced marches, rushed to the West, managing to beat back the Frankish hordes near Cologne and after clearing the entire left bank of the Rhine of barbarian armies.

258
Again the Franks, who had broken through the limes of lower Germany the previous year, made a new incursion, wedging themselves into the imperial territories in front of Cologne and then pushing on as far as Hispania (where they sacked Tarragona), as far as Gibraltar and the coasts of Roman Mauretania. The invasion was, once again, repelled, as reflected in the coinage of the period, according to which Gallienus was granted the victorious title of Germanicus Maximus for the fifth time.

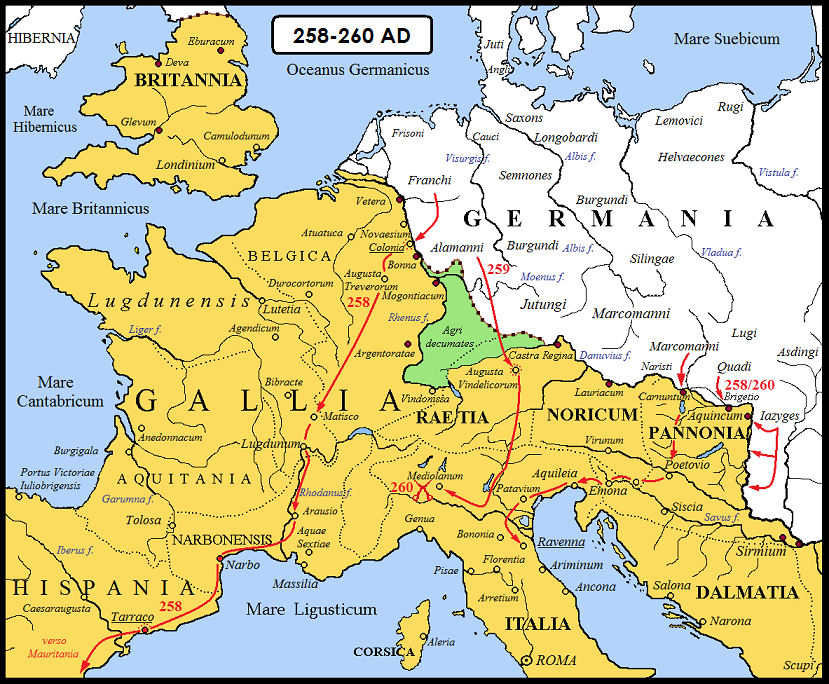
Invasions in the West of Franks, Alemanni, Marcomanni, Quadi, Iazyges, and Roxolani of the years 258-260.

258-260
Quadi, Marcomanni, Iazyges, and Roxolani were responsible for the great catastrophe that struck the Pannonian limes in these years (Aquincum and the important fort of Intercisa were sacked), with the depopulation of the countryside of the entire province. In the same period, Eutropius tells of a new Germanic incursion (possibly by Marcomanni) that reached Ravenna before being stopped, just as Emperor Valerian was engaged on the eastern front against the Sasanids of Shapur I. Also during this period, Gallienus allowed some tribes of Marcomanni to settle in Roman Pannonia south of the Danube, probably to repopulate the countryside devastated by the invasions of the previous decades, and contracted a secondary marriage with the daughter of one of their princes.

[Gallienus] had as a concubine a girl named Pipa, whom he received when part of the province of Upper Pannonia was granted under a treaty to her father, king of the Marcomanni, given to him as a wedding gift.

— Sextus Aurelius Victor, De Vita et Moribus Imperatorum Romanorum, 33.6.

==== Fourth phase: secessionist states and the height of the crisis (260-268) ====
From 260 onward, and until about 274, the Roman Empire suffered the secession of two vast territorial areas, but these allowed its survival. In the west, the usurpers of the Gallic Empire, such as Postumus (260-268), Laelian (268), Marcus Aurelius Marius (268-269), Victorinus (269-271), Domitian II (271), and Tetricus (271-274), succeeded in defending the borders of the provinces of Britain, Gaul, and Hispania. Eutropius writes:

Since Gallienus had thus abandoned the state, the Roman Empire was saved in the West by Postumus and in the East by Odaenathus.

— Eutropius, Breviarium ab urbe condita, 9, 11.

Postumus had succeeded in establishing an empire in the West, centered on the provinces of Germania Inferior and Gallia Belgica, and which was joined shortly afterwards by all the other Gallic, British, Hispanic, and, for a short time, even the province of Rhaetia.

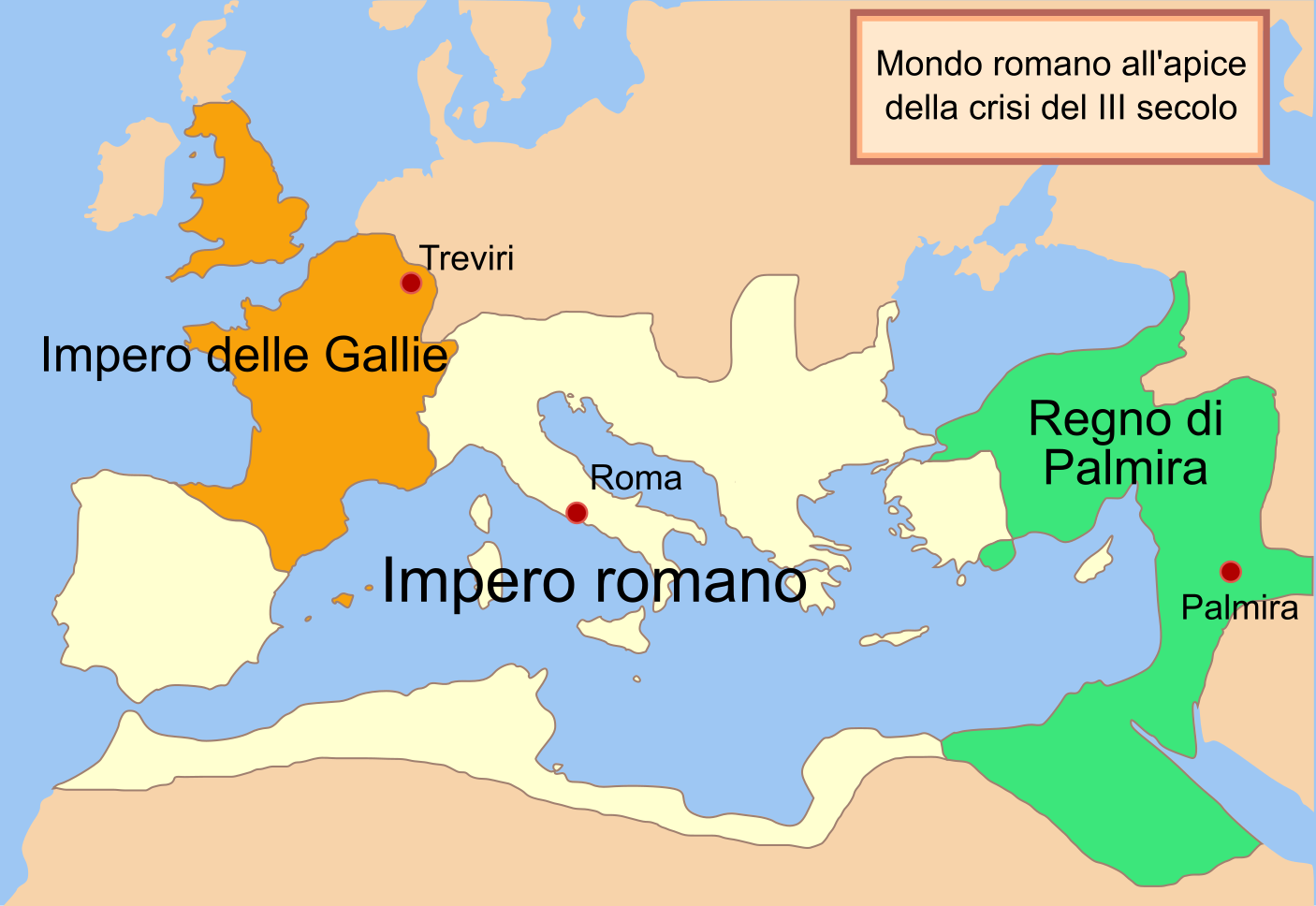
270 AD: Roman Empire at the center, with the Gallic Empire in the West, the Kingdom of Palmyra in the East.

These emperors not only formed their own senate at their major center of Augusta Treverorum and gave the classical titles of consul, pontifex maximus or tribune of the plebs to their magistrates in the name of Roma Aeterna, but also assumed the normal imperial titling, minting coins at the mint of Lugdunum, aspiring to unity with Rome and, more importantly, never thinking of marching against the so-called "legitimate" emperors (such as Gallienus, Claudius the Gothic, Quintillus or Aurelian) who ruled over Rome (i.e., those who ruled Italy, the West African provinces up to Tripolitania, the Danubian provinces and the Balkan area). They, on the contrary, felt they had to defend the Rhine borders and the Gallic littoral from attacks by the Germanic populations of Franks, Saxons, and Alemanni. The Imperium Galliarum turned out, therefore, to be one of the three territorial areas that allowed Rome to retain its western part.

In the East, on the other hand, it was the Kingdom of Palmyra that took over from Rome the government of the provinces of Asia Minor, Syria and Egypt, defending them from Persian attacks, first with Odaenathus (260-267), appointed "Corrector Orientis" by Gallienus, and then with his secessionist widow, Zenobia (267-271).

260
In the course of this year the territories that formed an indentation between the Rhine and the Danube, south of the so-called Germanic-Rhaetian limes (the Agri Decumates) were abandoned for the benefit of the Swabian populations of the Alemanni. The numerous signs of destruction along this stretch of the Limes at Kempten, Bregenz, Grenoble, and Lausanne and the reopening of the legionary fortress at Vindonissa and the auxiliary forts at Augusta Raurica, Castrum Rauracense, and modern Basel seem to be ascribed to this year. It is no coincidence that the inscription found on the altar of Augusta recalls a victory against the Germanic peoples of Semnones and Juthungi (April 260), in the year in which Postumus was already augustus and consul together with Honoratianus. On this occasion thousands of Italic prisoners were freed by troops rushed from Rhaetia and Upper Germany and placed under the command of Marcus Simplicinus Genius.

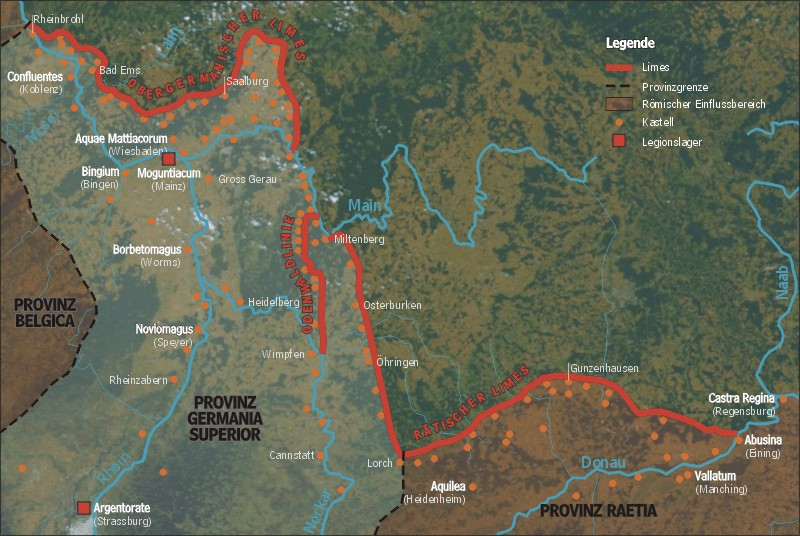
The German-Rhaetian limes, abandoned around 260.

It was probably Gallienus who decided on the final abandonment of all the territories east of the Rhine and north of the Danube, due to the continued invasions of the neighboring Germanic tribes of the Alemanni, and the simultaneous secession of the western part of the empire, led by the governor of Upper and Lower Germania, Postumus. The Alemanni, who had broken through the Rhaetian limes and crossed the Brenner Pass, had pushed into Italy, where they were intercepted and beaten by Gallienus' armies near Milan. The emperor apparently had been unable to intervene earlier along the Germanic-Rhaetic front because of the simultaneous eastern crisis involving his own father, Valerian, who was captured by the Sasanians of Shapur I in late summer.
At the same time, along the Limes of lower Germany hordes of Franks succeeded in seizing the legionary fortress of Castra Vetera and besieged Cologne, while sparing Augusta Treverorum (today's Trier). Others swept along the coast of Gaul and devastated some villages as far as the mouths of the Seine and Somme rivers.

261
A new incursion of the Alemanni into the Moselle area as far as Augusta Treverorum and Metz was stopped by Postumus' armies. The Roman counteroffensive was led by the former governor, now regent of the Gallic Empire. He not only repelled the invasion of the Alemanni and Franks further north, but also succeeded in reoccupying and fortifying again a number of advanced auxiliary posts in the territory of the ex-Agri decumates, along the plain of the Neckar River, earning himself the proclamation of the "Victoria germanica." For these successes, he assumed the appellation of "Restitutor Galliarum" ("restorer of Gaul"), also deciding to hire from the ranks of his army bands of newly defeated Frankish soldiers to fight against their own "brothers," as testified by Aurelius Victor.

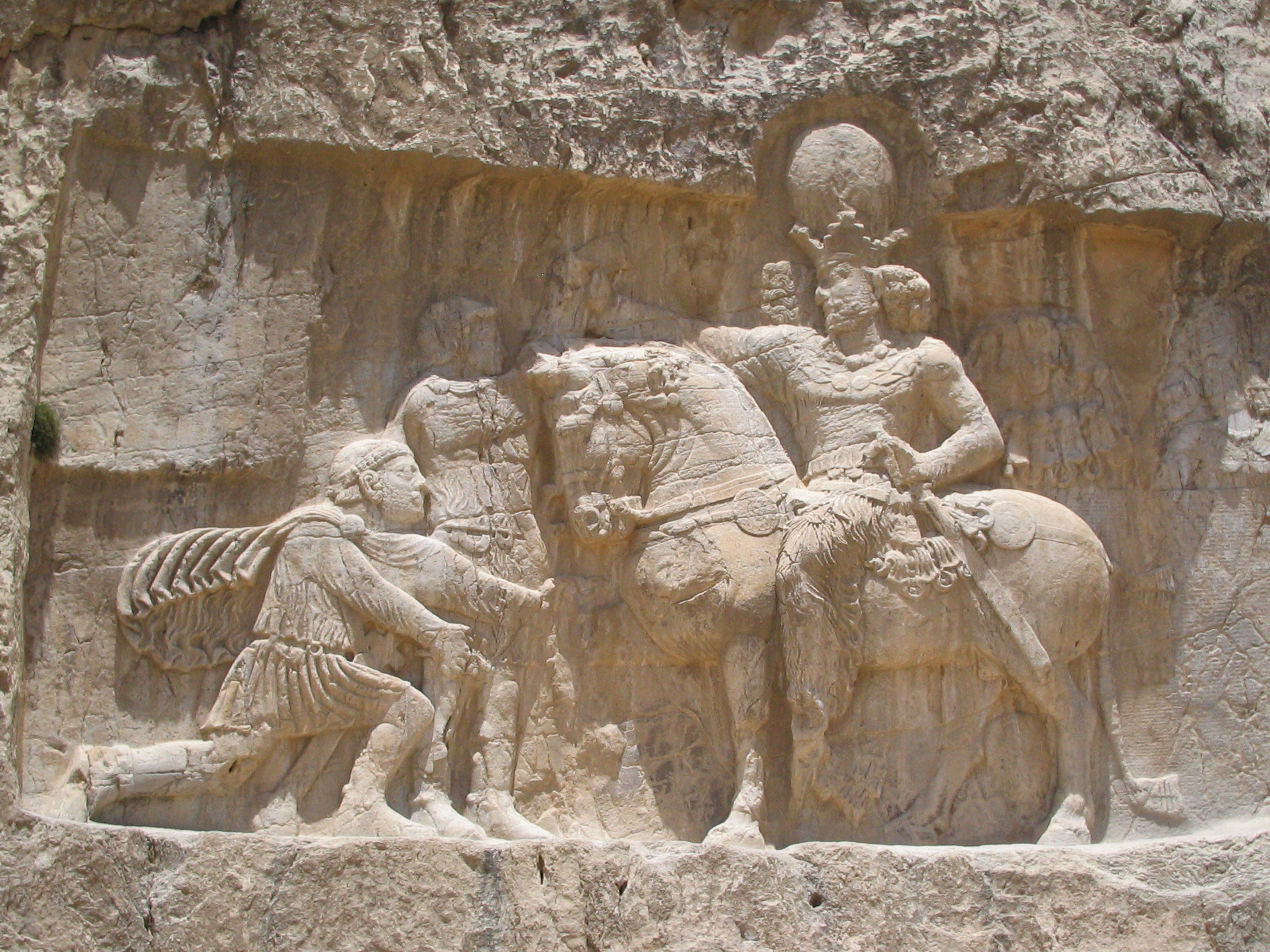
Sasanian relief at Naqsh-e Rostam depicting Shapur I holding Valerian captive and receiving homage from Philip the Arab, kneeling before the Sasanian shahanshah.

261-262
Valerian's capture by the Persians generated, in addition to the secession to the west of the Gallic Empire, a continuous series of usurpations, mostly among the commanders of the Danubian military provinces (a period referred to as the "thirty tyrants"). Gallienus, forced to fight on several fronts simultaneously to defend the legitimacy of his throne, employed much of the armies assigned to defend the imperial borders to counter many of these generals who had proclaimed themselves emperors. The result was to leave large strategic sectors of the limes unprotected, provoking a new invasion by the Sarmatians in Pannonia. Thus it was only as a result of a later intervention by Gallienus that the invaders were repelled.

To these negative things had also been added that the Scythians [meaning the Goths, ed.] had invaded Bithynia and destroyed some cities. Eventually they burned and severely devastated the city of Asta, now called Nicomedia.

— Historia Augusta - The Two Gallieni, 4.7-8.

262
The Goths made a new incursion by sea along the Black Sea coast, managing to sack Byzantium, ancient Ilium and Ephesus.

Since the Scythians [i.e., the Goths, ed.] had brought great destruction to Hellas and besieged Athens, Gallienus sought to fight against them, who by then had occupied Thrace.

— Zosimus, New History, I, 39.1.

264
According to the Historia Augusta, while in the East Odaenathus had managed to push the Persians back to the walls of their own capital, Ctesiphon, the Goths:

invaded Cappadocia. There they occupied some cities and, after a war waged with uncertain outcome, headed for Bithynia.

— Historia Augusta - The Two Gallieni, 11.1.

late 267-early 268
A new and immense invasion by the Goths, together with the Peucini, the "latest arrivals" in the region of what is now the Azov Sea, the Heruli, and numerous other peoples took shape from the mouth of the Tyras River (near the city of the same name) and began the most astonishing invasion of the third century, which shook the coasts and hinterlands of the Roman provinces of Asia Minor, Thrace and Achaia facing the Euxinian Pontus and the Aegean Sea.

The Scythians [to be understood as Goths, ed.], sailing through the Pontus Euxinus penetrated the Danube and brought great devastation to Roman soil. Gallienus knowing these things gave the Byzantines Cleodamus and Athenaeus the task of rebuilding and walling the cities, and when a battle was fought near Pontus the barbarians were defeated by the Byzantine generals. The Goths were also beaten in a naval battle by General Venerian, and he himself died during the fight.

— Historia Augusta - The Two Gallieni, 13.6-7.

And so the different tribes of Scythia, such as Peucini, Grutungi, Ostrogoths, Tervingi, Visigoths, Gepids, Celts and Heruli, attracted by the hope of looting, came to Roman soil and wreaked great devastation there, while Claudius was engaged in other actions [against the Alamanni, ed.] [...]. Three hundred and twenty thousand armed men from the different peoples were fielded [...] in addition to having two thousand ships (six thousand according to Zosimus), that is, twice as many as were used by the Greeks [...] when they undertook the conquest of the cities of Asia [the Trojan War, ed.]

— Historia Augusta - Claudius II Gothicus, 6.2-8.1.

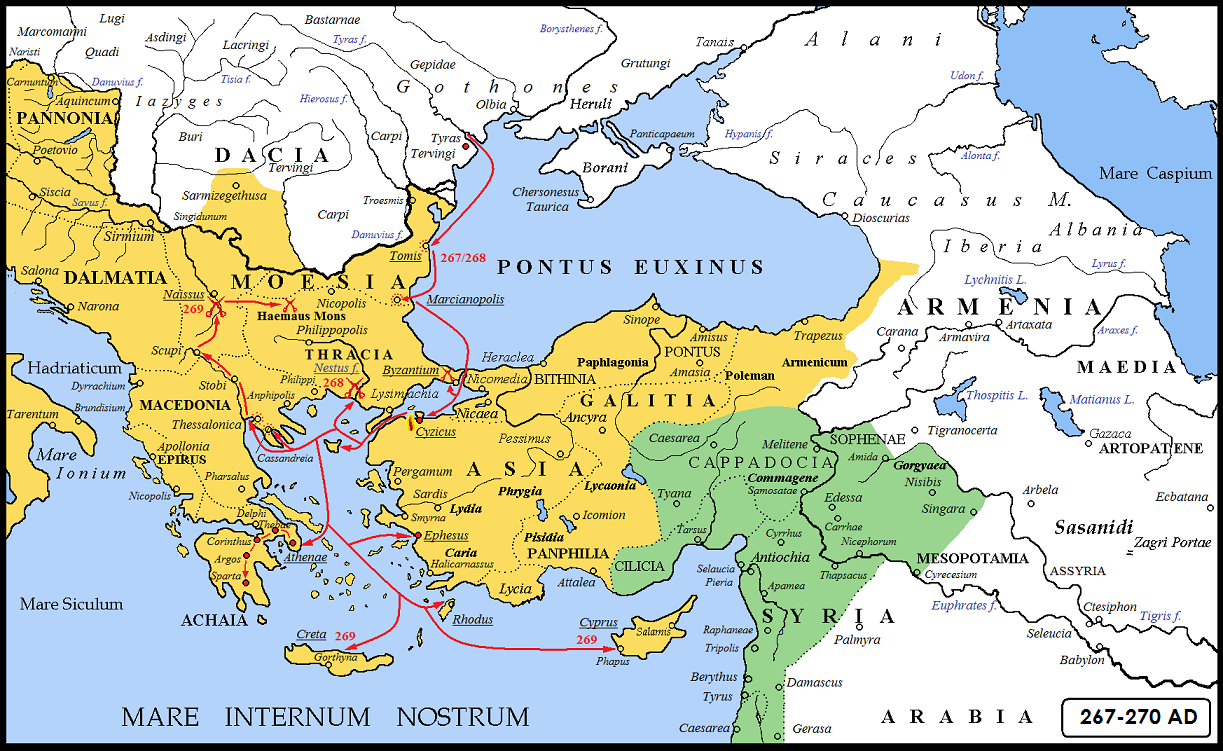
The invasion of the Gothic peoples of 267/268-270 during the reigns of Gallienus and Claudius the Gothic. In green color the kingdom of Palmyra of Queen Zenobia and Vaballathus.

The barbarians first assaulted the city of Tomi, but were repelled. They continued by invading Moesia and Thrace until they reached Marcianopolis. Having failed this second objective as well, they continued their sail southward, but having arrived in the straits of the Propontis they suffered numerous losses due to a violent storm that had come upon them.
Having turned their sails toward Cyzicus, which they besieged unsuccessfully, they suffered near Byzantium an initial defeat by the rushing Roman army, but the barbarians' incursion continued until they skirted the Hellespont and reached Mount Athos. Having rebuilt some of their ships destroyed by the previous storm, they divided into at least three columns:

1. one first headed west, unsuccessfully besieging Cyzicus, then sacking the islands of Imbros and Lemnos, occupying the future city of Chrysopolis (across from Byzantium), continuing as far as under the walls of Cassandreia and then Thessalonica, and bringing devastation to the hinterland of the province of Macedonia as well.
2. a second army, arriving near the mouth of the Nestos, attempted to move up it northward, but was intercepted by the Roman armies and suffered a bitter defeat at the hands of Gallienus, who had rushed to the occasion. The story goes that Gallienus managed to beat back the hordes of barbarians, which included the Goths, killing a large number of them (spring of 268). Following these events he offered the leader of the Heruli, Naulobatus, the "ornamenta consularia," after his people (identifiable with the "Scythians" of the Historia Augusta), having formed a convoy of chariots, had attempted to flee through Mount Gessace (the present Rhodope Mountains). Soon afterwards Gallienus was forced to return to Italy to besiege the usurper Aureolus in Milan, who had attempted to usurp his throne.
3. a third one headed south along the coasts of Asia Minor, Thessaly and Achaia, where the barbarians succeeded in sacking Sparta, Argos, Corinth and Thebes. The historian Dexippus relates in his Chronicle that he himself succeeded in the feat of repelling an initial attack on the city walls of Athens.

They fought in Achaia, under the command of Marcian, against the Goths, who, defeated by the Achaeans, retreated from there. While the Scythians, always part of the Goths, ravaged Asia [these are the invasions that began in 267/268 and ended in 269/70, ed.], where the temple at Ephesus was burned.

— Historia Augusta - The Two Gallieni, 6.1-2.

268
During this year, the Alemanni once again succeeded in penetrating northern Italy through the Brenner Pass, taking advantage of the absence of the Roman army, which was busy facing both the devastating invasion of the Goths in Moesia, Achaia, Macedonia, Pontus, and Asia, and the usurper Aureolus, who had fortified himself in Milan. The subsequent rush of the Roman army of Claudius II the Gothic (the new emperor who had witnessed Aureolus' capitulation), forced the Alemanni to stop their raids and negotiate their withdrawal from Italic soil. The failure to reach an agreement forced Claudius to fight them: he scored the decisive victory in November, in the Battle of Lake Benacus (Lake Garda), which, as Aurelius Victor relates, allowed their final expulsion from northern Italy with very heavy losses. It is said that more than half of the barbarians perished in the course of the battle.

==== Fifth phase: the reunion of the old empire (269-275) ====
Beginning with Claudius Gothicus, but especially with his successor, Aurelian, the ideal of a restoration of the unity of the Roman Empire became firmly established. The main task awaiting this last emperor was to have to reunite the two "trunks" that had been formed during the reign of Gallienus, namely, the Gallic Empire in the West and the kingdom of Queen Zenobia's Palmyra in the East.

Claudius Gothicus: Antoninianus
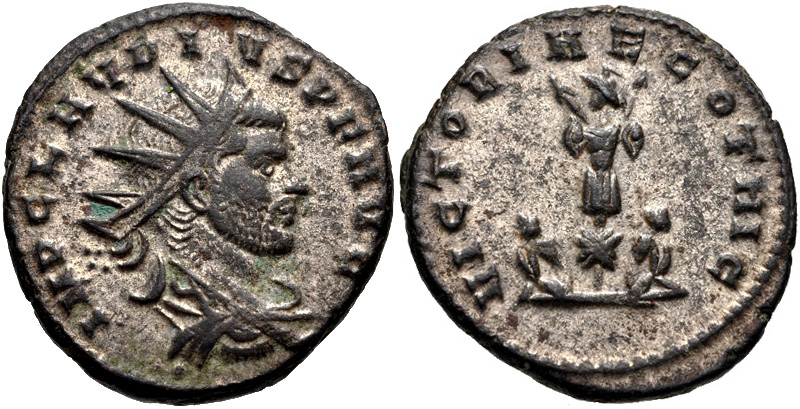
First side of the image: IMP CLAVDIVS P(ius) F(elix)? AVG, emperor's head toward right wearing breastplate
Second side of the image: VICTORIAE GOTHIC, a trophy is depicted with two Gothic prisoners at its feet.
19 mm, 4.68 g, coined in 269/270

269
Early in the year, after the Goths had been held at bay for several months by the Roman armies of Marcianus, the new emperor Claudius II managed to reach the theater of the fighting and bring a decisive victory over these people at the battle of Naissus, where it is reported that as many as fifty thousand barbarians lost their lives. The Germans had arrived in the heart of Moesia by traveling along the road from Thessalonica to Scupi and then northward, having ravaged the territories around Pelagonia (present-day Bitola). The survivors of the battle of Naissus, protecting themselves with chariots, headed into Macedonia. During the long march on the way back, many of the barbarians died along with their beasts, oppressed by starvation; others were killed in a new clash with the Roman cavalry of the "Equites Dalmatae," the mobile strategic reserve just established by Gallienus. The march of the Goths continued in an easterly direction toward Mount Hemaus. However, the barbarians, although surrounded by the legions, managed to cause considerable losses to the Roman infantry, which was saved only by the intervention of the cavalry entrusted to Aurelian, alleviating the defeat: At the same time, the other hordes of Goths, who had swarmed the previous year into the Aegean Sea and the eastern Mediterranean Sea and had engaged in piracy, were finally repelled after a series of skirmishes by the incumbent prefect of Egypt, Tenaginus Probus, in the waters opposite the islands of Cyprus, Crete, and Rhodes. The Historia Augusta, referring to a speech by Claudius would have him utter these words:

We have defeated three hundred and twenty thousand Goths and sunk two thousand ships. The rivers are covered with the enemy's shields, all the beaches are covered with swords and spears. The fields can no longer even be seen hidden by bones, there is no clear road, numerous chariots have been abandoned. We have captured so many women that our victorious soldiers can keep two or three each for themselves.

— Historia Augusta - Claudius, 8.4-8.6.

As a result of these events Claudius, who had succeeded in driving back across the Danube the immense barbarian horde, was able to boast of the appellation "Gothicus maximus," and the coins minted that year celebrated his "Victoria gothica." Of the surviving barbarians, a part was struck down by a terrible pestilence, another joined the Roman army, and a last one stopped to cultivate the lands received along the imperial borders.
The Historia Augusta records that also in the same year the usurper Laelian, who succeeded Postumus in the Gallic Empire, reorganized the provinces under his control:

Many cities in Gaul and also many fortresses that Postumus had built in barbarian territory [across the Rhine River, ed.] over the course of seven years and that, after his death, had been destroyed and burned during a sudden incursion of the Germans [these were either the Franks or the Alemanni, in early 269, ed.], had been rebuilt, restoring them to their previous state.

— Historia Augusta - The Thirty Pretenders, Lollianus, 4.

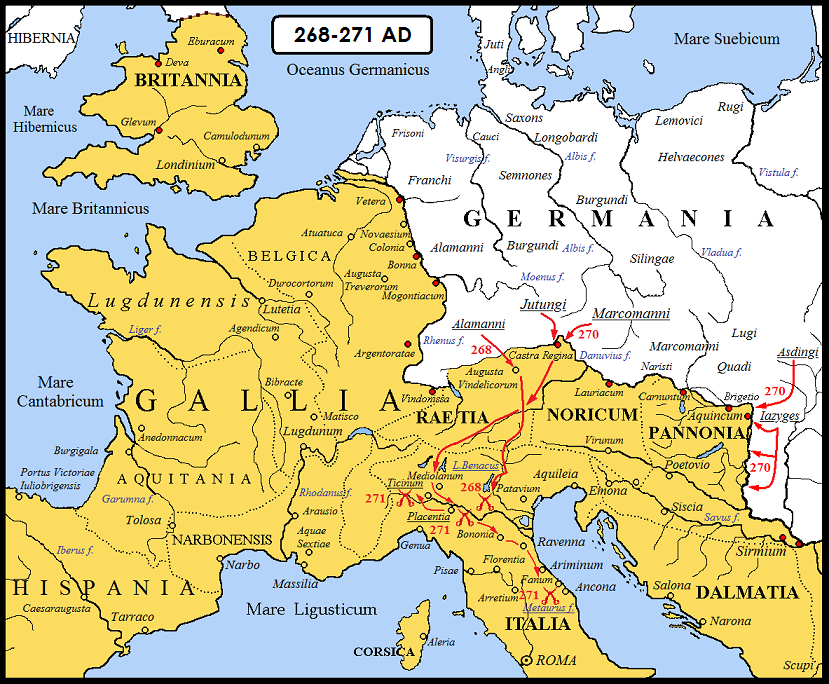
The invasion of the western part of the Roman Empire of the years 268–271 by the Alemanni, Marcomanni, Juthungi, Iazyges, and Hasdingi Vandals.

270
With the beginning of the year, while Claudius was still engaged in dealing with the Gothic threat, a new invasion of Juthungi again caused extensive damage in Rhaetia and Noricum. Claudius, compelled to intervene with great readiness, entrusted the Balkan command to Aurelian, while he himself headed to Sirmium, his headquarters, from where he could better monitor and act against the barbarians. Shortly afterward, however, he died, following a new plague epidemic that broke out in the ranks of his army (August): Claudius's untimely death forced Aurelian to conclude the war against the Goths in Thrace and the Moesias quickly, ending the sieges of Anchialus (near modern Pomorie, along the Bulgarian Black Sea coast) and Nicopolis ad Istrum. He also traveled shortly thereafter to Sirmium, where he received imperial acclamation from the troops stationed in Pannonia, and was aware that it was imperative to deal as soon as possible with the Juthungi who had broken through the Danubian front. :The barbarians had aimed only to loot, after the failure to pay the subsidies promised by the previous emperors; having learned of the new ruler's arrival and now satisfied with what they had plundered over the winter, they attempted to retreat, but were intercepted by the Romans near the Danube and defeated, though not outright. Their demands for a renewal of the previous peace treaty and recognition of new subsidies, however, were refused by Aurelian, who granted them only the possibility of returning to their native lands without spoils. The peace signed between the empire and the Germanic peoples defined the new emperor's policy toward the barbarians. He denied any compensation whatsoever in exchange for their foedus, which would have made the empire a tributary of its own federates. :In November of the same year, while Aurelian was in Rome, to officially receive full imperial powers from the Senate, a new invasion generated panic, this time in the provinces of Upper and Lower Pannonia, which evidently Aurelian had unseated in order to travel to Italy to repel the invasion of the Juthungi. This time it was the Hasdingi Vandals, together with some bands of Iazigi Sarmatians. Again, the prompt intervention of the emperor himself forced these Germano-Sarmatian peoples to capitulate and ask for peace. Aurelian forced the barbarians to provide as hostages many of their sons, as well as a contingent of auxiliary cavalry of two thousand men, in exchange for their return to their lands north of the Danube. For these successes he obtained the appellation Sarmaticus maximus.

Aurelian: Aureus
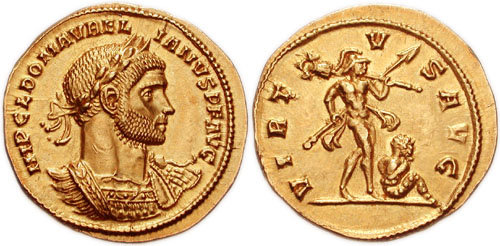
First side of the image: IMP C L DOM AVRELIANVS P F AUG, laureate head and torso with armor toward the right, wearing an'aegis (armor of Minerva);
Second side of the image: V-IRTVS AVG, Mars advancing to the right, holding a spear forward and a trophy over his left shoulder; at his feet a bound prisoner sitting toward the right.
21 mm, 4.70 gr, 6h; Mint of Mediolanum (Milan), third issue, minted in 271/272

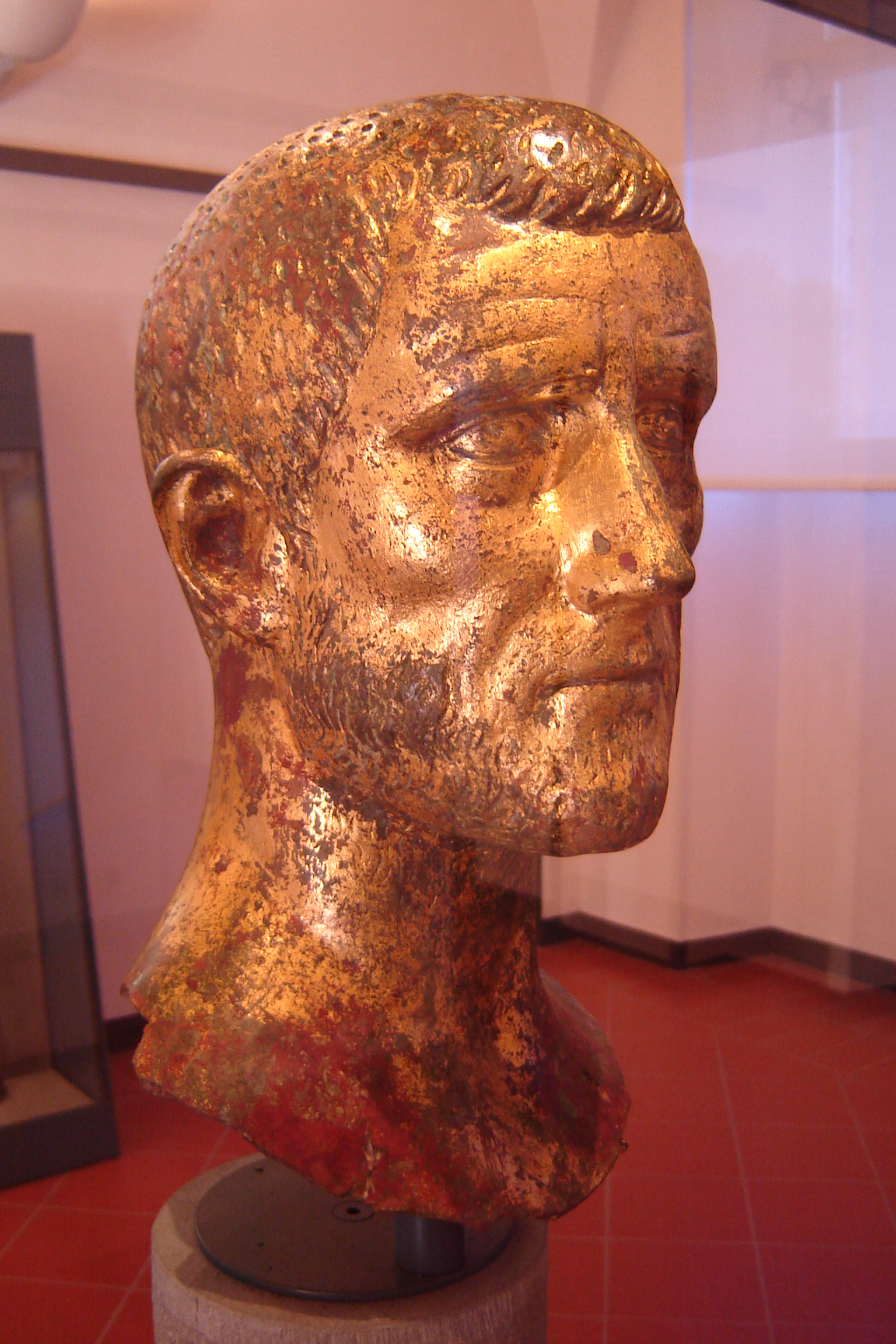
Bust of Aurelian in gilded bronze from the Santa Giulia Museum in Brescia.

271
This threat had barely ceased, and already a new one loomed on the horizon. This time it was a major joint invasion by Alemanni, Marcomanni, and some bands of Juthungi (Dexippus speaks explicitly of a new invasion by the Juthungi, who were still scourging the Italic soil). Aurelian, again, was forced to rush into Italy, now that these peoples had already forced their way through the Alpine passes. Reaching the Po Valley by forced marches along the Via Postumia, he was initially defeated by the coalition of barbarians near Piacenza, due to an ambush.

Aurelian wanted to face the enemy army all at once, gathering his forces together, but near Piacenza he suffered such a rout that the Roman Empire almost fell. The cause of this defeat was a treacherous and cunning movement on the part of the barbarians. They, unable to meet the fight in the open field, took refuge in a very dense forest and towards evening attacked ours by surprise.

— Historia Augusta - Aurelian, 21.1-3.

As the campaign continued, however, the barbarians, out of greed for booty, divided into numerous armed bands, scattered throughout the surrounding territory. Aurelian, having rallied his armies again after their defeat and determined to follow them on their march southward, succeeded in turning the tide of the war. The barbarians had continued to sack cities on the Adriatic coast such as Pesaro and Fano. Not far from the latter city, along the Via Flaminia on the banks of the Metauro River, the emperor managed to beat them a first time and then a second time decisively on the way back near Pavia. Following this last invasion, provision was made (in Diocletian's time) to bar the way to possible future invasions by fortifying the corridor from Pannonia and Dalmatia into Italy through the Julian Alps: the so-called Claustra Alpium Iuliarum.
Once the campaign in Italy was over, on his way to the East to fight Queen Zenobia of the Kingdom of Palmyra, he defeated Goths who were moving against him and, having crossed the Danube, killed their king, Cannabaudes, along with five thousand of his armies. For these successes, the Senate bestowed on him the appellation "Gothicus maximus."
The growing crisis along the Danubian frontiers, in addition to the secession in the West of the Empire of Gaul and in the East of the Kingdom of Palmyra, forced Aurelian to evacuate the province of the Three Dacias, under increasing blows mainly from the Goths (in particular, from the Tervingi tribe) and Carpi, as well as the Sarmatian Iazigians of the Tisza plain. He, clearing the area north of the Danube, decided, however, to form a new province of Dacia south of the course of the great river, hiving off two new regions from Lower Moesia: "Dacia Ripense" and "Dacia Mediterranea." The final abandonment of Dacia was completed between 271 and 273. The consequences of the Roman abandonment of the Carpathian basin generated not only new tensions between the Goths and Gepids in the east and the Iazyges in the west, due to the contact between the various tribes, but also allowed for the strengthening of the borders of the lower-middle Danube with the withdrawal of two entire legions (Legio V Macedonica and Legio XIII Gemina, now positioned in Oescus and Ratiaria) and a substantial number of auxiliary units, for a combined total of more than forty-five thousand armed men.

272
Returning from a new eastern campaign against Zenobia, the emperor was forced to intervene in Mesia and Thrace, for a new incursion by the Carpi. The latter were repelled and largely settled in Roman territories along the frontier of the lower reaches of the Danube, so much so that they earned him the appellation "Carpicus maximus."

272-274
Imperial unity could finally materialize with the defeat, first of Zenobia and Vaballathus in the East (kingdom of Palmyra) in 272, and then of Tetricus in the West (Gallic Empire) in 274, at the end of the battle near the Catalaunian Fields. However, Tetricus and Zenobia, after the triumph celebrated in Rome, were not executed: on the contrary, the former was appointed governor of Lucania, while the eastern queen was installed in Tivoli and given a Roman senator as her husband. This was in recognition of having "saved" the borders of the Empire from the invasions of the barbarians in the West and the Sasanians in the East.

274-275
Aurelian's victory over Tetricus provoked a new incursion by the Germans from across the Danube into the neighboring province of Rhaetia, so much so that the emperor himself had to intervene again before he went to the East, where he planned to wage a new campaign against the Sasanians in order to recover the lost territories of the Roman province of Mesopotamia.

==== Sixth phase: the Roman counteroffensive (276-284) ====
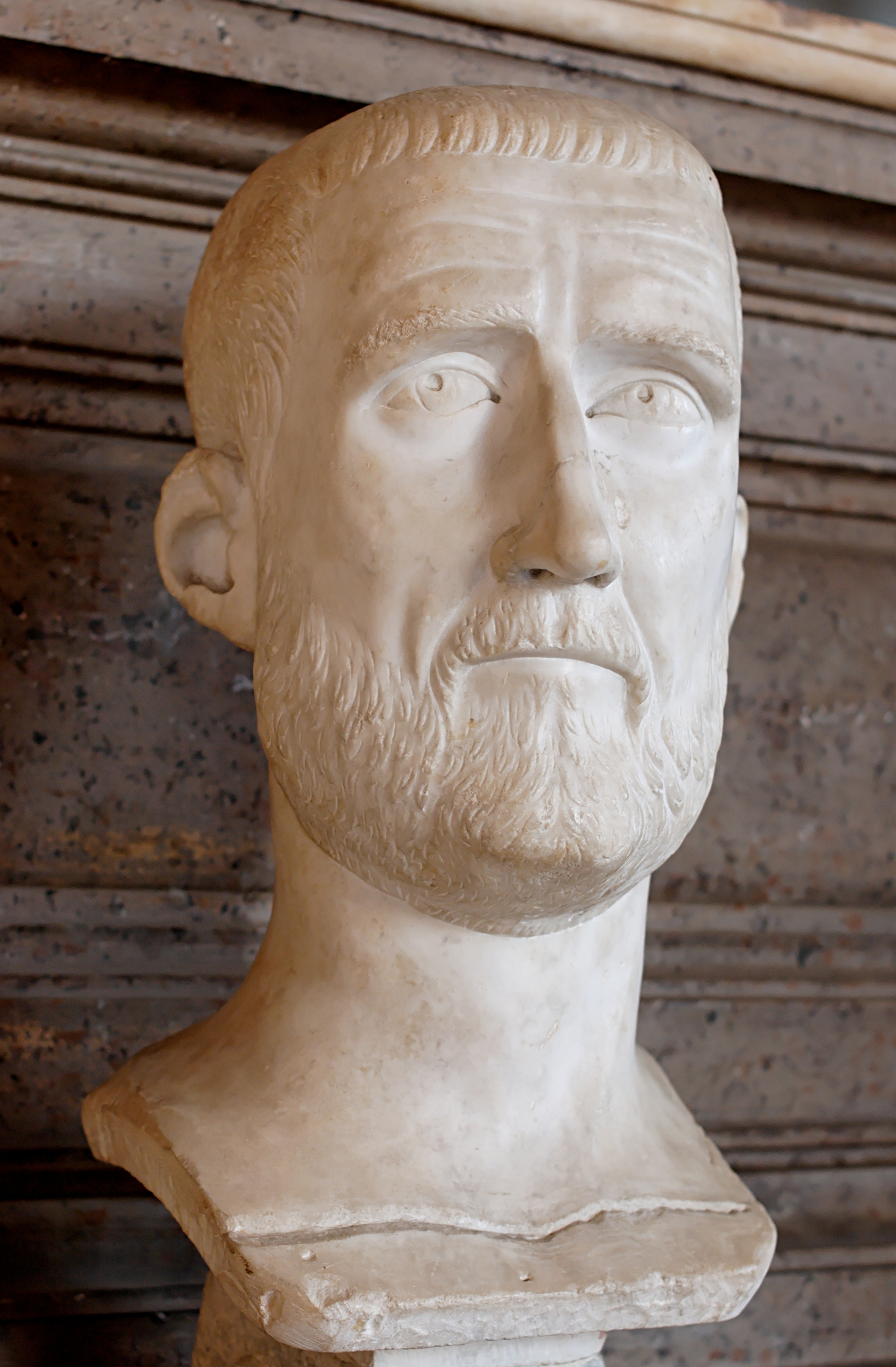
Bust of Marcus Aurelius Probus from the Capitoline Museums.

The assassination of Emperor Aurelian, on his way to lead a campaign against the Sasanian Empire, produced deep mourning throughout the empire, but also triggered new assaults by barbarians along the northern borders.

late 275-276
The Goths, together with the Heruli, moved from the territories of the Maeotian Swamp and returned to plunder Asia Minor even before Aurelian's death, reaching as far as the coast of Cilicia as early as the end of 275. After Aurelian's death, the task of confronting them was taken on by the new emperor Marcus Claudius Tacitus and his brother Marcus Annius Florianus: the latter brought back a victory that his brother had celebrated on coins ("Victoria gothica"), bearing the appellation "Gothicus maximus." Deciding to return to Rome in the early summer of 276, Tacitus left in the hands of his brother Florian, then prefect of the praetorium, the task of completing the campaign, but he fell victim to an assassination attempt in June 276. Florian, who clashed with Marcus Aurelius Probus at Tarsus, also fell victim to a plot hatched by his own soldiers. The imperial throne then passed to Probus, who decided to complete Tacitus's work and led a new campaign against the Goths in Asia Minor, beating them heavily. Also during this same period (around September 275) Gaul was invaded by the Franks, who traveled through the Moselle River valley and swept into the area of present-day Alsace. It is reported that more than seventy cities fell into their hands, and that only those few with walls, such as Augusta Treverorum, Colonia Claudia Ara Agrippinensium and Toulouse, escaped devastation and pillage. This invasion was followed by the joint invasion of the Lugii, Burgundians and possibly Vandals along the upper-middle reaches of the Danube.

277
Once the operations against the Goths were completed, Probus decided to march into Gaul to confront the Germans who had penetrated during the previous year's invasion. Probus' tactic was to deal separately with the various opposing forces, which, although numerically superior, were defeated one by one. The first to be beaten by the Roman armies of the emperor's generals were the Franks, who had penetrated into the northeastern part of Belgic Gaul. Then it was the turn of the Lugii: Probus freed their leader Semnon, who had been captured, on the condition that he lead the remnants of his people back to their home bases, leaving the Roman prisoners free and abandoning the plundered booty.

278
Probus now confronted the Burgundians and Vandals who had come to the rescue of the other Germanic tribes; they were beaten in Rhaetia, near the Lech river (called by Zosimus "Licca"). At the end of the clashes the same conditions that had been granted to the Lugii shortly before were agreed upon, but when the barbarians broke the understandings, retaining some of the prisoners, the emperor confronted them again. The Germans were severely defeated and the Romans also captured their leader, Igillus. At the end of these victories Probus also assumed the appellation "Germanicus maximus."

Marcus Aurelius Probus: antoninianus
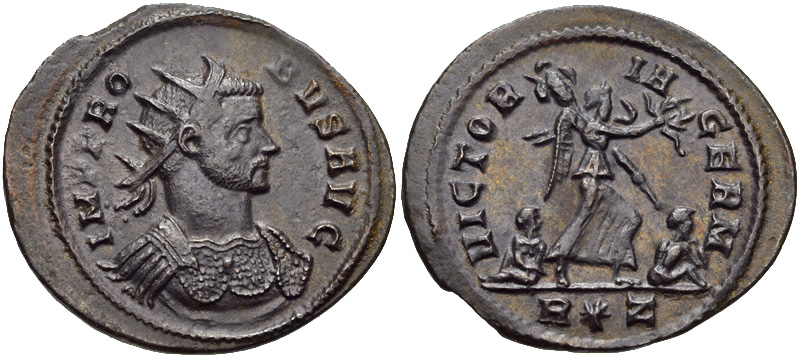
First side of the image: IMP PROB VS AVG, head with crown, wearing breastplate;
Second side of the image: VICTOR IA GERM, Victoria advancing to the right, two captive Germans bound at her feet, with the inscription R A on the bottom and a star in the center.
25 mm, 3.91 g, coined in 278

Finally, the Historia Augusta relates that in the course of the entire campaign the emperor had killed over four hundred thousand barbarians and liberated as many as sixty cities in Gaul. The vanquished were required to hand over hostages to guarantee the treaty; nine barbarian chieftains knelt together before Probus, a number of Roman military forts were restored along the Neckar river valleys, sixteen thousand Germans were conscripted into the ranks of the Roman army and distributed in groups of fifty or sixty among the various auxiliary units, and, to compensate for the demographic regression of the countryside, a certain number of barbarians ("laeti" or "gentiles" or "dediticii") were settled to cultivate the lands of the empire, as had been the case in the past, at the time of Marcus Aurelius and the Marcomannic Wars. Among these settlers a group of Franks settled in Pontus rebelled and, after seizing a number of ships, carried out raids and devastation in Achaia, Asia Minor, North Africa and pushed on as far as the city of Syracuse, which they occupied before returning home unharmed. Lastly, an inscription found at Augusta Vindelicorum records that this emperor is credited with restoring order along the borders of the province of Rhaetia as "Restitutor provinciae."
The emperor then turned his armies toward the front of the middle Danube, traveling along the river and reviewing all the troops in Noricum, Upper and Lower Pannonia (where he succeeded in defeating the Iazigians and Vandals), and Thrace. For these latter successes the title "RESTITUTOR ILLIRICI" ("restorer of Illyricum") was minted on the coins. Finally he went, at the end of that year, to Isauria to put down an uprising of brigands (with a final siege at their stronghold in Cremna, Pisidia).

280-281
The then governor of Germania Inferior, Gaius Quintus Bonosius, allowed bands of Alemanni to cross the Rhine and burn some ships of the Germanic fleet. Fearing the consequences of this loss, in late 280 he had himself proclaimed, in Colonia Agrippinensis (today's Cologne) and together with Titus Ilius Proculus, emperor of all Gaul, Britain, and Hispania. Eventually, however, both of these usurpers met their deaths with the arrival of Probus in Gaul.

Marcus Aurelius Probus: antoninianus
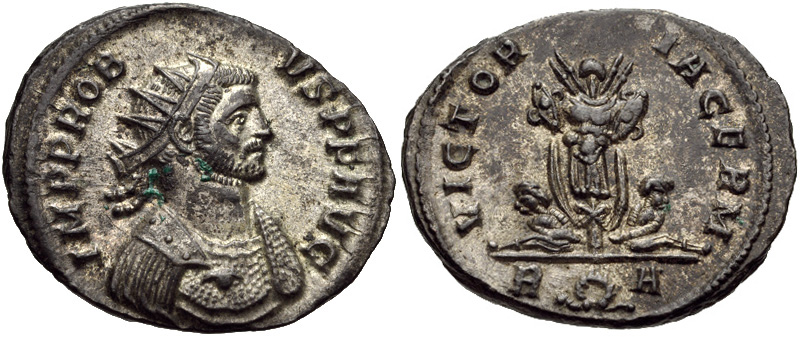
First side of the image: IMP PROB VS P F AVG, head with crown, wearing breastplate;
Second side of the image: VICTOR IA GERM, two German prisoners on the right at the foot of a trophy, with the inscription R A on the bottom and a crown in the center.
22 mm, 3.45 g, coined in 280

281
Probus, on his way back from the East (where he had quelled a Blemmian incursion) to Gaul, found time to settle in Thrace, after a new campaign across the Danube, by as many as one hundred thousand Bastarnae, all of whom held fast to their covenants. Likewise, he transferred to Roman territory many men of other peoples such as Gepids, Greuthungi, and Vandals, who, on the contrary, broke the alliance and, while Probus was busy fighting some usurpers, began wandering over land and sea throughout most of the Empire, to the great detriment of Roman prestige. The suppression of the Gallic revolt and the expulsion of the Germanic bands from the imperial territories lasted a long year of military campaigns; eventually Proculus was captured in a treacherous plot, and then Bonosus hanged himself shortly after in 281.

282
When Probus died in September, the Sarmatian peoples of the Iazyges, who had been subdued a few years earlier, joined the Quadi and resumed hostilities, breaking through the Pannonian limes and endangering Illyricum, Thrace and Italy.

283
The new emperor Marcus Aurelius Carus entrusted the western part of the empire to his eldest son, Marcus Aurelius Carinus, and went east to confront the Sasanians. Carinus, intervening with promptness and determination, succeeded in intercepting the bands of Germano-Sarmatian armies that had broken through the limes into Pannonia and made a great slaughter of them. The Historia Augusta narrates:

[...] in a very few days [Emperor Carus] was able to restore security to Pannonia, killing sixteen thousand Sarmatians and capturing twenty thousand of both sexes.

— Historia Augusta - Carus et Carinus et Numerianus, 9.4.

In commemoration of the victory, he received the appellation "Germanicus maximus" in 284, celebrated a triumph in Rome, and struck coins where some barbarian captives were depicted with the inscription "Triumfus Quadorum." Again, Quadi and Iazigians may have raided the territories of the two Pannonias together, and only the following year would they be finally defeated by Diocletian.

==== Seventh phase: the Tetrarchy of Diocletian and the stabilization of the frontiers (285-305) ====
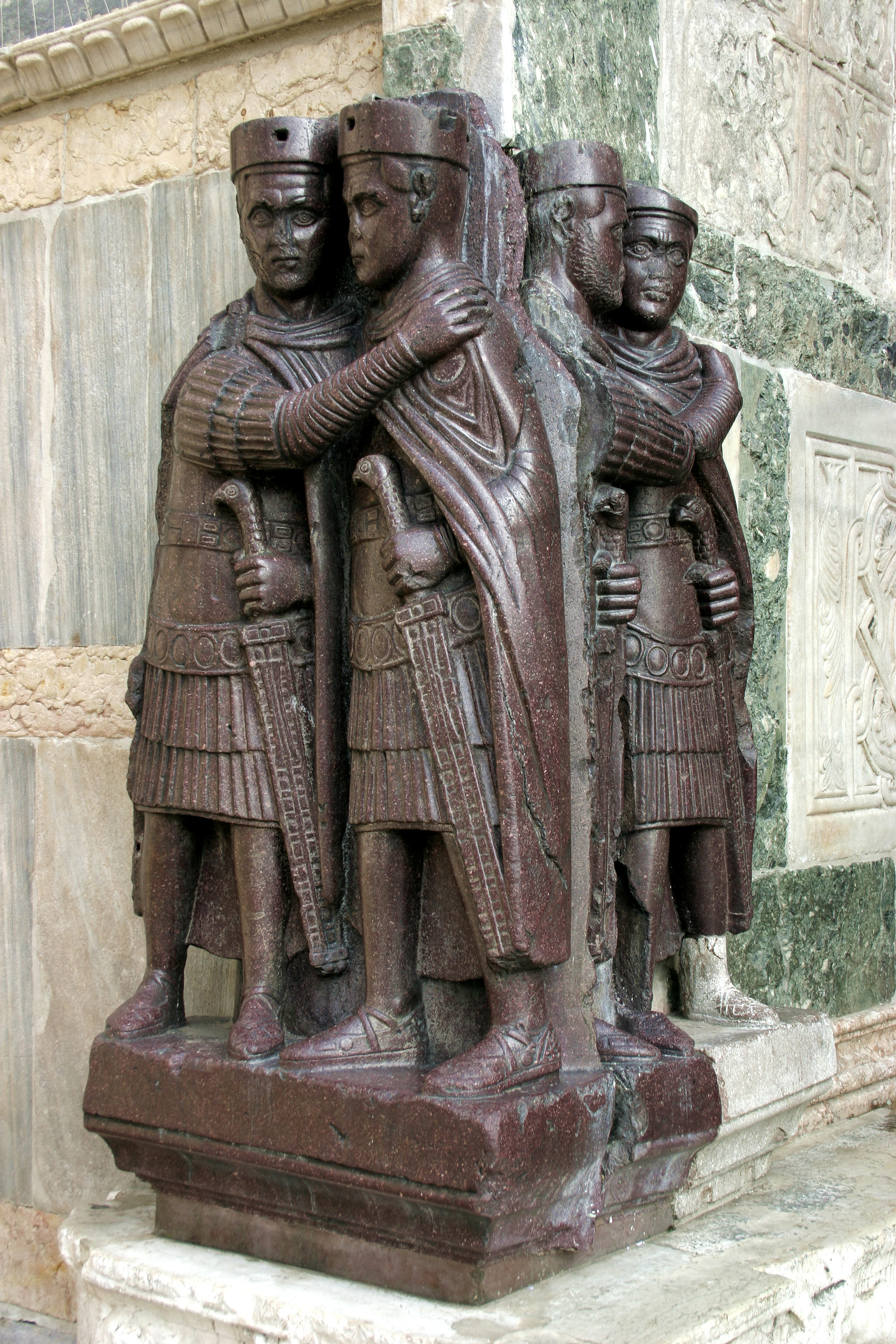
The tetrarchs, a porphyry sculpture looted in Constantinople in 1204 (St. Mark's Basilica in Venice)

With the death of the emperor Numerian in November 284 (to whom his father Carus had entrusted the Roman East), and the subsequent refusal of the eastern troops to recognize Carinus (Carus' eldest son) as their natural successor, Diocletian, a very capable general, was elevated to the imperial purple. The resulting civil war saw Carinus at first prevail over the Pannonian armies of the usurper Julian, and later the defeat of his armies by Diocletian at the Margus River, near the ancient city and legionary fortress of Singidunum. Carinus died due to a conspiracy of his own generals (spring of 285).

Having obtained power, in November 285 Diocletian appointed as his deputy (caesar) a valiant officer, Marcus Aurelius Valerius Maximianus, whom a few months later he elevated to the rank of augustus (April 1, 286): he thus formed a diarchy, in which the two emperors divided on a geographical basis the government of the empire and the responsibility for the defense of the frontiers and the fight against usurpers.

Given the increasing difficulty in containing the numerous revolts within and along the borders, a further territorial division was made in 293 in order to facilitate military operations: Diocletian appointed Galerius as his Caesar for the East, while Maximian did the same with Constantius Chlorus for the West.

285
It fell to the new and sole emperor, Diocletian, to repel new Germano-Sarmatian invasions in both Moesia and Lower Pannonia, once again aided by having unprotected the borders of the lower-middle Danubian tract due to the recent civil war. As a result of these successes he received the appellations "Germanicus maximus" and "Sarmaticus maximus," having decisively beaten Quadi and Iazyges. At the same time Maximian moved into Gaul, first engaging the Bagaudian rebels in the late summer of that year. Details of the campaign are scattered and provide no tactical details. In the fall, two barbarian armies, one of Burgundians and Alemanni, the other of Chaibones and Heruli, forced the Rhine limes and entered Gaul; the first army died of starvation and disease, while Maximian intercepted and defeated the second one. Following these events, the caesar established headquarters on the Rhine in anticipation of future campaigns.

286
The prefect of the English Channel Fleet, the future usurper Carausius, who had the city of Gesoriacum as his main fleet headquarters, succeeded in repelling attacks by Frankish and Saxon pirates along the coasts of Britain and Belgic Gaul, while Maximian defeated Burgundians and Alemanni, as a panegyric of his in 289 suggests.

287
New successes over the Germanic tribes are confirmed by the fact that Diocletian was renewed the appellation "Germanicus maximus" twice during the year. Successes were achieved by the armies of the other augustus, Maximian, against Alemanni and Burgundians on the upper Rhine, as well as Saxons and Franks along the lower course.

288
A new success over the Germanic tribes is confirmed by Diocletian's fourth acclamation as "Germanicus maximus," for the successes achieved by Maximian's generals over both the Alemanni (in a combined action with Diocletian) and the Franks. Maximian had succeeded in capturing the king of the Salian Franks, Genobaud, and in obtaining the return of all Roman prisoners. To complete the work of pacification, he displaced some Franks in the territories surrounding Augusta Treverorum and Bavay.

289
A new success over the Sarmatian tribes is confirmed by the second acclamation received by Diocletian of "Sarmaticus maximus," while another success over the Alemanni was celebrated by the future caesar, Constantius Chlorus.

Galerius: Argenteus
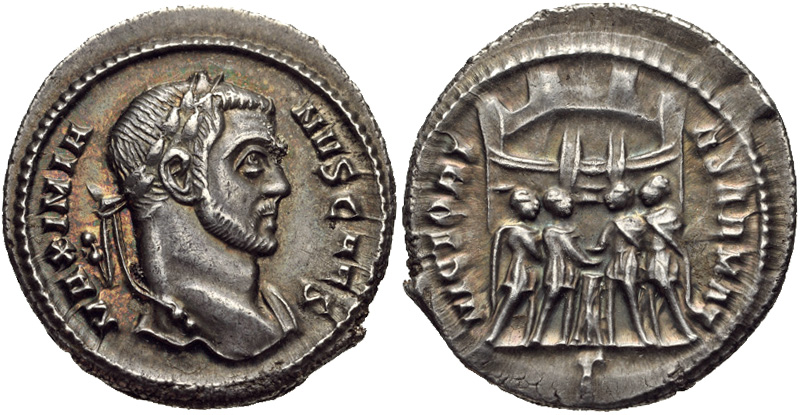
First side of the image: MAXIMIANVS CAES, laureate head right with draped shoulders.
Second side of the image: VICTORIA SARMAT, the four tetrarchs sacrifice above a tripod in front of a city with six towers; Γ below.
18 mm, 3.33 g, coined in 295-297 (celebrating the Sarmatian victory of Galerius in 294).

293
Diocletian's fifth acclamation as "Germanicus maximus" followed the successes reported by Constantius Chlorus, who, after marching up the coast to the Rhine and Scheldt estuaries, reported a victory over the Frankish allies of the rebel Carausius. In October of that same year Diocletian went to Sirmium to organize a new military campaign for the following year against the Iazigi Sarmatians, together with Galerius, specially appointed as Caesar from April 1, 293, in order to better divide the tasks along the imperial frontiers of the Roman East.

294
A new success over the Sarmatian tribes is confirmed by the third acclamation received by Diocletian as "Sarmaticus maximus," as a result of the successes achieved together with Galerius. Also attributable to the same year are other successes over the populations of the Goths.

295
In the course of this year it was the turn of the Carpi. This people was not only defeated by the armies of Diocletian and Galerius, but was also partly transferred to Roman territory, as had already happened in the time of Aurelian.

297
Augustus Maximian was forced to return along the Danubian frontier, having reorganized Britain with his caesar Constantius Chlorus, due to the simultaneous absence of Diocletian and Galerius, who were engaged in the East against the Persians. He succeeded in repelling a Carpi invasion along the lower reaches of the Danube; meanwhile, Constantius repopulated the territory, once inhabited by Batavians, with Salian Franks from Frisia.

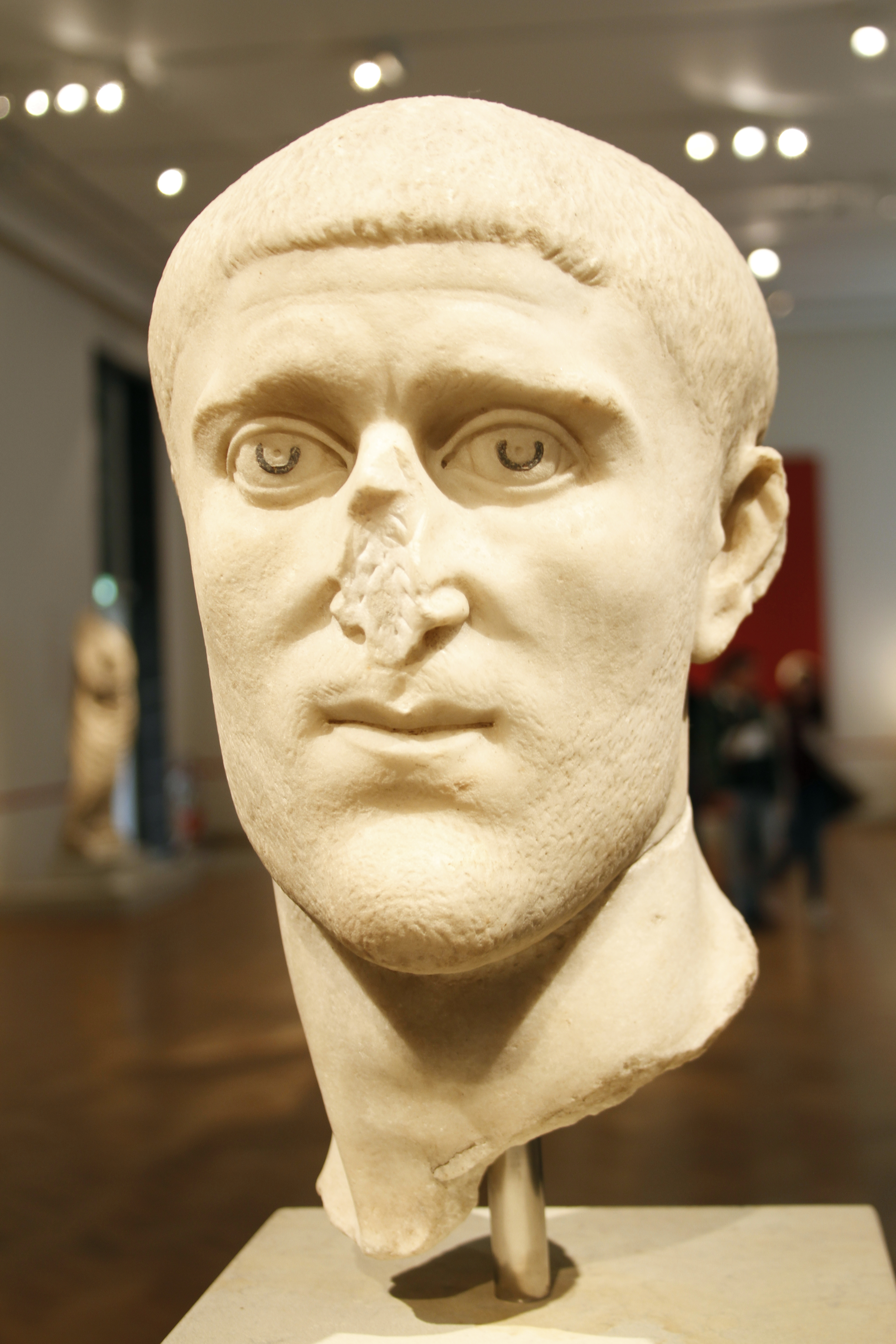
Bust of Caesar Constantius Chlorus.

298
Caesar Constantius Chlorus, who was entrusted with the Rhine frontier, succeeded in beating the coalition of the Alemanni in two major battles (Battle of Lingones and Battle of Vindonissa), strengthening this stretch of the border for at least a few decades.

At the same time Caesar Constantius Chlorus fought in Gaul with good luck. At the Lingons in a single day he experienced bad and good luck. Because the barbarians were advancing fast, he was forced to enter the city, and because of the necessity of closing the gates so quickly, he was hoisted on the walls with ropes, but in only five hours the army arrived and tore to pieces about sixty thousand Alemanni.

— Eutropius, Breviarium ab urbe condita, 9, 23.

During this year, renewed success over the Gothic tribes is confirmed by the acclamation Diocletian received as "Gothicus maximus."

299
Diocletian and Galerius, once the operations in the East were over, concentrated on defending the Danubian borders of Lower Moesia, conducting a campaign against Carpi, Bastarnae and Sarmatians (presumably these were the Roxolani). A large number of individuals belonging to these peoples were taken prisoners and transferred within the imperial borders (to Pannonia north of the Drava River, as Ammianus Marcellinus suggests).

300
The fourth imperial acclamation of "Sarmaticus maximus" was decreed to Diocletian for his successes the previous year over the Sarmatian tribes.

301
A new success over the Germanic tribes is confirmed by the sixth acclamation Diocletian received of "Germanicus maximus."

302
A new battle was fought near Vindonissa, where, once again, the Roman armies prevailed over those of the Alemanni and Burgundians, but this may have been the same battle fought in 298.

=== African southern front: from Mauretania to Egypt ===
Also along the fourth and final frontier sector of the Roman Empire, the southern one, were numerous and continuous incursions by semi-nomadic African peoples, beginning in the mid-3rd century. This sector, which had always been protected to the south by the natural barrier of the Sahara Desert, and thus poorly manned by armies, was forced, like the other three, to defend itself against the growing pressure of Berber peoples.

261-262
The then prefect of Egypt, Mussius Aemilianus, succeeded in driving out the Berber tribes of Blemmyes, who had invaded Thebaid.

c. 269-270
Marcus Aurelius Probus fought in these years against the Marmarid people on the borders of the province of Africa, defeating them, and then went to the territories that had once belonged to Carthage and liberated them from the rebels. At the same time, the southern front of the Egyptian province suffered a second invasion by the Berber tribe of Blemmyes first, and a permanent occupation by the queen of the kingdom of Palmyra, Zenobia, later on.

279-280
Probus faced, through his generals, a new invasion by Blemmyes in Egypt, who had occupied and enslaved the border cities of Qift and Ptolemais.

290
Mention is first made of the Saracens, an Arab tribe settled in the Sinai Peninsula, who had attempted to invade Syria; they were defeated by Diocletian's armies.

293
A war broke out against the Quinquegentians, which was quelled only four years later by Maximian.

296-298
By the end of 296, the augustus Maximian, who set out for Mauretania (with an army consisting of contingents from the Praetorian Guard, legionaries from Aquileia, Egyptians and Danubians, Gaulish and German auxiliaries, and recruits from Thrace), succeeded in repelling the tribes of the Moors and in defeating that of the Quinquegentians, who had also penetrated Numidia. In 297 Maximian began a bloody offensive against the Berbers. The campaign was a long one. Not content with driving them back to their homelands in the Atlas Mountains, from where they could have continued their attacks, Maximian ventured deep into enemy territory inflicting as much damage on them as possible for punitive purposes, and devastating their territories and driving them back as far as the Sahara. The following year (298) he reinforced the defenses of the African frontier from the Mauritanias to the province of Africa.

298
A revolt that arose in Egypt was suppressed by Diocletian. At its end, circulation along the Red Sea coast was restored, but the Triakontaschoinos territories were abandoned and given to the Nobatians as federates against the Blemmyes.

== Consequences ==
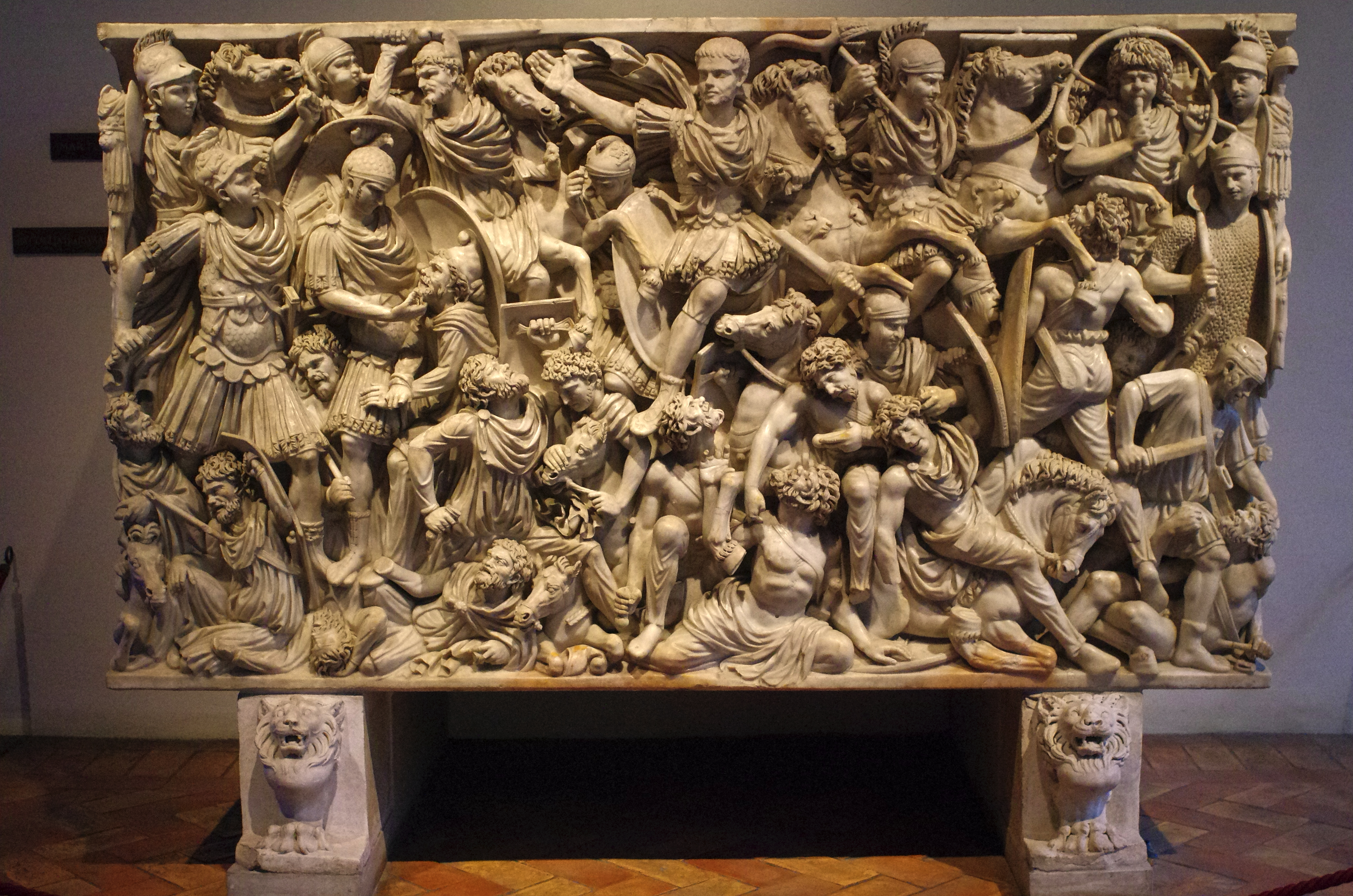
Ludovisi sarcophagus. Altemps Palace. Battle scenes between Romans and Germans. The main character is probably Hostilian, son of Emperor Decius. Proconnesian marble, Roman work, c. 250 AD.

In the crisis that the Empire experienced in the third century, barbarian invasions undoubtedly constituted an extremely important element in the political, social, and economic evolution that led to the new Diocletian and Constantinian state. After two centuries of apparent calm along the western and eastern borders, from the beginning of the century populations of different ethnicities, mostly Germanic, engaged Roman forces in long and exhausting campaigns of containment, often fruitless, sometimes catastrophic. Since the time of Hadrian, it had been decided in Rome, out of expediency or prudence, to stop venturing into the conquest of new territories and to take precautions along the thousands of kilometers that constituted the Empire's limes; this was not enough, however, and already with Marcus Aurelius, the Marcomanni reached Italy and pushed as far as Aquileia, the heart of Venetia, causing a huge impact: it had been since the time of Marius that a barbarian population had not besieged centers in northern Italy.

The cadence with which the barbarian incursions followed one another from the third decade of the century onward constituted only the most conspicuous consequence of a phenomenon that had been going on for several decades, causes and consequences of which were both internal and external to the Roman world. While it is well true that from the end of the second century onward the migrations of Germanic peoples accentuated their westward reach, it is equally true that until then the Empire's system of defence-in-depth had held up more or less admirably, through fortifications, legions, and patronage alliances. However, in the face of increasing pressure on the borders, the center of Roman power found itself in difficulty: after a century the imperial purple again became with Septimius Severus a conquest of arms.

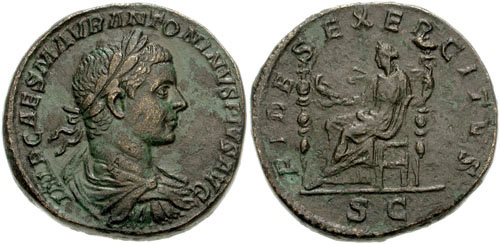
A denarius of Heliogabalus, with the inscription fides exercitus

Inevitably, the coexistence of internal political uncertainty and external military difficulties resulted in the destabilization of the entire apparatus of power; the army became the sole arbiter of Roman politics, effectively depriving the already agonizing Senate of its power. Thus, for Augustus and his successors Concordia ordinum was the slogan of the new system; in the third century imperial coinage relentlessly bore the words "Fides exercitus." The principate, understood by Mommsen as a military dictatorship characterized by the figure of the prince, the Senate and the army, lost an essential element in the delicate balance established by Octavian. Although, as early as the Year of the Four Emperors, the most attentive observers noted with regret that the emperor could well elect himself far from Rome, by the third century this circumstance became routine. In the face of external threats, military commanders endowed with ever-increasing powers had an easy time being acclaimed augusti by an army aware of its decisive role in choosing princes; if before the praetorian cohorts had their decisive weight in this regard, now the new situation created along the borders of the Empire undoubtedly privileged the limitanean legions, revolutionizing a balance that had seen, in the first two centuries of the Empire, the praetorian cohorts represent, in their own ranks, a good part of the municipal Italic elites and of the provinces of ancient Romanization.

From the advent of Maximinus the Thracian, there was instead a gradual but ineluctable change of direction; figures who were expressions of the army, the viri militares, often of modest origin and raised in the ranks of the legions of the limes, obtained roles and powers that had previously been reserved for members of senatorial, Italic or provincial families. It was from the armies most engaged on the containment front that these men arose; and among them, the broad Danubian and Pannonian sector in particular brought forth emperors such as Decius, Claudius the Gothic, Probus, and Valentinian I. Although of greater importance, the Danubian area was not the only cradle of emperors and usurpers, and the lack of a strong central power in Rome represented by the Senate caused on more than one occasion the momentary disintegration of the Empire, as in the case of the Gallic Empire and the Kingdom of Palmyra. However, this also showed that the defense of the Empire could by then no longer be entrusted to one man, unless the entire administrative structure of the provinces was revolutionized: something that, once the storm had passed, Diocletian tried to implement.

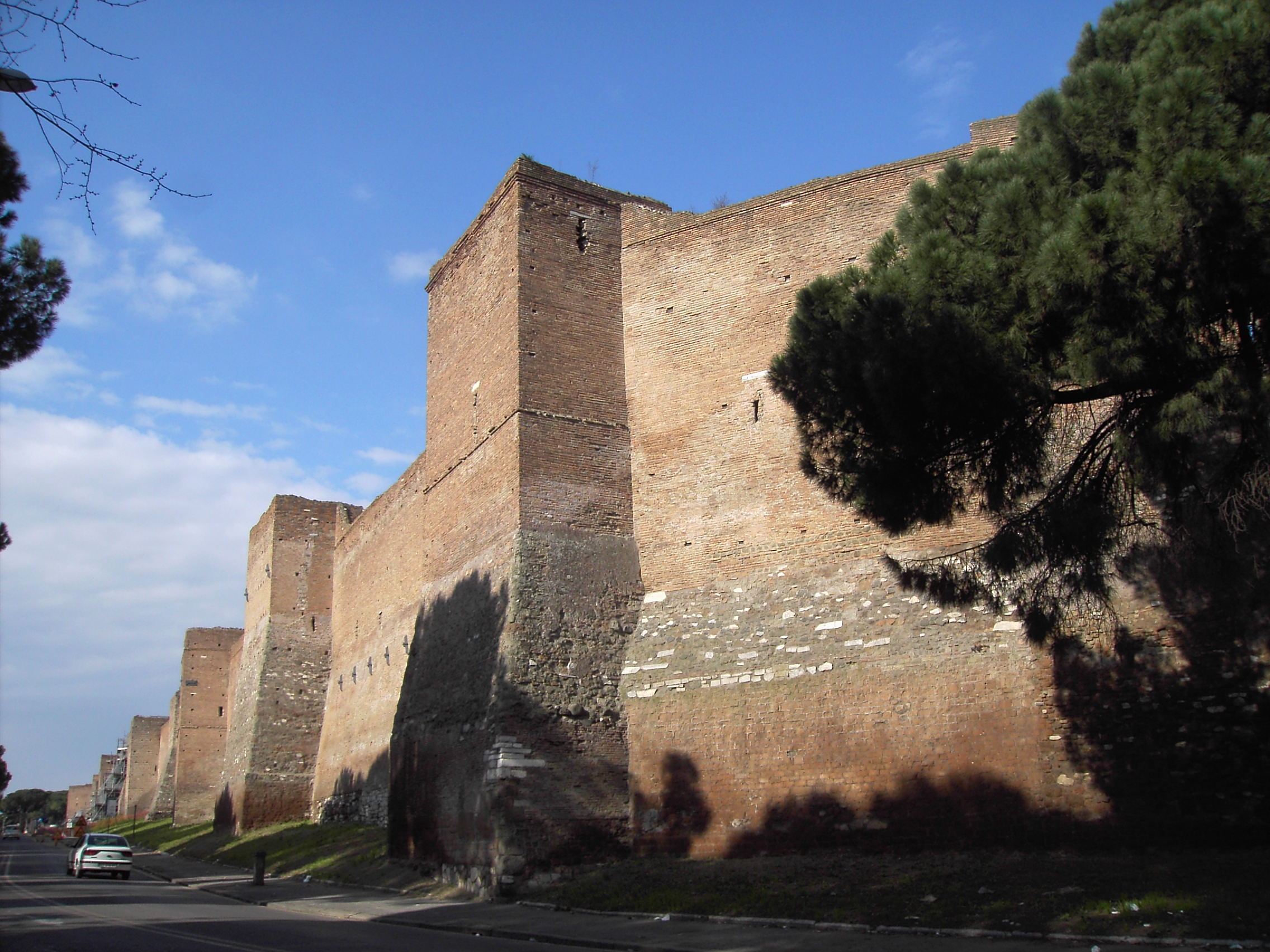
Aurelian Walls between Porta San Sebastiano and Porta Ardeatina

The slow ousting of the senatorial class from military leadership had a turning point with Gallienus, who went on to entrust such positions to figures of equestrian rank, who had come out of the army after a long career: they anticipated and gave rise to those duces who from the end of the century replaced the provincial governor in the defense of the borders. Inevitably, the growing burden of the army, accompanied by political instability and the struggle for power, caused a monetary decline due, moreover, to the long-standing lack of liquidity from the conquests of previous centuries. A growing tax burden affected the ruling classes of the municipalities and colonies, setting the stage for the contraction of the urban fabric as documented for the fourth century. Private evergetism, the real driving force behind the redistribution of wealth in the centers of the empire, gradually came to a standstill. Silver, which was along with the denarii the most widespread currency, slowly declined, so much so that it caused the inflation that was at the center of every emperor's thoughts in the third century, and which Diocletian tried in vain to save with his Edictum De Pretiis Rerum Venalium. Constantine understood that gold would be the dominant metal of the new course.

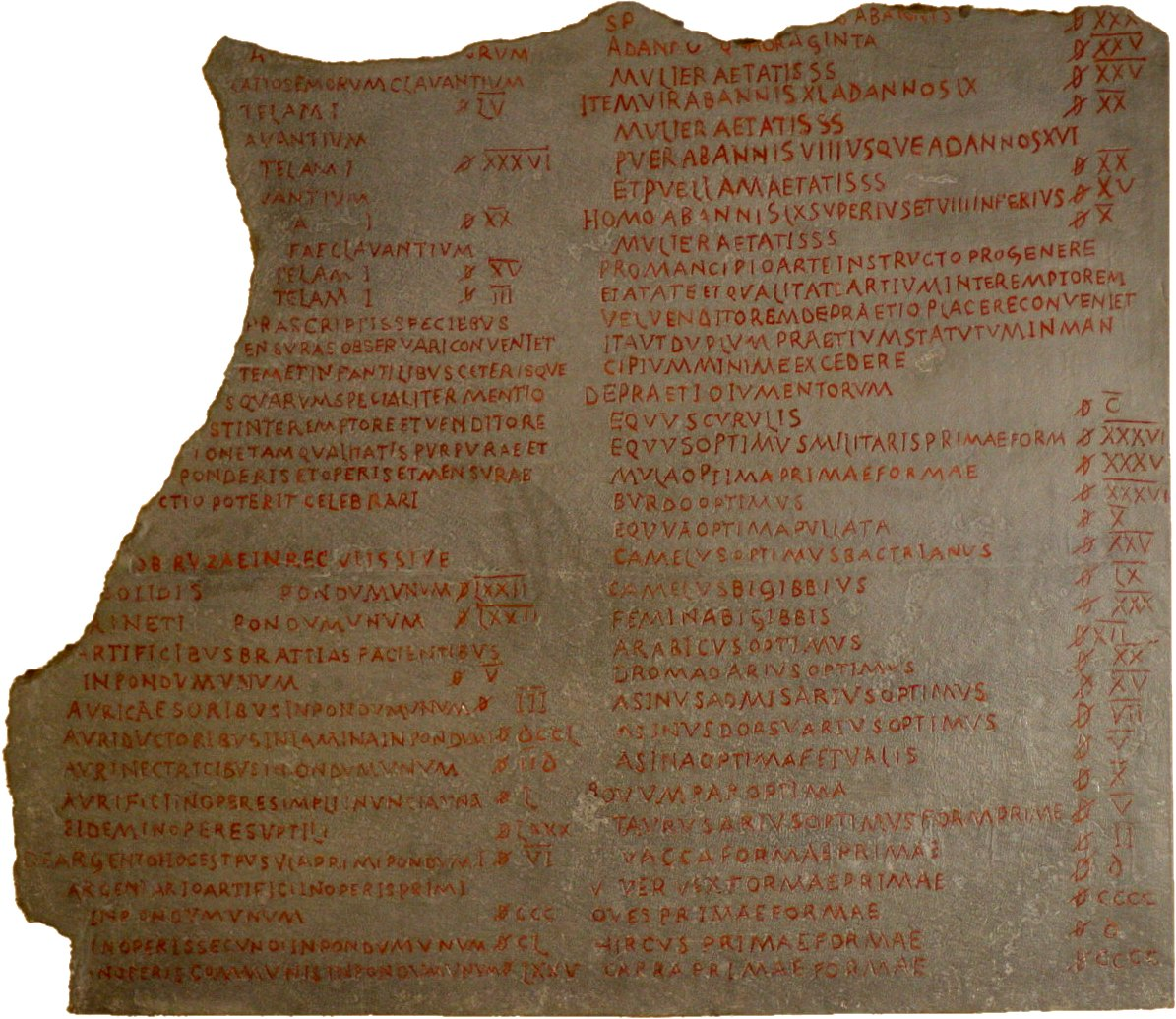
Fragment of Diocletian's edict on prices, from the Pergamon Museum in Berlin.

However, in this climate of continuous internal and limitaneous alertness, not all cities suffered from the aforementioned economic contraction: other centers, which had previously been nothing more than legion headquarters, became during the third century the new capitals of the Empire. Augusta Treverorum, Sirmium, Mediolanum were the habitual seats of the emperors.

The effort undertaken by the successive augusts during the third century, either because of the lack of a long-term plan or because of the economic crisis that affected the Roman tributary system, failed to save the integrity of the Empire as it stood at the end of the second century: in particular the province of Dacia, and the so-called Agri Decumates between Germania and Rhaetia were abandoned. The Empire was now entirely west of the two great European rivers, the Rhine and the Danube. It was clear that any effort to maintain the status quo would not produce results within the institutional framework created in its time by Augustus: a new era was coming, and although the barbarian invasions had not by themselves caused the crisis of the third century, they accelerated the process of disintegration and estrangement between West and East that would be the basis of Late Antiquity. Rome, for its part, lost during the third century its role as caput mundi: the frontiers were never so distant and so close at the same time. Aurelian was convinced to endow the city with walls; seven centuries had passed since the last stone was laid to defend the city.

== See also ==
- Migration Period
- Marcomannic Wars
- Crisis of the Third Century

== Bibliography ==
Ancient sources

- Ammianus Marcellinus, Res Gestae, book XXVII HERE.
- Aurelius Victor, Epitome de Caesaribus e De Vita et Moribus Imperatorum Romanorum HERE.
- Corpus Inscriptionum Latinarum.
- Dio, Roman History, LXXVII HERE.
- Dexippus, Scythica, fragments 6 and 7.
- Herodian, History of the Empire after Marcus Aurelius.
- Eutropius, Breviarium ab Urbe condita, IX HERE.
- Jordanes, De origine actibusque Getarum.
- George Syncellus, Extract of Chronography.
- Gregory of Tours, History of the Franks, book II.
- Historia Augusta, from Caracalla to Diocletian.
- Panegyrici Latini, II-VII HERE.
- Orosius, Historiarum adversus paganos libri septem, book 7 HERE.
- Procopius of Caesarea, Persian, Vandal, and Gothic Wars, I.
- Roman Imperial Coinage:
  - volume 4a: from Pertinax to Geta et Caracalla (193 – 217), H. Mattingly, E.A. Sydenham, London, 1936;
  - volume 4b: Macrinus to Pupienus (217 – 238), H. Mattingly, E.A. Sydenham, C.H.V. Sutherland, London, 1930;
  - volume 4c: Gordian III to Uranius Antoninus (238 – 253), H. Mattingly, E.A. Sydenham, C.H.V. Sutherland, London, 1949;
  - volume 5a: Valerian to Florian (253 – 276), Percy H. Webb, London, 1927;
  - volume 5b: Probus to Maximian (276 – 310), Percy H. Webb, London, 1933.
- Strabo, Geographica HERE.
- Tacitus, Histories, I HERE.
- Zosimus, New History, I.

Modern historiographical literature

- Actes du colloque de Strasbourg (11-13 octobre 1990) (1998). Les empereurs illyriens (in French). Strasburgo: ed.par Edmond Frézouls et Hélène Jouffroy.
- Vari, Autori (2008). Roma e i Barbari, la nascita di un nuovo mondo. Milano: catalogo della mostra di Palazzo Grassi a Venezia, a cura di Jean-Jacques Aillagon.
- Vari, Autori (2001). Das römische Trier (in German). Stoccarda.
- Vari, Autori (1993). L'"inflazione " nel quarto secolo d. C. Roma: atti dell'incontro di studio Roma 1988.
- Géza Alföldy (1974). Noricum. London: Routledge & Kegan Paul.
- Barnes, Timothy (1981). Constantine and Eusebius. Cambridge: MA Harvard University Press. ISBN 978-0-674-16530-4.
- Barnes, Timothy (1982). The New Empire of Diocletian and Constantine. Cambridge: MA Harvard University Press. ISBN 978-0-674-61126-9.
- Bowman, Alan K. (2005). Diocletian and the First Tetrarchy. Cambridge: The Cambridge Ancient History, Volume XII: The Crisis of Empire, a cura di Alan Bowman, Averil Cameron, e Peter Garnsey.
- Beyer, Jeorgios Martin (2002). Gregorios Thaumaturgos und die pontischen Beutezuge der Boran und Goten im 3.Jh.n.Chr (in German). Oxford: in 18th International Congress of Roman Frontier Studies, a cura di P.Freeman, J.Bennett, Z.T.Fiema e B.Hoffmann.
- Cameron, Averil (1995). Il tardo impero romano. Milano.
- Carrié, Jean-Michel (2008). Eserciti e strategie. Milano: in Storia dei Greci e dei Romani, vol. 18, La Roma tardo-antica, per una preistoria dell'idea di Europa.
- Corbier, Mireille (1986). A. Giardina (ed.). Svalutazioni, inflazione e circolazione monetaria nel III secolo, Società romana e impero tardoantico, I : Istituzioni, ceti, economie. Roma-Bari.
- Corradi, Giuseppe (1994). Gli imperatori romani. Torino.
- Crees, James (2005). The Reign of the Emperor Probus. Londra.
- Dobiaš, Giuseppe (1938). Il limes romano nelle terre della Repubblica Cecoslovacca, vol. VIII. Roma: Istituto Studi Romani.
- Duval, Noel (1979). Sirmium ville impériale ou capitale? (in French). «CCAB» 26.
- Michael Geschwinde; Petra Lönne (October 2012). La spedizione dimenticata (Archeo, attualità dal passato, N.332 ed.).
- González, Julio Rodríguez (2003). Historia de las legiones Romanas (in Spanish). Madrid.
- Grant, Michel (1984). Gli imperatori romani, storia e segreti. Roma.
- Jackson, Robert B. (2002). At Empire's Edge. Exploring Rome's Egyptian Frontier. New Haven & Londra: Yale Univ.Press.
- Jones, Arnold Hugh Martin (1986). The Later Roman Empire: 284-602. Baltimora.
- Kreucher, Gerald (2003). Der Kaiser Marcus Aurelius Probus und seine Zeit (in German). Stoccarda. ISBN 978-3-515-08382-9.
- Le Bohec, Yann (2001). L'esercito romano: le armi imperiali da Augusto alla fine del 3. secolo. Roma: Carocci.
- Le Bohec, Yann (2004). Les aspects militaires de la crise du IIIe siècle, L'armée romaine de Dioclétien à Valentinien Ier: actes du congrès de Lyon (12-14 septembre 2002) (in French). Lione: rassemblés et éd. par Y. Le Bohec et C. Wolff.
- Le Bohec, Yann (2008). Armi e guerrieri di Roma antica. Da Diocleziano alla caduta dell'impero. Roma.
- Magie, David (1950). Roman Rule in Asia Minor to the End of the Third Century After Christ. Princeton.
- Mazzarino, Santo (1973). L'impero romano, vol. I. Bari.
- Mazzarino, Santo (1973). L'impero romano, vol II. Bari.
- Mócsy, András (1974). Pannonia and Upper Moesia. Londra.
- Mommsen, Theodor (1887). Römische Staatsrecht, vol. II (in German). Leipzig.
- Oliva, Pavel (1962). Pannonia and the Onset of Crisis in the Roman Empire. Praga.
- Popescu, Grigore (1998). Traiano ai confini dell'Impero. Milano.
- David S. Potter (2013). The Roman Empire at Bay: AD 180–395. New York: Routledge.
- Rees, Roger (2002). Layers of Loyalty in Latin Panegyric: AD 289–307. New York: Oxford University Press.
- Rémondon, Roger (1975). La crisi dell'impero romano, da Marco Aurelio ad Anastasio. Milano.
- Room, Adrian (2005). Placenames of the World: Origins and Meanings of the Names for 6,600 Countries, Cities, Territories, Natural Features and Historic Sites. North Carolina & London: McFarland & Company, Inc. Publishers, Jefferson.
- Giorgio Ruffolo (2004). Quando l'Italia era una superpotenza (in Italian). Torino: Einaudi. ISBN 978-88-06-16804-9.
- Scarre, Chris (1999). Chronicle of the Roman Emperors. New York.
- Schönberger, H. (1969). The Roman Frontier in Germany: an Archaeological Survey, in Journal of Roman studies. Londra.
- Sordi, Marta (1991). Marta Sordi (ed.). Come Milano divenne capitale, in L'impero romano-cristiano: problemi politici, religiosi, culturali. Roma.
- Pat Southern (2001). The Roman Empire: from Severus to Constantine. Londra & New York.
- Springer, Matthias (1988). Die angebliche Heeresreform des Kaisers Gallienus, Krise, Krisenbewusstsein, Krisenbewältigung. Ideologie und geistige Kultur im Imperium Romanum während des 3. Jahrhunderts (in German). Halle: Konferenzvorträge.
- Watson, Alaric (1999). Aurelian and the Third Century. Londra & New York.
- Williams, Stephen (1995). Diocleziano. Un autocrate riformatore. Genova.

Further historiographical insights

- D. van Berchem, Les routes et l'histoire, 1982
- J.-P. Petit, Atlas des agglomérations secondaires de la Gaule Belgique et des Germanies, 1994
- K. Kob, Out of Rome, 1997

Historical novels about the invasions of the 3rd century

- Cervo, Guido (2002). Il legato romano. Casale Monferrato.
- Cervo, Guido (2003). La legione invincibile. Casale Monferrato. ISBN 978-88-384-7063-9.
- Cervo, Guido (2004). L'onore di Roma. Casale Monferrato. ISBN 978-88-384-8183-3.
