= Gothic wars =

Series of conflicts between the Goths and the Roman Empire from the 3rd-6th centuries AD

Gothic Wars
- Part of the Roman–Germanic Wars
Date	236 – 554
Location	Balkans, Italy, Gaul and Iberia

Belligerents
236–395; Roman Empire 285–476; Western Roman Empire 330–554; Byzantine Empire	Goths; Visigoths; Ostrogoths; Thervingi; Greuthungi

The Gothic Wars were a long series of conflicts between the Goths and the Roman Empire between the years 249 and 554. The main wars are detailed below.

== History ==
=== Crisis of the Third Century ===
Map of the invasions 250–251

During the Crisis of the Third Century, Goths under Cniva fought against the Roman Empire between 248 and 253. The War was probably instigated after emperor Decius's predecessor Philip the Arab had refused to continue payments of annual subsidies to the tribes of the region initiated by Emperor Maximinus Thrax in 238 while they were starving. The Goths were led by King Cniva who had crossed the Danube in 249 or 250 with a number of units, however, the exact number is unknown. Cniva's main column of 70,000 unsuccessfully attacked Novae and were then defeated by Decius at the Battle of Nicopolis ad Istrum before moving on to Augusta Traiana pursued by Decius where at the Battle of Beroe they defeated him and looted the city. Decius was forced to withdraw his army north to Oescus leaving Cniva ample time to ravage Moesia and move on to Philippopolis (Thracia) (now Plovdiv in Bulgaria). Another army of about 20,000 besieged Marcianopolis without success. Then the forces headed south to besiege Philippopolis. The battle of Philippopolis was fought in 250 or 251 and after a long siege of the city the Goths were victorious. King Cniva subsequently allied himself with the town commander and governor of Thrace, Titus Julius Priscus, to take on the Roman Emperor Decius. The Battle of Abritus of 251 resulted, at which Decius and his son Herennius Etruscus were killed.

Map of the invasions 267–269

The greatest Gothic invasion so far occurred in 268. The Goths' seaborne allies, the Heruli, supplied a fleet carrying huge armies along the coast of the Black Sea where they ravaged coastal territories in Thrace and Macedonia. Other huge forces crossed the Danube in Moesia. In 268, Emperor Gallienus won some important initial victories at land and sea, but it was his successor Claudius II who finally defeated the invaders at the Battle of Naissus in 269.

=== Fourth century ===
==== Gothic War: 367–369 ====
The Gothic king Ermanaric of a large powerful kingdom north of the Danube from the Black Sea, had engaged to supply the usurper Procopius with troops for the struggle against Roman Emperor Valens. The Gothic army, reportedly numbering 30,000 men, arrived too late to help Procopius, but nevertheless invaded Thrace and began plundering the farms and vineyards of the province. Valens, marching north after defeating Procopius, surrounded them with a superior force and forced them to surrender. In the spring of 367, Valens crossed the Danube and attacked the Visigoths under Athanaric. The Goths fled into the Carpathian Mountains, and the campaign ended with no decisive conclusion. The following spring, a Danube flood prevented Valens from crossing; instead he had his troops construct fortifications. In 369, Valens crossed again, from Noviodunum, and by devastating the country forced Athanaric to attack him. Valens was victorious, and Athanaric received Ermanaric's permission to conclude a truce. Athanaric pleaded for treaty terms and Valens gladly obliged. The treaty seems to have largely cut off relations between Goths and Romans, confining trade and the exchange of troops for tribute.

==== Gothic War: 376–378 ====
Greuthungi and Thervingi fought against Valens' Eastern Roman Empire between 376 and 382. Between about 376 and 382 the Gothic War against the Eastern Roman Empire, and in particular the Battle of Adrianople, in which the emperor Valens was killed, is commonly seen as important in the history of the Roman Empire, the first of a series of events over the next century that would see the collapse of the Western Roman Empire, although its ultimate importance to the Empire's eventual fall is still debated.

==== Gothic revolts: 397–400 ====
The Gothic revolt of Alaric I in 395–398 and the revolt of Tribigild and Gainas in 399–400 in the Eastern Roman Empire caused a major political crisis during the reign of Emperor Arcadius (395–408). Alaric's rebellion was prompted by dissatisfaction among the Goths due to failed Roman agreements. The conflict occurred in the Balkans and the Gothic uprising led to the intervention of the Western army in the east. The other uprising was led by Tribigild, leader of a unit of Goths within the Roman army. Initially, the uprising only took place in Anatolia, but after the commander-in-chief of the Eastern Roman army Gainas intervened and sided with the Goths, it became a threat to the unity within the Eastern empire.

=== Fifth century and later ===
The rebel Goths of Alaric fought against the Western Roman Empire. In 401 his Goths invaded Italy, but were defeated by Stilicho at Pollentia (modern Pollenza) on April 6, 402. A second invasion that same year also ended in defeat at the Battle of Verona, though Alaric forced the Roman Senate to pay a large subsidy to the Visigoths, and devastated Greece. Later, Alaric led the Sack of Rome (410). The War of Radagaisus was a military conflict in northern Italy caused by the invasion of Radagaisus in 405. He invaded the Western Roman Empire with a huge population shortly after the empire had ended a war with the Visigoths. Due to the size of Radagaisus's army, it required a tremendous effort by the Romans to avert this danger. Commander-in-chief Stilicho was closely involved in the preparations and personally directed the army's operations.

==== Gothic revolts 425–430 ====
An uprising of the Gothic foederati in Aquitaine took place during the regime of Emperor Valentinian III (425–455), between 425 and 426. That rebellion was led by Theodoric I, King of the Visigoths and took place in the South of France. It followed the death of usurpator John and was terminated by a military procedure under the command of Aëtius. A new uprising arose in 430. This time was Theodoric not involved but Anaolsus the initiator of the Gothic revolt. Again the revolt was smashed down by Aetius.

==== Gothic War 436-439 ====
In the mid-430s, a long term uprising broke out, which resulted in a four-year Gothic War between the Goths and Romans in southern Gaul. The Western Roman Empire was then confronted with several armed conflicts within its borders. Again Theodoric I was the instigator of this war. After a varying course of the war, the war was terminated by Aetius in the Battle of Toulouse (439).

Visigoths under Theodoric II also fought against the Western Roman Empire under Majorian. In late 458 Majorian entered Septimania (now southern France) to attack Theodoric and reclaim the province for the empire. Majorian defeated Theodoric at the Battle of Arelate, forcing him to abandon Septimania and withdraw west to Aquitania. Under the new treaty with the Romans, the Visigoths had to relinquish their recent conquests in Hispania and return to federate status.

==== Gothic War 462-463 ====
This conflict took place during the civil war that broke out shortly after the assassination of Emperor Majorian, and can be seen as a direct result of this. The war was ended by Aegidius in the Battle of Orleans.

==== Revolt of Euric ====
The revolt of Euric between 468 and 471 marked the collapse of Roman authority in southern Gaul and led to the establishment of an independent Visigothic kingdom centered on Toulouse.

=== Franco-Visigothic Wars ===
Multiple wars occurred between the Franks and the Visigoths, also involving the Burgundians, the Ostrogoths and the Romans. The most noteworthy war of the conflict would be the Franco-Gothic War that included the famous Battle of Vouillé and resulted in Frankish annexation of most of Southern France.

==== Gothic War: 535–554 ====
The Gothic War, between the Byzantine Empire (Eastern Roman) during the reign of Emperor Justinian I and the Ostrogothic Kingdom of Italy took place from 535 until 554 in the Italian peninsula, Dalmatia, Sardinia, Sicily and Corsica. Historians commonly divide the war into two phases: from 535 to 540, ending with the fall of the Ostrogothic capital Ravenna and the apparent reconquest of Italy by the Byzantines; and from 540/541 to 553, a Gothic revival under Totila, suppressed only after a long struggle by the Byzantine general Narses, who also repelled an invasion in 554 by the Franks and Alamanni.
