= Battle of Nicopolis ad Istrum =

Battle between Roman and Gothic forces (250)

- Part of the Crisis of the Third Century; Roman–Gothic Wars and Roman–Germanic Wars
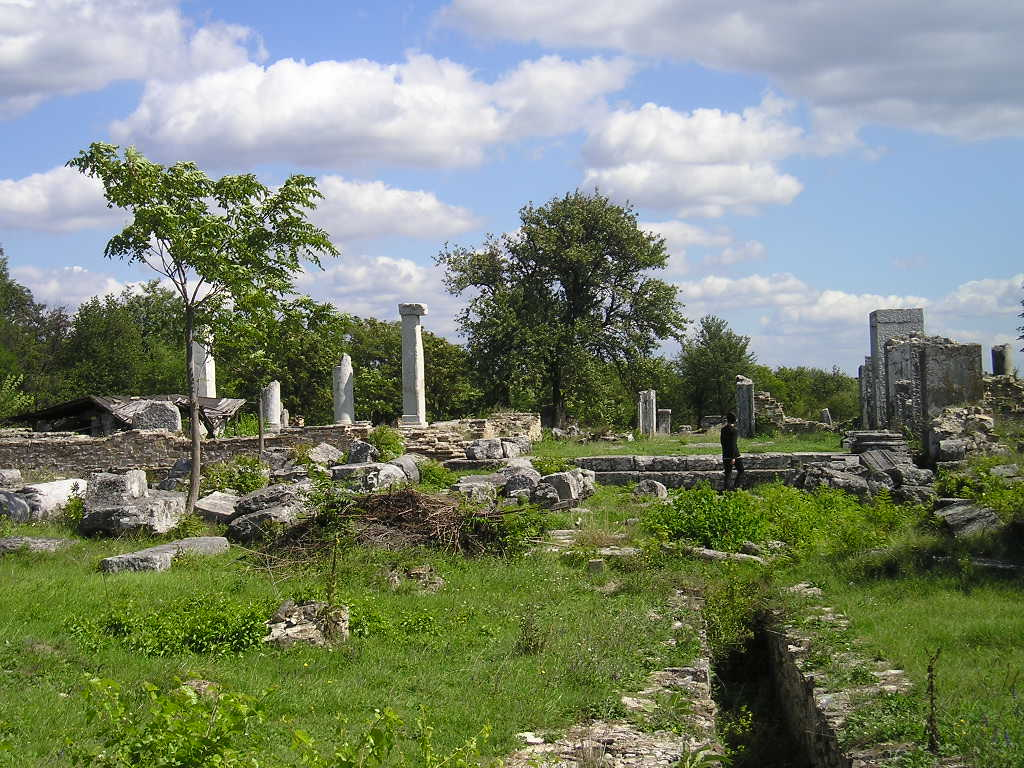
- Roman ruins at Nicopolis ad Istrum
Date	Summer 250 AD
Location	Nicopolis ad Istrum, Roman Empire (modern-day near Nikyup of Veliko Tarnovo, Bulgaria)
Result	Roman victory

Belligerents
Roman Empire	Goths

Commanders and leaders
Decius; Herennius Etruscus	Cniva

Strength
Unknown	Unknown

Casualties and losses
Unknown	Unknown

The Battle of Nicopolis ad Istrum was fought between the Roman army of Emperor Decius and his son Herennius Etruscus, and the Gothic army of King Cniva, in 250. The Romans were victorious.

== Prelude ==
In 250, the Goths, led by their king Cniva, attacked the Roman province of Moesia. Roman emperor Decius and his son Herennius Etruscus led their army to Moesia. The Goths were, at the same time, marching to attack the Roman city of Philippopolis. The Romans intercepted them near Nicopolis ad Istrum.

== Battle ==
The Romans intercepted the Goths just before they could reach Nicopolis. Decius and Herennius launched a surprise attack on the Goths while they were marching. The Romans took the disorganized Goths by surprise, fighting hard and gaining the upper hand quickly. Caught off guard, the Goths could not respond to the attack, and so were defeated.

6th century Byzantine scholar Jordanes described Cniva's defeat:

When the Emperor Decius drew near, Cniva, with his army still in good shape, at last withdrew to the Balkan Mountains, which were not far distant.

== Aftermath ==
The Romans defeated the Goths, but not decisively. Cniva's army marched in good order to besiege Philippopolis. Decius moved through the Shipka Pass to intercept him but was ambushed and heavily defeated by Cniva near Beroe at the Battle of Beroe. Decius fled to Novae to link up with governor Trebonianus Gallus. Cniva mounted failed attacks on Philippopolis' walls and then negotiated a truce with the city's ambitious governor, Titus Julius Priscus. The Goths broke the truce, however, and sacked the city. In 251 AD, Cniva defeated three Roman legions at the Battle of Abritus, and Decius and Herennius were both killed.
