= Siege of Philippopolis (250) =

Battle between Roman and Gothic forces (250)

Coordinates: 42°9′0″N 24°45′0″E

- Part of the Crisis of the Third Century; Gothic War (248-253) and Roman–Germanic Wars
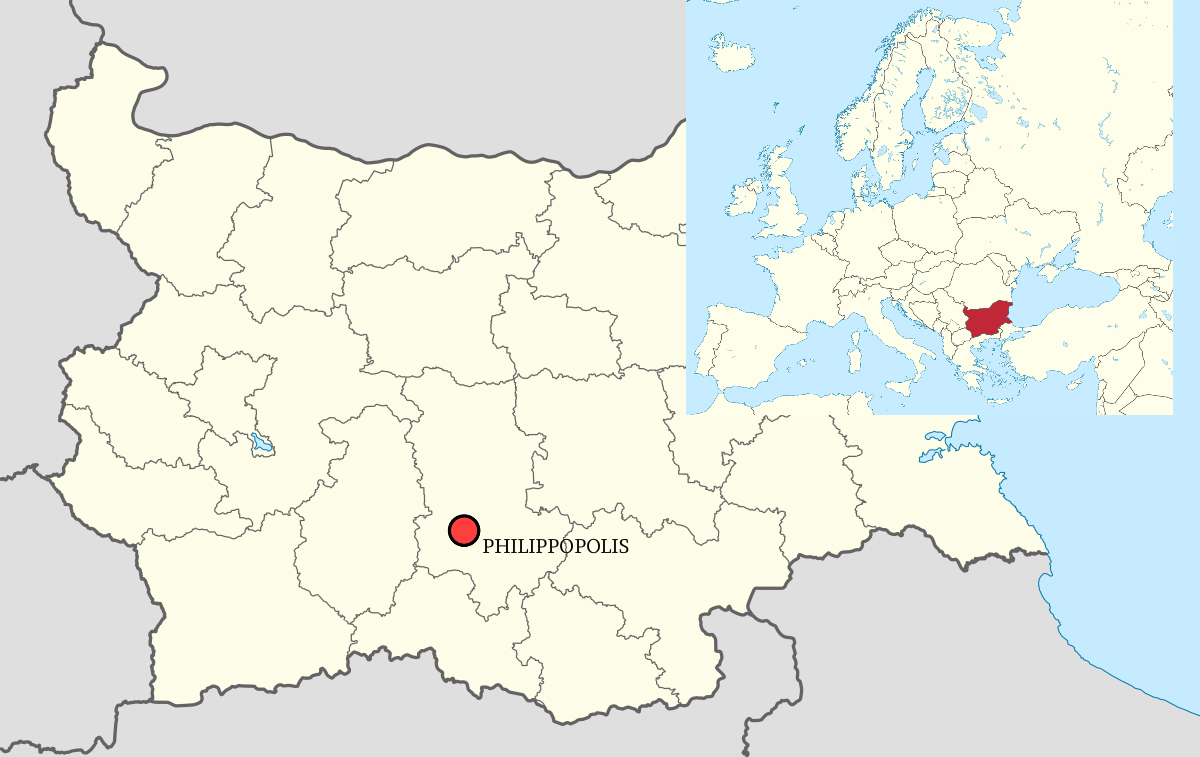
- Location of Philippopolis
Date	250 or 251 AD
Location	Philippopolis, Thracia, Roman Empire (present-day Plovdiv, Bulgaria)
Result	Gothic victory

Belligerents
Goths	Roman Empire

Commanders and leaders
Cniva	Titus Julius Priscus (executed)

Strength
Unknown	Unknown

Casualties and losses
Unknown	Unknown

The siege of Philippopolis was fought in about 250 between Rome and the Goths during the invasions of 249–253 at the Thracian city of Philippopolis, modern Plovdiv, Bulgaria. It was part of the long-running series of Gothic Wars.

The Goths were led by King Cniva who had crossed the Danube in 249 or 250 with two armies. His army attacked Novae and Nicopolis ad Istrum unsuccessfully before defeating the army of Emperor Decius at Augusta Traiana and moving on to Philippopolis.

Decius had been on his way to relieve Philippopolis with a reinforced army, but arrived too late.

After a long siege, Cniva was victorious after the city was betrayed by a citizen. The king subsequently allied himself with the governor of Thrace, Titus Julius Priscus, to take on the Roman Emperor Decius again at Abritus.
