= Battle of Abritus =

Battle between Romans and Gothic and Scythian tribesmen (251)

Coordinates: 43.588120°N 26.369997°E

- Part of the Crisis of the Third Century; Gothic War (248-253) and Roman–Germanic Wars
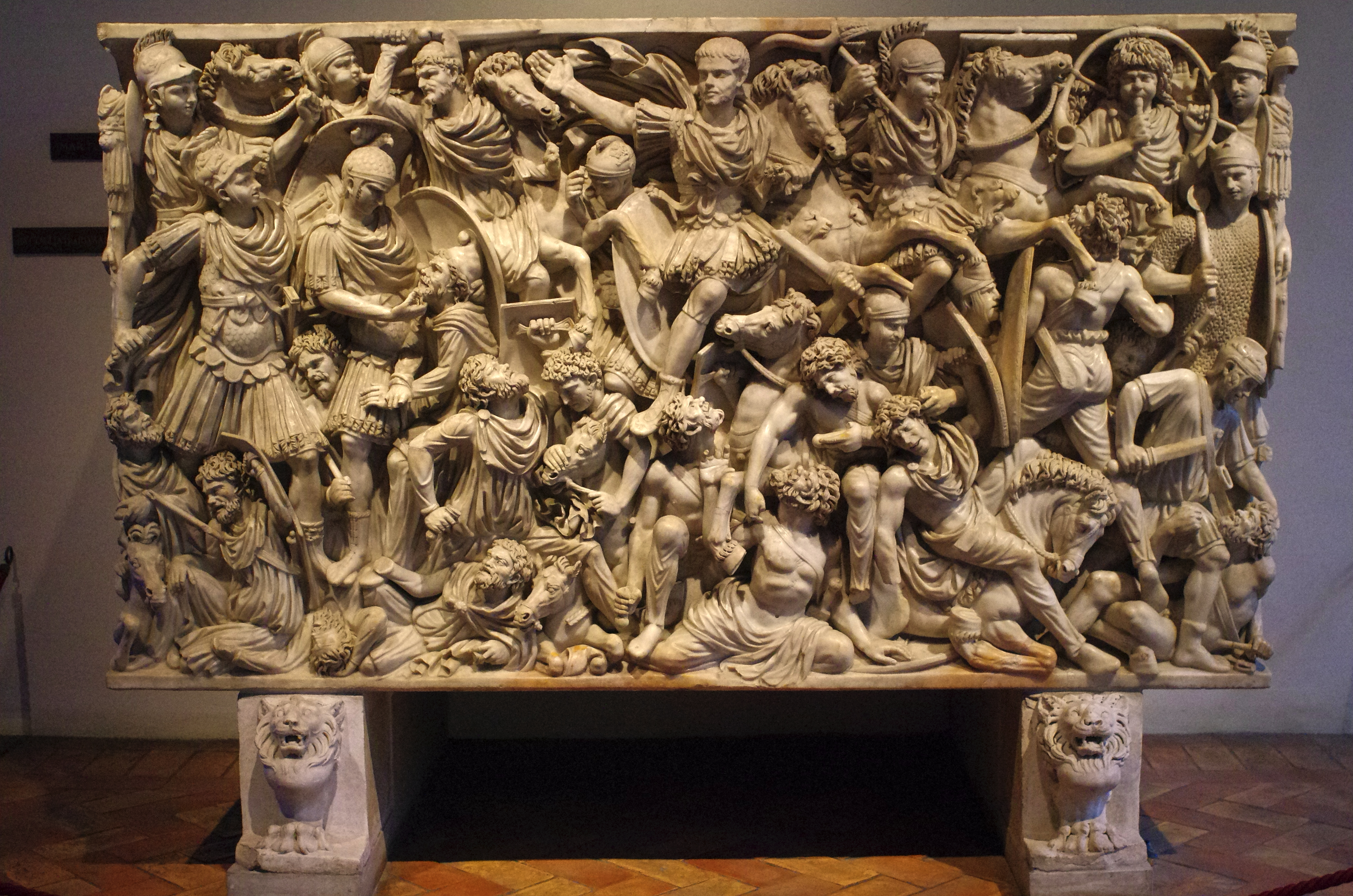
- Relief depicting a battle between Romans and Goths. Decoration on the Ludovisi Battle sarcophagus, dated to 250–260.
| Date | Summer 251 |
| Location | Abritus, Moesia Inferior, Roman Empire (today Razgrad, Bulgaria) |
| Result | Gothic victory |

Belligerents
| Goths | Roman Empire |

Commanders and leaders
| Cniva | Decius †; Herennius Etruscus † |

Strength
| Unknown | Unknown |

Casualties and losses
| Unknown | Heavy |

The Battle of Abritus also known as the Battle of Forum Terebronii occurred near Abritus (modern Razgrad) in the Roman province of Moesia Inferior in the summer of 251. It was fought between the Romans and a federation of Gothic and Scythian tribesmen under the Gothic king Cniva. The Roman army was soundly defeated, and Roman emperors Decius and Herennius Etruscus, his son, were both killed in battle. It was one of the worst defeats suffered by the Roman Empire against the Germanic tribes, rated by the Roman historian Ammianus Marcellinus as on par with the Battle of the Teutoburg Forest in 9, the Marcomannic invasion of Roman Italy in 170, and the Battle of Adrianople in 378.

The emperors' deaths led to more political instability at Rome; and the loss of the army allowed repeated barbarian incursions in the region for the next two decades.

The new Roman emperor Trebonianus Gallus was forced to allow the Goths to return home with their loot and prisoners. The barbarians would not be expelled from Roman territory until 271.

== Location ==
The long-debated location of Abritus was thought to be 1 km (0.62 mi) east of the city of Razgrad after excavations by T. Ivanov in 1969 and 1971. However recent work has shown it took place about 15 km (9.3 mi) northwest of Abritus, in the valley of the river Beli Lom, to the south of the village of Dryanovets near the site known locally as "Poleto" (the Field).

This is evidenced by the large number of Roman coins and arms including swords, shields, spears, armour, greaves, and even military tentpoles found by archaeologists and local residents on the site which must be the last Roman camp. For example, in 1952 a pottery vessel was found at ‘Poleto’ containing about 30 aurei in mint condition dating from Gordian III to Trajan Decius.

== Background ==
Map of the invasions and the location of the battle

Soon after Decius ascended to the throne in 249, barbarian tribes invaded the Roman provinces of Dacia, Moesia Superior, and Moesia Inferior. Two factors had contributed to growing unrest in the area north of the Danube. First, Decius' predecessor Philip the Arab had refused to continue payments, initiated by Emperor Maximinus Thrax in 238, of annual subsidies to the aggressive tribes of the region. Second and more important, there were continuous movements of new peoples since the time of Emperor Severus Alexander. Decius may also have taken with him troops from the Danube frontier, in order to depose Philip in 249. He probably had with him three legions: legio XIV Gemina from Carnuntum, legio IV Flavia Felix from Singidunum, and legio VII Claudia from Viminacium and/or their vexillationes.

The resultant military vacuum would inevitably attract invaders.

In 250 a tribal coalition under Cniva crossed the Roman Danube frontier, probably advancing in two columns. It is unlikely that these consisted only of Goths, so the name "Scythians", by which the Greek sources referred to them (a geographical definition) seems more appropriate. It is quite possible that other people of Germanic and Sarmatian origin (like Bastarnae, Taifals, and Hasdingian Vandals), perhaps Roman deserters as well, had joined the invaders. However, the name of the king is indeed Gothic and probably genuine. Meanwhile, the Carpi invaded Dacia, eastern Moesia Superior, and western Moesia Inferior.

The first column of Cniva's army, a detachment of about 20,000 or so likely led by the chieftains Argaith and Gunteric, besieged Marcianopolis, without success it seems. Then they probably headed south to besiege Philippopolis (now Plovdiv in Bulgaria). Cniva's main column of 70,000 under the King himself crossed the Danube at Oescus then headed eastwards to Novae, where he was repelled by the provincial governor (and future emperor) Trebonianus Gallus. Then the invaders headed south to plunder Nicopolis ad Istrum where Decius defeated them but not decisively.

After these initial setbacks, the barbarians moved southwards through Haemus mountain and Decius pursued them (likely through the Shipka Pass) to save Philippopolis. This time Decius' army was taken by surprise while resting at Beroe/Augusta Traiana. The Romans were heavily defeated in the ensuing Battle of Beroe. Decius was forced to withdraw his army to the north at Oescus, leaving Cniva ample time to ravage Moesia and finally capture Philippopolis in the summer of 251, in part with the help of its commander, a certain Titus Julius Priscus who had proclaimed himself Emperor. It seems that Priscus, after receiving the news of the defeat at Beroe, thought that the Goths would spare him and the city. He was wrong and was probably killed when the city fell. Then some of Cniva's forces began returning to their homeland, laden with booty and captives, among them many of senatorial rank.

In the meantime, Decius had returned with his re-organized army, consisting of 80,000 men according to Dexippus, accompanied by his son Herennius Etruscus and the general Trebonianus Gallus, intending to defeat the invaders and recover the booty. Decius had lost a force of auxiliary soldiers due to their "wrongdoing", according to Dexippus. Archaeology has revealed the presence of three legions at the battle.

== Battle ==
In either June, July, or August of 251, the Roman army engaged the forces under Cniva near Abritus. The strengths of the belligerent forces are unknown, but we know that Cniva divided his forces into three units, with one of these parts concealed behind a swamp. It seems that Cniva was a skilled tactician and that he was very familiar with the surrounding terrain. Jordanes and Aurelius Victor claim that Herennius Etruscus was killed by an arrow during a skirmish before the battle but his father addressed his soldiers as if the loss of his son did not matter. He allegedly said, "Let no one mourn. The death of one soldier is not a great loss to the Republic". However, other sources state that Herennius died with his father.

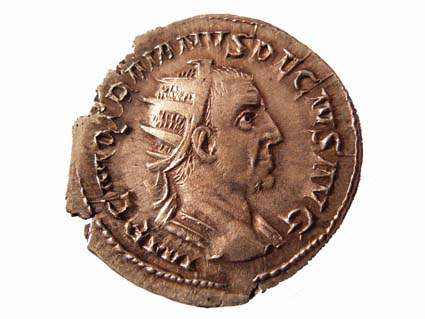
Coin of Trajan Decius, Roman Emperor defeated and killed in the battle

Decius' forces initially defeated their opponents in the front line, but made the fatal mistake of pursuing their fleeing enemy into the swamp, where they were ambushed and completely routed under a barrage of Gothic missiles. The immense slaughter that ensued marked one of the most catastrophic defeats in the history of the Roman Empire. Decius died in the midst of the chaos and slaughter, buried under the mud. The bodies of Decius and Herennius were never found.

The Goths captured Decius' treasury of tons of gold coins and many weapons which have since been discovered in many locations across Gothic territories.

Zonaras vividly narrates how:

He and his son and a large number of Romans fell into the marshland; all of them perished there, none of their bodies to be found, as they were covered by the mud.

A 6th-century Eastern Roman scholar, Zosimus, also described the total massacre of Decius' troops and the fall of the pagan emperor: "Proceeding therefore incautiously in an unknown place, he and his army became entangled in the mire, and under that disadvantage were so assailed by the missiles of the Barbarians, that not one of them escaped with life. Thus ended the life of the excellent emperor Decius."

Lactantius, a 4th-century early Christian and advisor to Roman Emperor Constantine the Great, described the emperor's demise as following:

He was suddenly surrounded by the barbarians, and slain, together with great part of his army; nor could he be honoured with the rites of sepulture, but, stripped and naked, he lay to be devoured by wild beasts and birds, a fit end for the enemy of God.

D. S. Potter rejects the story of Zosimus about Treboniannus Gallus who supposedly conspired with the enemies of Romans for delivering Decius' army into the Gothic trap since it seems impossible that, afterwards, the shattered Roman legions proclaimed emperor a traitor who was responsible for the loss of so many soldiers from their ranks. Another strong point against Gallus' treason is the fact that he adopted Hostilian, the younger son of Decius, after returning to Rome.

== Aftermath ==
Gallus, who became emperor upon Decius' death, negotiated a treaty with the Goths under duress, which allowed them to keep their booty and return to their homes on the other side of the Danube. It is also possible that he agreed to pay an annual tribute in return for the Goths' promise to respect Roman territory. This humiliating treaty, the contemporary spread of the Plague of Cyprian with its devastating effects, and the chaotic situation in the East with the Sassanian invasions left Gallus with a very bad reputation amongst the later Roman historians. However, D. S. Potter suggests that, before the defeat at Abritus, the situation was not so serious that the available Roman forces would not be able to manage the invasions. Therefore, it is Decius' bad conduct which was responsible for the disastrous turn of the events. In any case, Gallus had no choice but to get rid of the Goths as soon as possible.

In 271, the Emperor Aurelian conclusively defeated the Goths and killed their king Cannabaudes in battle. Based on the similarity of the names, that king might coincide with the King Cniva who defeated Decius in Abritus.

== See also ==
- Roman army
- Gothic and Vandal warfare

== Sources ==
=== Primary sources ===
- Aurelius Victor, De Caesaribus, par. 29.4–5 in Liber de Caesaribus of Sextus Aurelius Victor, critical edition by H. W. Bird, Liverpool University Press, 1994, ISBN 0-85323-218-0
- Dexippus, Scythica, (fragments of a lost work which is the main known source of all later Roman and Byzantine historians and chronographers), in Die Fragmente der griechischen Historiker, entry 100, ed. Felix Jacoby, Brill Academic Publishing, 2001
- George Syncellus, Chronographia (Medieval Greek: Ἐκλογή χρονογραφίας), in Corpus Scriptorum Historiae Byzantinae, ed. Dindorf, Weber, Bohn, 1829
- Jordanes, Getica, par. 101–103 from The Gothic History of Jordanes (English Version), ed. Charles C. Mierow, Arx Publishing, 2006, ISBN 1-889758-77-9
- Lactantius, De mortibus persecutorum, from Christian Classics Ethereal Library
- Zonaras, Epitome historiarum (Medieval Greek: Ἐπιτομή ἰστοριῶν), book 12, in Patrologia Graeca, ed. J. P. Migne, Paris, 1864, vol 134
- Zosimus, Historia Nova (Medieval Greek: Νέα Ἰστορία), book 1, in Corpus Scriptorum Historiae Byzantinae, ed. Bekker, Weber, Bonn, 1837

=== Secondary sources ===
- Bowman A. K., Garnsey P., Cameron A. (ed.). The Cambridge Ancient History - vol XII The Crisis of Empire, Cambridge University Press, 2005. ISBN 0-521-30199-8
- de Blois, Lukas (2017). "Invasions, Deportations, and Repopulation: Mobility and Migration in Thrace, Moesia Inferior, and Dacia in the Third Quarter of the Third Century AD". In Hekster, Olivier (ed.). The Impact of Mobility and Migration in the Roman Empire. Leiden: Brill. ISBN 978-90-04-33477-9.
- Ivanov Teofil and Stojanof Stojan. ABRITVS: Its History and Archaeology, Cultural and Historical Heritage Directorate, Razgrad, 1985
- Potter, David S. The Roman Empire at Bay AD 180–395, Routledge, 2004. ISBN 0-415-10058-5
- Southern, Pat. The Roman Empire from Severus to Constantine, Routledge, 2001. ISBN 0-415-23943-5
- Stillwell, Richard (ed.). Princeton Encyclopedia of Classical Sites, 1976: Archived 2007-03-07 at the Wayback Machine "Abrittus (Razgrad), Bulgaria"
- Talbert Richard J. A. (ed.). Barrington Atlas of the Greek and Roman World, Princeton University Press, 2000. ISBN 0-691-03169-X
- Wolfram, Herwig. History of the Goths (transl. by Thomas J. Dunlap), University of California Press, 1988, ISBN 0-520-06983-8
