= Cannabaudes =

Gothic leader of the Tervings (died 271)

Cannabaudes or Cannabas (died 271) was a third-century leader of the Gothic tribe of the Tervings, who died in a battle against the Roman emperor Aurelian.

== Life ==
In the third century many Germanic peoples invaded the Roman Empire and plundered the border regions. Among these, the Goths were the largest group crossing the Roman borders and devastating the Balkan peninsula. They also raided the coasts of the Black Sea and the Aegean Sea. Emperor Aurelian, the former magister equitum of emperor Claudius Gothicus, who had died of the plague, was occupied fighting the dead emperor's brother Quintillus for the Roman throne and later fighting against the Vandals and Juthungi in Italy. The Tervings under their leader Cannabaudes took advantage of this situation and devastated the provinces of the lower Danube and sacked some cities.

On his march to the East to reintegrate the Palmyrene Empire to the Roman Empire, Aurelian drove the Tervings out of the Roman empire and, unlike others before him, followed them over the Danube. In the ensuing battle, Cannabaudes died along with 5,000 of his men.

For this victory Aurelian received the surname Gothicus Maximus. At his triumph after his victory over the Palmyrene Empire, he paraded Gothic women, dressed as Amazons, and a chariot, pulled by four stags, that was said to have belonged to Cannabaudes.

Despite his victory over Cannabaudes, Aurelian abandoned the province of Dacia, which was populated by barbaric tribes such as the Goths.

Through his military achievements, Aurelian averted a further Gothic intrusions into Roman lands for a century.

While some historians call Cannabaudes a king of the Goths, others consider that he was only one of the more powerful leaders of the Goths.

The only ancient source mentioning his name is the Historia Augusta, which is not a generally reliable source. Nevertheless, Cannabaudes is seen as a historic person by most historians. Some historians want to identify Cannabaudes with Cniva, the Gothic leader who defeated and killed emperor Decius at the Battle of Abrittus twenty years earlier, others historians consider that he was Cniva's son.

== Ancient sources ==
- Historia Augusta, vita Aureliani.

== Modern literature ==
- Wolf von Barloewen: Geschichte der Germanen bis 376 n.Chr., in: Wolf von Barloewen [ed.]: Abriss der Geschichte antiker Randkulturen, Oldenbourg, Munich 1961.
- Timothy Barnes: The Sources of the Historia Augusta, Ed. Latomus, Brüssel 1978.
- Thomas Burns: A History of the Ostrogoths, Indiana Univ. Press, Bloomington 1984.
- Thomas Gerhardt, Udo Hartmann: Fasti, Die germanischen Herrscher, in: Klaus-Peter Johne [ed.]: Die Zeit der Soldatenkaiser, Berlin 2008, p. 1192-1198.
- Andreas Goltz: Die Völker an der mittleren und nordöstlichen Reichsgrenze, in: Klaus-Peter Johne [ed.]: Die Zeit der Soldatenkaiser, Berlin 2008, p. 449-464.
- Edmund Groag: Domitius [36] Aurelian, Realencyclopädie der Classischen Altertumswissenschaft V 1, Stuttgart 1903, p. 1347-1419.
- Udo Hartmann: Claudius Gothicus und Aurelian, in: Klaus-Peter Johne [ed.]: Die Zeit der Soldatenkaiser, Berlin 2008, p. 297-324.
- Peter Heather: The Goths, Blackwell, Oxford, Cambridge/Massachusetts 1996.
- Michael Kulikowski: Rome's Gothic Wars, Cambridge Univ. Press, Cambridge u.a. 2007.
- Bruno Rappaport: Die Einfälle der Goten in das Römische Reich bis auf Constantin, Hirschfeld, Leipzig 1899.
- Alaric Watson: Aurelian and the third Century, London, New York 1998.
- Herwig Wolfram: Die Goten, Beck, Munich ³1990.
- Herwig Wolfram: Kniva, Reallexikon der Germanischen Altertumskunde 17, Walter de Gruyter, Berlin, New York 2001, p. 34-37.
- Herwig Wolfram: Die Goten und ihre Geschichte, Beck, Munich ²2005.
- Herwig Wolfram: Gotische Studien, Beck, Munich 2005.

== See also ==
- Thervingi
- Crisis of the Third Century
- Aurelian
- Cniva
