= Gothic War (248–253) =

War between the Goths and the Roman Empire (249–253)

- Part of the Gothic Wars and Crisis of the Third Century
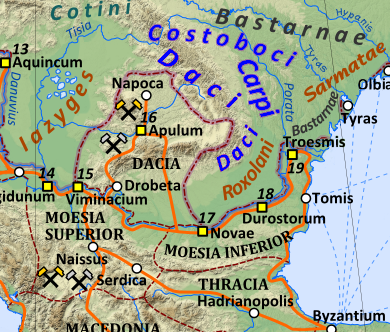
- Roman province of Dacia in the 2nd century
Date	248–253
Location	Balkans
Result	Roman victory

Belligerents
Roman Empire	Goths; Germanics; Sarmatians; Roman deserters

Commanders and leaders
Philip the Arab; Trajan Decius; Trebonianus Gallus; Aemilianus	Ostrogotha; Argedo; Gunderico; Cniva
- Casus belli: Cessation of the payment of tribute by the Roman emperor to the Gothic tribes.

The Gothic War of 248–253 took place between the years 248 and 249, as well as in the year 253. Within this war, a series of battles occurred and plundering was carried out by the Goths and their allies in the eastern territory of the Roman Empire, specifically in the Balkans. With the cessation of the payment of tribute previously made by the Roman emperor Philip the Arab (r. 244–249) to the tribes beyond the Danube, the Goths and their allies, led by King Ostrogotha and his subcommanders Argedo and Gundericus, moved towards the Roman border and began a series of attacks, including against the fortified city of Marcianopolis (today Devnya) in Thracia. After these actions, the Goths withdrew with their spoils of war.

In 250, the invasions continued, the Carpiani attacked Dacia, while the Gothic King Cniva commanding various groups of Goths and other allied peoples, defeated the Romans in two major battles, in one of these he killed the Roman emperor Decius (r. 249–251) and his co-emperor Herennius Etruscus (r. 251). The imperial successor Trebonianus Gallus (r. 251–253) pledged to pay an annual tribute if the invaders left, however, he did not keep his promise, which provoked new attacks in 253, although the governor and future emperor Aemilianus (r. 253) managed to stop these raids.

== Background ==
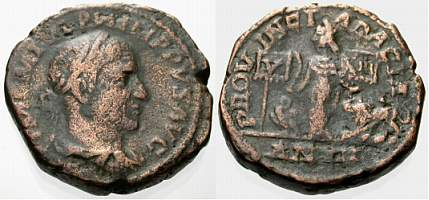
Sestertius of Philip the Arab (r. 244–249). AE 28 mm, 16.6 g. Obv.: Laureate and draped bust right, legend IMP M IVL PHILIPPVS AVG. Rev.: Dacia standing left, lion and eagle at feet. PROVINCIA DACIA, AN[NO] III.

Two factors can be distinguished that contributed to the growing discontent of the population living north of the Danube during the 3rd century, which culminated in the outbreak of the Gothic War: The first and most important was that since the time of Severus Alexander (r. 222–235), there were continuous relocations of new villages close to the Danubian border. At that time it is reported that the cities of Olbia and Tiras, former Greek colonies in present-day Ukraine, were destroyed by warriors of a new and powerful people who were ravaging that region. Subsequently, in the spring of 238, groups of warriors of this same people, generically referred to as Scythians, crossed the lands of the Carpiani, Dacians, and invaded Lower Moesia, where they captured and plundered the city of Istros.

The second factor was the actions of Emperor Philip the Arab (r. 244–249), who, emboldened by his political successes, specifically in relation to the Sassanid Empire of Shapur I (r. 240, 242–272), decided to review the situation of the Germanic tribes and resolved to stop paying the annual tributes established in 238 by Maximinus Thrax (r. 235–238), granted for the purpose of appeasing the aggressive tribes of the region. He also canceled all other agreements previously made.

== Ostrogotha's invasions ==
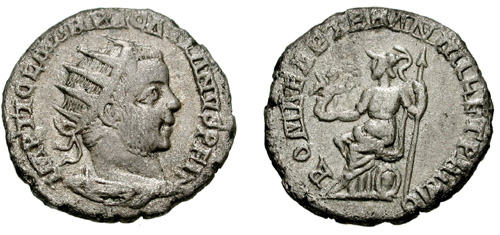
Antoninianus of usurper Pacatianus (r. 248-249), Obv.: Radiate bust, IMP TI CL MAR PACATIANVS P F IN[VICTVS]. Rev.: Rome seated holding Victory and wreath, ROMAE AETER[NA] AN[NOS] MIL[LE] ET PRIMO. AR 4.38 gr.

According to De origine actibusque Getarum by the Roman historian Jordanes, as a consequence of suspending the payment of tribute at the end of 248, Ostrogotha, king of the Ostrogoths and Visigoths, crossed the Danube with an army made up of Goths and allied Germanic-Sarmat tribes (Taifals, Bastarnae, Hasdingi and Carpiani), estimated by the author to number 300,000 men, (Note: Jordanes claims that the barbarians totaled 300,000 men, but writers like him of the Byzantine era often inflated the numbers of barbarians, typically by a factor of 10. For example, one can see with Zosimus claims that 600,000 Alemanni perished at the Battle of Strasburg in 357, versus the 6000 recorded by the contemporary and more reliable Ammianus Marcellinus. Thus, 30,000 is a more logical estimate, but it would still be formidable for an Ostrogothic invasion (cf. Ammianus Marcellinus, History of Rome).) and led an invasion of Moesia and Thracia. At the same time, Pacatian (r. 248) was made emperor by his own troops stationed near the Danube. Jordanes states that the Gothic invasion of Ostrogotha was successful, due to the negligence of the soldiers guarding the Danubian frontier.

To deal with this chaotic situation, Philip appointed the senator Decius as commander of the legions quartered in Pannonia and Moesia. Upon arrival in this region, as recounted by Jordanes, Decius found it impossible to restrain the invaders and preferred to release his soldiers from military service. The soldiers rebelled and presented themselves to Ostrogotha requesting his protection, which was granted, joining the invading forces. Ostrogotha's Gothic subcommanders, named Argedo and Gunderico, were sent to sack Moesia again, subsequently heading for the fortified city of Marcianopolis in Thracia. After a long siege, they forced the villagers to give them money to cease their attack. After this, Ostrogotha withdrew to his country with the spoils.

== Rise of Decius and King Cniva's invasion ==
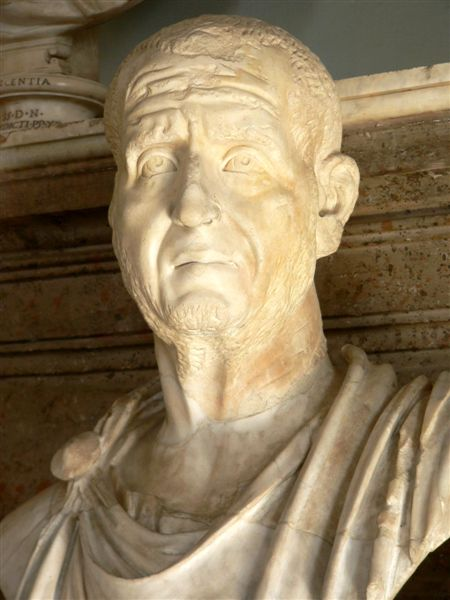
Bust of Gaius Messius Quintus Trajan Decius (r. 249-251)

Gothic invasions of 250-251

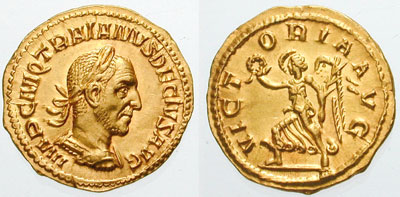
Aureus of Decius. Obv.: IMP C M Q TRAIANVS DECIVS AVG. Rev.: Victoria holding wreath and palm, VICTORIA AVGG. 4,32 gr.

In the spring of 249, Decius, still in command of the legions of Pannonia and Moesia, was proclaimed emperor by his troops and decided to march against Rome to depose Philip. The resulting military vacuum inevitably attracted more invaders. The following year, the Carpiani invaded Dacia, eastern Upper Moesia, and western Lower Moesia. At the same time, the Gothic king Cniva, the successor of Ostrogotha, organized his forces and took the opportunity to attack the Romans as well. Cniva's forces apparently included Goths, Vandals, and Taifals, as well as some renegade Roman veterans. Given the description of the Scythians, provided by Zosimus, it is almost certain that there were no Sarmatian elements, such as the Roxolani.

Cniva divided his army into two parts and sent about 20,000 of his soldiers to attack Moesia, which at that time was unprotected, and then to Philippopolis (present-day Plovdiv, in Bulgaria), while he himself led 70,000 men to Euscia (Novae). The general Trebonianus Gallus expelled Cniva from that region, driving him to flee to Nikopolis. As Emperor Decius approached, the Gothic king decided to head for the vicinity of Mount Haemus, and then set out for Philippopolis.

With the departure of Cniva, Decius crossed Mount Haemus, perhaps through the Shipka Pass, and camped at Beroe (present-day Stara Zagora), where he was later defeated in a surprise attack by the Gothic king. His army was annihilated, and he was forced to return to Euscia, where he met with Trebonianus Gallus, who was stationed with a large force to protect the frontier. There Decius massed the army of this region and prepared for further conflicts. At the same time, Cniva laid siege to Philippopolis, which fell in the summer after enduring a long siege. The Gothic king then allied himself with the local governor, Titus Julius Priscus, against the Romans.

The sack of Philippopolis motivated the emperor to act. After intercepting the Germanic partisans and repairing the Danubian fortifications, he set out to fight the Goths, who were surrounded by the numerically superior Roman forces as they attempted to retreat. Decius engaged them in the Battle of Abritus, at a site near the small town of Forum Terebronii or Abritus (present-day Razgrad). The Roman army was trapped in a swamp as it attempted to advance, and both the emperor and his son Herennius Etruscus were killed in action.

== Last invasion and consequences ==
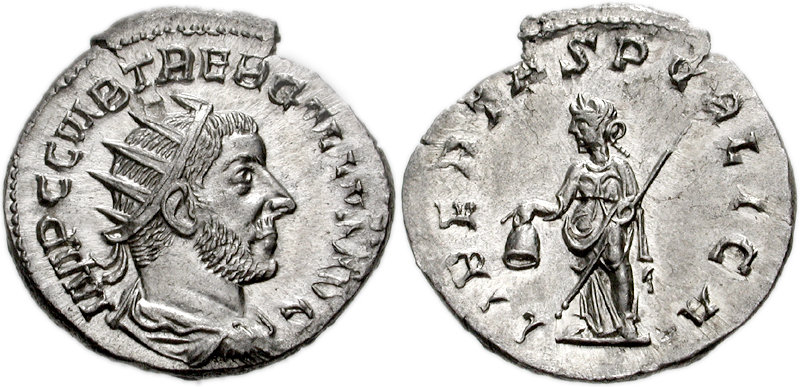
Antoninianus of Trebonianus Gallus (r. 251-253). Obv.: Radiate bust, IMP C C VIB TREB GALLVS AUG. Rev.: Libertas holding pileus (cap) and sceptre, LIBERTAS PUBLICA. AR 21 mm, 3.6 gr.

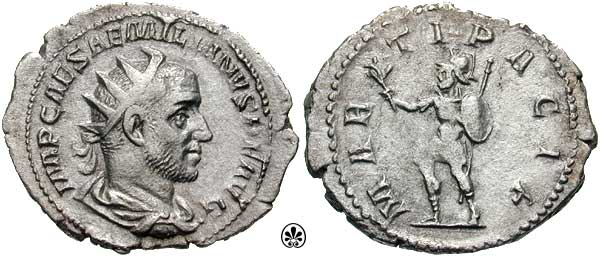
Antoninianus of usurper Aemilianus (r. 253), Obv.: Radiate bust, IMP CAES AEMILIANVS P F AVG. Rev.: Mars advancing, MARTI PACIF. 2,37 gr.

As a consequence of the Battle of Abritus, news of the disaster reached the remnant Danubian legions, who proclaimed their commander Trebonianus Gallus (r. 251–253) as emperor. He allowed Cniva to depart with his booty and promised to pay a tribute in exchange for not invading the Roman dominions again. Despite his promise, the then governor of Moesia and Pannonia, and future emperor Aemilianus (r. 253) refused to pay this tribute. This, coupled with the plague of Cyprian (251–270), a smallpox pandemic that devastated between 15% and 30% of the imperial population, prompted a new invasion by the Goths of Cniva into Moesia and Thracia in 253. Aemilianus managed to successfully fend off the invaders, who were expelled and pursued beyond the Danube by a lightning attack on their territories, thus putting an end to the barbarian threat.

Aemilianus recovered large amounts of booty and freed thousands of captured Roman citizens. Possibly among the freedmen was Cnaeus Valerius Serapion, who dedicated an undated altar, found in Apulon (now Alba Iulia) in Roman Dacia, thanking them for his ransom from the Carpiani (Liberatus a Carpis). As a consequence of these events, the Danubian frontier remained quiet for some years. In 256 and 257, taking advantage of the political instability of the empire, a coalition of barbarian tribes, led by the Carpiani, invaded Moesia, sacked Thracia and besieged Thessaloniki in Macedonia.

In the following years, the hostile tribes of the Danubian basin led new invasions, the most important being that of 267 or 268, commanded by the Goths. In this incursion, the barbarians penetrated as far as the Aegean Sea, invading various island and coastal regions. They landed in Macedonia and sacked Thracia, until they were stopped and defeated at the Battle of Naissus in 268–269, by Gallienus (r. 260–268) or Claudius II (r. 268–270).

== See also ==
- Gothic Wars

== Bibliography ==
- Bowman, Alan K. (2005). "The Crisis of Empire, A.D. 193-337". The Cambridge Ancient History. Vol. XII. Cambridge University Press.
- Chambers, Raymond Wilson (2010). Widsith: A Study in Old English Heroic Legend. Cambridge University Press. ISBN 978-1108015271.
- Christensen, Arne Søby (2002). Cassiodorus, Jordanes and the History of the Goths: Studies in a Migration Myth. Copenhague: Museum Tusculanum Press. ISBN 8772897104.
- Hussey, Joan Mervyn (1967). The Cambridge Medieval History. Vol. 4. Cambridge: Cambridge University Press.
- Jordanes (551). The origin and deeds of the goths. Translated by Mierow, Charles C. Constantinopla.
- Potter, David Stone (2014). The Roman Empire at Bay AD 180–395. Routledge. ISBN 978-1134694778.
- Southern, Pat (2001). "Beyond the Eastern Frontiers". The Roman Empire from Severus to Constantine. Routledge. ISBN 0-415-23943-5.
- Stathakopoulos, Dionysios Ch. (2007). Famine and Pestilence in the late Roman and early Byzantine Empire. London and New York: Routledge.
- Wolfram, Herwig (1990). History of the Goths. Berkeley, Los Angeles and London.: University of California Press. ISBN 9780520069831.
- Wolfram, Herwig (1997). The Roman Empire and Its Germanic Peoples. Berkeley, Los Angeles and London.: University of California Press. ISBN 0520085116.
- Zosimus (6th century). Nova Historia (PDF). English translation of the work of the historian Zósimo.
