= Battle of Beroe =

Battle between Romans and Gothic forces (250)

- Part of the Crisis of the Third Century; Gothic War (248-253) and Roman–Germanic Wars
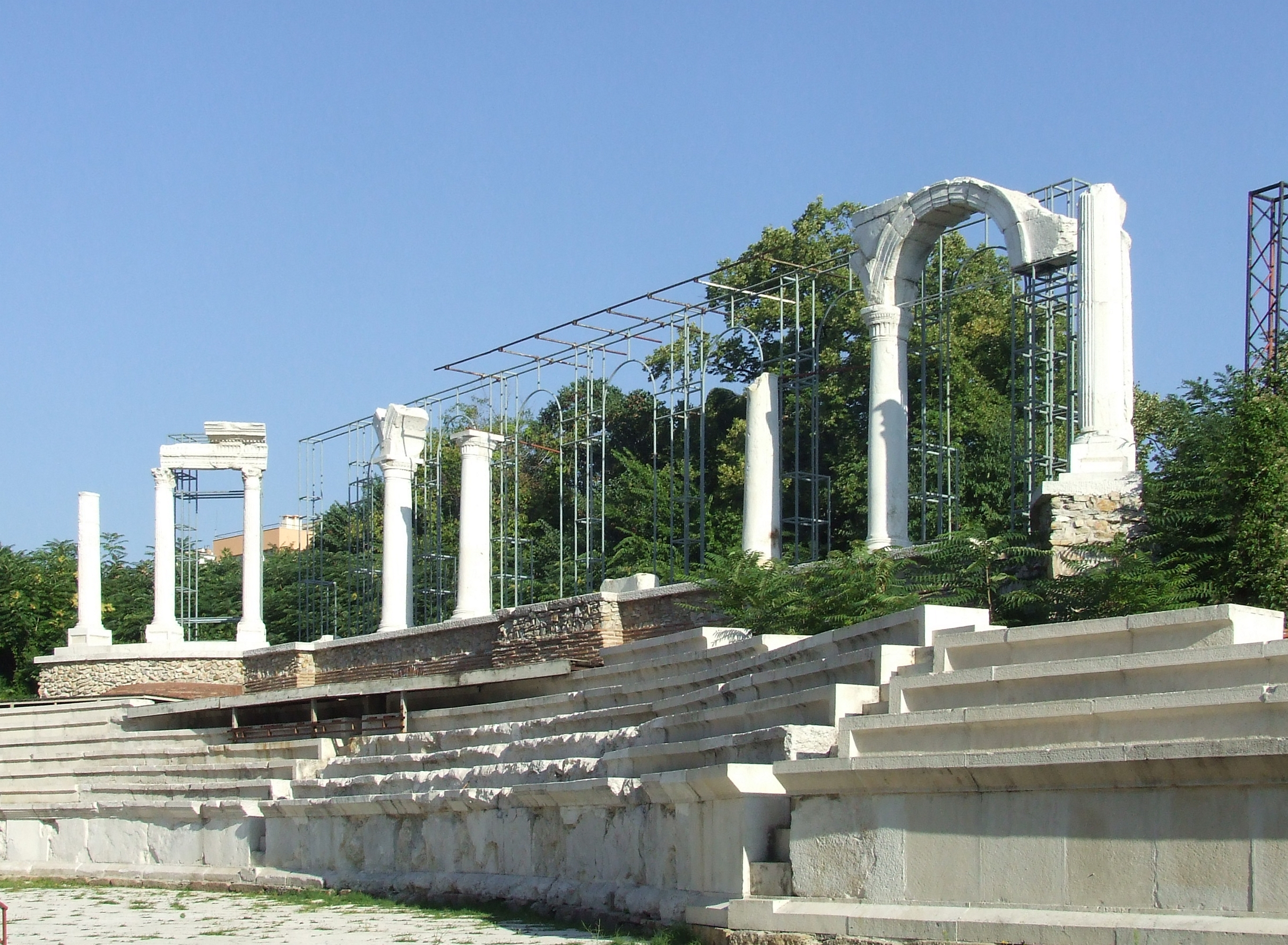
- Ruins of a Roman amphitheatre at Beroe (now Stara Zagora).
Date	250 AD
Location	Beroe
Result	Gothic victory

Belligerents
Goths	Roman Empire

Commanders and leaders
Cniva	Trajan Decius

The Battle of Beroe was a conflict near Stara Zagora, ancient Ulpia Augusta Traiana, between the Romans and Goths in 250. The Romans under Trajan Decius were pursuing the Goths, under Cniva, after their victory at the Battle of Nicopolis ad Istrum. A Goth ambush at Beroe led to heavy Roman losses and forced Decius to retreat across the Balkan Mountains to Moesia. This allowed Cniva to capture Philippopolis in Thrace.
