= Nicopolis ad Istrum =

Ancient city in northern Bulgaria

- Νικόπολις ἡ πρὸς Ἴστρον (Greek)
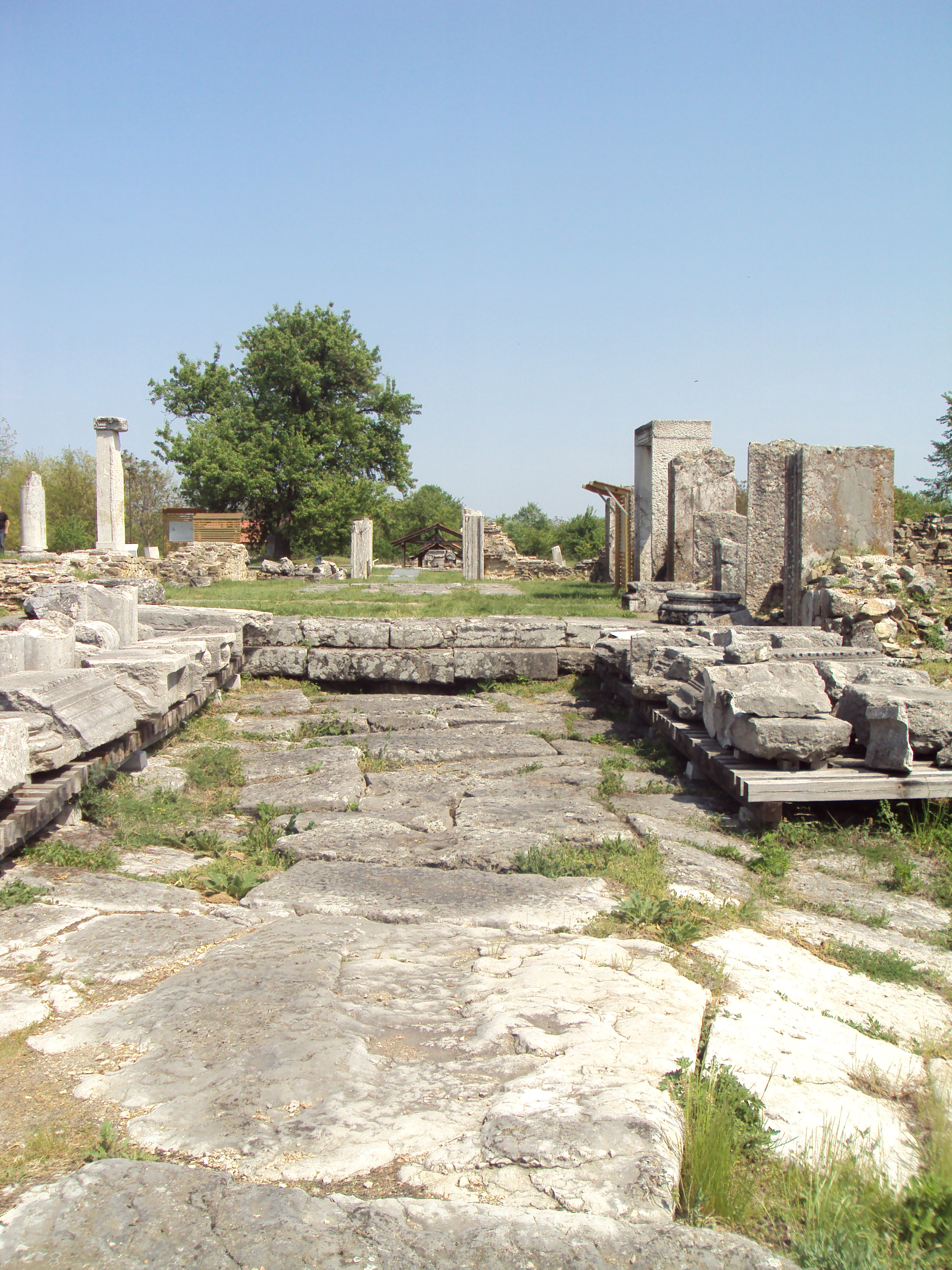

- Location within Bulgaria
- 43°13′02″N 25°36′40″E

History
- Built: 101–106 A.D.
- Built by: Trajan
- Abandoned: 447 A.D.

Nicopolis ad Istrum (Greek: Νικόπολις ἡ πρὸς Ἴστρον) or Nicopolis ad Iatrum was a Roman and Early Byzantine town.

Its ruins are located at the village of Nikyup, 20 km north of Veliko Tarnovo in northern Bulgaria. The town reached its zenith during the reigns of Hadrian, the Antonines and the Severan dynasty. Archaeological excavations are continuing to reveal more of the city.

The site was placed on the Tentative List for consideration as a World Heritage Site by UNESCO in 1984.

== History ==
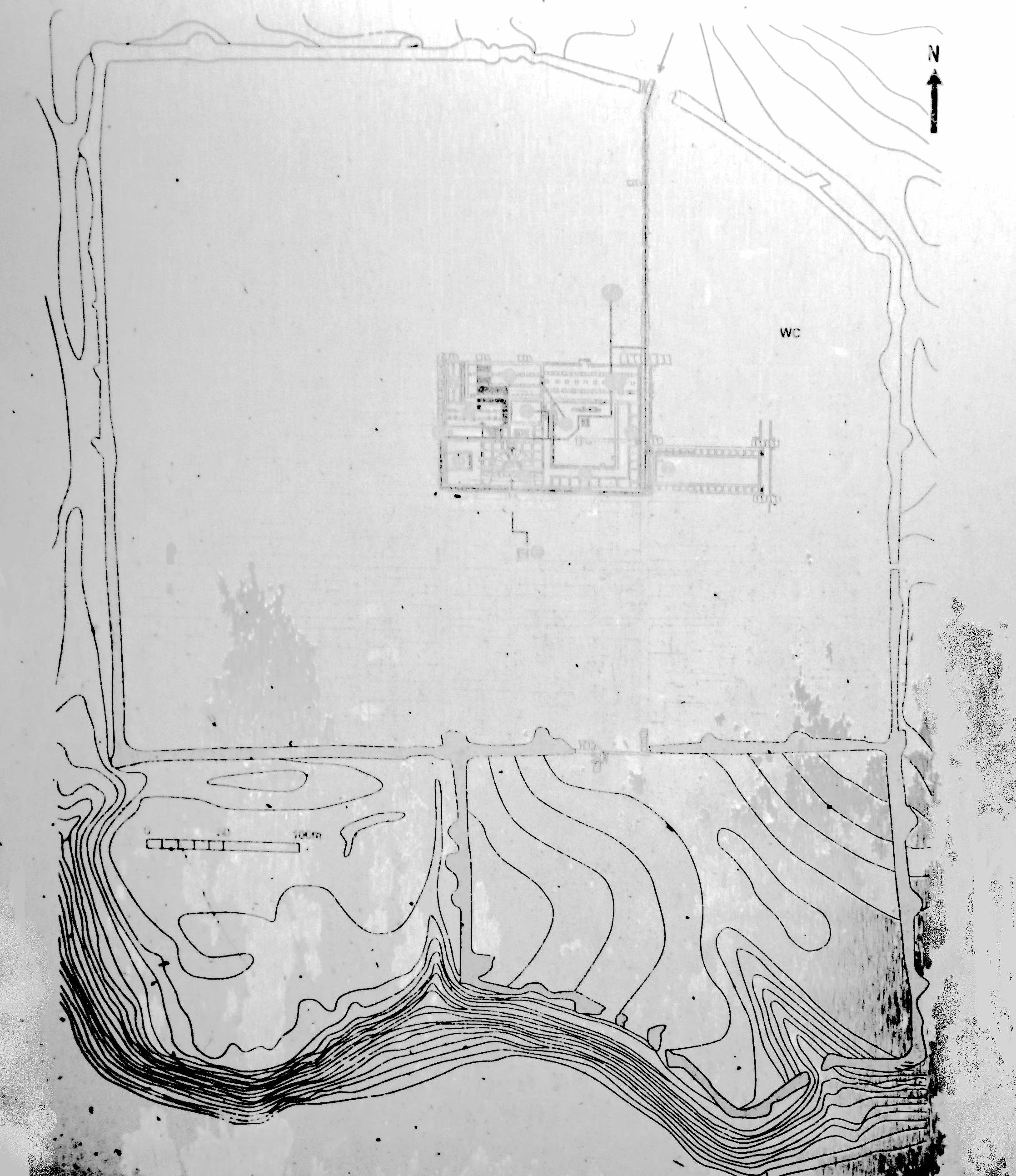
Plan of Nicopolis showing central excavated area and later city to the south

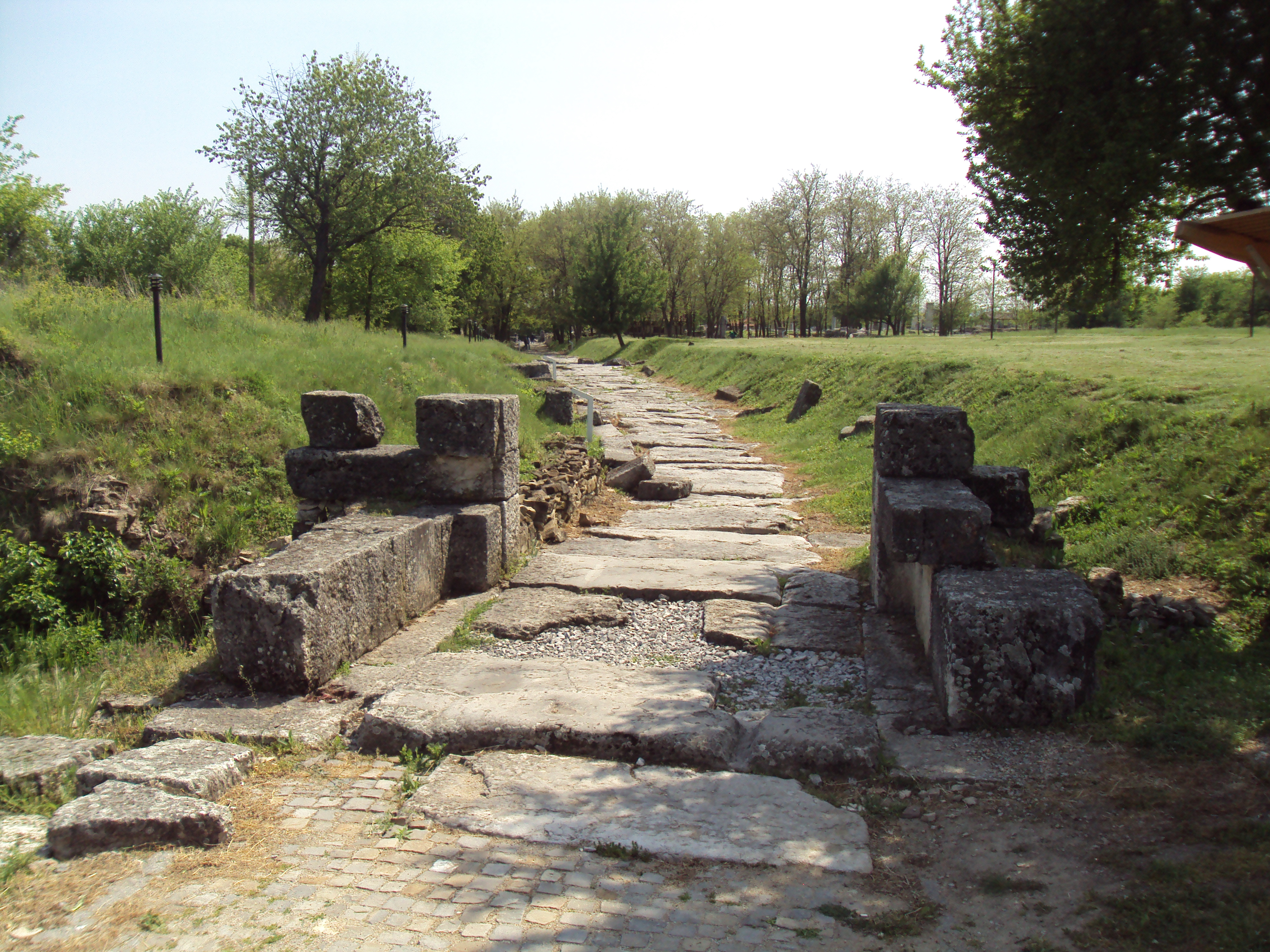
Northern Gate of the city

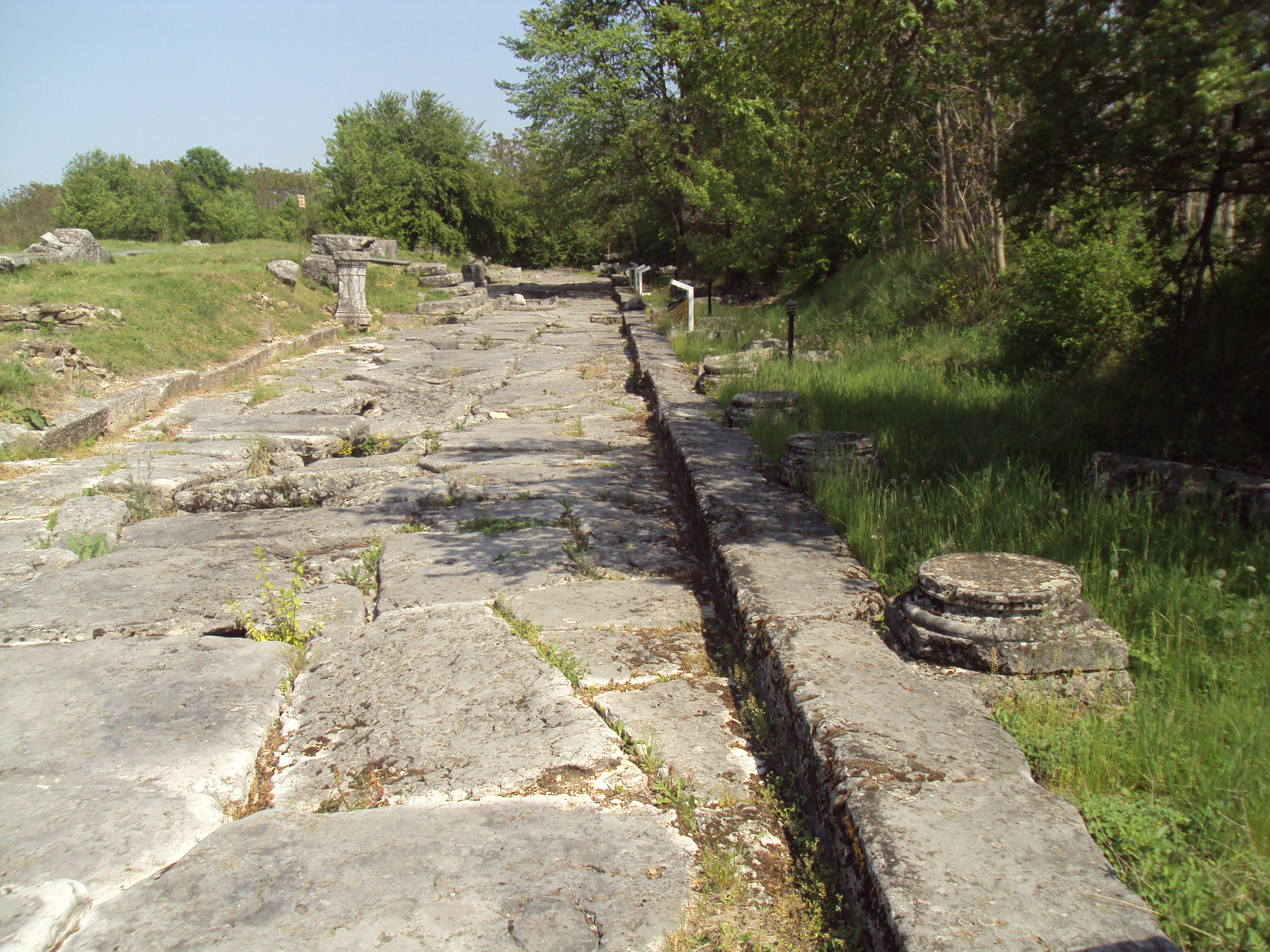
A city street

The site was at the junction of the Iatrus (Yantra) and the Rositsa rivers, where the Roman army under Emperor Trajan had been amassed in readiness for the attack in the winter of 101–2 to the Roxolani tribe from north of the Danube and who were allied to the Dacians.

The city was founded by Trajan around 102–106, as indicated on Trajan’s Column, in memory of his victory in the Dacian Wars over the Roxolani and also later victories in 105. It was named Ulpia Nicopolis in his honour using his family name, or nomen. However the name Nicopolis ad Haemum was used in Ptolemy's Geographia dating from before 130.

Trajan clearly intended it to become a magnificent city which is gradually being verified. The monumental character of the city however dates mainly to Hadrian and Antoninus Pius (138–161) and inscriptions found are no earlier than 136 when the name Ulpia Nicopolis ad Istrum was in use. The new agora included a monumental ionic stoa and a sumptuous hall of unknown function.

The city was ransacked by the Costoboci in 170-171, a tribe from today’s Western Ukraine, shortly after which the city walls were built. Many buildings were excluded from the walled area from this time.

The city prospered again in the 2nd and 3rd centuries under the Severan dynasty (193–235). In 198 CE, Septimius Severus and Caracalla sent a letter to the city, thanking its leaders and inhabitants for their festival celebrating the emperors' victory over the Parthians and for sending a substantial monetary gift. This gesture may have been aimed at gaining favor and securing additional privileges, such as the status of neokoros.

However from about 212 the honorary title Ulpia was no longer used in public inscriptions which is believed to be a result of Caracalla's displeasure with the city after his visit there in 211–212. Caracalla closed the mint and it lost its status of civitas stipendaria as well as its economic prosperity. After his death the city organised games for the new emperor and as a result it seems that the city regained its civic status, though not its full name, and re-opened the mint, issuing coins bearing images of its public buildings.

In 250 near the city, emperor Decius defeated the Goths under Cniva at the Battle of Nicopolis ad Istrum.

Nicopolis grew further as a major urban centre under Emperor Diocletian's (284–305) reforms. Nevertheless at least the north wing of the agora was damaged during the 3rd century.

Under Constantine from 306 the damaged northern agora buildings were replaced by two built with opus mixtum masonry, divided into three aisles by rows of large pillars, which may well have been horrea (warehouses), given that other nearby cities (e.g. Tropaeum and Zaldapa) also received horrea rather than basilicas in the same period. These horrea probably formed part of the large supply network for the Danube army helped by building a large number of horrea in the late 3rd and early 4th centuries.

In 447, the town was destroyed by Attila's Huns. Perhaps it was already abandoned before the early 5th century.

In about the middle of 5th century after the Huns' invasion, new high and strong walls were built adjoining the southern wall of the old city. It seems that by then the old walls were in poor condition and repairing them was not viable. Moreover, their considerable length of 1.8 km required more defenders than were available. The new city had an area of 1/4 of the original city enclosing little more than military buildings and churches, following a very common trend for the cities of that century in the Danube area. The larger area of the extensive ruins (21.55 hectares) of the classical Nicopolis was not reoccupied. The south wall of the old city was reconstructed as the north wall of the new one. Its towers were built upon destroyed and abandoned buildings, and ornamented stone blocks from their facades were used in the new structures. The towers were about 15m in front of the 10m high wall. The outside of the wall was rendered with mortar with incised grooves imitating massive stone blocks. The old south gate later also underwent a major reconstruction to compensate for higher surrounding terrain as the gate was situated in a hollow.

The town became an episcopal centre during the early Byzantine period. The names of two of the early bishops of the city are known: Marcellus (in 451) and Amantius (in 518).

The city was destroyed by the Avars and Slavs in the late 7th c. during the Avar–Byzantine wars. A small Bulgarian settlement later arose upon its ruins (9th–14th century). Nicopolis ad Istrum can be said to have been the birthplace of Germanic literary tradition. In the 4th century, the Gothic bishop, missionary and translator Ulfilas (Wulfila) obtained permission from Emperor Constantius II to immigrate with his flock of converts to Moesia and settle near Nicopolis ad Istrum in 347–348. There, he devised the Gothic alphabet and oversaw the translation of the Bible from Greek to Gothic, which was performed by a group of scholars.

== Archaeology ==
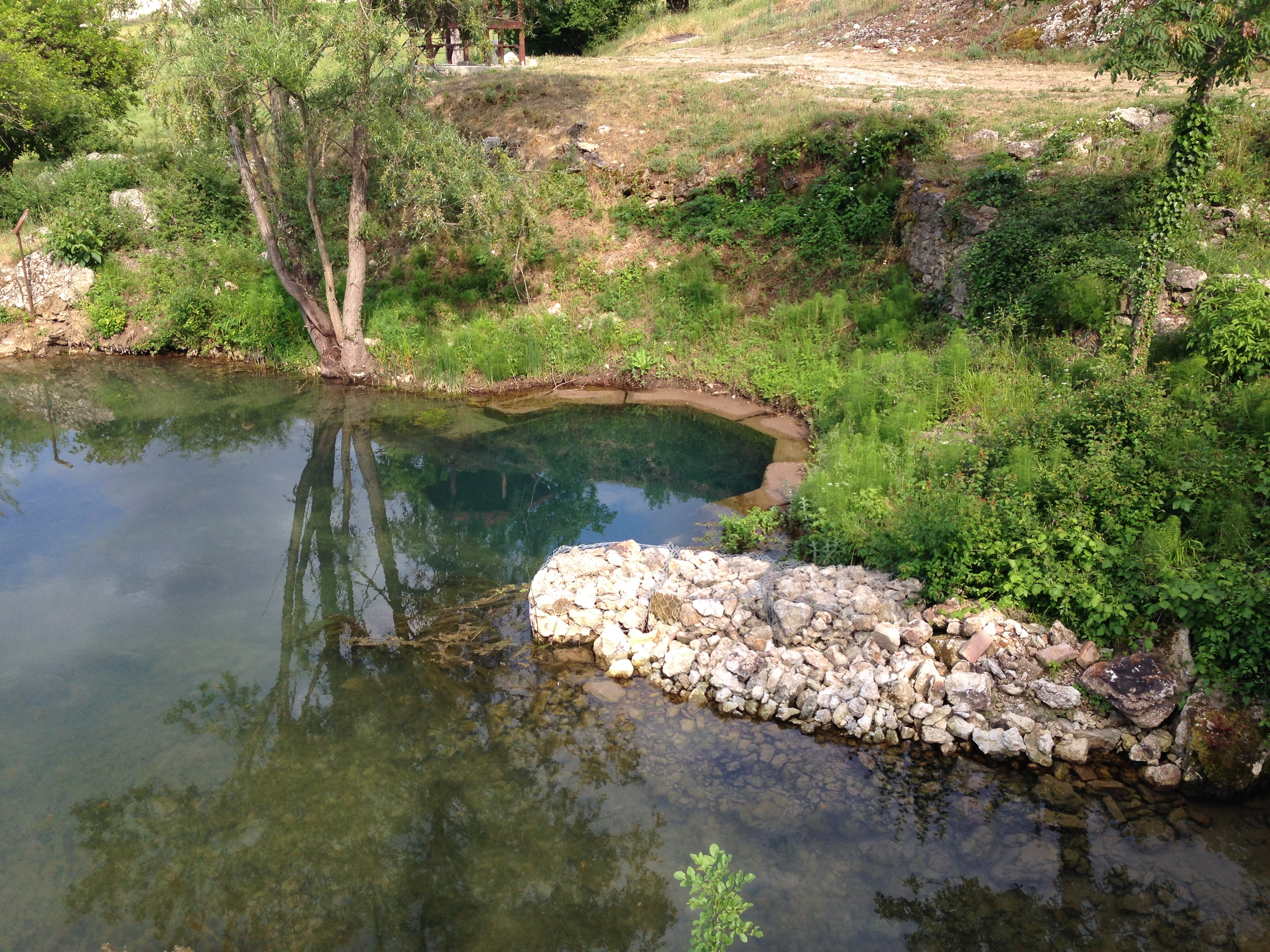
Aqueduct source octagonal collection basin

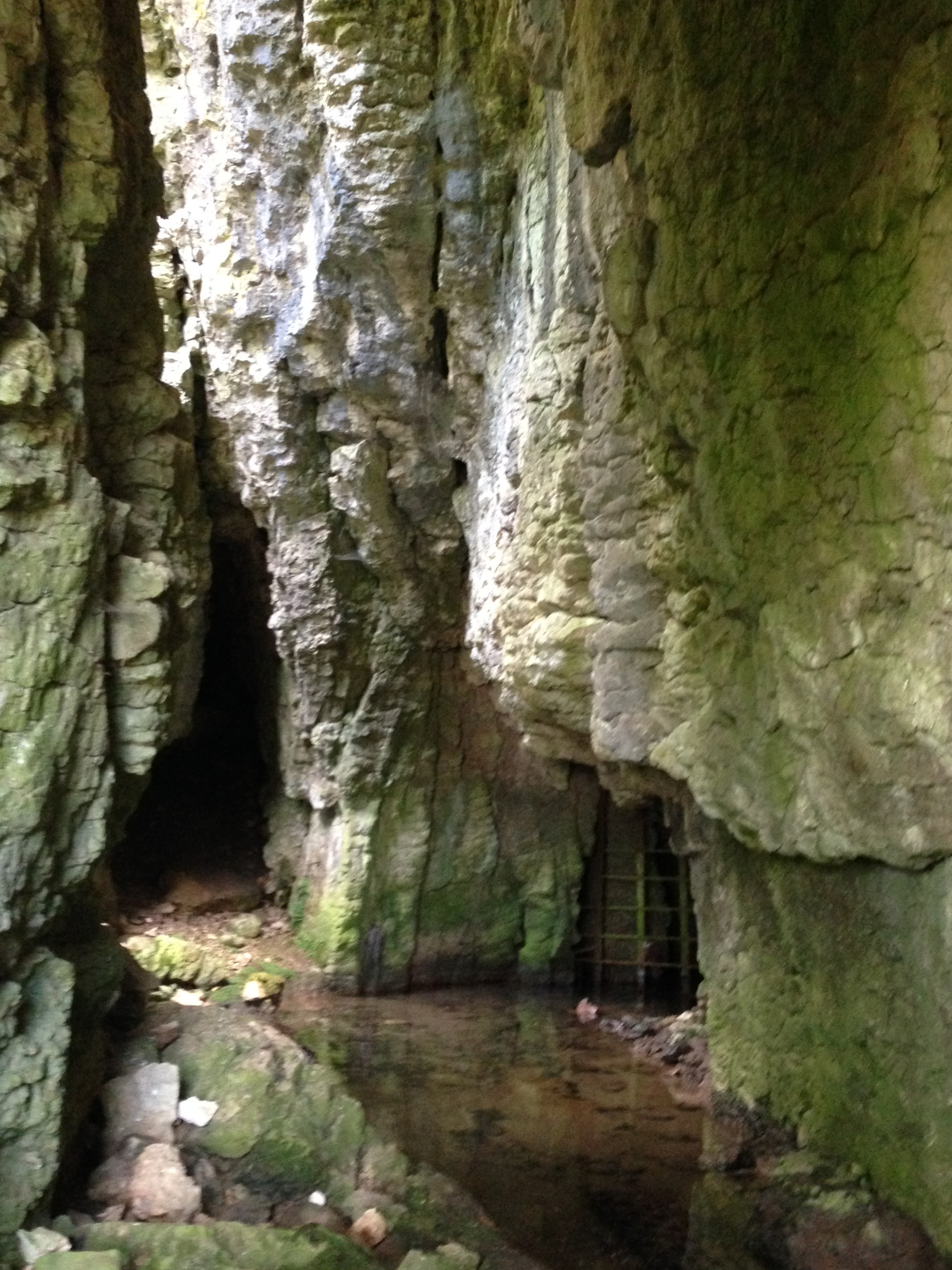
Aqueduct underground source

The classical town was planned according to the orthogonal system. The network of streets, the forum surrounded by an Ionic colonnade and many buildings, a two-nave room later turned into a basilica and other public buildings have been uncovered. The rich architectures and sculptures show a similarity with those of the ancient towns in Asia Minor.

The agora contained a statue of Trajan on horseback as well as other marble statues and an Ionic colonnade. The city also had a three-nave basilica, a bouleuterion, a temple of Cybele, a small odeon, thermae (public baths) as well as a unique Roman building inscribed with termoperiatos, a heated building with shops and enclosed space for walks and business meetings. Some town houses and buildings have also been excavated.

A unique public building, a thermoperipatos, has been identified only in Nicopolis ad Istrum so far, out of all cities in Roman Empire. It occupied a whole insula and was built under Commodus in 184-5 on the ruins of an earlier building. It was probably used for trading and included shops. It was ruined in the 4th c. and another building later built over it.

The city was supplied by three aqueducts and had several water wells, many of which have been unearthed in archaeological excavations. The western aqueduct of 25 km length had a bridge of almost 3 km long and almost 20m tall carrying water over the entire valley of the Rositsa River. Its 2nd century water catchment reservoir is located near the town of Musina in Pavlikeni municipality, to the west of the Roman city, where it still collects water from the karst springs inside the Musina Cave. A large castellum aquae of this aqueduct stands to the west of the city.

In 2015 remains of a huge building were revealed which was probably the residence of the agoranomus or curule aedile, a public officer in charge of trade and market operations in Ancient Greek and Roman cities.

The obelisk of Quintus Julius, an aristocrat from Nicopolis, still stands to a height of 14m in the countryside near Lesicheri, about 12 km west of the city.

Many finds are on display in the Veliko Tarnovo Regional Museum of History.

In 2018, archaeologists found an altar dedicated to the goddess Tyche at a small square in the southwestern corner of the Forum complex, with an inscription in Ancient Greek which is a modified epigram by Demosthenes.

== Gallery ==
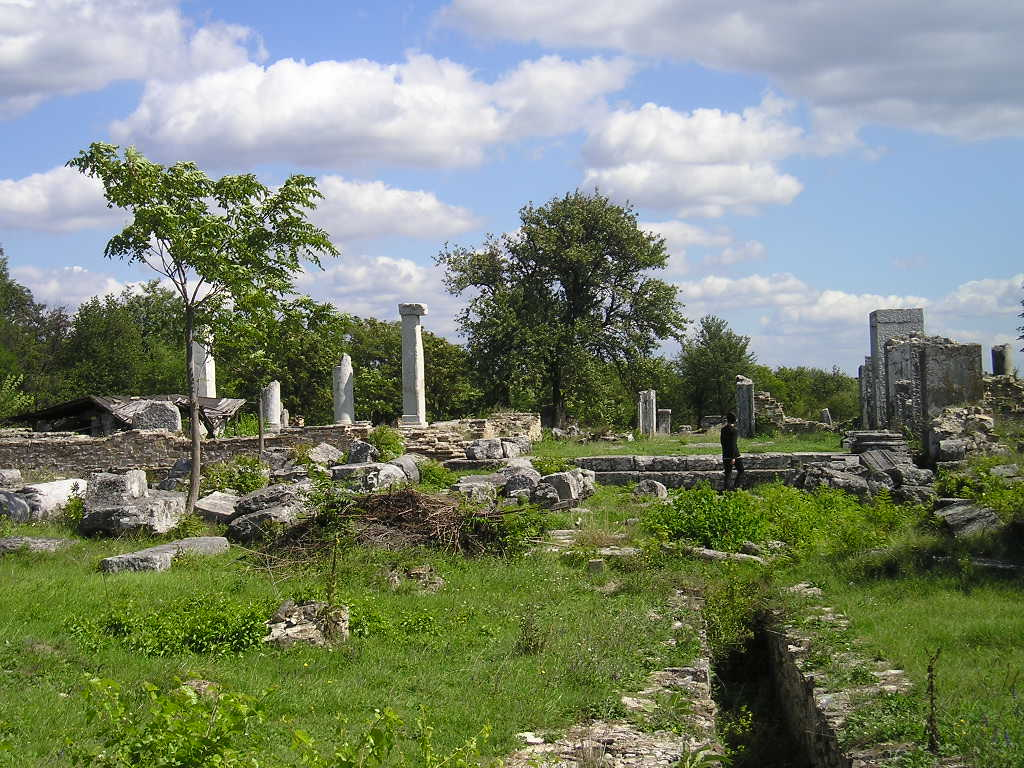
Overview of the ruins of Nicopolis ad Istrum

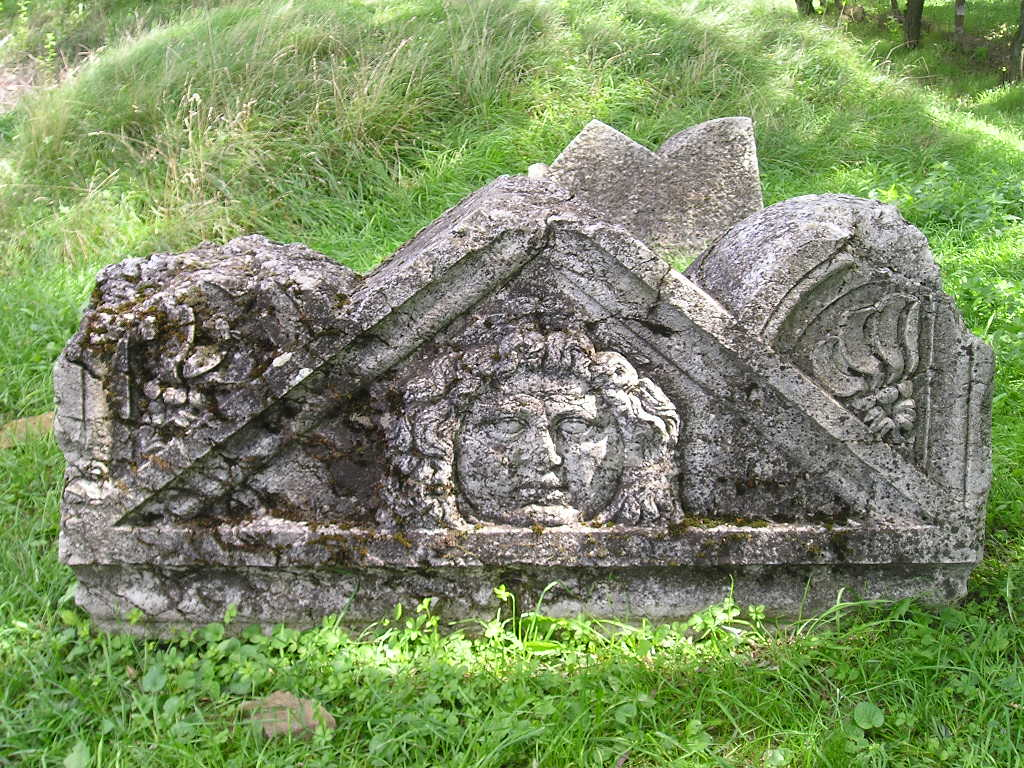
A pediment with a relief image

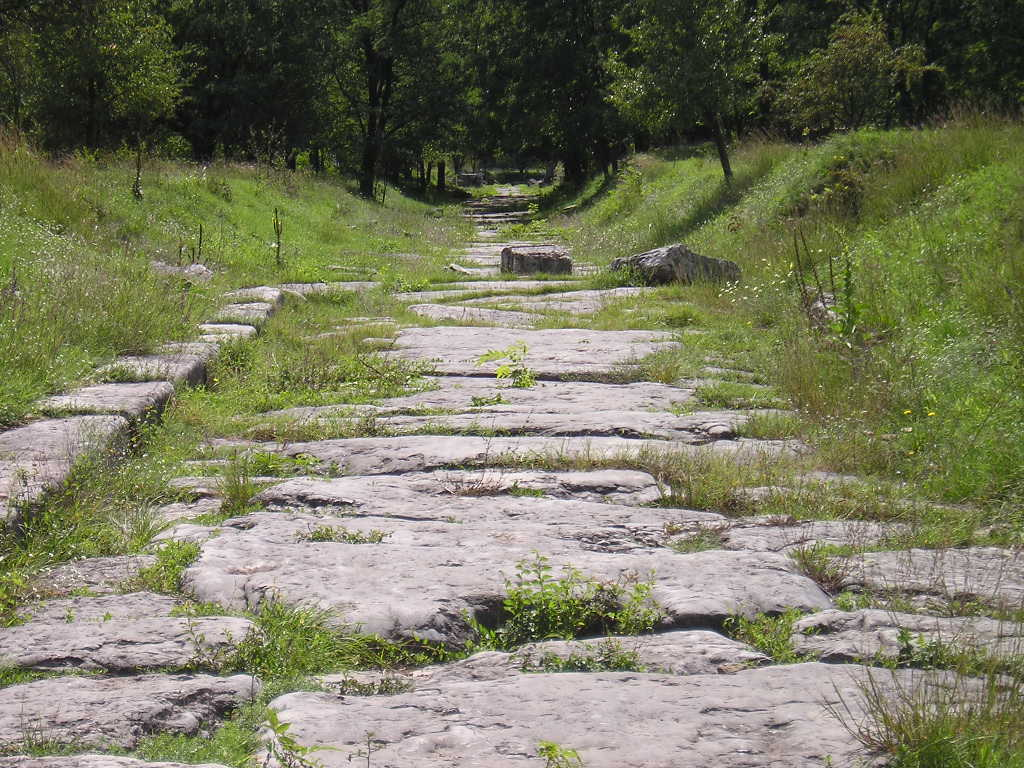
A Roman street, one of the city's main streets running north–south

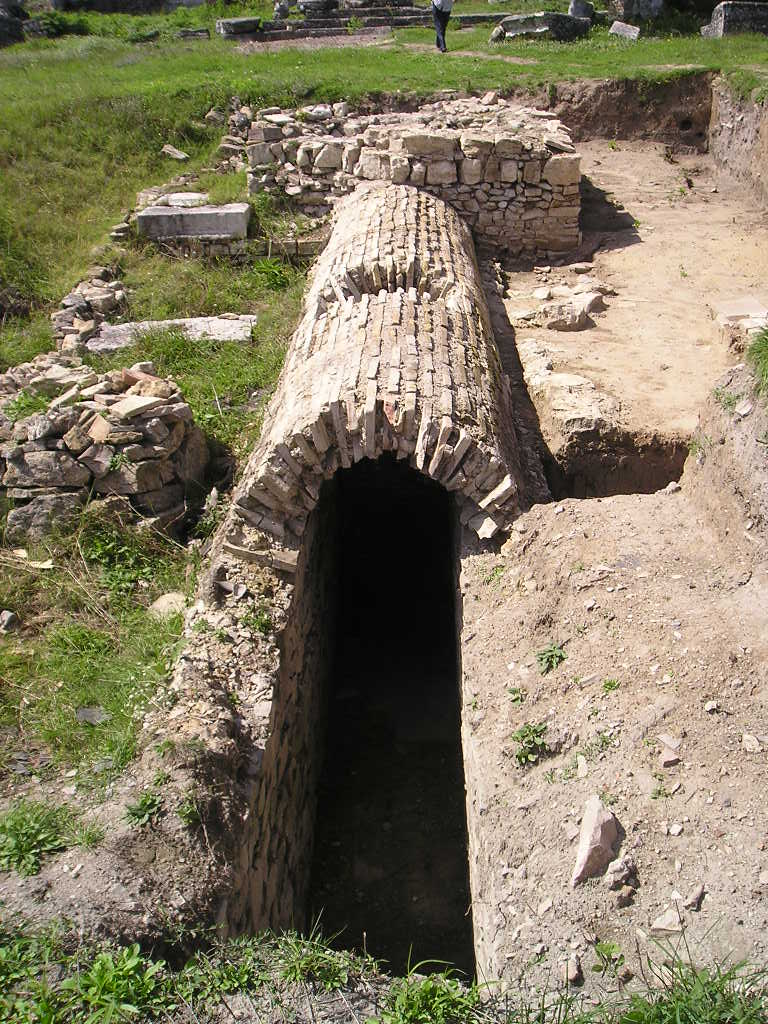
The main city drain

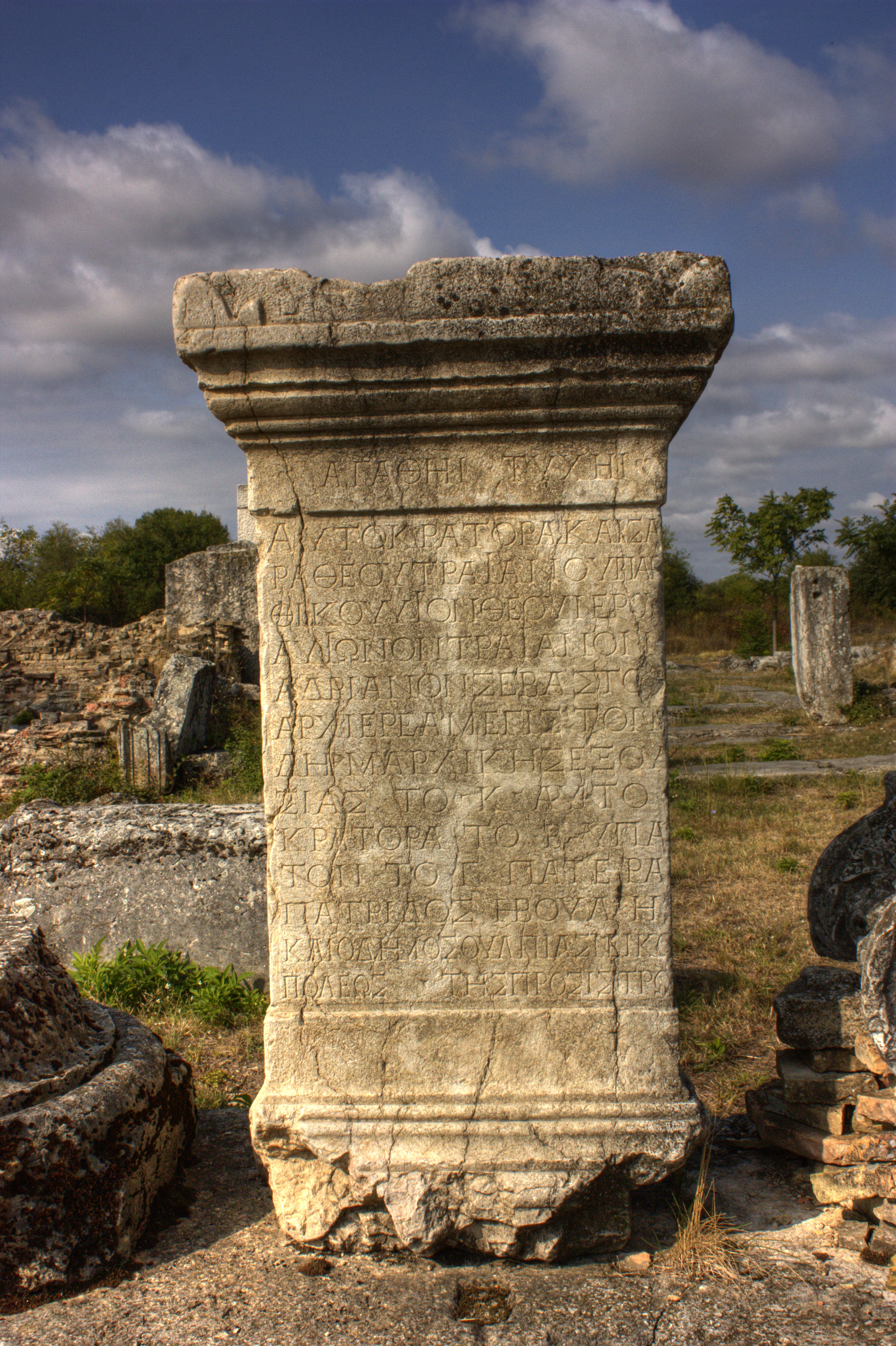
