= Cniva =

Mid-3rd century Gothic king

250-251 Gothic campaign

Cniva (fl. mid-3rd century AD) was a Gothic king who invaded the Roman Empire in the middle of the 3rd century AD. His regnal years are uncertain. He successfully captured the city of Philippopolis (Plovdiv in Bulgaria) in 250 and killed Emperor Decius and his son Herennius Etruscus at the Battle of Abritus as he was attempting to leave the Empire in 251. This was the first time a Roman Emperor had been killed in combat against foreigners. He was allowed by the new Emperor Trebonianus Gallus to leave with his spoils and was paid tribute to stay out of the empire.

== Invasion of Moesia ==
Cniva began the invasion of the Roman Empire when he crossed the Danube. He sent detachments throughout the Roman province of Moesia with forces of Goths and Sarmatians. His considerable forces demanded the attention of the emperor Decius.

The first column of Cniva's army, a detachment of about 20,000 likely led by the chieftains Argaith and Gunteric, besieged Marcianopolis, apparently without success. They probably then headed south to besiege Philippopolis (now Plovdiv in Bulgaria). Cniva's main column under the King himself crossed the Danube at Oescus then headed eastwards to Novae, where he was repelled by the provincial governor (and future emperor) Trebonianus Gallus. The invaders then headed south to plunder Nicopolis ad Istrum where Decius defeated them but not decisively. After these initial setbacks, the Goths moved southwards through the Haemus mountain and Decius pursued them (likely through the Shipka Pass) to save Philippopolis. This time Decius' army was taken by surprise while resting at Beroe/Augusta Traiana. The Romans were heavily defeated in the ensuing battle. Decius was forced to withdraw his army to the north at Oescus, leaving Cniva ample time to ravage Moesia and finally capture Philippopolis in the summer of 251, in part with the help of its commander, a certain Titus Julius Priscus who had proclaimed himself Emperor. It seems that Priscus, after receiving the news of the defeat at Beroe, thought that the Goths would spare him and the city. He was wrong and was probably killed when the city fell. Then the invaders began returning to their homeland, laden with booty and captives, among them many of senatorial rank.

The sack of Philippopolis invigorated Decius, who intercepted several parties of Germans, and repaired and strengthened his fortifications along the Danube, intending to oppose Cniva’s forces.

== Battle of Abritus ==
Probably in July or August of 251, the Roman army engaged the "Scythians" under Cniva near Abritus. The strengths of the belligerent forces are unknown, but we know that Cniva divided his forces into three units, with one of these parts concealed behind a swamp. It seems that Cniva was a skilled tactician and that he was very familiar with the surrounding terrain. Jordanes and Aurelius Victor claim that Herennius Etruscus was killed by an arrow during a skirmish before the outset of the battle and that his father addressed his soldiers as if the loss of his son did not matter. He allegedly said, "Let no one mourn. The death of one soldier is not a great loss to the Republic". However, other sources state that Herennius died with his father.

== Terms of peace ==
After the battle, the new emperor, Trebonianus Gallus, let Cniva leave with his spoils, and aided the Goths' departure. He even promised to pay a tribute to Cniva in order to keep him from invading the empire again.

== Death ==
In 271, the Emperor Aurelian conclusively defeated the Goths and killed their king Cannabaudes in battle. Based on the similarity of the names, that king might coincide with Cniva.

== Sources ==
- Aurelius Victor, De Caesaribus, par. 29.4-5 in Liber de Caesaribus of Sextus Aurelius Victor, critical edition by H. W. Bird, Liverpool University Press, 1994, ISBN 0-85323-218-0
- Bowman A. K., Garnsey P., Cameron A. (ed.). The Cambridge Ancient History - vol XII The Crisis of Empire, Cambridge University Press, 2005. ISBN 0-521-30199-8
- Edward Gibbon, History of the Decline and Fall of the Roman Empire, Chapter 10.
- Potter, David S. The Roman Empire at Bay AD 180–395, Routledge, 2004. ISBN 0-415-10058-5
- Southern, Pat. The Roman Empire from Severus to Constantine, Routledge, 2001. ISBN 0-415-23943-5
- Wolfram, Herwig. History of the Goths (transl. by Thomas J. Dunlap), University of California Press, 1988, ISBN 0-520-06983-8
