= Decius =

Roman emperor from 249 to 251

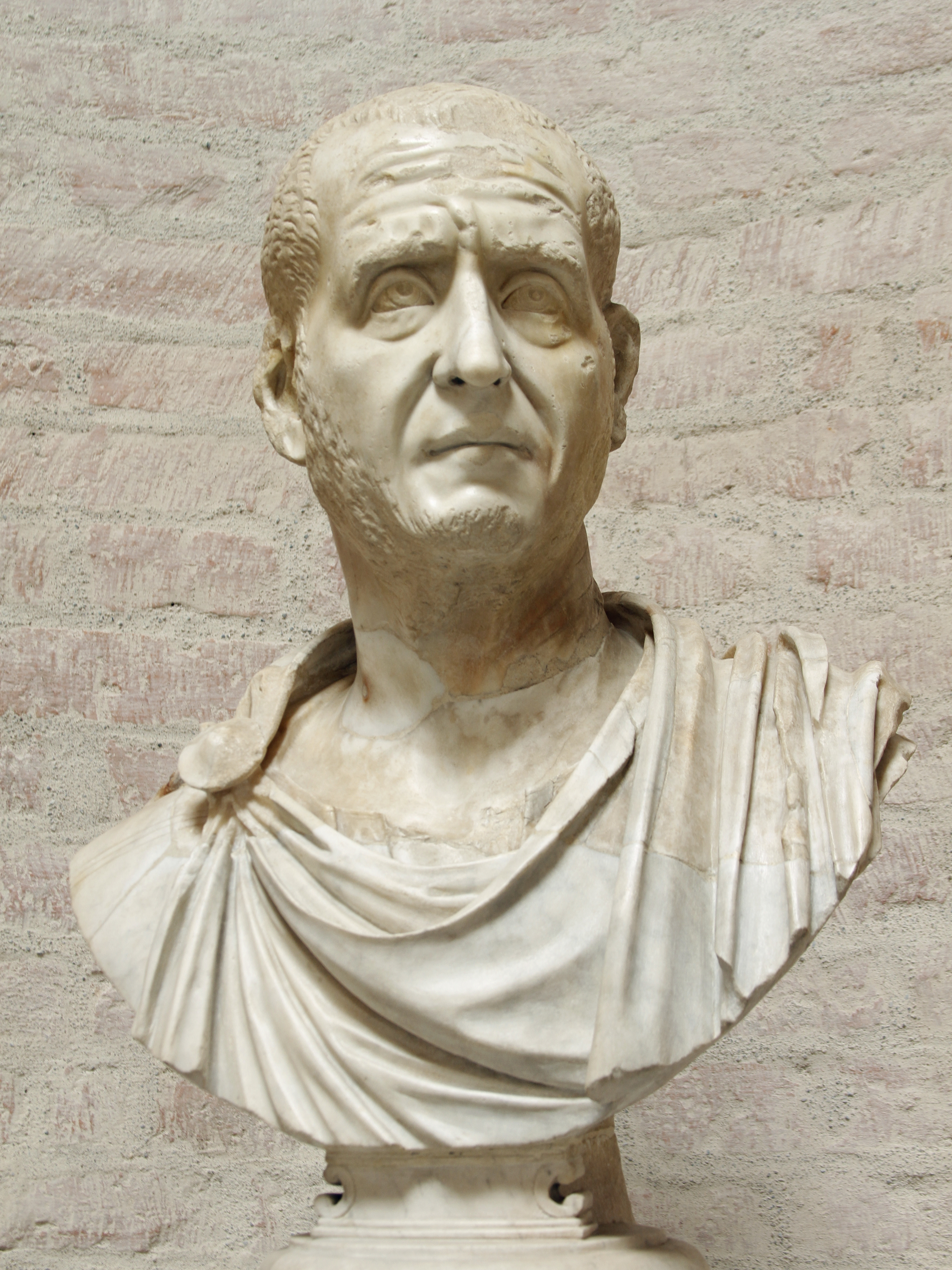
- Bust, Glyptothek, Munich

Roman emperor
- Reign: September 249 – June 251
- Predecessor: Philip the Arab
- Successor: Trebonianus Gallus
- Co-emperor: Herennius Etruscus
- Rival: Licinian
- Born: c. 201; Budalia, Illyricum (modern day Serbia)
- Died: June 251 (aged 49–50); Abritus, Moesia Inferior
- Spouse: Herennia Etruscilla
- Issue: Herennius Etruscus; Hostilian
Names
- Gaius Messius Quintus Decius Valerinus
Regnal name
- Imperator Caesar Gaius Messius Quintus Traianus Decius Augustus
- Religion: Ancient Roman religion

Trajan Decius (Latin: Gaius Messius Quintus Trajanus Decius; c. 201 – June 251), or simply Decius (/ˈdiːʃiəs/), was Roman emperor from 249 to 251. A distinguished politician during the reign of Philip the Arab, Decius was proclaimed emperor by his troops after putting down a rebellion in Moesia. In 249, he defeated and killed Philip near Verona and was recognized as emperor by the Senate afterwards.

During his reign, he attempted to strengthen the Roman state and its religion, leading to the Decian persecution, where a number of prominent Christians (including Pope Fabian) were put to death. In the last year of his reign, Decius co-ruled with his son Herennius Etruscus, until they were both killed by the Goths in the Battle of Abritus.

== Early life and rise to power ==
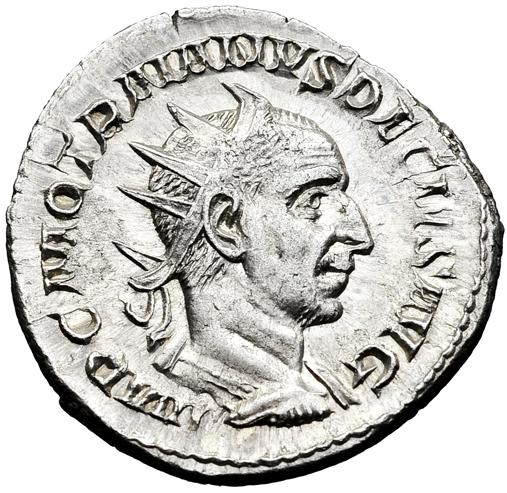
Antoninianus of Trajan Decius. Inscription: IMP. C. M. Q. TRAIANVS DECIVS AVG.

Trajanus Decius was born Gaius Messius Quintus Decius Valerinus at Budalia, Illyricum, near Sirmium in Pannonia Inferior. He was of Oscan descent from the Decia gens. Decius was one of the first among a long succession of Roman emperors (Illyrian emperors) to originate from the Danube provinces, often referred to as Illyricum. Unlike some of his immediate imperial predecessors such as Philip the Arab or Maximinus Thrax who did not have extensive administrative experience before assuming the throne, Decius was a distinguished senator who had served as suffect consul in 232, had been governor of Moesia and Germania Inferior soon afterwards, served as governor of Hispania Tarraconensis between 235 and 238, and was urban prefect of Rome during the early reign of Emperor Philip the Arab.

Around 245, Philip entrusted Decius with an important command on the Danube. By the end of 248 or 249, Decius was sent to quell the revolt of Pacatian and his troops in Moesia and Pannonia; some modern historians see this rebellion as a reflection of emerging Balkan separatism. After the collapse of the revolt, Decius let the troops proclaim him emperor. Philip advanced against him and was killed at Verona, Italy, in September 249. The Senate then recognized Decius as emperor, giving him the attribute Traianus in reference to Emperor Trajan. According to the Byzantine historian Zosimus, Decius was clothed in purple and forced to undertake the [burdens of] government, despite his reluctance and unwillingness.

== Political and monumental initiatives ==
Decius' political program was focused on the restoration of the strength of the State, both militarily opposing the external threats, and restoring the public piety with a program of renovation of the state religion.

Either as a concession to the Senate, or perhaps with the idea of improving public morality, Decius endeavoured to revive the separate office and authority of the censor. He left the choice of candidate to the Senate, who unanimously selected Valerian (the future emperor). Seeing the office as difficult and potentially dangerous, Valerian declined it. The invasion of the Goths and Decius's death put an end to the abortive attempt.

Decius sponsored several building projects in Rome, including the Baths of Decius (Thermae Decianae) on the Aventine Hill. Completed in 252, the building survived through to the 16th century. He also repaired the Colosseum, which had been damaged by lightning strikes.

== Persecution of Christians ==
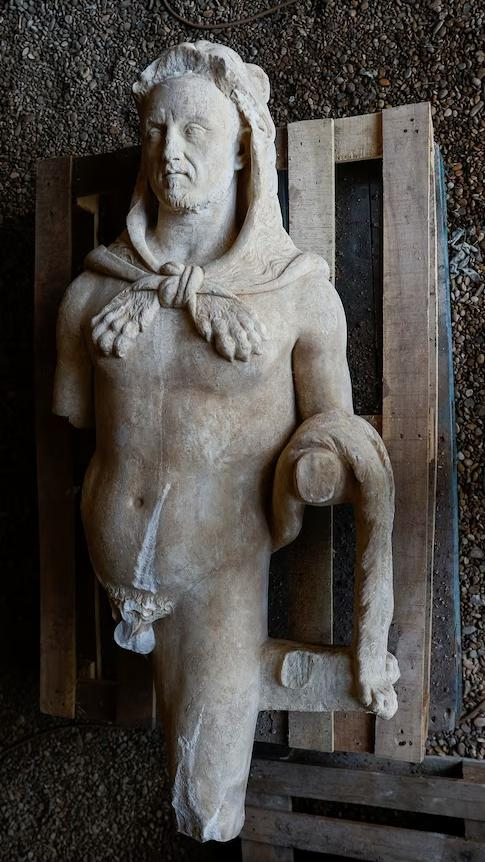
A marble statue of Emperor Decius dressed as Hercules discovered on 25 January 2023 during sewer repair works in Rome.

In late 249, Decius issued an imperial edict on sacrifices:

All the inhabitants of the empire were required to sacrifice before the magistrates of their community "for the safety of the empire" by a certain day (the date would vary from place to place and the order may have been that the sacrifice had to be completed within a specified period after a community received the edict). When they sacrificed they would obtain a certificate (libellus) recording the fact that they had complied with the order. That is, the certificate would testify the sacrificant's loyalty to the ancestral gods and to the consumption of sacrificial food and drink as well as the names of the officials who were overseeing the sacrifice.

According to D. S. Potter, Decius did not try to impose the superiority of the Roman pantheon over any other gods. It is very probable that the edict was an attempt to legitimize his position and to respond to a general unease provoked by the passing of the Roman millennium. While Decius himself may have intended the edict as a way to reaffirm his conservative vision of the Pax Romana and to reassure Rome's citizens that the empire was still secure, it nevertheless sparked a "terrible crisis of authority as various Christian bishops and their flocks reacted to it in different ways." Measures were first taken demanding that the bishops and officers of the church make a sacrifice for the emperor. The sacrifice was "on behalf of" (Latin pro) the emperor, not to the emperor, since a living emperor was not considered divine. Certificates were issued to those who satisfied the commissioners during the persecution of Christians under Decius. Forty-six such certificates have been published, all dating from 250, four of them from Oxyrhynchus. Anyone, including Christian followers, who refused to offer a sacrifice for the emperor and the Empire's well-being by a specified date risked torture and execution. A number of prominent Christians did, in fact, refuse to make a sacrifice and were killed in the process, including Pope Fabian himself in 250, and "anti-Christian feeling[s] led to killings at Carthage and Alexandria." However, towards the end of the second year of Decius' reign, "the ferocity of the [anti-Christian] persecution had eased off, and the earlier tradition of tolerance had begun to reassert itself." Christians bore the brunt of the persecution and never forgot the reign of Decius, whom they remembered as "that fierce tyrant". In June 251 Decius died alongside his co-emperor Herennius Etruscus in the Battle Abrittus against the Goths; their successors Trebonianus Gallus and Hostilian rescinded Decius' decree, ending the persecution after approximately eighteen months.

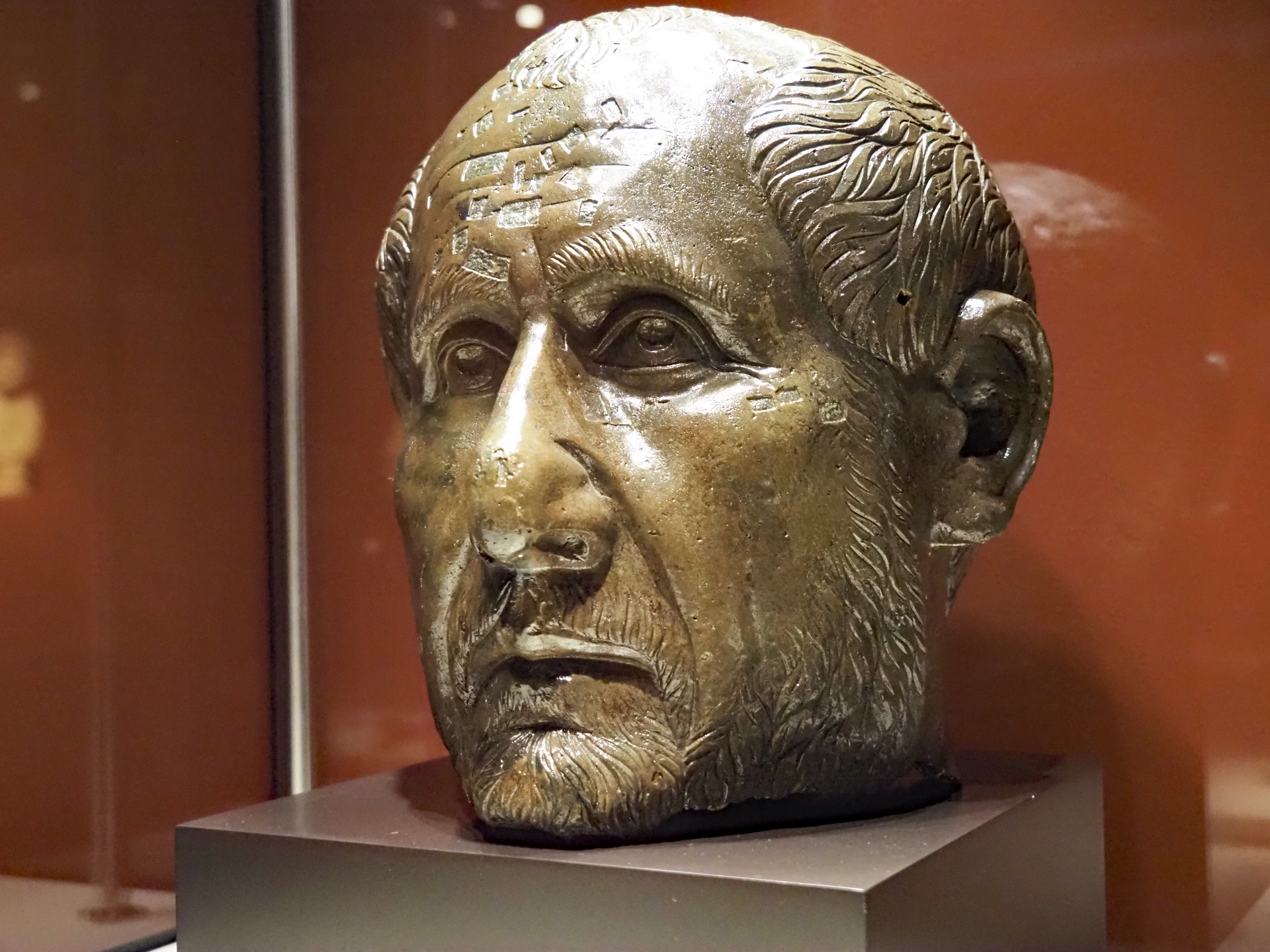
Bronze head of Decius from the former Colonia Ulpia Traiana Sarmizegetusa. National History Museum of Romania, Bucharest.

At this time, there was a second outbreak of the Antonine Plague, which at its height from 251 to 266, took the lives of 5,000 daily in Rome. This outbreak is referred to as the "Plague of Cyprian" (Cyprian was the bishop of Carthage, where both the plague and the persecution of Christians were especially severe). Cyprian's biographer Pontius gave a vivid picture of the demoralizing effects of the plague and Cyprian moralized the event in his essay De mortalitate. In Carthage, the "Decian persecution", unleashed at the onset of the plague, sought out Christian scapegoats. Decius' edicts were renewed under Valerian in 253 and repealed under his son, Gallienus, in 260–261.

== Campaigns against the Goths and death ==
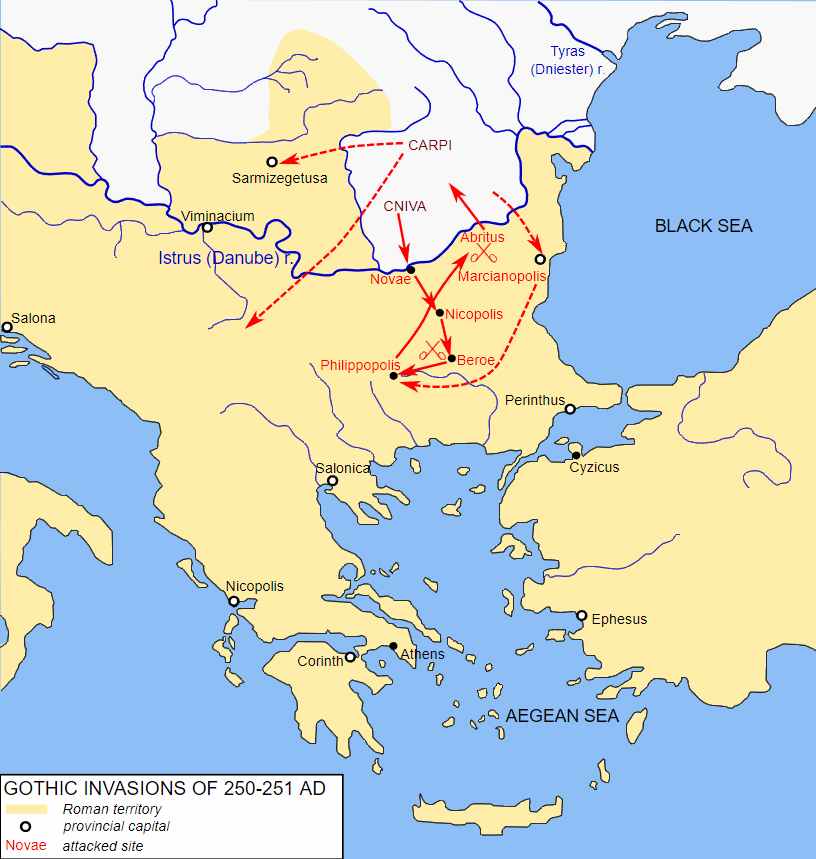
The Gothic invasions of 250–251

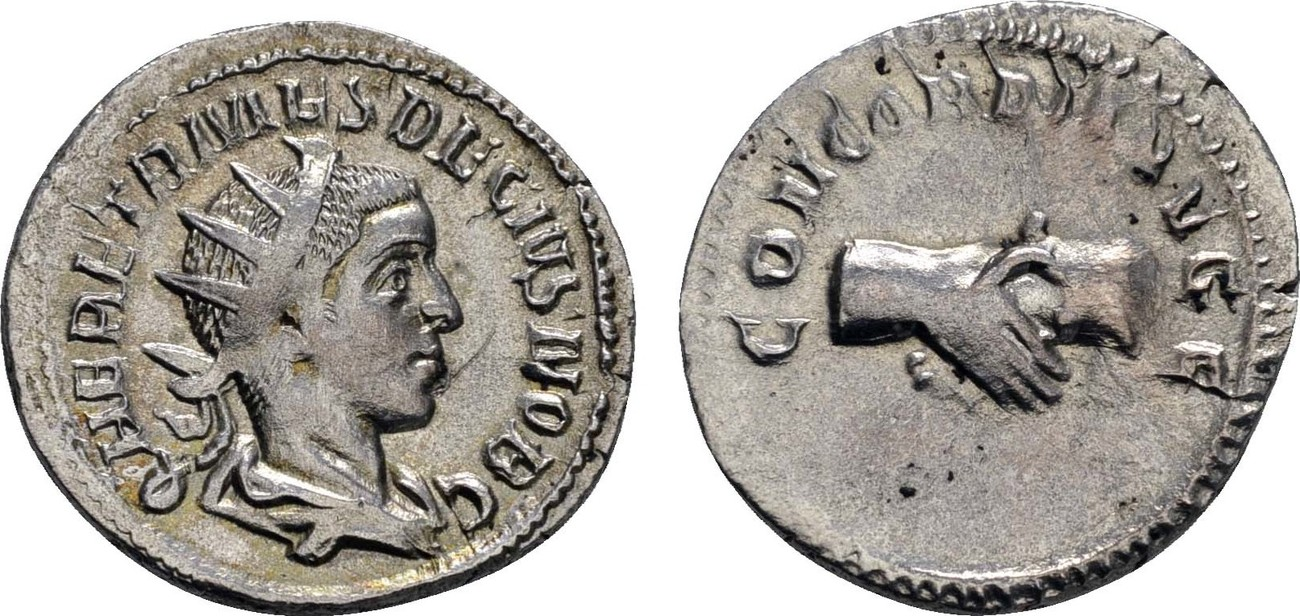
Coin of Herennius Etruscus. Inscription: HER. ETR. MES. DECIVS NOB. C. / CONCORDIA AVG. F.

The barbarian incursions into the Empire were becoming more daring and frequent whereas the Empire was facing a serious economic crisis in Decius' time. During his brief reign, Decius engaged in important operations against the Goths, who crossed the Danube to raid districts of Moesia and Thrace. This is the first considerable occasion that the Goths – who would later come to play such an important role – appear in the historical record. The Goths under King Cniva were surprised by the emperor while besieging Nicopolis on the Danube; the Goths fled through the difficult terrain of the Balkans, but then doubled back and surprised the Romans near Beroë (modern Stara Zagora), sacking their camp and dispersing the Roman troops (Battle of Beroe). The Goths then moved to attack Philippopolis (modern Plovdiv), which fell into their hands. The governor of Thrace, Titus Julius Priscus, declared himself emperor under Gothic protection in opposition to Decius but Priscus' challenge was rendered moot when he was killed soon afterwards. Then the invaders began returning to their homeland, laden with booty and captives, among them many of senatorial rank.

In the meantime, Decius had returned with his re-organized army, accompanied by his son Herennius Etruscus and the general Trebonianus Gallus, intending to defeat the invaders and recover the booty. The final engagement, the battle of Abritus, in which the Goths fought with the courage of despair, under the command of Cniva, took place during the second week of June 251 on swampy ground in the Ludogorie (region in northeastern Bulgaria which merges with Dobruja plateau and the Danube Plain to the north) near the small settlement of Abritus or Forum Terebronii (modern Razgrad). Jordanes records that Decius' son Herennius Etruscus was killed by an arrow early in the battle, and to cheer his men Decius exclaimed, "Let no one mourn; the death of one soldier is not a great loss to the republic." Nevertheless, Decius' army was entangled in the swamp and annihilated in this battle, while he himself was killed on the field of battle. As the historian Aurelius Victor relates:

The Decii (i.e., Decius and his son), while pursuing the barbarians across the Danube, died through treachery at Abritus after reigning two years. ... Very many report that the son had fallen in battle while pressing an attack too boldly; that the father however, has strenuously asserted that the loss of one soldier seemed to him too little to matter. And so he resumed the war and died in a similar manner while fighting vigorously.

One literary tradition claims that Decius was betrayed by his successor, Trebonianus Gallus, who was involved in a secret alliance with the Goths, but this cannot be substantiated and was most likely a later invention since Gallus felt compelled to adopt Decius' younger son, Gaius Valens Hostilianus, as joint emperor even though the latter was too young to rule in his own right. It is also unlikely that the shattered Roman legions would proclaim as emperor a traitor who was responsible for the loss of so many soldiers from their ranks. Decius was the first Roman emperor to die in battle against a foreign enemy.

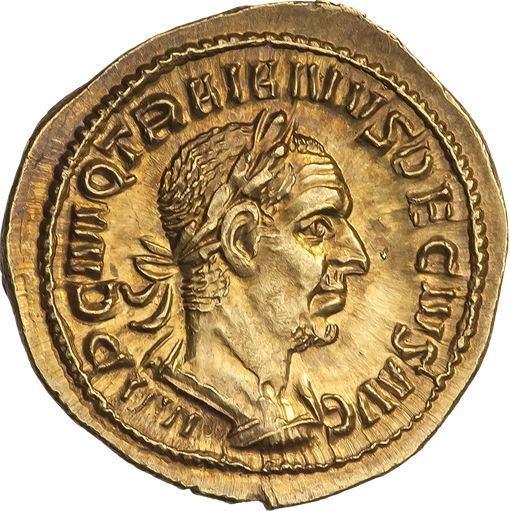
Aureus of Decius.

== Legacy ==
The Decian persecution was the first organized persecution of Christians in the Roman Empire and served as the basis for the Diocletianic Persecution, the last major persecution of Christians in the Empire.

The later telling of the Seven Sleepers, about seven Christian youths from Ephesus who fled the Decian persecution by hiding in a cave (walled up by Decius) and sleeping for almost 300 years, emerged. The Quranic account, captured in Al-Kahf ("The Cave") surah (chapter), has led to the Persian saying of ahd-e daqyānus ("age of Decius") or daqyānus referring to ancient times or a person with outdated views. When something is old and outdated, people say, "this belongs to the age of Decius."

== See also ==
- List of Roman emperors

== Sources ==
- Cooley, Alison E. (2012). The Cambridge Manual of Latin Epigraphy. Cambridge University Press. ISBN 978-0-521-84026-2.
- Potter, David S. The Roman Empire at Bay AD 180–395, Routledge, 2004. ISBN 0-415-10058-5.
- Scarre, Chris, Chronicle of the Roman Emperors: the reign-by-reign record of the rulers of Imperial Rome, Thames & Hudson, 1995. ISBN 0-500-05077-5
- Southern, Pat. The Roman Empire from Severus to Constantine, Routledge, 2001. ISBN 0-415-23943-5.
- Wolfram, Herwig. History of the Goths (transl. by Thomas J. Dunlap), University of California Press, 1988, ISBN 0-520-06983-8.

Regnal titles
Preceded by Philip the Arab	Roman emperor 249–251; With: Herennius Etruscus (251)	Succeeded by Trebonianus Gallus and Hostilian
Political offices
Preceded by L. Fulvius Gavius Numisius Aemilianus; L. Naevius Aquilinus	Roman consul 250–251 with Vettius Gratus; Herennius Etruscus	Succeeded by Trebonianus Gallus; Volusianus
