= Novae (fortress) =

Roman legionary fortresses in northern Bulgaria

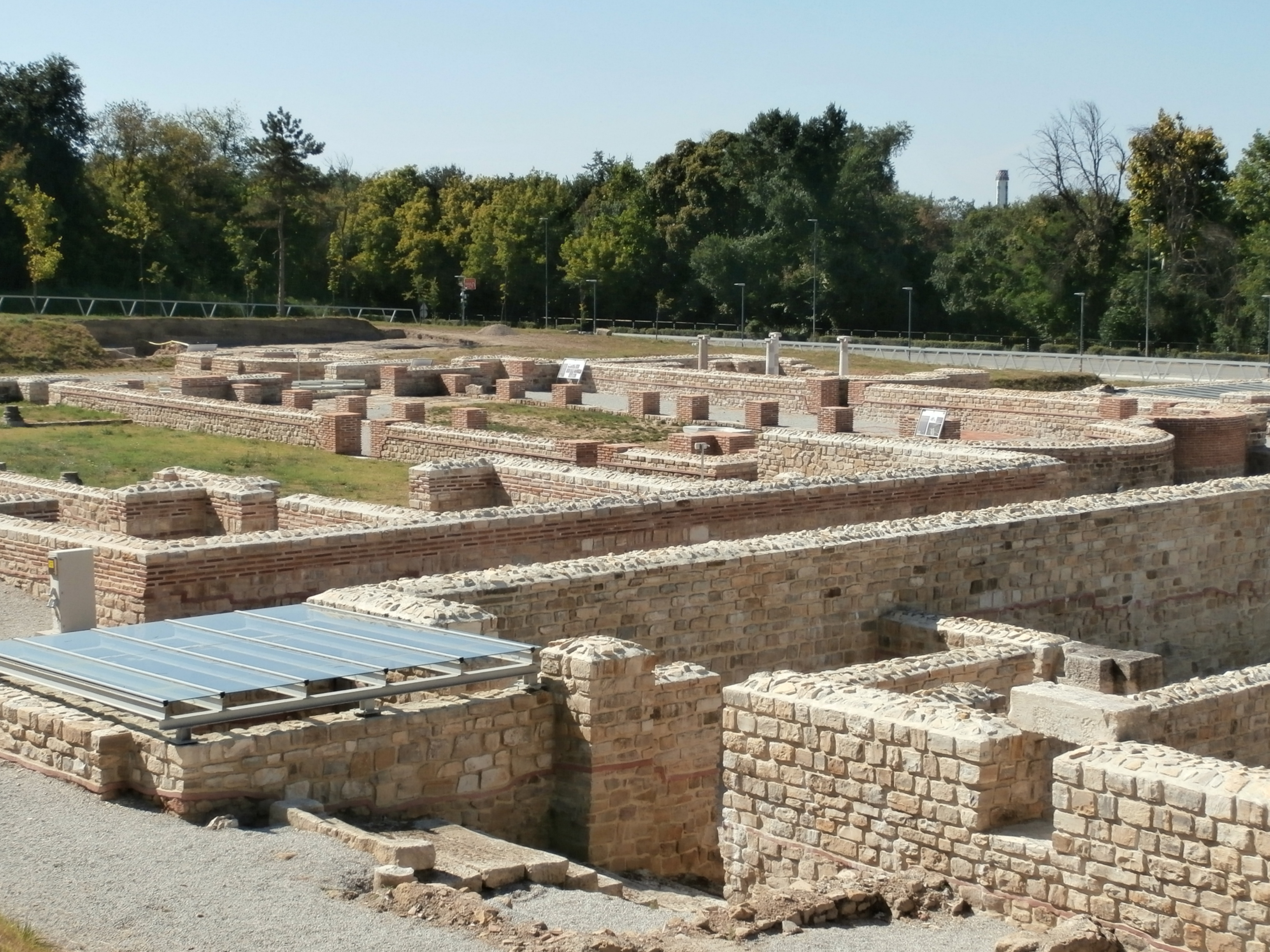
- Legionary fortress with later Bishop's palace and cathedral

- Location within Bulgaria
- 43°36′46.4″N 25°23′39.4″E
- Type: Settlement

Site notes
- Owner: Public
- Public access: Yes

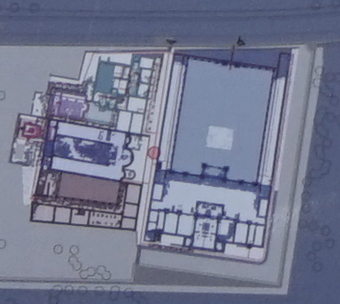
Plan of Novae showing the Legionary fortress headquarters and adjoining later Bishop's palace

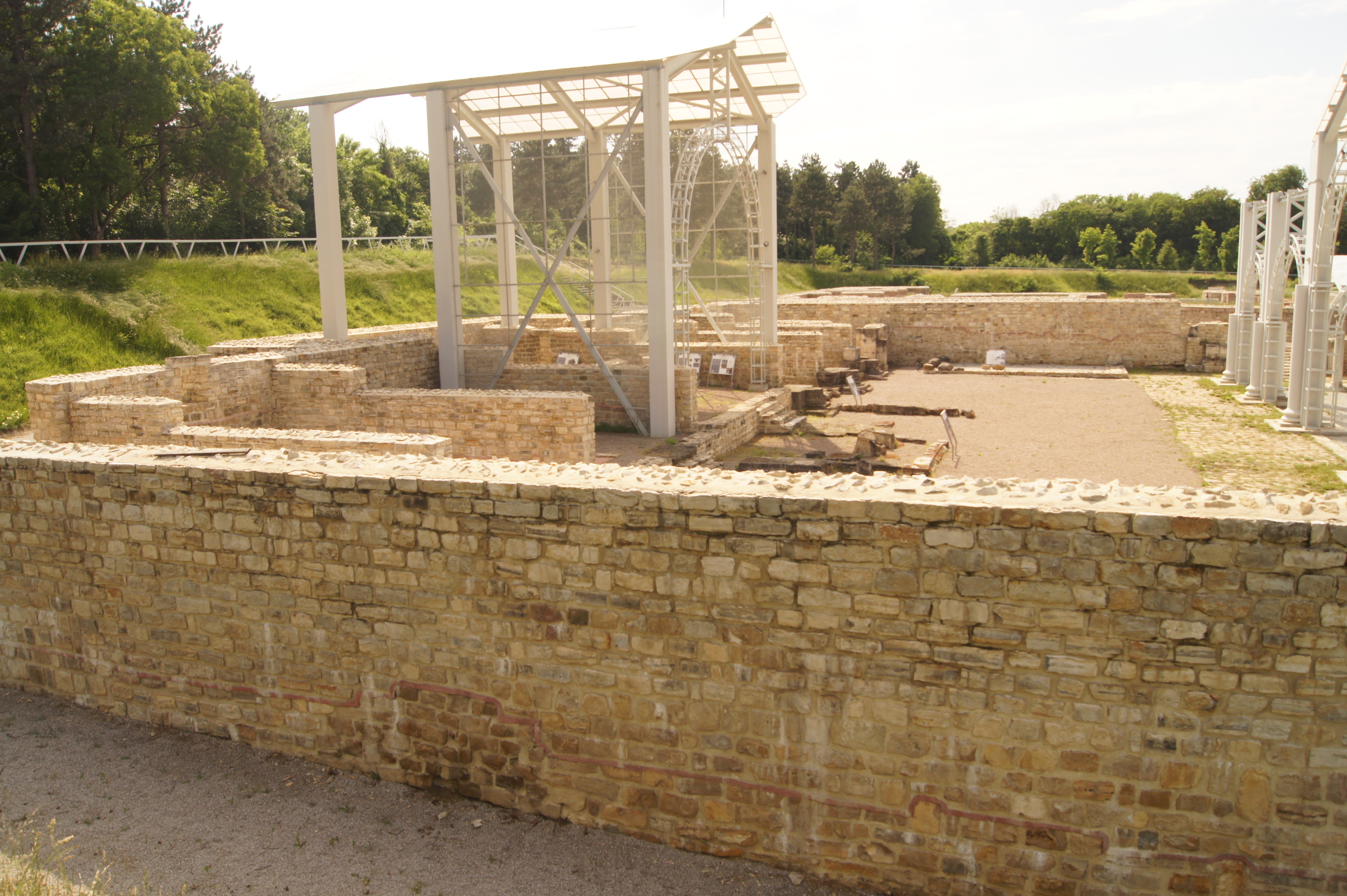
Legionary fortress headquarters (principia)

Novae was a Roman legionary fortress along the empire's border found in modern-day Bulgaria. It was part of a series of frontier defences (limes Moesiae) along the Danube. The settlement later expanded into a town in the Roman province of Moesia Inferior, later Moesia Secunda.

It lies about 4 km east of the modern town of Svishtov.

The fortress is one of the few along the limes to have been excavated and now open to the public.

== Location and topography ==
Novae is situated on the southern bank of the Danube at Pametnicite near Svishtov.

The legionary fortress (castra legionis) covers an area of 18 hectares on a slope towards the river-bank, its highest point in the southern part of the site being 30m higher. Its topography resulted in terraced levels within the defensive walls.

At present mainly the central part of the site has been excavated and restored.

== History and archaeology ==
Permanent Roman military presence in the Lower Danubian region started after Augustus had established himself as sole ruler of the Roman state in 30 BC. He adopted a strategy to move the empire's south-eastern European border from Macedonia to the line of the Danube, which provided a major river supply route between the Roman armies in the region. Marcus Licinius Crassus fought a successful campaign against the Moesi and Augustus formally proclaimed victory in 27 BC. The region was organised as the Roman province of Moesia in the last years of Augustus' reign, around 6 AD.

Around 45 AD Legio VIII Augusta took part in the suppression of the Thracian uprising, and founded its fortress at Novae. The site was chosen to control a river crossing and the key section of the Danube from the mouth of the Osum River (Asamus) up to the mouth of the Yantra River, near Iatrus. This choice of site led to later successes.

After the death of Nero, the dislocation of many legions within the Empire resulted in replacement by emperor Vespasian in 69–70 AD of Legio VIII Augusta by Legio I Italica, which stayed in Novae until at least the 430s. In 86, the province was divided and Novae, together with Durostorum, became one of two legionary bases within the borders of Moesia Inferior. Novae did not suffer significant damage during the Dacian wars of Domitian (85–89), which may indicate that the main operations took place in the western and eastern part of the province. The legion was followed by craftsmen, servicemen, traders and other camp followers who settled down in the fortress vicinity, creating a canabae legionis. At the same time another settlement called Ostrite Mogili emerged ca. 3 km to the east of the camp.

Novae served as a base of operations for Roman and Byzantine campaigns against Barbarian tribes such as Trajan's Dacian Wars and Maurice's Balkan campaigns. The legion was also responsible for bridge construction over the Danube.

Until the Flavian period, the fortress walls were built from earth and wood. During the campaigns of Trajan the walls were replaced by stone wall up to 3m thick with square towers. Apart from the new defensive walls, the monumental building of headquarters (principia) with the new Trajanic basilica, and the new building of a hospital (valetudinarium) were built at the place of the former Flavian baths (thermae). During the Antonine period, the legion may have controlled the area beyond the Yantra River. Novae (and the surrounding province) was most prosperous during the Severan dynasty.

In 250 Novae was attacked by the Goths of Cniva but escaped damage, although the canabae and the nearby settlements were completely destroyed. In the second half of the 3rd century Novae was systematically attacked and destroyed by barbarians. From the 4th century onwards when the legion was divided into detachments occupying small forts and fortlets, civil buildings constituted the main part of internal buildings of Novae. The new streets with pavements were built from re-used stone, often bearing inscriptions. Many glass workshops were established in the town and surrounding area. At some point the area of 8 ha to the east of the legionary base was surrounded by the new defensive walls.

The latest evidence for the presence of the legion is dated by a series of inscriptions from 430, 431 and 432.

In the late 5th and 6th centuries, the town of Novae was the seat of a bishop. The cathedral and neighbouring buildings were built over the legionary barracks west of the former legion headquarters. The last period of prosperity was during the reign of Justinian (527–565), when the defensive walls were rebuilt and reinforced, but attacks of Slavs and Avars eventually ended the existence of the ancient town. In 9th–11th centuries, a church and a cemetery existed in the western part of the town.

Novae was the home of a saint named Lupus, who was a slave of St. Demetrius and martyred by beheading. He is venerated in the Orthodox tradition.

Recent excavations have revealed the via principalis and other buildings. In 2018, possible Roman soldiers' burials were discovered near Novae.

== Civilian settlements and the extramural area ==
The civil settlement (canabae legionis) was situated to the west of the legionary base. Another civil vicus has been located over 2 km east of the fortress, at Ostrite Mogili. One of the settlements was granted municipal rights, but only one inscription testifies this status. A splendid villa to the west of the defensive walls, within the canabae, which may have been an official residence, was destroyed by the Gothic invasions in mid-3rd century.

Other minor settlements and places of cult have been located but not systematically excavated.

The area to the south-east and east of the fortress was occupied by the necropolis, which was recently excavated. It has been suggested that military amphitheater was situated on the north-eastern side of the camp.

Water supply to the fortress, particularly the baths, including the nearby nymphaeum, and to the town was ensured by three known aqueducts, one of which was at least 9 km long and fed the distribution tank (castellum divisorum) at the south-east corner of the fortress.

During the late Roman period, the town was enlarged by a new line of defensive walls and covered 26 hectares jointly with the former legionary base.

== Name of the site ==
Novae (Novae) may have referred to the canabae (canabae legionis I Italicae Novae), when the fortress itself had the name castra legionis I Italicae. Literary sources give the name of Novae (in accusative form Novas). The Greek transcription Nόβας is attested by Procopius, Theophanes Confessor and Anonymous Ravennatis. The Greek form Nόβαι appears rather rare; an earlier form mentioned by Ptolemy is Nooῦαι.

One hypothesis derives the name from Νόης Nóēs, a river mentioned by Herodotus, which is then identified with the stream (now variously known as Dermendere, Tekirdere, Golyamata Bara, or Belyanovsko Dere) at whose mouth the fortress was located.

== Literature ==
- E. Genčeva, P”rviât voenen lager v Novae (Dolna Miziâ), Sofia-Warszawa 2002.
- L. Press, T. Sarnowski, Novae. Römisches Legionslager und frühbyzantinische Stadt an der unteren Donau, Antike Welt 21, 1990, 22.
- T. Sarnowski, Fortress of the Legio I Italica at Novae, Akten des XI. Intern. Limeskongresses (Szekesfehervar, 30.8.–6.9.1976), 415–424.
- T. Sarnowski, La fortresse de la legion I Italica et le limes du sud-est de la Dacie, Eos 71, 1983, p. 265–276.
- T. Sarnowski, Novae in the Notitia Dignitatum, Archeologia (Warszawa) 57, 2007 (2008).
- T. Sarnowski, The Name of Novae in Lower Moesia, Archeologia (Warszawa) 57, 2007(2008).
- A. Tomas, Living with the Army, vol. I. Civil Settlements near Roman Legionary Fortresses in Lower Moesia, Warszawa 2017.
- IGLNov Inscriptions grecques et latines de Novae (Mésie inférieure), J. Kolendo, V. Božilova [red.], Bordeaux 1997.
