= Titus Julius Priscus =

Roman imperial usurper (died c. 251)

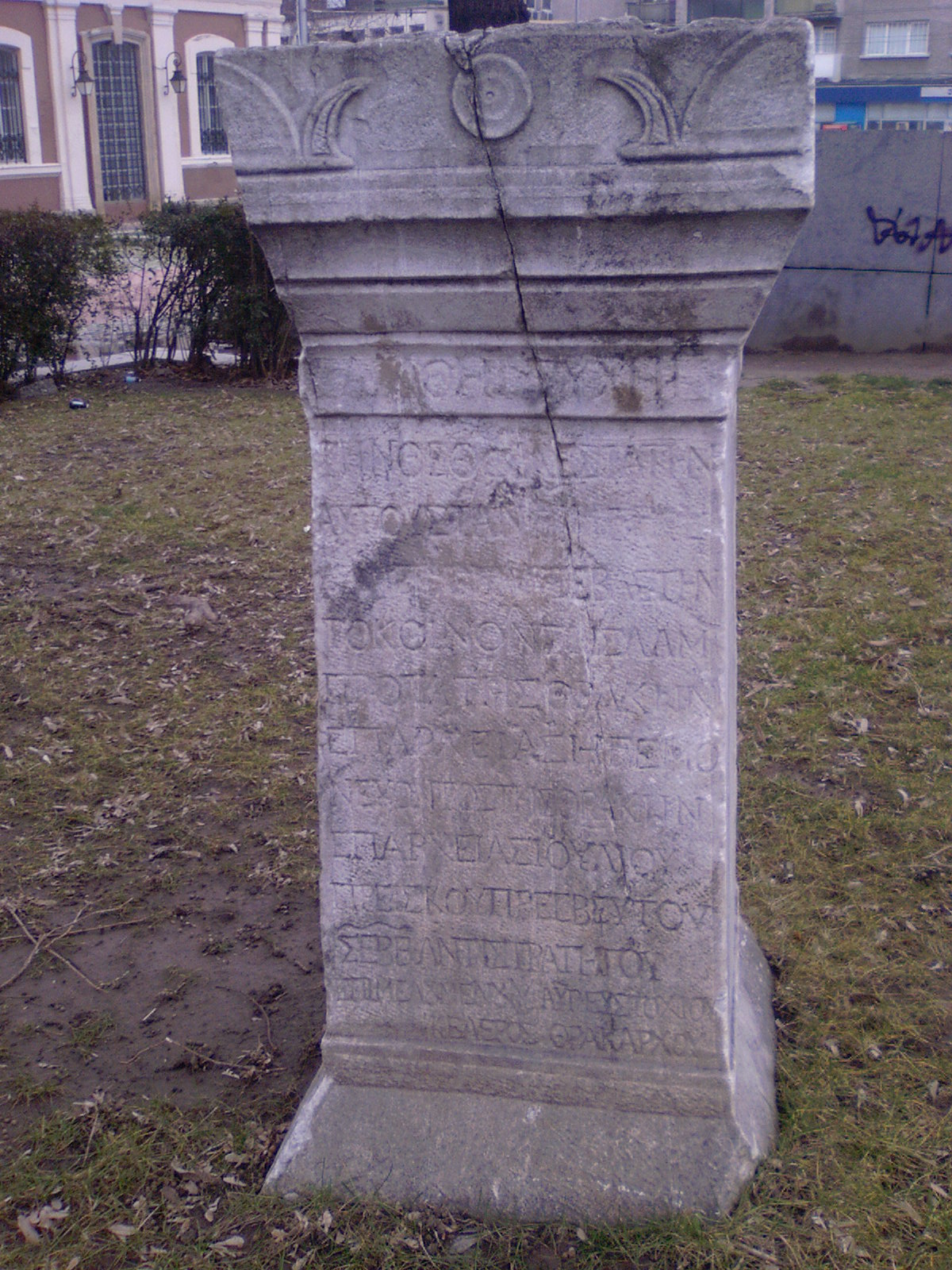

Titus Julius Priscus was a mid-3rd-century Roman usurper.

He was the governor of Thrace, and proclaimed himself Emperor in opposition to Emperor Decius at Philippopolis towards the end of 251, probably with Gothic collusion following their successful siege at the Battle of Philippopolis. The Roman Senate declared him a public enemy almost as soon as he attempted to usurp the throne. Priscus was killed shortly after his proclamation.

It has been proposed that Priscus may be the same as or the son of the governor Gaius Julius Priscus, who was the brother of emperor Philip the Arab.
