= 251 =

251 in various calendars
- Gregorian calendar: 251; CCLI
- Ab urbe condita: 1004
- Assyrian calendar: 5001
- Balinese saka calendar: 172–173
- Bengali calendar: −343 – −342
- Berber calendar: 1201
- Buddhist calendar: 795
- Burmese calendar: −387
- Byzantine calendar: 5759–5760
- Chinese calendar: 庚午年 (Metal Horse); 2948 or 2741 — to — 辛未年 (Metal Goat); 2949 or 2742
- Coptic calendar: −33 – −32
- Discordian calendar: 1417
- Ethiopian calendar: 243–244
- Hebrew calendar: 4011–4012
- Hindu calendars
- Vikram Samvat: 307–308
- Shaka Samvat: 172–173
- Kali Yuga: 3351–3352
- Holocene calendar: 10251
- Iranian calendar: 371 BP – 370 BP
- Islamic calendar: 382 BH – 381 BH
- Javanese calendar: 129–130
- Julian calendar: 251; CCLI
- Korean calendar: 2584
- Minguo calendar: 1661 before ROC 民前1661年
- Nanakshahi calendar: −1217
- Seleucid era: 562/563 AG
- Thai solar calendar: 793–794
- Tibetan calendar: ལྕགས་ཕོ་རྟ་ལོ་ (male Iron-Horse); 377 or −4 or −776 — to — ལྕགས་མོ་ལུག་ལོ་ (female Iron-Sheep); 378 or −3 or −775

Gothic Invasion 250-251

Year 251 (CCLI) was a common year starting on Wednesday of the Julian calendar. At the time, in the Roman Empire, it was known as the Year of the Consulship of Traianus and Etruscus (or, less frequently, year 1004 Ab urbe condita). The denomination 251 for this year has been used since the early medieval period, when the Anno Domini calendar era became the prevalent method in Europe for naming years.

== Events ==
=== By place ===
==== Roman Empire ====
- July 1 – Battle of Abritus: The Goths defeat Emperor Decius and his son Herennius Etruscus, on swampy ground in the Dobruja (Moesia).
- May – The first Synod of Carthage, a pre-ecumenical council, is held under the presidency of Saint Cyprian.
- In Rome, Hostilian, son of Decius, succeeds his father, while Trebonianus Gallus is proclaimed Emperor by the troops. Gallus accepts him as co-emperor, but an outbreak of plague strikes the city, and kills Hostilian.
- The prosperity of Roman Britain declines during this period, as the Germanic tribes of the Franks and Saxons, whose homelands are in Friesland and the Low Countries, make raids around the southeast coast.
- Gallus makes peace with the Goths; he permits them to keep their plunder, and offers them a bribe not to return.
- A 15-year plague begins in the Roman Empire.

==== Persia ====
- Sassanid King Shapur I orders an invasion of Syria, with the intent of finally capturing the city of Antioch during the campaign of 251–254.

==== China ====
- Wang Ling's rebellion against the Wei regent Sima Yi is quelled.
- Sima Yi passes away in Luoyang.
- Sima Shi, Sima Yi's eldest son, inherits his father's authority.

=== By topic ===
==== Religion ====
- March – Pope Cornelius succeeds Pope Fabian as the 21st pope.

== Births ==
- January 12 – Anthony the Great, Christian monk and saint (d. 356)

== Deaths ==
- February 5 – Cao Lin, Chinese prince of the Cao Wei state
- June – August
  - Decius, Roman emperor (killed after the battle of Abritus)
  - Herennius Etruscus, Roman emperor and son of Decius
- June 15 – Wang Ling, Chinese general and politician
- August 22 – Zhen, Chinese empress of the Cao Wei state
- September 7 – Sima Yi, Chinese general and regent (b. 179)
- Agatha of Sicily, Christian martyr and saint (approximate date)
- Cao Biao, Chinese prince of the Cao Wei state (b. 195)
- Deng Zhi, Chinese general, politician and diplomat
- Hostilian, Roman emperor (of plague in Rome)
- Lü Yi, Chinese official, governor and politician
