= List of Augustae =

Roman imperial title

Augusta (Classical Latin: [au̯ˈɡʊsta]; plural Augustae; Greek: αὐγούστα) was a Roman imperial honorific title given to empresses and women of the imperial families. It was the feminine form of Augustus.

In the second and third centuries, Augustae could also receive the title of Mater Castrorum ("Mother of the Camp") or Mater Castrorum et Senatus et Patriae ("Mother of the Camp, Senate and Fatherland").

The title implied the greatest prestige. Augustae could issue their own coinage, wear imperial regalia, and rule their own courts.

Agrippina, the wife of Claudius, was the first living wife of the emperor in Roman history to receive the title of Augusta, a position she held for the rest of her life, ruling with her husband and son.

In the third century, Julia Domna was the first empress to receive the combined title Pia Felix Augusta after the death of her husband Septimius Severus, which may have implied greater powers being vested in her than was usual for a Roman empress mother. In this official position and honor, she accompanied her son on an extensive military campaign and provincial tour.

== Principate period ==
=== Julio-Claudian dynasty ===
Portrait	Name	Birth	Date of naming	Description	Death
	Livia; Livia Drvsilla; Ivlia Avgvsta	30 January 58 BC	AD 14	Wife of Emperor Augustus and mother of Emperor Tiberius.	28 September AD 29
	Antonia Minor; Antonia Minor	31 January 36 BC; Athens	AD 41 (posthumous)	Mother of Emperor Claudius.	AD 37; Rome
	Agrippina the Younger; Ivlia Avgvsta Agrippina	7 November AD 15; Oppidum Ubiorum	AD 50	Wife of Emperor Claudius and mother of Emperor Nero	23 March AD 59; Misenum
	Poppaea Sabina; Poppaea Avgvsta Sabina	AD 30; Pompeii	AD 63	Wife of Emperor Nero.	AD 65; Rome
	Claudia Augusta; Clavdia Avgvsta	21 January AD 63; Antium	AD 63	Daughter of Emperor Nero.	April AD 63

=== Flavian dynasty ===
Portrait	Name	Birth	Date of naming	Description	Death
	Domitilla the Younger; Flavia Domitilla Avgvsta	45	Before 80	Daughter of Emperor Vespasian.	66
	Domitia Longina; Domitia Longina Avgvsta	50	80	Wife of Emperor Domitian.	After 120

=== Nerva–Antonine dynasty ===
Portrait	Name	Birth	Date of naming	Description	Death
	Pompeia Plotina; Pompeia Plotina Avgvsta	54–68	105	Wife of Emperor Trajan.	123
	Ulpia Marciana; Vlpia Marciana Avgvsta	48	105	Sister of Emperor Trajan.	112–114
	Salonia Matidia; Salonia Matidia Avgvsta	4 July 68	112	Niece of Emperor Trajan.	23 December 119
	Vibia Sabina; Vibia Sabina Avgvsta	13 August 83	128	Wife of Emperor Hadrian.	136–137
	Faustina the Elder; Annia Galeria Favstina Avgvsta	21 September 100	138	Wife of Emperor Antoninus Pius.	140
	Faustina the Younger; Annia Galeria Favstina Avgvsta Minor	125–130	1 December 147	Daughter of Emperor Antoninus Pius; wife of Emperor Marcus Aurelius; mother of Emperor Commodus.	175
	Lucilla; Annia Avrelia Galeria Lvcilla Avgvsta	148–150	164	Daughter of Emperor Marcus Aurelius and wife of Emperor Lucius Verus.	182
	Bruttia Crispina; Brvttia Crispina Avgvsta	164; Rome	177	Wife of Emperor Commodus.	191; Capri

=== Year of the Five Emperors ===
Portrait	Name	Birth	Date of naming	Description	Death
	Manlia Scantilla; Manlia Scantilla		193	Wife of Emperor Didius Julianus.	193
	Didia Clara; Didia Clara	153; Rome	193	Daughter of Emperor Didius Julianus.	Unknown

=== Severan dynasty ===
Portrait	Name	Birth	Date of naming	Description	Death
	Julia Domna: Ivlia Domna Avgvsta; Ivlia Avgvsta; Ivlia Pia Felix Avgvsta	c. 160		Wife of Emperor Septimius Severus.	217
	Fulvia Plautilla; Pvblia Fvlvia Plavtilla Avgvsta	185—189	210s	Wife of Emperor Caracalla.	212
	Julia Cornelia Paula; Jvlia Cornelia Pavla		219	First wife of Emperor Elagabalus.	
	Aquilia Severa; Ivlia Aqvilia Severa Avgvsta		220	Second and fourth wife of Emperor Elagabalus. As a Vestal Virgin her marriage to the Emperor was very controversial.	
	Julia Avita Mamaea; Ivlia Avita Mamaea Avgvsta	180	222	Mother of Emperor Alexander Severus and co-regent, in his name, during his adolescence.	235
	Sallustia Orbiana; Seia Herennia Sallvstia Barbia Orbiana Avgvsta		225	Wife of Emperor Alexander Severus.	

=== Crisis of the Third Century ===
Portrait	Name	Birth	Date of naming	Description	Death
	Tranquillina; Fvria Sabinia Tranqvillina Avgvsta	c. 225	241	Wife of Emperor Gordian III.	After 244
	Marcia Otacilia Severa; Marcia Otacilia Severa Avgvsta		240s	Wife of the Emperor Philip the Arab.	
	Herennia Etruscilla; Annia Cvpressenia Herennia Etrvscilla Avgvsta	Unknown	September 249	Wife of Emperor Trajan Decius; mother of Emperor Herennius Etruscus and Emperor Hostilian.	c. 253
	Cornelia Supera; Caia Cornelia Svpera Avgvsta		253	Wife of Aemilianus.	
	Cornelia Salonina; Ivlia Cornelia Salonina Avgvsta	Unknown	253	Wife of Emperor Gallienus.	268
	Sulpicia Dryantilla; Svlpicia Dryantilla		c. 260	Wife of usurper Emperor Regalianus, who named her avgvsta as part of legitimizing his claim.	260
	Victoria		271	Mother of Victorinus	271
	Zenobia; Ivlia Avrelia Zenobia	240	272	Queen of the Palmyrene Empire, a short lived splinter empire that revolted during the Crisis. She proclaimed herself avgvsta and annexed the Eastern Mediterranean from Rome.	c. 275
	Ulpia Severina; Vlpia Severina Avgvsta		274	Wife of Emperor Aurelian; possibly reigned in her own right after the death of her husband in 275.	
	Magnia Urbica; Magnia Vrbica Avgvsta		283	Wife of Emperor Carinus.	

== Dominate period ==
=== Tetrarchy ===
Portrait	Name	Birth	Date of naming	Description	Death
	Galeria Valeria; Galeria Valeria Avgvsta		308	Daughter of Emperor Diocletian and wife of Emperor Galerius.	315

=== Constantinian dynasty ===
Portrait	Name	Birth	Date of naming	Description	Death
	Fausta; Flavia Maxima Fausta Avgvsta	289	324	Wife of Constantine I and daughter of Emperor Maximian. Mother of: Constantina, Constantine II, Constantius II, Constans I and Helena.	326
	Helena; Flavia Ivlia Helena Avgvsta	246—250	c.324–325	Mother of Constantine I and ex-wife or mistress of Emperor Constantius Chlorus (separated before his accession as Caesar).	18 August 330
	Constantina; Avgvsta	307—317	After 312, before 337.	Daughter of Emperor Constantine I. Wife of Hannibalianus, Rex Regum et Ponticarum Gentium, "King of Kings and of the Pontic People". Wife of Caesar Constantius Gallus.	354

=== Valentinianic dynasty ===
Portrait	Name	Birth	Date of naming	Description	Death
	Galla Placidia; Galla Placidia Avgvsta	392	c. 416	Daughter of Theodosius I, wife of Constantius III, regent for her son Valentinian III.	27 November 450
	Justa Grata Honoria; Ivsta Grata Honoria Avgvsta		After 426	Sister of Valentinian III.	

=== Theodosian dynasty ===
Portrait	Name	Birth	Date of naming	Description	Death
	Aelia Flaccilla; Aelia Flavia Flaccilla Avgvsta		Before 385	Wife of Emperor Theodosius I.	386
	Eudoxia; Aelia Evdoxia Avgvsta		9 January 400	Wife of Emperor Arcadius.	6 October 404
	Pulcheria; Aelia Pvlcheria Avgvsta	19 January 398–399	414	Daughter of Arcadius, sister of Theodosius II, and then wife of Marcian.	July 453
	Eudocia; Aelia Evdocia Avgvsta	401	2 January 423	Wife of Theodosius II	20 October 460
	Licinia Eudoxia; Licinia Evdoxia Avgvsta	422	439	Daughter of Theodosius II, Wife of Valentinian III.	462

=== Leonid dynasty ===
Portrait	Name	Birth	Date of naming	Description	Death
	Marcia Euphemia; Aelia Marcia Euphemia Avgvsta		c. 453	Daughter of Marcian by an unknown woman. Wife of Anthemius.	472
	Verina; Aelia Verina Avgvsta		457	Wife of Leo I, sister of Basiliscus, mother of Ariadne and Leontia.	484
	Ariadne; Aelia Ariadne Avgvsta	before 457	474	Daughter of Leo I. Wife of Zeno. Mother of Leo II. Wife of Anastasius I.	515
	Zenonis; Aelia Zenonis Avgvsta		475	Wife of Basiliscus.	476–477

== Byzantine period ==
=== Justinian dynasty ===
Portrait	Name	Birth	Date of naming	Description	Death
	Euphemia; Εὐφημία, Euphemia Augusta		518	Wife of Justin I. Originally named Lupicina, renamed Euphemia on her husband's accession.	c.523/4, before 527.
	Theodora I Θεοδώρα, Theodora Augusta	c. 500	9 August 527	Wife of Justinian I.	28 June 548
	Sophia; Σοφία, Aelia Sophia Augusta		568	Wife of Justin II, intermittent regent.	c. 601
	Ino Anastasia; Ἰνὼ Ἀναστασία, Aelia Anastasia Augusta		578	Wife of Emperor Tiberius II.	593
	Constantina; Κωνσταντῖνα	c. 560	582	Wife of Emperor Maurice.	c. 605
	Leontia; Λεοντία		602	Wife of Emperor Phocas.	

=== Heraclian dynasty ===
Portrait	Name	Birth	Date of naming	Description	Death
	Fabia Eudokia, Εύδοκία		5 October 610	First wife of Heraclius.	13 August 612
	Augustina, Αὐγουστίνα		639	Daughter of Heraclius.	
	Martina; Μαρτίνα		639	Second wife of Heraclius, regent of Constantine III and Heraclonas	
	Fausta; Φαύστα	c. 630	642	Wife of Constans II.	After 668

=== Isaurian dynasty ===
Portrait	Name	Birth	Date of naming	Description	Death
	Maria; Μαρία		25 August 718	Wife of Emperor Leo III the Isaurian.	
	Anna; Ἄννα		741–742	Wife of Artabasdos.	
	Eudokia; Ευδοκια		1 April 769	Third wife of Emperor Constantine V.	
	Irene of Athens; Eἰρήνη η Ἀθηναία	c. 752	17 December 769	Wife of Emperor Leo IV the Khazar, empress dowager and regent from 780 to 797.	9 August 803

=== Nikephorian dynasty ===
Portrait	Name	Birth	Date of naming	Description	Death
	Prokopia; Προκοπία	c. 770	12 October 811	Daughter of Emperor Nikephoros I and wife of Michael I Rhangabe.	After 813

=== Amorian dynasty ===
Portrait	Name	Birth	Date of naming	Description	Death
	Theodora II the Armenian; Θεοδώρα	c. 815	830	Wife of Emperor Theophilos and regent of Michael III.	After 867
	Thekla; Θέκλα		830s	Daughter of Theophilos.	
	Anna; Ἄννα		830s	Daughter of Emperor Theophilos.	
	Anastasia; Ἀναστασία		830s	Daughter of Emperor Theophilos.	

=== Macedonian dynasty ===
Portrait	Name	Birth	Date of naming	Description	Death
	Zoe Zaoutzaina; Ζωή Ζαούτζαινα		898	Third wife of Leo VI the Wise	May 899
	Theodora; Θεοδώρα		921	Wife of Romanos I.	20 February 922
	Helena Lekapene; Ἑλένη Λεκαπηνή	c. 910	February 922	Wife of Constantine VII.	19 September 961
	Sophia; Σοφία		February 922	Wife of Christopher Lekapenos.	
	Anna; Ἄννα		933	Daughter of Gabalas and wife of Stephen Lekapenos.	
	Theophano Θεοφανώ	c. 941	c. 956	Wife of Romanos II and Nikephoros II Phokas	a. 978
	Zoe Porphyrogenita	c. 978	1028	Daughter of Constantine VIII Wife of Romanos III Argyros, Michael IV the Paphlagonian and Constantine IX Monomachos	1050
	Theodora Porphyrogenita	c. 980	1042	Daughter of Constantine VII	1056

=== Komnenos dynasty ===
Portrait	Name	Birth	Date of naming	Description	Death
	Catherine of Bulgaria; Αἰκατερίνη	before 1018	1057	Empress-consort of Emperor Isaac I Komnenos.	after 1059

=== Doukid dynasty ===
Portrait	Name	Birth	Date of naming	Description	Death
	Eudokia Makrembolitissa; Ευδοκία Μακρεμβολίτισσα	c. 1021	1059–1067	Second wife of Constantine X Doukas and later wife of Romanos IV Diogenes, also regent of Michael VII Doukas	1096

=== Palaiologos dynasty ===
Portrait	Name	Birth	Date of naming	Description	Death
	Anna of Savoy; Ἄννα	1306	c. 1326	Wife of Andronikos III Palaiologos, mother and regent of John V Palaiologos.	1365
	Helena Dragaš; Ἑλένη Δραγάση	1372	c. 1392	Wife of Manuel II Palaiologos.	1450

== See also ==
- List of Roman and Byzantine empresses
- Augustus (title)
- List of Christian women of the patristic age
