= Battle of Interamna Nahars =

Battle between Emperor Gallus and Aemilianus (253)

- Part of the Crisis of the Third Century
Date	253
Location	Interamna Nahars
Result	Aemilian victory

Belligerents
Aemilianus	Trebonianus Gallus; Volusianus

Commanders and leaders
Aemilianus	Trebonianus Gallus †; Volusianus †

Strength
Unknown	Unknown

Casualties and losses
Unknown	Unknown

The Battle of Interamna Nahars is a conflict that took place in 253 AD. The Roman Emperor Trebonianus Gallus and his son Volusianus were defeated by Marcus Aemilius Aemilianus in a battle near the town of Interamna Nahars on the Flaminian Way. They fled and were murdered by their own guards at Forum Flaminii.
