= Volusianus =

Roman emperor from 251 to 253

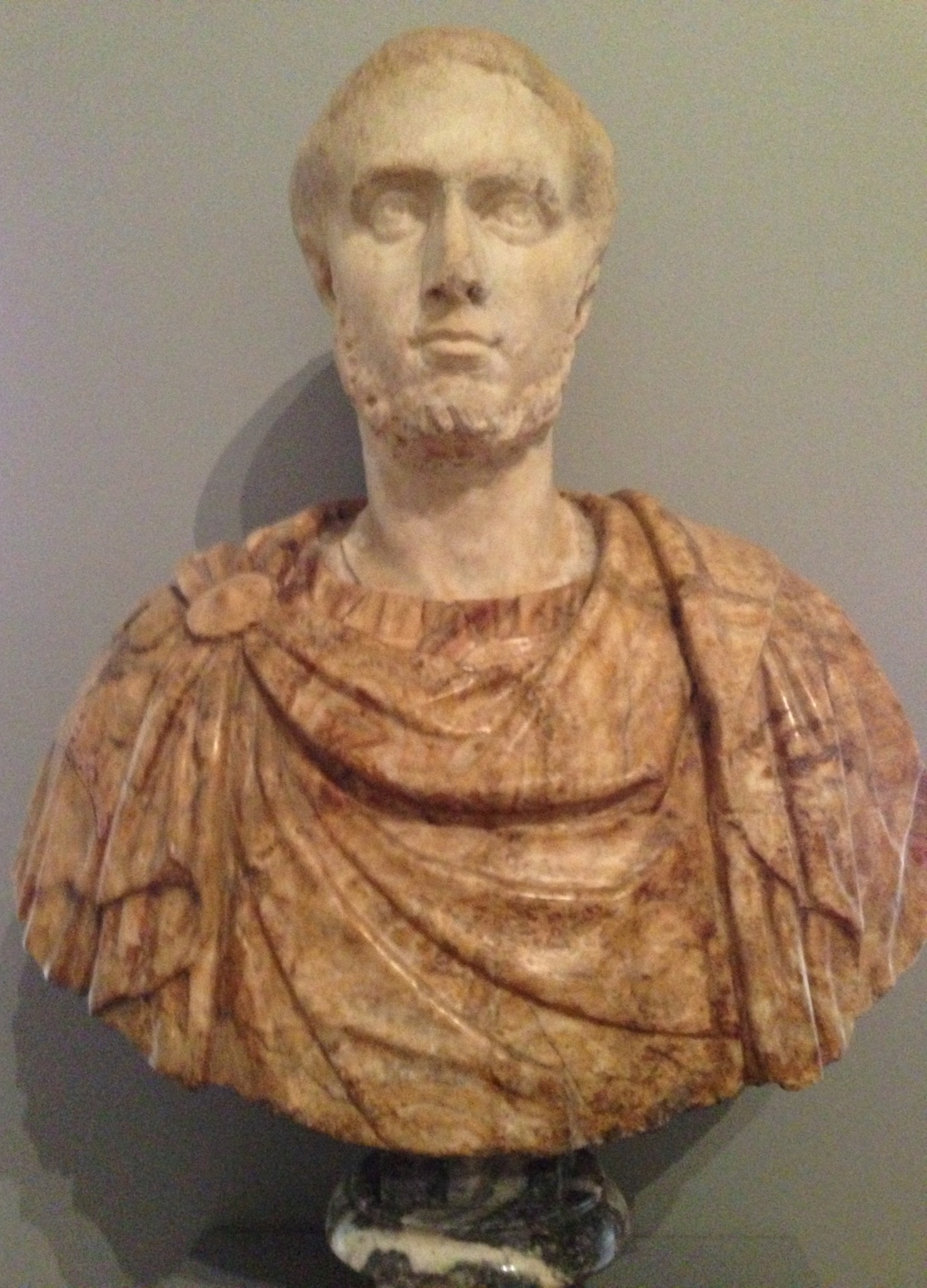
- Possible bust of Volusianus at the Musée des Beaux-Arts de Tours.

Roman emperor
- Reign: c. August 251 – August 253 (with Trebonianus Gallus)
- Predecessor: Decius and Herennius Etruscus
- Successor: Aemilianus
- Died: August 253; Interamna, Italy
Names
- Gaius Vibius Afinius Gallus Veldumnianus Volusianus (birth); Gaius Vibius Volusianus Caesar (251)
Regnal name
- Imperator Caesar Gaius Vibius Afinius Gallus Veldumnianus Volusianus Augustus
- Father: Trebonianus Gallus
- Mother: Afinia Gemina Baebiana

Volusianus (Latin: Gaius Vibius Afinius Gallus Veldumnianus Volusianus; died August 253), commonly called Volusian, was a Roman emperor from 251 to 253, ruling alongside his father Trebonianus Gallus.

After Emperor Decius and his son and co-ruler Herennius Etruscus died in battle in June 251, Trebonianus Gallus was elected emperor in the field by the legion. Gallus raised Hostilian, the younger son of Decius, to augustus (co-emperor) and elevated Volusianus to caesar. After the death of Hostilian in July or August 251, Volusianus was raised to augustus. The short reign of Gallus and Volusianus was notable for the outbreak of a plague, which is said by some to be the reason for Hostilian's death, and for hostilities with the Sasanian Empire and the Goths. Volusianus and his father were killed in August 253 by their own soldiers, who were terrified of the forces of the usurper Aemilian which were marching towards Rome.

== History ==
Volusianus was the son of Trebonianus Gallus, who was named emperor in July 251 after his predecessors, Decius and Herennius Etruscus, died fighting the Goths at the Battle of Abritus. Elected by the troops in the field, Gallus signed a treaty, decried by contemporary historians as "shameful", which promised tribute to the Goths if they abstained from raiding. He subsequently made a bid for popularity by declaring Hostilian, the surviving son of Decius, augustus (emperor) with him, voluntarily sharing his power with the prior imperial family. Later, still in July 251, Gallus elevated Volusianus to caesar (heir-apparent). Volusianus was wed to Hostilian's sister, of an unknown name.

Hostilian died in July or August 251. The reason for his death is disputed: Aurelius Victor and the author of the Epitome de Caesaribus both say that Hostilian died of a plague, but Zosimus claims that Trebonianus Gallus murdered the young augustus so that Volusianus could take his place. Regardless of circumstances, Volusianus subsequently received the rank of augustus. He was made consul in 252, alongside Trebonianus Gallus, and in 253, alongside Valerius Maximus. The same plague that killed Hostilian devastated the rest of Rome, although Trebonianus Gallus gained much popularity by ensuring that all of the plague victims were given proper burials, regardless of their social status. During the reign of Trebonianus Gallus and Volusianus, the persecution of Christians was not as extreme as it was under Decius, although Pope Cornelius was exiled in 252 AD. Novatian was also forced to flee Rome during this period of persecution. Trebonianus Gallus and Volusianus issued only two imperial rescripts during their reign.

During the shared reign of Trebonianus Gallus and Volusianus, the Roman Empire was invaded by both the Goths and the Sassanids. Both co-emperors chose to stay in Rome rather than confront the invasions themselves. The Sassanids attacked in 252, quickly overrunning Mesopotamia, and defeated the Romans at the Battle of Barbalissos, near Barbalissos in the province of Euphratensis (modern day Syria). They advanced into Roman territory as far as Antioch, which was captured in 253 after a prolonged siege. In 253, the Goths invaded Moesia Inferior, as the new governor, Aemilian, had refused to pay the tribute to them. The Goths split into two bands, with one raiding the cities of Moesia Inferior and Thracia, and the other crossing into Asia Minor as far as Ephesus.

Aemilian succeeded in repelling the Goths, slaughtering many and forcing the rest back across the Danube. The prestige of this victory was so great that Aemilian's soldiers spontaneously declared him emperor, in opposition to Trebonianus Gallus and Volusianus. When the news reached Rome, Gallus and Volusianus called for reinforcements from Valerian, the future emperor, who had been strengthening the empire's defences on the Rhine. Aemilian marched to Italy at a rapid pace, arriving before Valerian could such send any assistance. The troops available to the co-emperors feared fighting the much stronger forces of Aemilian. To forestall the battle, they mutinied, killing Gallus and Volusianus at Interamna, in Umbria, in August 253. The Chronography of 354 says the co-emperors ruled for a total of two years, four months, and nine days.

== Numismatics ==
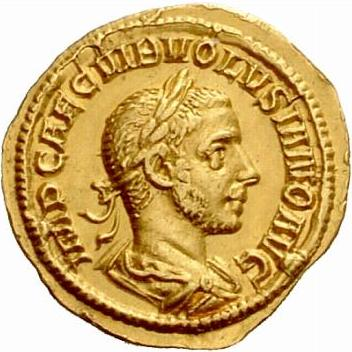
Coin featuring Volusianus

The aurei of Volusianus fell into two types. There were five styles of coins which featured his bust on the obverse, with the reverse showing: Aequitas sitting, Aeternitas standing, Apollo standing, Juno sitting inside a rounded temple, or Victoria standing. There were a further six styles of coins which featured his bust with a Radiate on the obverse, with the reverse displaying: Concordia sitting, Felicitas standing, Libertas standing, Providence standing, Salus standing, or a helmeted Virtus standing. The coins of Volusianus occasionally bore the inscription Saeculum nouum (new age), alongside the traditional inscriptions Romae aeternae (eternal Rome) and Pax aeternae (eternal peace).

== Family tree ==
previous Decius; Roman Emperor; 249-251 ∞ Herennia Etruscilla	Trebonianus Gallus; Roman Emperor; 251-253 ∞ Afinia Gemina Baebiana	next Aemilianus; Roman Emperor; 253 ∞ Cornelia Supera
Herennius Etruscus co-emperor	Volusianus co-emperor 251-253

== See also ==
- List of Roman emperors

Regnal titles
Preceded by Hostilian	Roman Emperor; 251–253; With: Trebonianus Gallus	Succeeded by Aemilian
Political offices
Preceded by Decius, Herennius Etruscus	Roman consul 252–253 with Trebonianus Gallus, L. Valerius Poplicola Balbinus Maximus	Succeeded by Valerian, Gallienus
