= Herennia Etruscilla =

Roman empress from 249 to 251

- Augusta
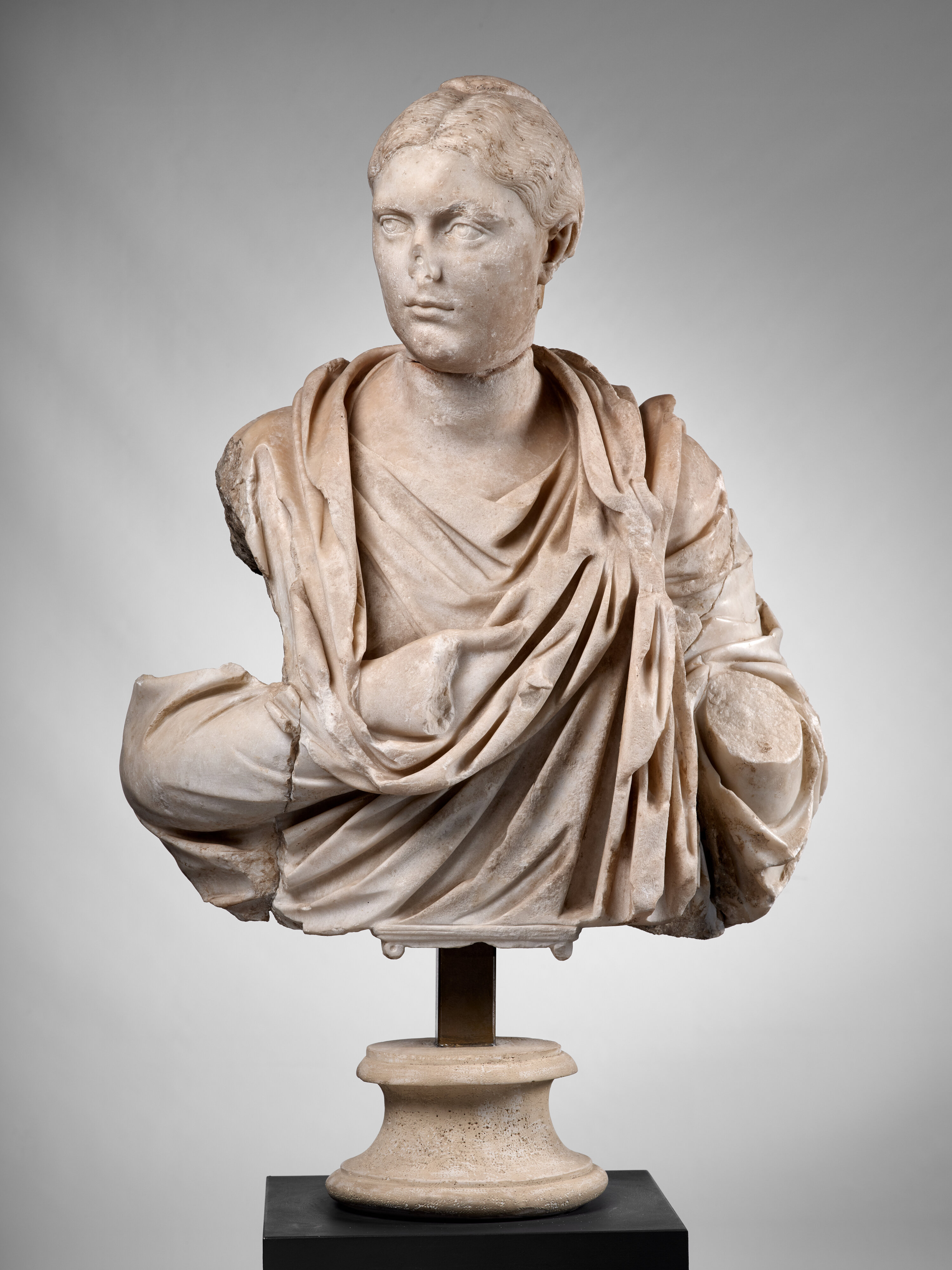
- Bust of Herennia Etruscilla.

Empress of the Roman Empire
- Tenure: 249–c 253
- Born: Unknown
- Died: c. 253
- Spouse: Decius
- Issue: Herennius Etruscus; Hostilian
Names
- Herennia Cupressenia Etruscilla
Regnal name
- Herennia Cupressenia Etruscilla Augusta

Herennia Cupressenia Etruscilla was Roman empress as the wife of Emperor Decius. She was the mother of Emperors Herennius Etruscus and Hostilian.

== Life ==
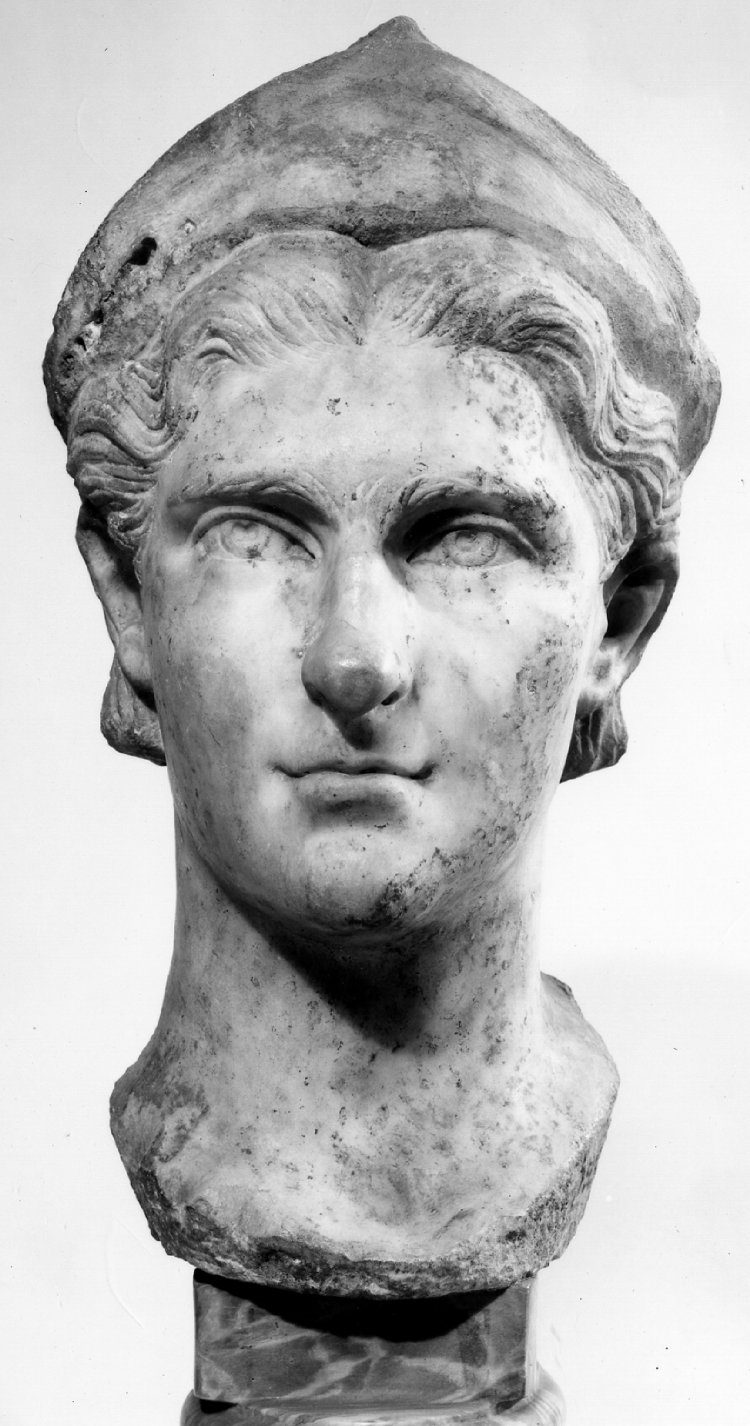
Possible marble statue of Herennia Etruscilla.

As with most third-century Roman empresses, very little is known about her. The date and place of her birth are not known for certain. She was probably from a senatorial family of Herennia gens. It is assumed that her ancestors settled in Etrurian lands. Herennia married Decius probably before 230, therefore, Herennia was born in early 3rd century AD. She gained the title Augusta when Decius became emperor in 249 AD. After the death of both Decius and Herennius Etruscus in the Battle of Abritus, Trebonianus Gallus, the governor of Moesia, was elected as emperor in June 251 AD.

In order to gain popular support, Trebonianus Gallus retained Herennia Etruscilla as Augusta (empress-mother) and elevated Hostilian to Augustus, making him co-emperor alongside Trebonianus Gallus himself. Hostilian died in July 251, either from a plague or murder, after which Trebonianus Gallus' son Volusianus, was raised to Augustus. In November 251 AD, Herennia survived the epidemic, in which her son Hostilian died, retained the role of Augusta, despite any familial ties to Gallus and lived until 253 AD, corresponding to the end of his reign.

== Numismatics ==
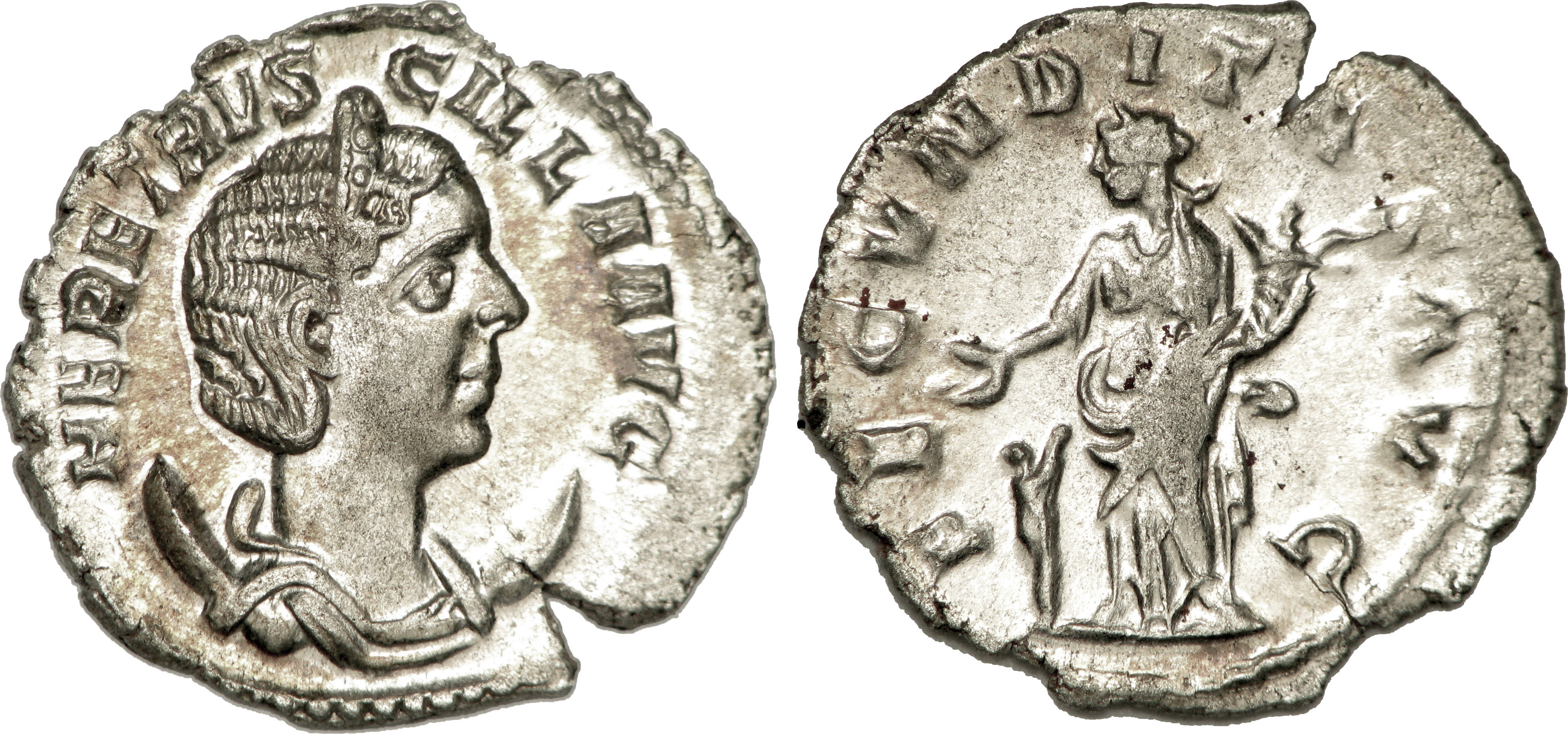
Antoninianus of Herennia Etruscilla. Inscription: HER ETRVSCILLA AVG / FECVNDITAS AVG; 251 AD.

While information about her is scarce, coins with her portrait are numerous and easy to obtain. Legends on coins struck at Rome only ever give her name as 'Herennia Etruscilla' but billon tetradrachms struck at Alexandria supply the Cupressenia element in abbreviation: ΕΡ ΚΟΥΠ ΑΙΤΡΟΥCΚΙΛΑ (Greek: Her. Koup. Aitrouskila), showing that her full name was Herennia Cup(ressenia) Etruscilla. The Cupressenia element is expanded from the 'ΚΟΥΠ' in the Alexandria coin legends, from the Latin cupresseus "cypress tree" and symbol of Juno.

== See also ==
- Women in ancient Rome
- List of Roman women

== Sources ==
- Adkins, Lesley; Adkins, Roy A. (1998). Handbook to Life in Ancient Rome. New York: Oxford University Press. ISBN 9780195123326.
- Bunson, Matthew (2014). Encyclopedia of the Roman Empire. New York: Facts On File. ISBN 9781438110271.
- Joseph Hilarius Eckhel, Doctrina Numorum Veterum (The Study of Ancient Coins).
- Francesco Scipione, Marchese di Maffei, Museum Veronense, hoc est, Antiquarum Inscriptionum atque Anaglyphorum Collectio (Museum of Verona, or a Collection of Antique Inscriptions and Reliefs).
- Ludovico Antonio Muratori, Novus Thesaurus Veterum Inscriptionum (New Treasury of Ancient Inscriptions), Milan (1739-42).
- Salisbury, F. S.; Mattingly, H. (1924). "The Reign of Trajan Decius". The Journal of Roman Studies. 14 (1–2): 1–23. doi:10.2307/296323. JSTOR 296323. S2CID 163083500.

Royal titles
Preceded by Marcia Otacilia Severa	Empress of Rome; 249–251	Succeeded by Afinia Gemina Baebiana?
Preceded by Marcia Otacilia Severa	Empress of Rome; 249–251	Succeeded by Cornelia Supera
Preceded by Nonia Celsa	Empress-Mother of Rome; 251	Succeeded by Cornelia Salonina
