= Herennia gens =

Ancient Roman family

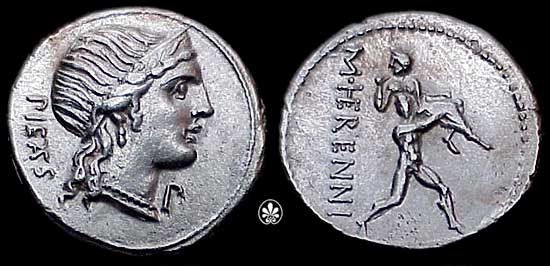
Coin of Marcus Herennius. The obverse features the goddess Pietas, while the reverse depicts Amphinomus carrying his father to safety from the eruption of Mount Aetna. (Note: From the Tale of the Two Brothers of Catana, or Pii Fratres, who were regarded as the model of filial piety. Amphinomus carried his father; Anapias (not pictured) carried his mother. They refused to abandon their parents even when it seemed that the lava was about to overtake them due to their burden; but miraculously the lava parted and they were saved. Many copies of this coin still exist.)

The gens Herennia was a plebeian family at ancient Rome. Members of this gens are first mentioned among the Italian nobility during the Samnite Wars, and they appear in the Roman consular list beginning in 93 BC. In Imperial times they held a number of provincial offices and military commands. The empress Herennia Etruscilla was a descendant of this gens.

The extensive mercantile interests of the Herennii are attested by several authors, who describe the family's participation in the Sicilian and African trade, and especially their involvement in purchasing and exporting silphium, a medicinal herb of great value in antiquity, which grew only along a short stretch of the African coast, and defied all attempts to cultivate it. (Note: For uncertain reasons, silphium disappeared by the reign of Nero, who is said to have received the last stalk of it as a curiosity; factors in its disappearance probably included overharvesting and a brief fashion for animals fed upon it. The identity of silphium has never been satisfactorily established, although it is depicted on a number of coins from Cyrene; it is generally supposed to have been a variety of Ferula, possibly extinct, but perhaps identical with still extant species, such as Ferula tingitana. These plants resemble depictions of silphium, and share some of the medicinal properties that were ascribed to it.) The Herennian interest in trade is attested by the surname Siculus (a Sicilian), the settlement of a merchant named "Herennius" at Leptis Magna, the legend of the founding of a temple to Hercules at Rome, and a coin of the gens bearing a representation of the goddess Pietas on the obverse, and on the reverse Amphinomus carrying his father, a reference to the legend of the two brothers of Catana, who escaped an eruption of Mount Aetna carrying their aged parents.

== Origin ==
The Herennii were originally Samnites from Campania, but they were absorbed into the Roman state following the Samnite Wars. The nomen Herennius appears to be a patronymic surname, as Herennius was an Oscan praenomen. The Marii were their hereditary clientes. Livy mentions a Herennius who was one of the leading members of the senate of Nola in Campania, and many of the Herennii remained in this region of Italy; a Marcus Herennius was decurion of Pompeii about 63 BC. The Herennii preserved a Sabellic custom by assuming matronymic and occasionally gamonymic (Note: derived from the individual name of the husband, and typical in Etruscan naming practices)) surnames, the arrangement of which could vary considerably. Livy records an example of this in connection with the panic over the discovery of the Bacchanalia at Rome in 186 BC: Minius Cerrinius was the son of a Cerrinius and Minia Paculla; (Note: Livy refers to her as Paculla Annia.) after marrying Herennia, he became Herennius Cerrinius. Herennius Etruscus Messius Decius was the son of the emperor Decius and Herennia Etruscilla.

== Praenomina ==
The Herennii of the Republic favoured the praenomina Gaius, Marcus, and Lucius, the three most common names throughout Roman history. At least one was named Titus, also among the most common praenomina.

== Branches and cognomina ==
In the time of the Republic, the cognomina found for the Herennii include Balbus, Bassus, Cerrinius, Pontius, and Siculus. Many other surnames occur in Imperial times. Balbus and Bassus were common surnames, the former originally referring to one who stammers, and the latter to one inclined to stoutness. Cerrinius and Pontius were Samnite nomina, the latter perhaps cognate with the Latin Quinctius. Siculus refers to an inhabitant of Sicily, where some of the Herennii carried on their trade. Picens, attributed to the consul of 34 BC, would, if accurate, suggest that a branch of the Herennii had settled in Picenum.

== Members ==
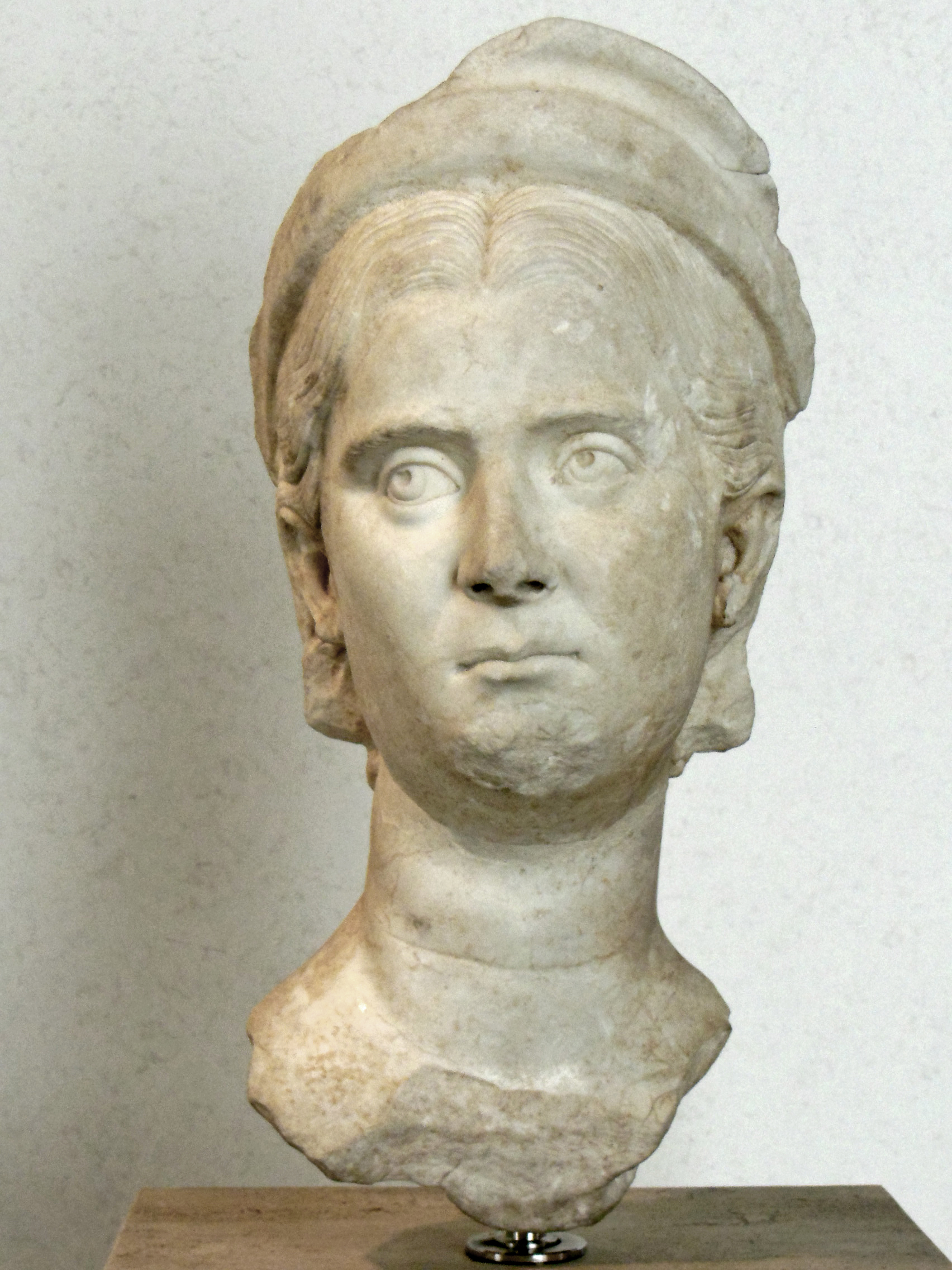
Bust of the empress Herennia Etruscilla, from the National Roman Museum of Palazzo Massimo, Rome.

This list includes abbreviated praenomina. For an explanation of this practice, see filiation.

- Gaius Herennius, according to some sources one of the commissioners for assigning land to the colony at Placentia in 218 BC. He and his colleagues were obliged to seek refuge at Mutina following an insurrection of the Boii, but according to Polybius they were captured by the Gauls.
- Herennius Bassus, one of the leading senators at Nola in 215 BC, during the Second Punic War. In answer to the embassy of Hannibal urging the town to desert the Roman cause, Bassus said that the city was satisfied with its alliance with Rome, and had no desire to change sides.
- Herennius Cerrinius, (Note: Born Minius Cerrinius; he apparently assumed the nomen Herennius as a gamonymic surname following his marriage to a Herennia.) a priest who officiated at the Bacchanalia held at Rome in 186 BC, having been initiated into the rites by his mother, Minia Paculla. The exposure of the rites and rumours about the immoral behaviour of participants caused a general panic at Rome, and they were brutally suppressed, in the course of which Cerrinius probably perished.
- Marcus Octavius Herennius, according to legend, a flute-player who became a successful trader. He dedicated a tenth of his gains to Hercules, and after successfully fending off an attack by pirates, the god appeared to him in a dream, stating that he had given Herennius the strength. In gratitude, Herennius built a chapel to Hercules at the foot of the Aventine Hill, near the Porta Trigemina.
- Herennius Siculus, a haruspex, and a friend of Gaius Sempronius Gracchus, was arrested because of his association with Gracchus; but rather than face the dishonour of imprisonment in the Tullianum, he bashed his head against the doorpost, and so expired.
- Gaius Herennius, the patron of Gaius Marius, who was summoned to testify against Marius on a charge of bribery. Herennius refused, on the grounds that it would be unlawful for a patron to do injury to his client. He probably lived near Arpinum.
- Marcus Herennius, consul in 93 BC, who won election against the noted orator Lucius Marcius Philippus, despite his own humble birth and limited oratorical skill. Large amounts of the expensive medicinal herb silphium reached Rome during his consulship, probably due to the trading connections of the Herennii.
- Gaius Herennius, tribune of the plebs in 80 BC, opposed Sulla's proposal to recall Gnaeus Pompeius from Africa. He was probably the same person as the legate Herennius who later served under Sertorius in Hispania; he was defeated and slain by Pompeius near Valentia. He may also be the same as the senator Gaius Herennius, convicted of peculatio at some point before 69.
- Titus Herennius, a banker at Leptis Magna, whom Verres had put to death during his praetorship, despite more than one hundred Roman citizens at Syracuse who attested to his good character and innocence of any crime.
- Gaius Herennius, the addressee of a treatise on rhetoric attributed to Cicero; he does not seem to be identified with any of the other men of this name.
- Marcus Herennius, a decurion at Pompeii in 63 BC, he was struck and killed by lightning out of a cloudless sky. Under augural law, this constituted a prodigy, and the event was later viewed as foreshadowing the treason of Catiline.
- Sextus Herennius, father of the tribune.
- Gaius Herennius Sex. f., tribune of the plebs in 59 BC, lent considerable support to Publius Clodius Pulcher, when he illegally procured his adoption into a plebeian gens, in order to obtain the tribunician power.
- Lucius Herennius Balbus, assisted Lucius Sempronius Atratinus in the prosecution of Marcus Caelius Rufus for vis in 56 BC. Cicero, who was a friend of all three men, successfully defended Caelius in his oration Pro Caelio, in which he asserted that Herennius and Sempronius were being exploited by Clodia, Caelius' former lover, and the sister of Cicero's enemy, Publius Clodius Pulcher. (Note: Sempronius was easily persuaded to prosecute Caelius, who earlier that year had prosecuted Lucius Calpurnius Bestia, supposed by some to have been Sempronius' biological father, on a charge of ambitus (bribery). Clodia, meanwhile, is traditionally identified with Lesbia, the lover of Catullus, whose attributes accord somewhat with Cicero's description of Clodia in Pro Caelio.)
- Lucius Herennius Balbus, perhaps the same person as the friend of Cicero, demanded that the slaves belonging to Titus Annius Milo and his wife, Fausta, be tortured in order to obtain evidence concerning the death of Publius Claudius Pulcher.
- Herennius Gallus, an actor at Gades, whom Lucius Cornelius Balbus raised to the rank of an eques, presenting him with a gold ring, and seating him in the part of the theatre that was reserved for the equites.
- Herennius, a young man expelled from the army by Augustus on account of his profligate habits. Macrobius relates two anecdotes concerning their conversations. (Note: "When the order was issued, [Herennius] asked, 'How shall I present myself at home? What can I say to my father?' 'Tell him,' replied Augustus, 'that you did not like me.' Herennius had been scarred on the forehead by a stone, and boasted of it as an honourable wound. But Augustus counselled him: 'Herennius, next time you run away, do not look behind you.' ")
- Marcus Herennius, father of the consul of 34 BC.
- Marcus Herennius M. f. Picens, consul suffectus in November and December, 34 BC.
- Marcus Herennius M. f. M. n. Picens, consul suffectus in AD 1.
- Herennius Capito, procurator of Iamnia during the reign of Tiberius, arrested Herod Agrippa for a debt owed to the Imperial treasury, and reported on Herod's conduct when the young man escaped.
- Herennius Senecio, quaestor in his native province of Hispania Baetica, was accused by Metius Carus of having sought no public office after the quaestorship, and having written the Life of Helvidius Priscus, who had been put to death by Vespasian. On these apparently slight grounds, the emperor Domitian had Herennius executed.
- Herennius Pollio, an orator in the time of Pliny the Younger, might be the same as either Publius or Marcus, consuls in AD 85.
- Publius Herennius Pollio, consul suffectus alongside his son, Marcus, in July and August of AD 85.
- Marcus Annius Herennius P. f. Pollio, consul suffectus together with his father, Publius, in July and August, AD 85.
- Herennius Severus, a friend of Pliny the Younger, who describes him as a vir doctissimus, "a most learned man".
- Lucius Herennius Saturninus, consul suffectus in AD 100.
- Marcus Herennius Pollio, consul suffectus before AD 103.
- Herennius Severus, consul suffectus in a nundinium between the years 118 and 138.
- Gaius Herennius Capella, consul suffectus in AD 119.
- Marcus Herennius Faustus, consul suffectus in AD 121.
- Marcus Herennius Secundus, consul suffectus in AD 183.
- Herennius Modestinus, a celebrated jurist of the third century AD; he was a pupil of Ulpian, and considered one of the great jurists in the classical period of Roman law.
- Herennia Cupressenia Etruscilla, wife of the emperor Decius, and Roman empress from AD 249 to 251. She is not mentioned by the historians, but is known from coins and inscriptions bearing her name and likeness.
- Quintus Herennius Etruscus Messius Decius, son of the emperor Decius, was appointed consul in AD 251, and subsequently elevated to the rank of Augustus, becoming emperor together with his father; but both father and son were slain in battle against the Goths in Thrace before the end of the year.

== See also ==
- List of Roman gentes

== Bibliography ==
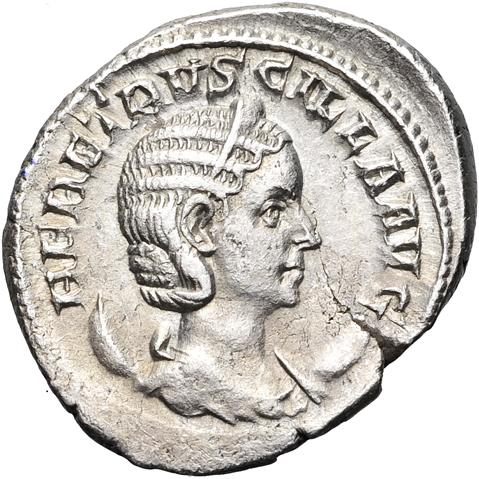
Silver Antoninianus of the empress Herennia Etruscilla.

- Polybius, Historiae.
- Marcus Tullius Cicero, Brutus, Epistulae ad Atticum, In Verrem, Pro Murena, Rhetorica ad Herennium (attributed), Pro Caelio, Epistulae ad Familiares.
- Gaius Sallustius Crispus (Sallust), Historiae.
- Titus Livius (Livy), History of Rome.
- Dionysius of Halicarnassus, Romaike Archaiologia (Roman Antiquities).
- Valerius Maximus, Factorum ac Dictorum Memorabilium (Memorable Facts and Sayings).
- Quintus Asconius Pedianus, Commentarius in Oratio Ciceronis Pro Milone (Commentary on Cicero's Oration Pro Milone).
- Gaius Plinius Secundus (Pliny the Elder), Naturalis Historia (Natural History).
- Gaius Plinius Caecilius Secundus (Pliny the Younger), Epistulae.
- Appianus Alexandrinus (Appian), Bellum Samniticum (History of the Samnite Wars).
- Lucius Mestrius Plutarchus (Plutarch), Lives of the Noble Greeks and Romans.
- Flavius Josephus, Antiquitates Judaicae (Antiquities of the Jews).
- Publius Cornelius Tacitus, Historiae, De Vita et Moribus Iulii Agricolae (On the Life and Mores of Julius Agricola).
- Lucius Cassius Dio Cocceianus (Cassius Dio), Roman History.
- Julius Obsequens, Liber de Prodigiis (The Book of Prodigies).
- Sextus Aurelius Victor, De Caesaribus (On the Caesars), Epitome de Caesaribus (Extracts of On the Caesars, attributed).
- Servius, Ad Virgilii Aeneidem commentarii (Commentary on Vergil's Aeneid).
- Claudius Claudianus (Claudian), Carmina Minora (Lesser Poems).
- Ambrosius Theodosius Macrobius, Saturnalia.
- Joannes Zonaras, Epitome Historiarum (Extracts of History).
- Ludovico Antonio Muratori, Novus Thesaurus Veterum Inscriptionum (New Treasury of Ancient Inscriptions), Milan (1739-42).
- Francesco Scipione, Marchese di Maffei, Museum Veronense, hoc est, Antiquarum Inscriptionum atque Anaglyphorum Collectio (Museum of Verona, or a Collection of Antique Inscriptions and Reliefs).
- Joseph Hilarius Eckhel, Doctrina Numorum Veterum (The Study of Ancient Coins).
- Dictionary of Greek and Roman Biography and Mythology, William Smith, ed., Little, Brown and Company, Boston (1849).
- George Davis Chase, "The Origin of Roman Praenomina", in Harvard Studies in Classical Philology, vol. VIII (1897).
- T. Robert S. Broughton, The Magistrates of the Roman Republic, American Philological Association (1952–1986).
- E. Mary Smallwood, Documents Illustrating the Principates of Nerva, Trajan, and Hadrian, Cambridge University Press (1966).
- Paul A. Gallivan, "The Fasti for A.D. 70–96", in Classical Quarterly, vol. 31, pp. 186–220 (1981).
- Olli Salomies, Adoptive and Polyonymous Nomenclature in the Roman Empire, Societas Scientiarum Fennica, Helsinki (1992).
- John C. Traupman, The New College Latin & English Dictionary (Bantam, 1995).
- Werner Eck and Andreas Pangerl, "Neue Diplome mit den Namen von Konsuln und Statthaltern," in Zeitschrift für Papyrologie und Epigraphik, vol. 187 (2013).
