= Cornelia Supera =

Roman empress in 253

- Augusta
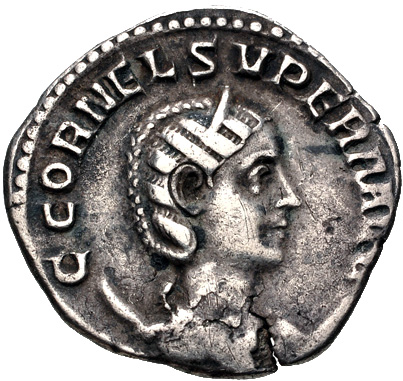
- Antoninianus of Cornelia Supera

Empress of the Roman Empire
- Tenure: 253
- Died: After 253
- Spouse: Aemilian
Regnal name
- Gaia Cornelia Supera Augusta

Gaia Cornelia Supera (died after 253 AD) was the empress of Rome and the wife of Emperor Aemilian.

Nothing is known about her life, except from numismatic evidence. Her full name on the coins is C[AIA] CORNEL[IA] SVPERA AVG[VSTA], or alternatively CORNEL[IA] SVPERA AVG[VSTA] or COR[NELIA] SVPERA AV[GVSTA]. Her coins are extremely rare. Her name and monuments were condemned after Valerian was hailed as emperor in October of 253.

Royal titles
Preceded by Afinia Gemina Baebiana?	Empress of Rome; 253	Succeeded by Cornelia Salonina
Preceded by Herennia Etruscilla	Empress of Rome; 253	Succeeded by Cornelia Salonina
