= Herennius Etruscus =

Roman emperor in 251

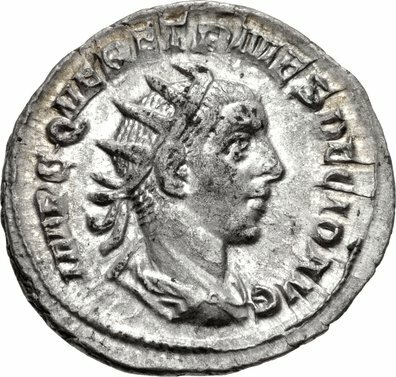
- Antoninianus of Etruscus as emperor. Legend: imp c q her etr mes decio aug.

Roman emperor
- Reign: May–June 251
- Predecessor: Philip the Arab
- Successor: Trebonianus Gallus
- Co-emperor: Decius
- Died: c. June 251; Abritus, Moesia Inferior
Names
- Quintus Herennius Etruscus Messius Decius
Regnal name
- Imperator Caesar Quintus Herennius Etruscus Messius Decius Augustus
- Father: Decius
- Mother: Herennia Etruscilla

Herennius Etruscus (Latin: Quintus Herennius Etruscus Messius Decius; died c. June 251) was briefly Roman emperor in 251, ruling jointly under his father Decius. His father was proclaimed emperor by his troops in September 249 while in Pannonia and Moesia, in opposition to Philip. Decius defeated Philip in battle, and was then proclaimed emperor by the Senate. Etruscus, still a child, was elevated to Caesar (heir) in 250, then further raised to Augustus (emperor) in May 251.

When the Goths, under Cniva, invaded the Danubian provinces, he was sent with a vanguard, followed by the main body of Roman troops, led by Decius. They ambushed Cniva at the Battle of Nicopolis ad Istrum in 250, routing him, before being ambushed and routed themselves at the Battle of Beroe. Etruscus was killed in the Battle of Abritus the following year, alongside his father. After the deaths of both emperors, Trebonianus Gallus, who had been governor of Moesia, was elected emperor by the remaining Roman forces.

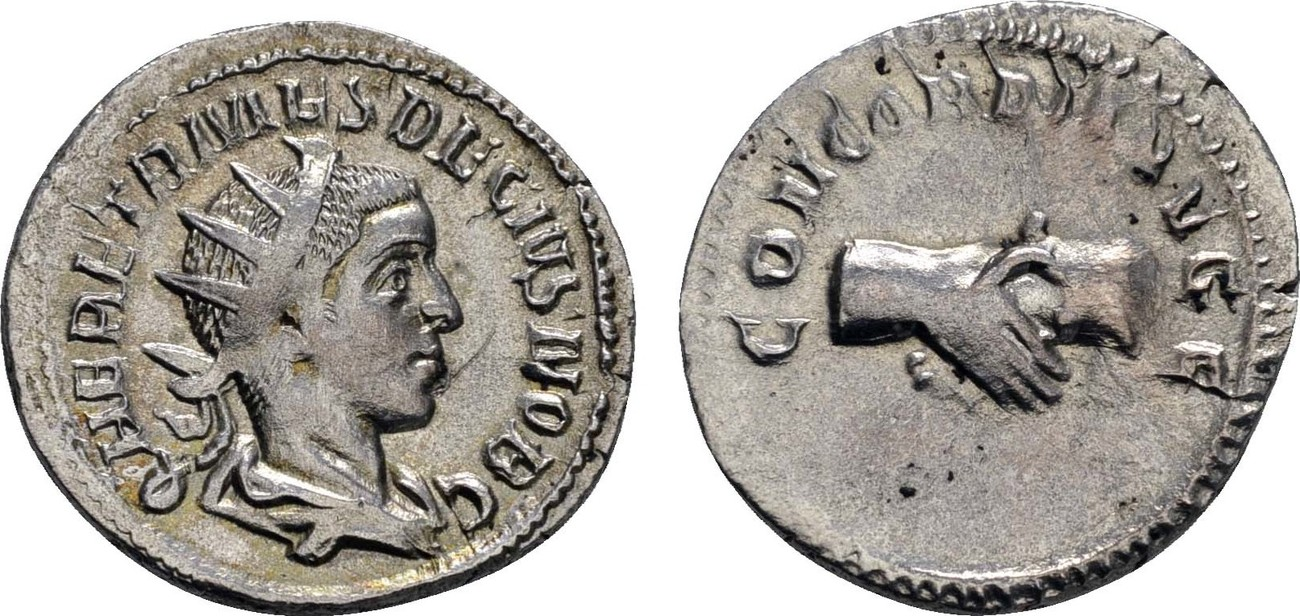
Antoninianus of Etruscus as Caesar, AD 250. Legend: HER. ETR. MES. DECIVS NOB C / CONCORDIA AUGG

== Life ==
Quintus Herennius Etruscus Messius Decius was the son of Decius, a Roman general who later became emperor, and Herennia Etruscilla, his wife. His birth date is sometimes given between 220 and 230, but there is no way to confirm this. Etruscus was probably a young boy when he was proclaimed emperor in 251, as depicted in his coins.

Decius became emperor after being sent to lead troops in the provinces of Pannonia and Moesia, where he was declared emperor by his troops in September 249, in opposition to Philip the Arab. He led his troops against Philip, their forces meeting in September 249, near Verona, Italy. In this battle, Philip was slain, after which the Roman Senate declared Decius emperor, and honored him with the name Traianus, a reference to Emperor Trajan.

Both Herennius Etruscus and his younger brother Hostilian were elevated to caesars in 250, and in May 251 Herennius Etruscus was elevated to Augustus, making him co-emperor under Decius. He was also made consul for 251.

The Gothic invasion led by Cniva.

In 249, the Goths, led by King Cniva, invaded the Danubian provinces of the Roman Empire with a huge force. They split into two columns; one column launched an assault on Dacia, and the other force, made up of 70,000 men, and personally led by Cniva, invaded Moesia. Cniva's forces further split into two groups; one marched to assault Philippopolis, and the other marched to Novae. Cniva was prevented from laying siege to Novae by Trebonianus Gallus, the governor of Moesia and future emperor, and thus moved south, on to Nicopolis. By this time news of the invasion reached Rome, and both Decius and Herennius Etruscus traveled to repulse the Gothic invasion, although Hostilian remained in Rome. Herennius Etruscus was sent forward with a vanguard, followed by the main body of Roman forces, led by Decius. Decius and Herennius Etruscus took the Gothic forces by surprise in the Battle of Nicopolis, and beat them decisively. Following the crushing defeat, Cniva retreated over the Haemus Mons (Balkan Mountains), and met up with his other forces at Philippopolis. Cniva then ambushed the forces of Decius and Herennius Etruscus at the Battle of Beroe, near the small town of Beroca at the base of the Haemus Mons. The Roman forces were beaten decisively in this engagement and fled in disarray to Moesia where Decius and Herennius Etruscus worked to reorganize them. Cniva then returned to Philippopolis, and with the help of Titus Julius Priscus, the Roman governor of Thrace, managed to capture the city.

Decius and Herennius Etruscus launched a counterattack in spring 251 and were initially successful in pushing back the Goths. However, Cniva set an ambush for them, in June 251, near Abritus (modern-day Razgrad, Bulgaria). In this battle, both Decius and Herennius Etruscus were killed. The exact circumstances of the death of Herennius Etruscus are vague. The main source for the event, Aurelius Victor, says only that Herennius Etruscus was killed when he "pressed the attack too boldly". Aurelius Victor specifies that he was acting as an imperator, commanding troops from a distance but not physically engaging in the combat, rather than a commilito, who physically fought in the battle. After the news of his death reached Decius, he refused to be consoled, stating that the loss of one life was minor to a battle, and thus continued the combat, in which he was also slain. The death of Decius is similarly obscure, although it is agreed upon that he must have died either during the battle, as a commilito, during the retreat from the battle, or else was slain while serving as imperator. The reserve forces of Trebonianus Gallus failed to reinforce the main army in time to save Decius and Herennius Etruscus, although whether this was due to treachery or misfortune is unknown.

After the death of both Decius and Herennius Etruscus, and much of the Roman army with them, the remaining forces immediately elected Trebonianus Gallus, the governor of Moesia, as emperor. Trebonianus Gallus made peace with Cniva on humiliating terms, allowing them to keep their prisoners and spoils in order to secure peace. In order to gain popular support, Trebonianus Gallus retained Herennia Etruscilla as Augusta (empress), and elevated Hostilian to Augustus, making him co-emperor alongside Trebonianus Gallus himself. Hostilian died in November 251, either from a plague or murder, after which Volusianus, Trebonianus Gallus' son, was raised to Augustus. After Trebonianus Gallus was overthrown by Aemilianus in 253, Herennia Etruscilla faded into obscurity.

Regnal titles
Preceded by Philip the Arab	Roman Emperor; 251; Served alongside: Decius	Succeeded by Trebonianus Gallus; Hostilian
Political offices
Preceded by Decius, Vettius Gratus	Roman emperor 251 with Decius	Succeeded by Trebonianus Gallus, Volusianus
