= Siege of Nisibis (252) =

Conflict during Roman-Sassanid Wars (252)

- Part of Shapur I's second Roman campaign
Date	252 AD
Location	Nisibis (modern-day Nusaybin, Mardin, Turkey)
Result	Sasanian victory
Territorial changes	Sasanians capture Nisibis.

Belligerents
Roman Empire	Sasanian Empire

Commanders and leaders
Unknown	Shapur I

Strength
2,000–5,000 Legionaries	Unknown

The siege of Nisibis took place when the Sasanians under Shah Shapur I besieged the Roman city of Nisibis in 252. This marks the beginning of Shapur's I second invasion of the Roman empire which saw the first Sassanid invasion of Syria; the year of the invasion is debated as Shapur's inscription from Naqsh-e Rustam regarding his second campaign against Rome do not mention the city of Nisibis. But Syriac and Arabic sources, mainly the Chronicle of Seert and Al-Tabari, mention that Shapur took Nisibis in his eleventh regnal year; according to the historian David Stone Potter, this regnal year is 252. Another Syriac account, the Liber Caliphorum, from the eighth century, mentions the invasion of the city in 252.
