= Shapur I's second Roman campaign =

Conflict between Persia and Rome in the 200s CE

Shapur I's second Roman campaign was the second of three victorious campaigns that the Persian king Shapur I led against the Roman Empire in 252–256 AD. This campaign took place as part of the Roman–Persian wars, an escalation of the Roman–Parthian Wars.

== Background ==
After Shapur I defeated and killed the Roman Emperor Gordian III, the new Roman Emperor, Philip the Arab, was forced to sign a "disgraceful" treaty with Shapur I and to surrender Mesopotamia and Armenia.

== The war ==
In 252, Shapur invaded the Roman Empire again, conquering Nisibis and destroyed a 60.000 strong Roman force at Barbalissos. The next year, the Sasanian forces laid siege to the city of Emesa and defeated the Roman forces at Antioch. During the years 253-256, the Sasanian armies destroyed and sacked more than 35 cities, including Dura Europos. The burning and looting show that while Shapur I deported a great number of populations, as he had no intention of keeping the territories occupied by his forces.
