= Siege of Antioch (253) =

Sassanid siege and capture of Roman Antioch (253)

- Part of Shapur I's second Roman campaign
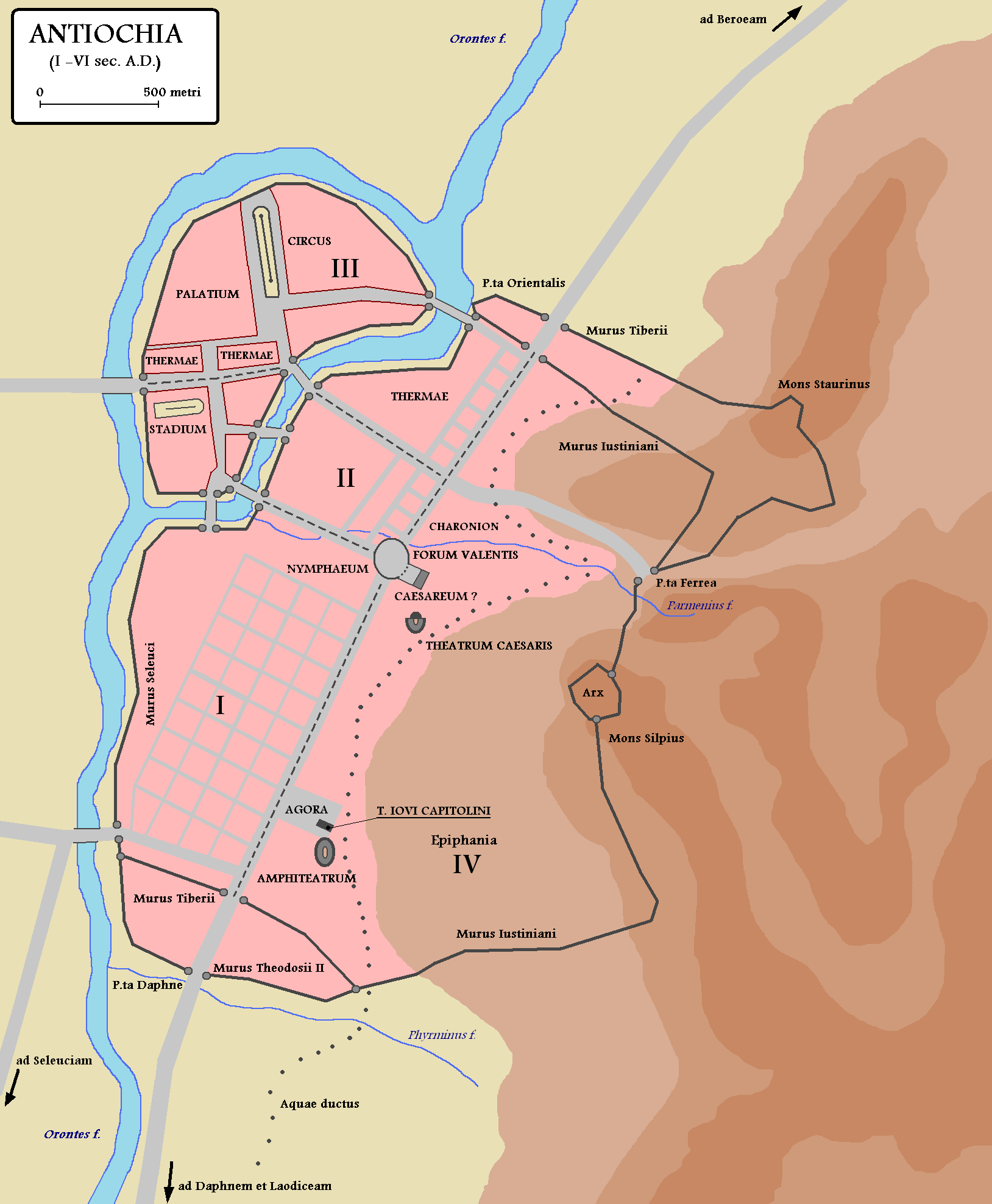
- Map of Antioch in Roman times.
Date	253
Location	Antioch (modern-day Antakya, Hatay, Turkey)
Result	Sasanian victory

Belligerents
Roman Empire	Sassanid Empire

Commanders and leaders
Unknown	Shapur I Hormizd I

Strength
Unknown	Unknown

The siege of Antioch took place when the Sassanids under Shapur I besieged the Roman city of Antioch in 253 after defeating the Romans in the Battle of Barbalissos.
