= Afinia Gemina Baebiana =

Roman empress, wife of Trebonianus Gallus (died 253)

Afinia Gemina Baebiana was the wife of Roman emperor Trebonianus Gallus, who ruled briefly in 251–253.

Almost nothing is known about her life. She had two children, Volusianus and a daughter, Vibia Galla. After Trebonianus Gallus was proclaimed emperor by the soldiers, Herennia Etruscilla, widow of Emperor Decius, was allowed to keep the honorary title Augusta. Afinia appears to have died before Gallus became emperor.
