= Battle of Barbalissos =

Battle between Sasanian Persians and Romans (252)

Coordinates: 36.0610°N 37.8912°E

- Part of Shapur I's second Roman campaign
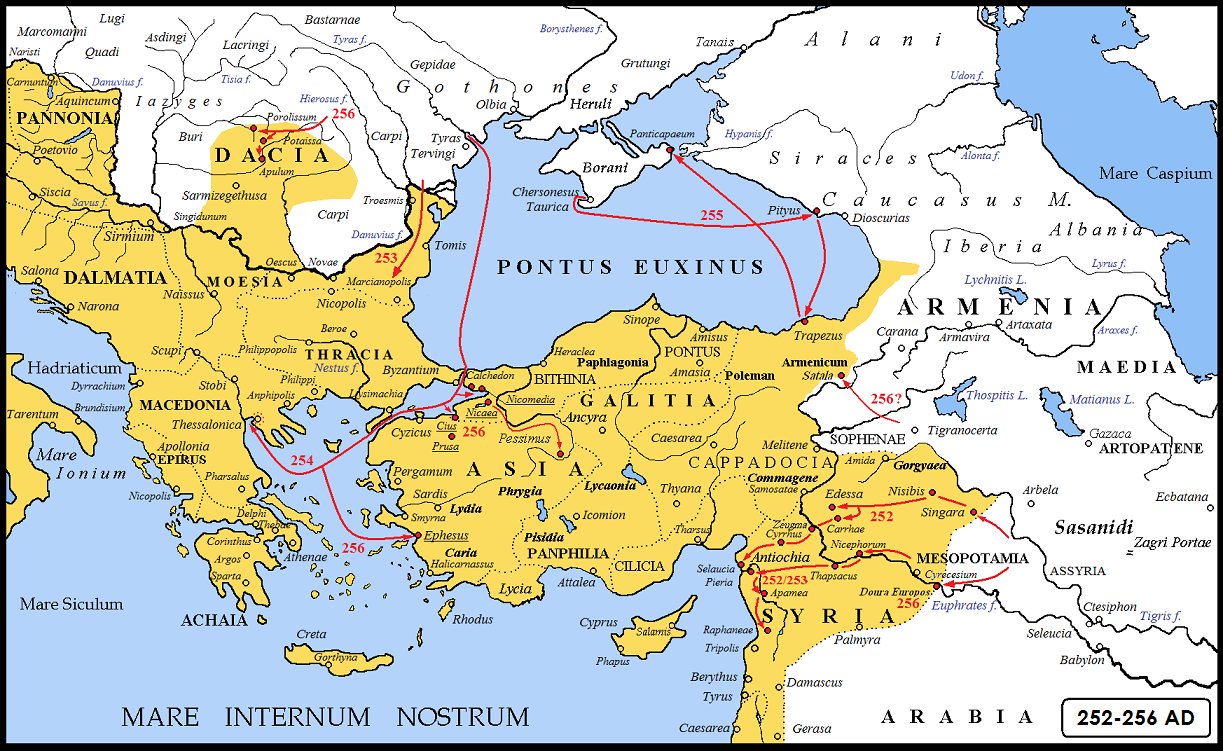
- Barbarian invasions of the Goths, the Carpi, and the Sassanids of Shapur I, in the years 252-256.
Date	252 AD
Location	Barbalissos, Syria (modern Qalʿat al-Bālis, Syria)
Result	Sasanian victory

Belligerents
Sasanian Empire	Roman Empire

Commanders and leaders
Shapur I	

Strength
20,000	60,000

Casualties and losses
Unknown	Roman forces annihilated

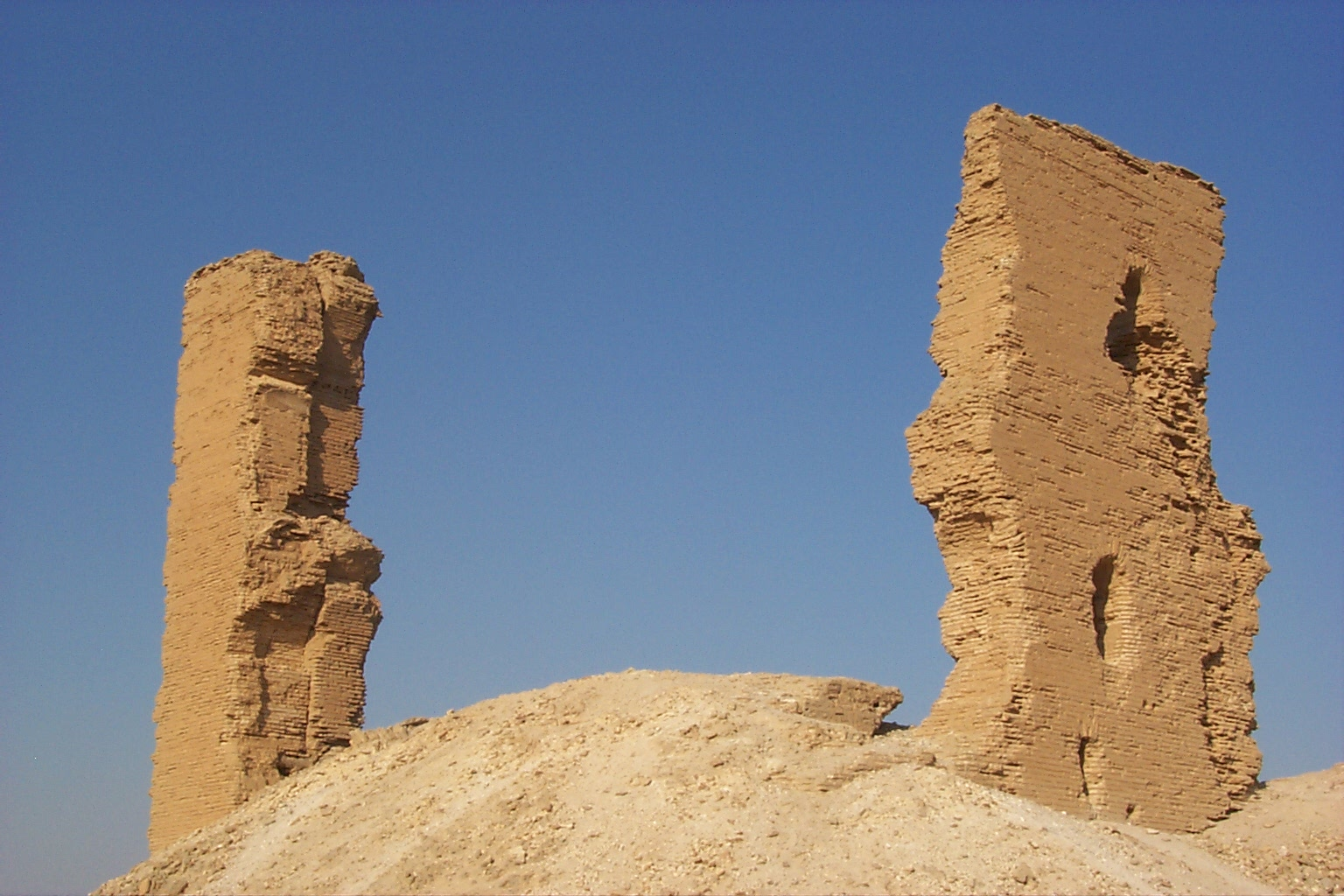

The Battle of Barbalissos was fought between the Sasanians and Romans at Barbalissos. Shapur I used Roman incursions into Armenia as pretext and resumed hostilities with the Romans. The Sasanians attacked a Roman force of 60,000 strong at Barbalissos and the Roman army was destroyed. The defeat of this large Roman force left the Roman east open to attack and led to the eventual capture of Antioch and Dura Europos three years later. This battle is only known through Shapur I's inscription at Naqsh-e Rostam.

== Overview ==
The battle was fought during the reign of Trebonianus Gallus between the Sasanian Persians and Romans at Barbalissos, an old Roman town near Aleppo in modern-day Syria and close to the Euphrates River. The battle was fought in 252 when Shapur I (239-270 AD), King of the Sasanian Empire led his army from the Euphrates River and met with a Roman army 60,000 strong of legionaries, archers, and Roman cavalry. Although the number of forces of the Sasanian army are unclear, through tactics and use of strategy Shapur I managed to win the battle and open a way through the Syrian cities and castles. Based on the place-names listed in the Res Gestae Divi Saporis, it has been suggested that Shapur leap-frogged the key fortresses of Dura Europos and Circesium at the Khabur confluence in order to bee-line towards a major Roman army at Barbalissos, perhaps under the legate of Syria or someone holding an extraordinary command to deal with the Sasanians. After annihilating this army, he split his army into two to neutralize the legionary bases of Raphanea and Zeugma, and perhaps to obfuscate his march on Antioch, which apparently took the locals by surprise. After taking Antioch, he then split his army into three or four forces to raid Syria and eastern Cilicia more widely, while another army raided Cappadocia and captured the legionary base at Satala. Meanwhile, a task force marching from Pirisabora appears to have captured Dura and Circesium, exploiting the fact that the Romans were distracted by the raids into Syria and Anatolia. The defeat was very costly for Valerian who appointed many more armies to stop Shapur I from quick advance into Roman soil and later decided to lead an army of 70,000 legionaries himself in what became known as the Battle of Edessa.

== Sources ==
- Kaveh Farroukh, Sassanian Elite Cavalry AD 224-642
- David S. Potter, The Roman Empire at Bay
- Res Gestae Divi Saporis
