= Danubian provinces =

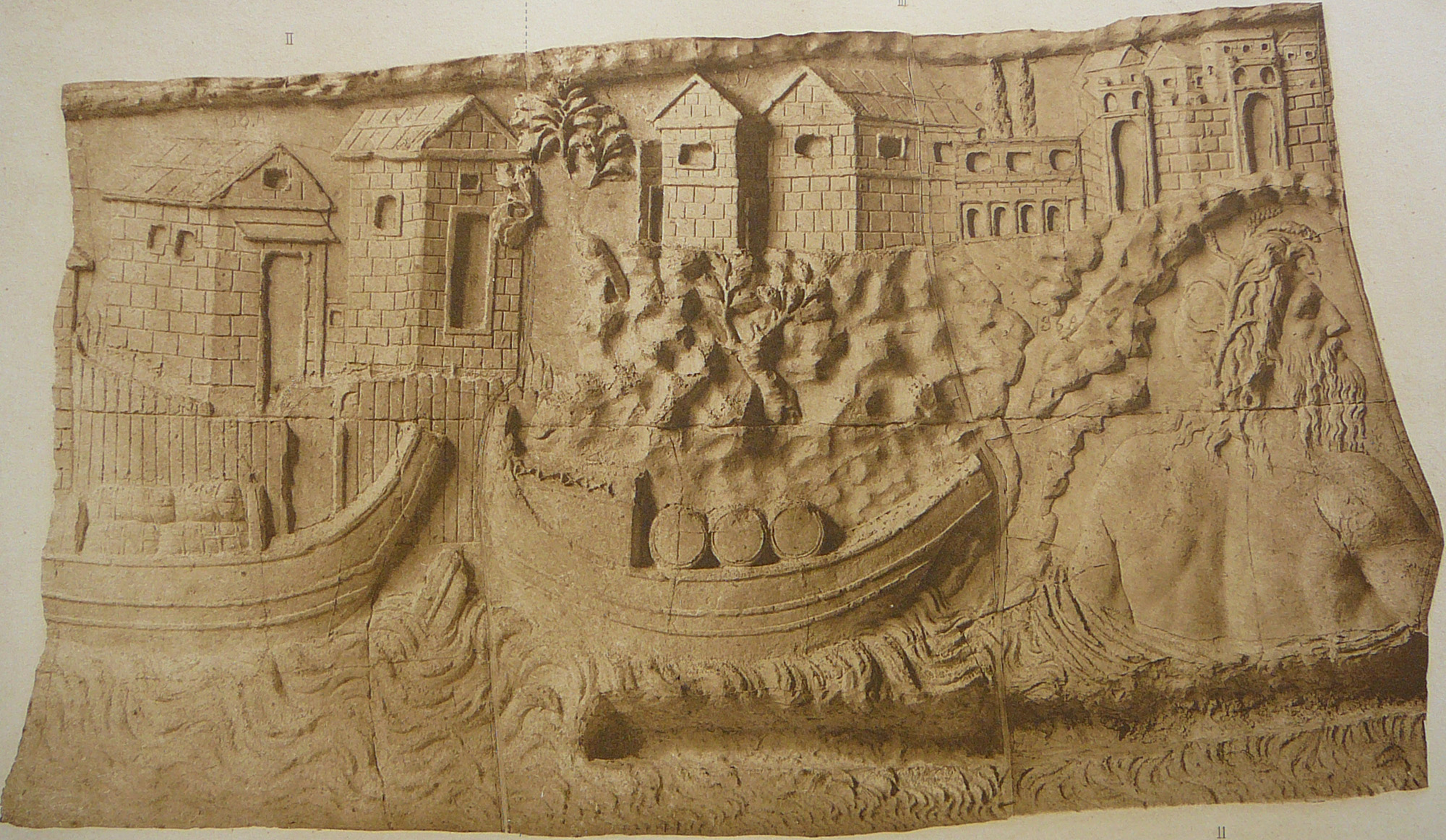
A panel from Trajan's Column depicting shipping on the Danube: ports on the Adriatic Sea provided access to the Danubian provinces

The Danubian provinces of the Roman Empire were the provinces of the Lower Danube, within a geographical area encompassing the middle and lower Danube basins, the Eastern Alps, the Dinarides, and the Balkans. They include Noricum, Dacia (Trajana and Aureliana), the northern part of Dalmatia, Moesia (Inferior and Superior), Scythia Minor, and Pannonia (Superior and Inferior). The Danube defined the region to the north, with the Carpathian Mountains to the north and east. These provinces were important to the Imperial economy as mining regions, and their general significance in the Empire of the 3rd century is indicated by the emperors who came from the region.

The Roman presence in the region can be described as having four phases from Augustus to Hadrian: military conquest under Augustus, and consequent military actions; the establishment of military bases along roads and river crossings under Claudius; the establishment of camps along the river for stationing legions and auxiliaries carried out by the Flavian dynasty and Trajan; and further expansion into Dacia north of the Danube. Hadrian's approach was to defend and maintain, a policy that remained more or less in effect until the latter 4th century, when Roman control disintegrated. The pattern of Roman settlement after the time of Hadrian became standard: a fort (castra), a military town (canabae) associated with it, and a town (municipium) developing two or three miles away.

The Danubian population has been estimated as at least 2 million during the reign of Augustus, and 3 million in the 2nd century, but these figures are not based on hard data, and later archaeological investigations indicate a greater degree of development than had been recognized. In the time of the Antonines, there were perhaps 3 to 6 million inhabitants.
