= Balis (Syria) =

Ancient city in Syria

- Barbalissus
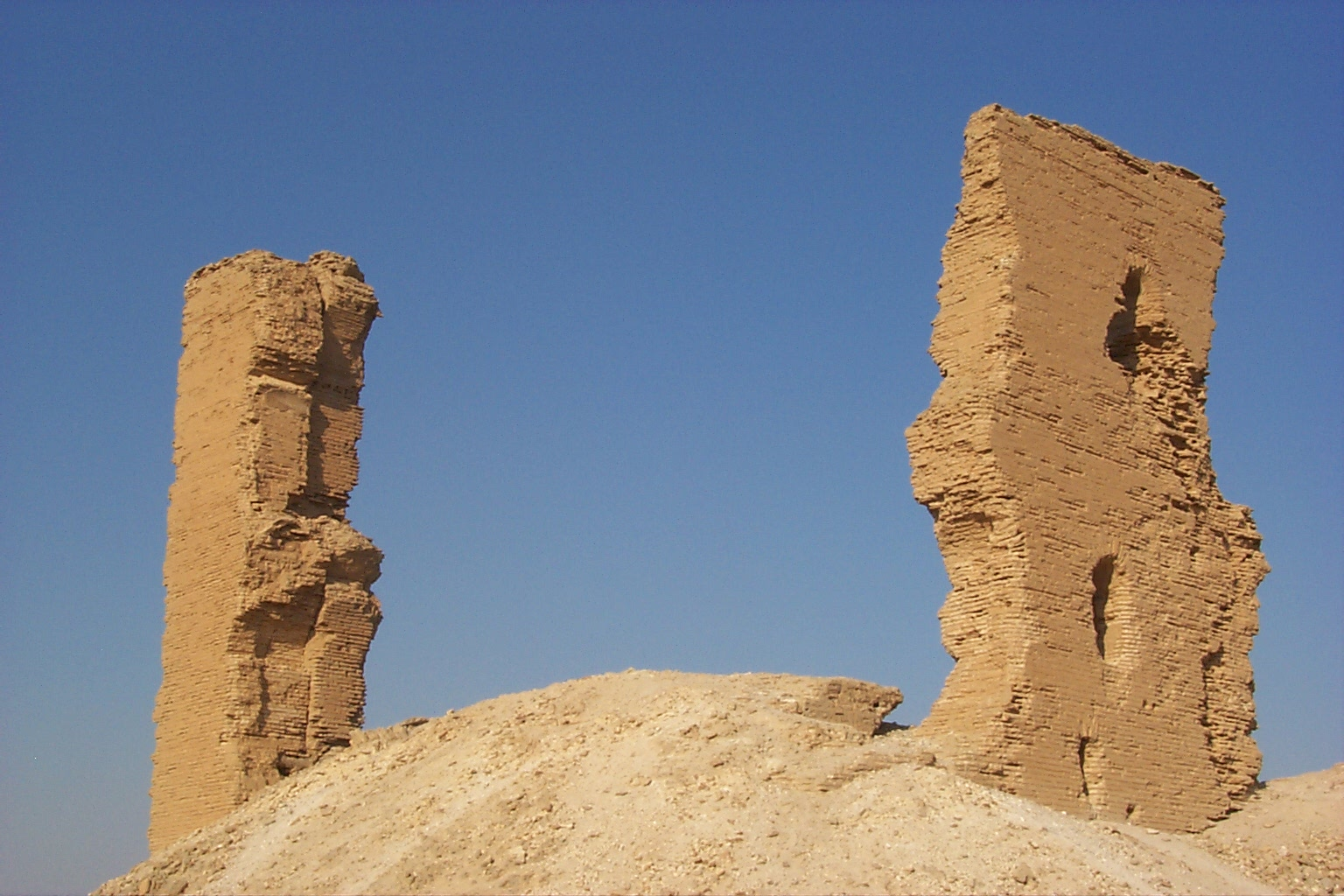
- Byzantine tower at Balis

- Location within Syria
- 35.8366°N 38.3026°E
- Type: settlement
- Cultures: Roman, Byzantine, Islamic
- Location: Near Maskanah, Aleppo Governorate, Syria
- Region: Euphrates Lake shoreline

History
- Abandoned: 14th century
- Event: Battle of Barbalissos (253)

Site notes
- Owner: Public
- Public access: Yes

Balis (Arabic: بالس), also known as Barbalissos (Medieval Greek: Βαρβαλισσός) and Barbalissus (Latin), was an ancient and medieval fortress on the Euphrates River near the ruins of the still more ancient Emar. It is particularly known for the 253 Battle of Barbalissos, where the Roman army was defeated by Sassanid Persia. The fortress town's own ruins are located at the modern Qala'at Balis (Arabic: قلعة بالس) in the Aleppo Governorate of northern Syria.

== History ==
The nearby bend of the Euphrates and its trade routes had been controlled in the 2nd millennium BC by nearby Emar, which was finally destroyed in 1187 BC. The area also seems to have had a prehistoric ford at times.

By the time of the Persian Empire, the area had been resettled and become known by the Aramaic name Bayt Bala. It is likely the area was used during the invasions by Cyrus and Alexander.

Under the Roman Empire, Barbalissus was a city in the province of Euphratensis. An outpost near the Roman border with Parthia and Persia, it served as the garrison town for the Dalmatian Cavalry (Latin: Equites Dalmatae Illyriciani), a unit named for its origin in the Balkans. In 253, the Battle of Barbalissos saw Persians under Shapur I defeat a Roman army, after which he was able to sack and burn all the major cities of Syria Coele, including Antioch, Zeugma, and Samosata.

The Arabic version of the list of the bishops at the First Council of Nicaea in 325 includes an Antonius of Barbalissus. Sources in Greek mention a Bishop Aquilinus of Barbalissus, who, at the time of the Council of Ephesus (431), was a partisan of Nestorius and was for that reason exiled from the bishopric; and Theodoret of Cyrus speaks of a Bishop Marinianus of Barbalissus, who may have been the replacement for Barbalissus, as having been imposed by force. Although Lequien wrote that no Notitia Episcopatuum mentioned Barbalissus, which he suggested was a small fortified town rather than a city, an early 20th-century writer says the diocese is included in one such list, dating from the 6th century, as a suffragan of Hierapolis Bambyce, within the patriarchate of Antioch. It appears in no later Notitia Episcopatuum, apparently because at some unclear date it passed into the possession of the Jacobite Church. The Chronicle of Michael the Syrian gives the names of five Jacobite bishops of Bales or Beit Bales (Syriac): John, Habib, Basil, Timothy, and Elias.

In the mid-6th century, the Byzantine emperor Justinian rebuilt the walls of Barbalissos.

During the Muslim conquest of the Levant, a contingent of warriors from Aleppo under Habib ibn-Maslama arrived at Barbalissos around 637. The Byzantine brothers who served as the city's lords and the city's people surrendered to Arabs under terms: residents could remain if they paid a poll tax in addition to a land tax or they could freely emigrate. Most chose to leave, either to Mesopotamia or to Hierapolis to the north. Qays tribesmen were settled into the abandoned estates and the settlement became known as Balis.

Under the Umayyad Caliphate, the area was bestowed upon the illegitimate prince Maslama ibn Abd al-Malik. In his absences for prolonged military campaigns, his brother Sa'id al-Khayr was presumably responsible for the refortification of the town and the investment of considerable amounts into the area's agricultural development, including the establishment of the Nahr Maslama and the Nahr Sa'id irrigation canals. Their descendants, however, were largely dispossessed during the Abbasid Revolution in 750. Al-Saffah transferred Balis to the prince Sulayman ibn Ali, whose son Muhammad inherited it before it was confiscated by Harun al-Rashid (r. 786–809). Harun made Balis part of his Jund al-Awasim and gave it to his son al-Ma'mun (r. 813–833), who descendants held it at least until the late 9th century.

No longer a residential diocese, the bishopric of Barbalissus is today listed by the Catholic Church as a titular see.
