= Hostilian =

Roman emperor in 251

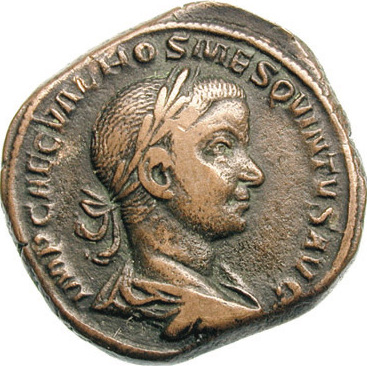
- Sestertius of Hostilian.

Roman emperor
- Reign: c. June – c. July 251
- Predecessor: Decius and Herennius Etruscus
- Successor: Trebonianus Gallus and Volusianus
- Co-emperor: Trebonianus Gallus
- Born: Sirmium
- Died: c. July 251 (aged 20-21)
Names
- Gaius Valens Hostilianus Messius Quintus
Regnal name
- Imperator Caesar Gaius Valens Hostilianus Messius Quintus Augustus
- Father: Decius
- Mother: Herennia Etruscilla

Hostilian (Latin: Gaius Valens Hostilianus Messius Quintus; died c. July 251) was briefly Roman emperor in 251. Hostilian was born to Decius and Herennia Etruscilla at an unknown date and elevated to caesar in 250 by Decius.

After Decius and Herennius Etruscus, Hostilian's brother, were killed at the Battle of Abritus, an ambush by the Goths, Trebonianus Gallus was proclaimed emperor by the legions. Almost immediately, he elevated Hostilian to co-emperor and his own son, Volusianus, to caesar. Hostilian died soon after, either due to plague or being murdered by Trebonianus Gallus.

== History ==
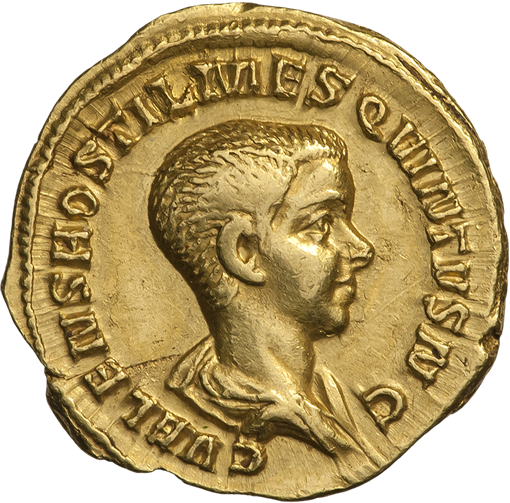
Aureus of Hostilian as caesar

Hostilian was born at an unknown date, to Decius, a Roman general who later became Emperor, and his wife Herennia Etruscilla. He had a brother, Herennius Etruscus, and one sister. His full name based on coinage and inscriptions was Gaius Valens Hostilianus Messius Quintus, but to this the historian Aurelius Victor adds Perpenna or Perperna, a name of Etruscan origin.

In September 249 the army of Decius declared him emperor, in opposition to Philip the Arab. He defeated and killed Philip in a battle near Verona, after which the Roman Senate confirmed Decius's appointment and honoured him with the name Traianus, a reference to Emperor Trajan.

In or around September 250, Decius appointed both his sons caesars and in May 251 Herennius Etruscus was elevated to the rank of augustus, which made Decius and Etruscus co-emperors, with Hostilian as the heir of either or both of them. In June 251, Decius and Herennius Etruscus were killed by the Goths at the Battle of Abritus, and Trebonianus Gallus was declared emperor. To placate the public after this abrupt change of rulers, Gallus elevated Hostilian to augustus. After a short period as co-emperor, Hostilian died in circumstances which are still disputed. His death is sometimes dated to November, but contemporary sources indicate that he died in or before August, probably in July. Aurelius Victor and the author of the Epitome de Caesaribus say that Hostilian died of a plague. Zosimus claims that he was killed by Trebonianus Gallus. Gallus's son Volusianus became the new co-emperor.

Some historians identify Hostilian as the Roman general depicted in the Ludovisi Battle sarcophagus, but this is unlikely given that all of his coins depict him as a beardless young boy. It's possible that both Hostilian and Herennius Etruscus were still children or teenagers at the time of their death.

== Numismatics ==
The aurei of Hostilian fall into four types bearing the bust of Hostilian on the obverse, with the reverse showing: Mars walking to the right; priestly implements; Mercury standing; and Roma seated, holding Victoria.

Regnal titles
Preceded by Decius and Herennius Etruscus	Roman emperor 251; Served alongside: Trebonianus Gallus	Succeeded by Trebonianus Gallus and Volusianus
