= Aemilianus =

Roman emperor in 253 AD

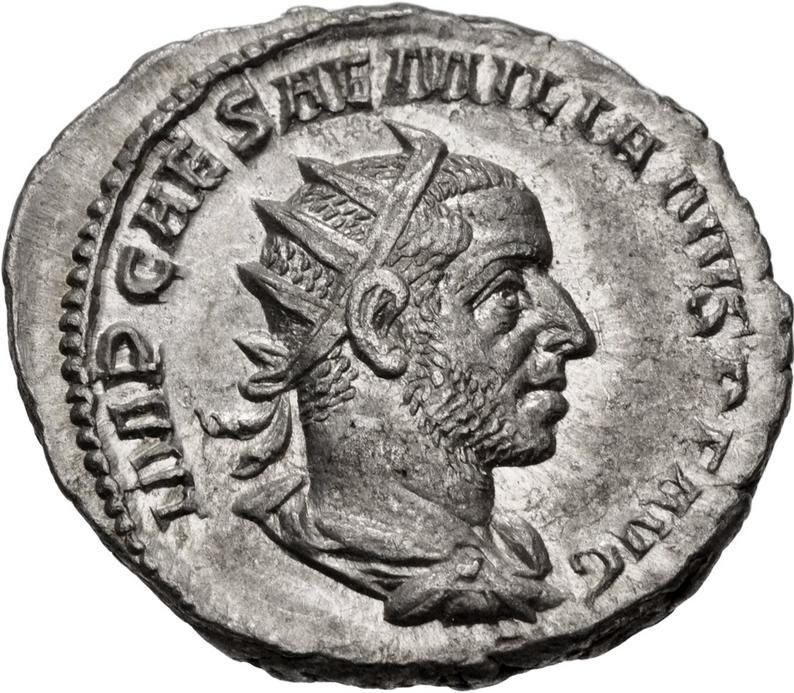
- Coin of Aemilian. Legend: imp(erator) caes(ar) aemilianvs p(ivs) fel(ix) avg(vstvs)

Roman emperor
- Reign: c. July–September 253
- Predecessor: Trebonianus Gallus and Volusianus
- Successor: Valerian and Gallienus
- Born: c. 207; Girba, Africa
- Died: September 253 near Spoletium, Italy (aged approx. 46)
- Spouse: Cornelia Supera
Names
- Marcus Aemilius Aemilianus
Regnal name
- Imperator Caesar Marcus Aemilius Aemilianus Augustus

Marcus Aemilius Aemilianus (/'aɪmɪliːɑːnʊs/; c. 207 – September 253), also known as Aemilian, was Roman emperor for two months in 253.

Commander of the Moesian troops, he obtained an important victory against the invading Goths and was, for this reason, acclaimed emperor by his army. He then moved quickly to Roman Italy, where he defeated Emperor Trebonianus Gallus at the Battle of Interamna Nahars in August 253, only to be killed by his own men a month later when another general, Valerian, proclaimed himself emperor and moved against Aemilian with a larger army.

== Origins ==
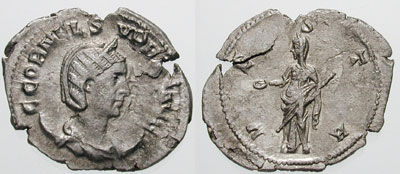
Cornelia Supera (or Supra), was the wife of Aemilianus. Legend: CORNEL. SVPERA AVG. / VESTA

Aemilian was born in the Roman province of Africa. According to the 4th century source Epitome de Caesaribus, he was a Moor born at Girba (modern Djerba, an island off the coast of Tunisia) and was born around the year 207, as he died at the age of 47 (Romans used inclusive counting). The 12th-century historian Joannes Zonaras, who calls him a Libyan rather than a Moor, and another chronicle of the 13th century hold that he was forty at the time of his death in 253.

Regarding his lineage, there are two versions, both exaggerated: while Eutropius and his translator Paeanius probably defame a failed usurper when they say that he was from an insignificant family, John of Antioch may refer to Aemilian's propaganda when he says that the usurper used his ancestry to take power. His praenomen and nomen, reinforced by his cognomen, suggest a descent from a native African who obtained Roman citizenship during the Second Triumvirate, in which his land was ruled by Marcus Aemilius Lepidus.

Aemilian married Cornelia Supera, a woman of African origin; the year of their marriage is unknown, but since both were from the same place, it is possible they married before Aemilian left Africa.

== Military career ==
During the reign of Trebonianus Gallus and his son Volusianus (251–253), Aemilian was sent to the Balkans to command an army. His primary responsibility was to assure peace along the Danube frontier, which had been subject to several attacks by the Goths led by king Cniva.

Gallus secured the throne after the death of Emperor Decius at the hands of Cniva in the Battle of Abrittus (251), and later had to manage an outbreak of plague that devastated Rome. He was not popular with the army, mainly due to humiliating treaties signed in 251 with the Goths and King Shapur I of Persia who attacked Syria. According to John of Antioch, upon his appointment to the Moesian command, Aemilian was already envious of Gallus and plotted treachery against him. He was also an opponent of the Roman Senate, and his seditious plans are confirmed by Jerome and Jordanes.

== Rise ==
In 253, the Goths, led by king Cniva, claimed they had not received the tribute due from the Romans according to the treaty of 251. They crossed the border and attacked Cappadocia, Pessinus, and Ephesus. Modern historians believe that this missing payment was not a change in Roman policy, and the Goths were more likely trying to capitalize on their military prowess. Aemilian had command of the army assigned to defend the area, but the recent defeat at the Battle of Abrittus put his troops on edge. Aemilian exhorted them, reminding them of Roman honor (according to Zosimus) and promising tribute from the Goths (according to Zonaras). The Romans took the Goths by surprise, killing most of them, followed by an invasion of Goth territory resulting in booty and the liberation of prisoners. The Roman soldiers, gathered by Aemilian, acclaimed him emperor. Jordanes claims, however, that Aemilian's troops plundered Roman territory, rather than keep the tribute of the Goths.

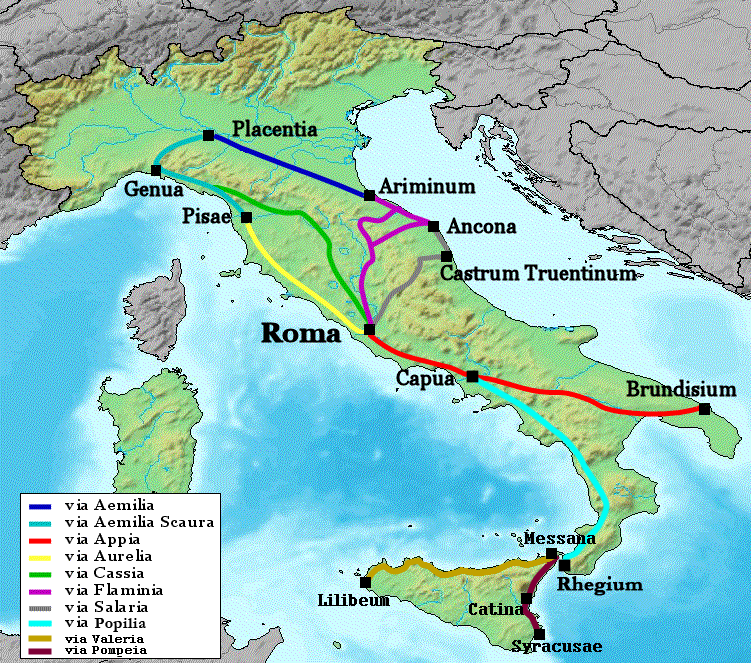
The Flaminian Way, here in purple, divided into two branches next to modern Terni; Aemilian, who was descending from north upon Rome, defeated Trebonianus Gallus on the eastern branch.

With his few men, Aemilian left his province unguarded and moved quickly towards Rome to meet the legitimate emperor, Gallus, before the latter could receive reinforcements. While Aemilian descended upon Rome along the Flaminian Way, Gallus and Volusianus had him proclaimed "enemy of the State" by the Roman senate, then exited Rome to meet the usurper. This strategy suggests that Aemilian's army was smaller than theirs, as they probably did not expect reinforcements to come in time but trusted their larger army to win the clash. The two armies met at the Battle of Interamna Nahars near modern Terni, at the southern end of the eastern branch of the Flaminia, and Aemilian won the battle; Gallus and Volusianus fled to the north with a few followers, probably as a delay tactic before the arrival of reinforcements, but, in late July or early August 253, at Forum Flaminii (modern San Giovanni Profiamma), on the western branch of the Flaminia, they were killed by some of their own guards, who thought that their betrayal could earn them a reward.

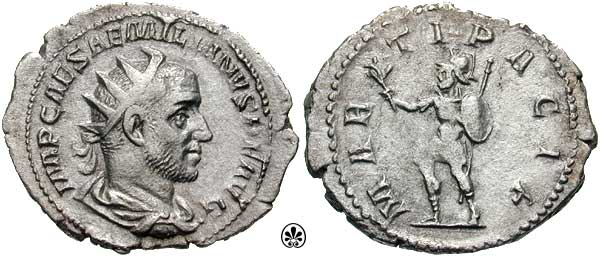
Coin of Aemilian, showing at the obverse the god of war Mars, a reference to the military virtues of the emperor. Legend: IMP. CAES. AEMILIANVS AVG. P. F. AVG. / MARTI PACIF.

Aemilian continued towards Rome. The Senate, after a short opposition, decided to recognize him as emperor. According to some sources, Aemilian then wrote to the Senate, promising to fight for the Empire in Thrace and against Persia, and to relinquish his power to the Senate, of which he considered himself a general. Aemilian received the titles of Pius, Felix and Pater Patriae, the tribunicia potestas, and was elevated to the rank of pontifex maximus; he was not, however, elevated to consulate (possibly a hint of his non-senatorial birth). His coinage shows that his propaganda focused on his capability as a military commander—he defeated the Goths when nobody thought this possible, and thus he was the right man for the job of restoring the power of the Roman Empire.

== Fall ==
Valerian, governor of the Rhine provinces, was on his way south with an army which, according to Zosimus, had been called in as a reinforcement by Gallus. But modern historians believe this army, possibly mobilized for an incumbent campaign in the East, moved only after Gallus' death to support Valerian's bid for power. Emperor Aemilian's men, fearful of a civil war and Valerian's larger force, mutinied. They killed Aemilian at Spoletium or at the Sanguinarium bridge, between Oriculum and Narnia (halfway between Spoletium and Rome), and recognized Valerian as the new emperor. After Aemilian's death, which happened between late July and mid-September, a damnatio memoriae against him was declared. The 4th-century Chronograph of 354 records his reign as having lasted 88 days, but this is a confusion with Florianus, who reigned the same amount of days. Aemilianus' sole reign was one of the shortest in Rome's history, as he only ruled about a month between Trebonianus Gallus' death and his own murder.

It is possible that the usurper Silbannacus was an officer left by Aemilian in Rome before moving against Valerian, who later tried to become emperor but then was killed.

The life and troubled administration of emperor Aemilian was summarized by the Roman historian Eutropius stating that:

Aemilianus came from an extremely insignificant family, his reign was even more insignificant, and he was slain in the third month.

== Notes ==
Regnal titles
Preceded by Trebonianus Gallus; Volusianus	Roman emperor 253	Succeeded by Valerian
