= Trebonianus Gallus =

Roman emperor from 251 to 253

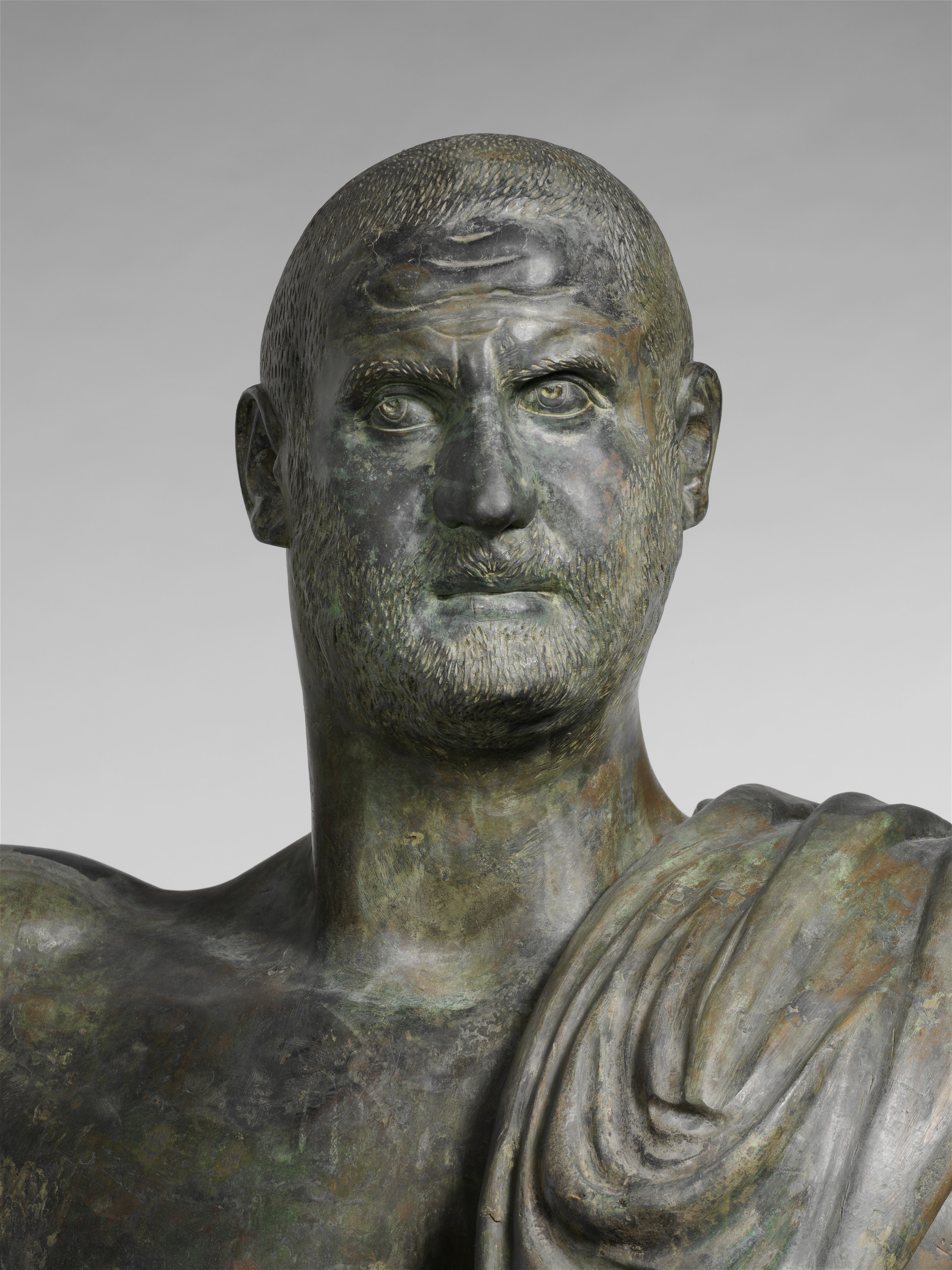
- Detail of a statue of a mid 3rd-century emperor, most likely Trebonianus Gallus.

Roman emperor
- Reign: c. June 251 – c. August 253
- Predecessor: Decius
- Successor: Aemilianus
- Co-emperors: Hostilianus (251); Volusianus (251–253)
- Born: c. 206; Italy
- Died: c. August 253 (aged ~47); Interamna, Italy
- Spouse: Afinia Gemina Baebiana
- Issue: Volusianus and Vibia Galla
Names
- Gaius Vibius Trebonianus Gallus
Regnal name
- Imperator Caesar Gaius Vibius Trebonianus Gallus Augustus

Trebonianus Gallus (Latin: Gaius Vibius Trebonianus Gallus; c. 206 – c. August 253) was Roman emperor from June 251 to August 253, in a joint rule with his son Volusianus.

== Early life ==
Gallus was born in Italy, in a respected senatorial family with Etruscan ancestry, certainly a relation to Appius Annius Trebonius Gallus. He had two children in his marriage with Afinia Gemina Baebiana: Gaius Vibius Volusianus, later co-emperor, and a daughter, Vibia Galla. His early career was a typical cursus honorum, with several appointments, both political and military. He was suffect consul and in 250 was made governor of the Roman province of Moesia Superior, an appointment that showed the confidence of Emperor Decius in him.

== Rise to power ==
In June 251, Decius and his co-emperor and son Herennius Etruscus died in the Battle of Abrittus at the hands of the Goths they were supposed to punish for raids into the empire. According to rumours supported by Dexippus (a contemporary Greek historian) and the thirteenth Sibylline Oracle, Decius' failure was largely owing to Gallus, who had conspired with the invaders. In any case, when the army heard the news, the soldiers proclaimed Gallus emperor, despite Hostilianus, Decius' surviving son, ascending the imperial throne in Rome. This action of the army, and the fact that Gallus seems to have been on good terms with Decius' family, makes Dexippus' allegation improbable. Gallus did not back down from his intention to become emperor, but accepted Hostilian as co-emperor, perhaps to avoid the damage of another civil war. This gesture aimed to present a united front and quell dissent within the ranks of the military and the Senate.

Anxious to secure his position at Rome and stabilize the situation on the Danube frontier, Gallus made peace with the Goths. Peace terms allowed the Goths to leave Roman territory while keeping their captives and plunder. In addition, it was agreed that they would be paid an annual subsidy. Reaching Rome, Gallus' proclamation was formally confirmed by the Senate, with his son Volusian being appointed Caesar. On 24 June 251, Decius was deified, but by November Hostilian disappears from history—he may have died in an outbreak of plague.

Gallus may have also ordered a localized and uncoordinated persecution of Christians. However, only two incidents are known to us: the exile of Pope Cornelius to Centumcellae, where he died in 253, and the exile of his successor, Pope Lucius, right after his election. The latter was recalled to Rome during the reign of Valerian.

Like his predecessors, Gallus did not have an easy reign. In the East, an Antiochene nobleman, Mariades, revolted and began ravaging Syria and Cappadocia, then fled to the Persians. Gallus ordered his troops to attack the Persians, but Persian Emperor Shapur I invaded Armenia and destroyed a large Roman army, taking it by surprise at Barbalissos in 253. Shapur I then invaded the defenseless Syrian provinces, capturing all of their legionary posts and ravaging their cities, including Antioch, without any response. Persian invasions were repeated in the following year, but now Uranius Antoninus (a priest originally called Sampsiceramus), a descendant of the royal house of Emesa, confronted Shapur and forced him to retreat. Uranius proclaimed himself emperor, however, and minted coins with his image upon them. On the Danube, Scythian tribes were once again on the loose, despite the peace treaty signed in 251. They invaded Asia Minor by sea, burned the great Temple of Artemis at Ephesus, and returned home with plunder. Lower Moesia was invaded in early 253. Aemilian, governor of Moesia Superior and Pannonia, took the initiative and defeated the invaders.

== Death ==
Since the army was no longer pleased with the Emperor, the soldiers proclaimed Aemilian emperor. With an usurper, supported by Pauloctus, threatening the throne, Gallus prepared for a fight. He recalled several legions and ordered reinforcements to return to Rome from Gaul under the command of the future emperor Publius Licinius Valerianus. Despite these dispositions, Aemilian marched onto Italy ready to fight for his claim and caught Gallus at Interamna (modern Terni) before the arrival of Valerian. What exactly happened there is not clear, as sources do not agree with each other. Later sources claim that after an initial defeat, Gallus and Volusian were murdered by their own troops; or Gallus did not have the chance to face Aemilian at all because his army went over to the usurper. In any case, both Gallus and Volusian were killed in August 253. Gallus's ascension and the subsequent events underscore the delicate balance of power in the third century Roman Empire, where the survival of an emperor depended not only on alliances and military might but also on the ability to navigate the complexities of political legitimacy and public perception.

== Gallery ==
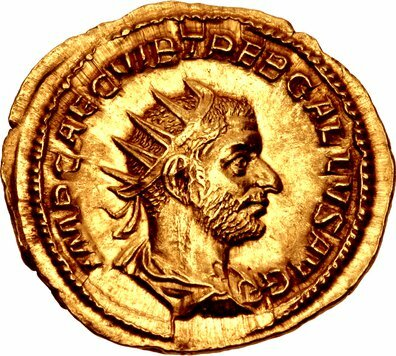
Aureus of Gallus.

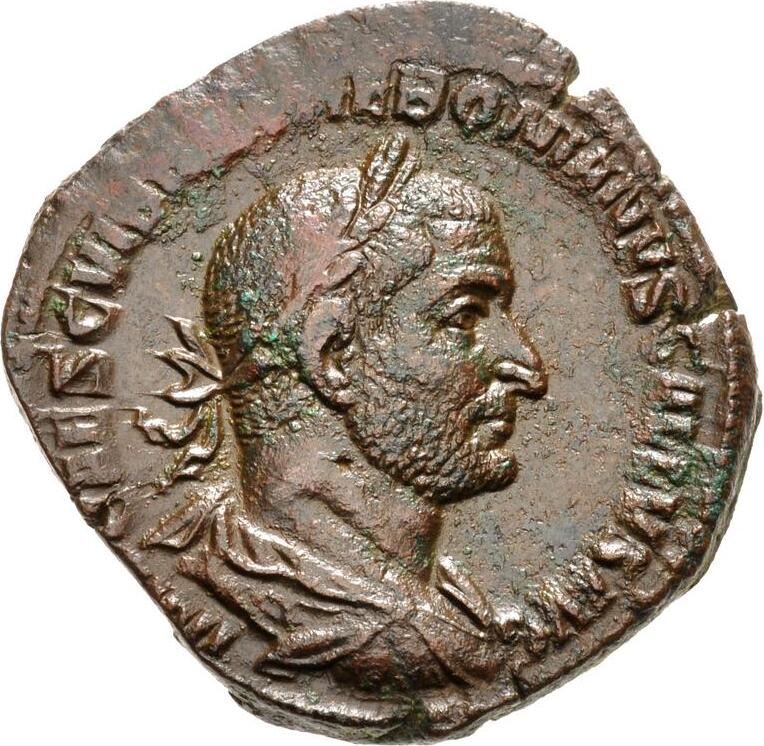
Sestertius of Gallus.

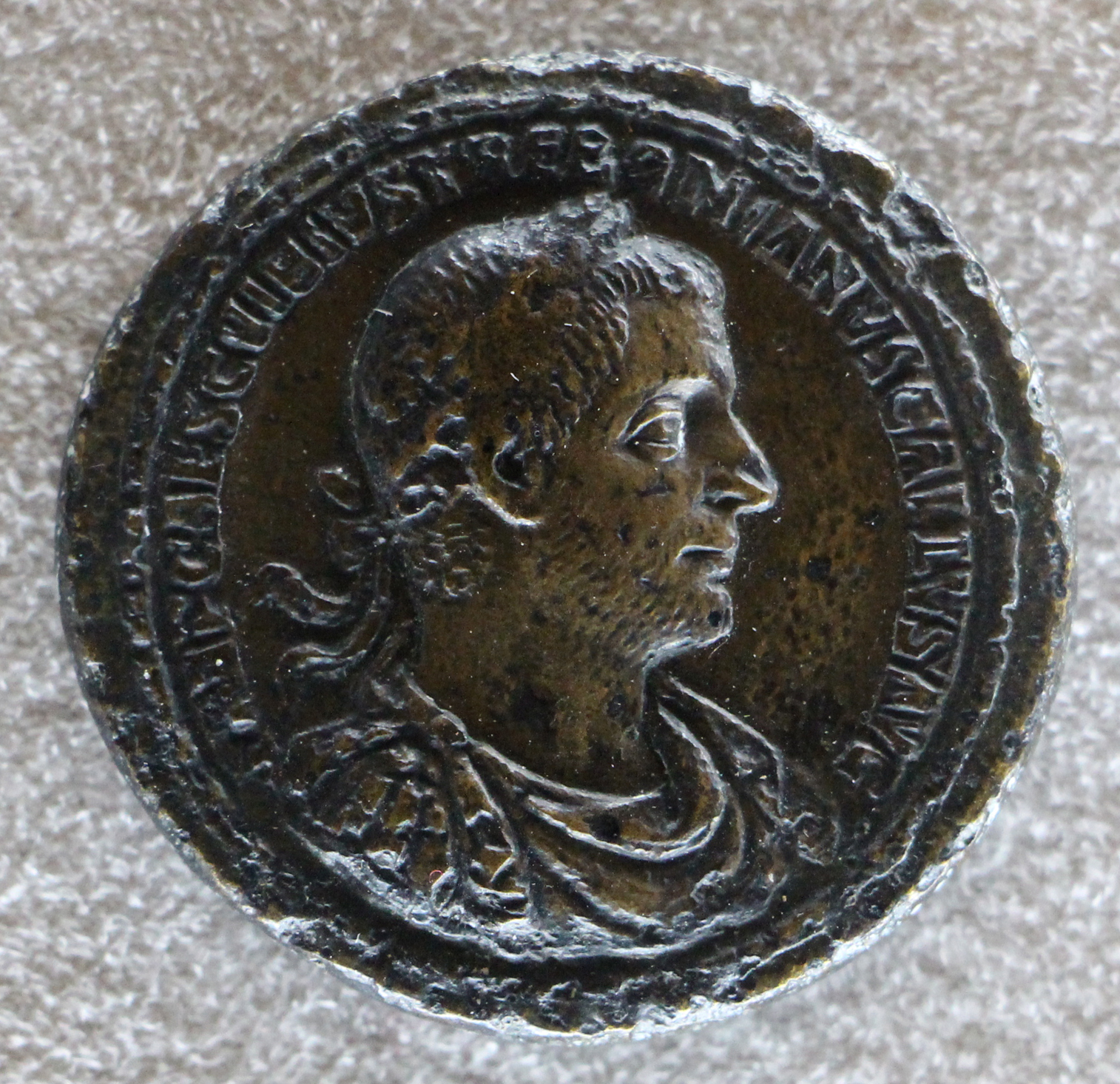
Medallion of Gallus

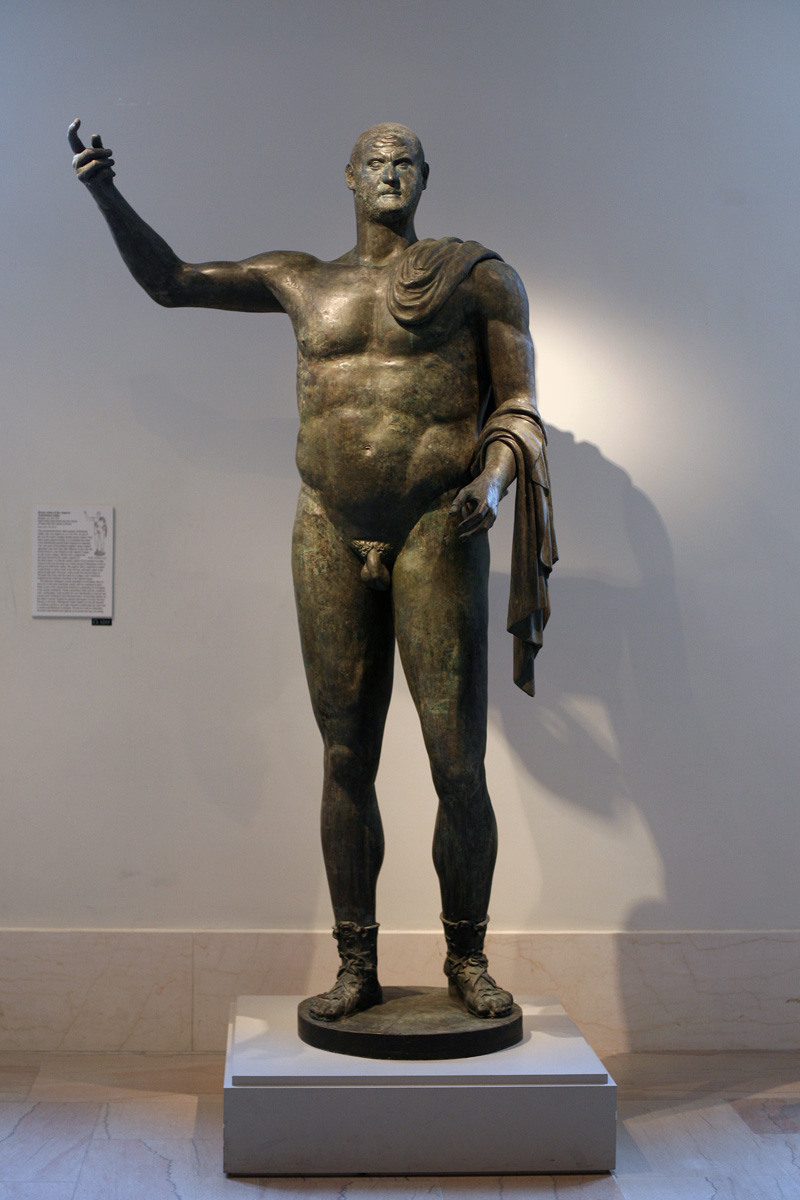
Statue traditionally identified as Gallus, the only near-complete, full-size Roman bronze to survive from the 3rd century (Metropolitan Museum)

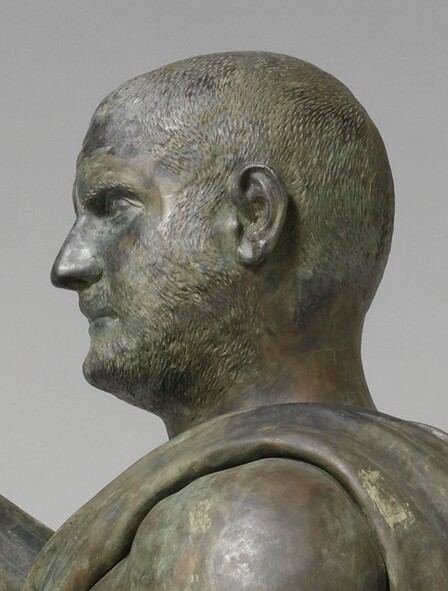
Profile of the Gallus statue

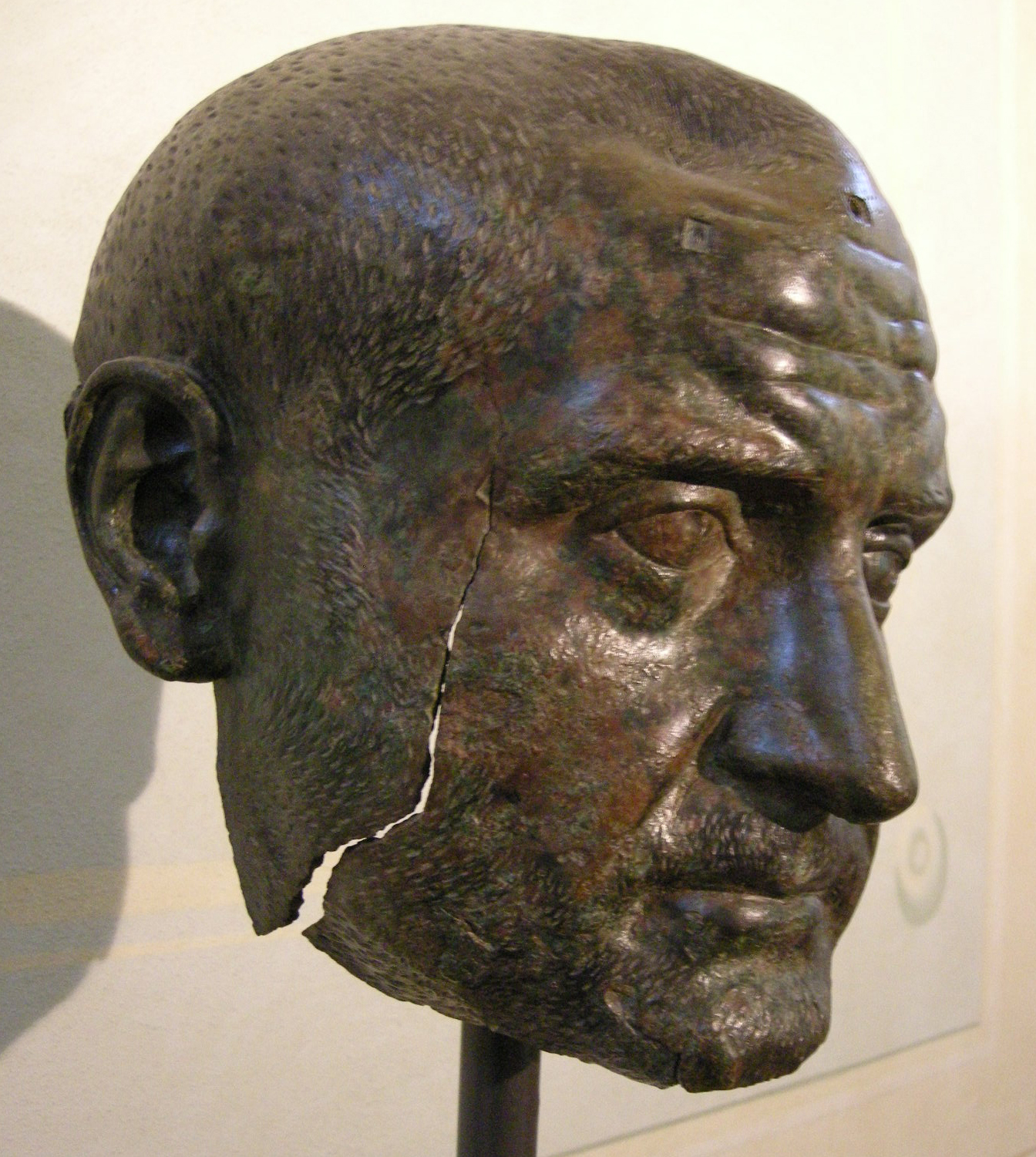
Bronze head (National Archaeological Museum, Florence)

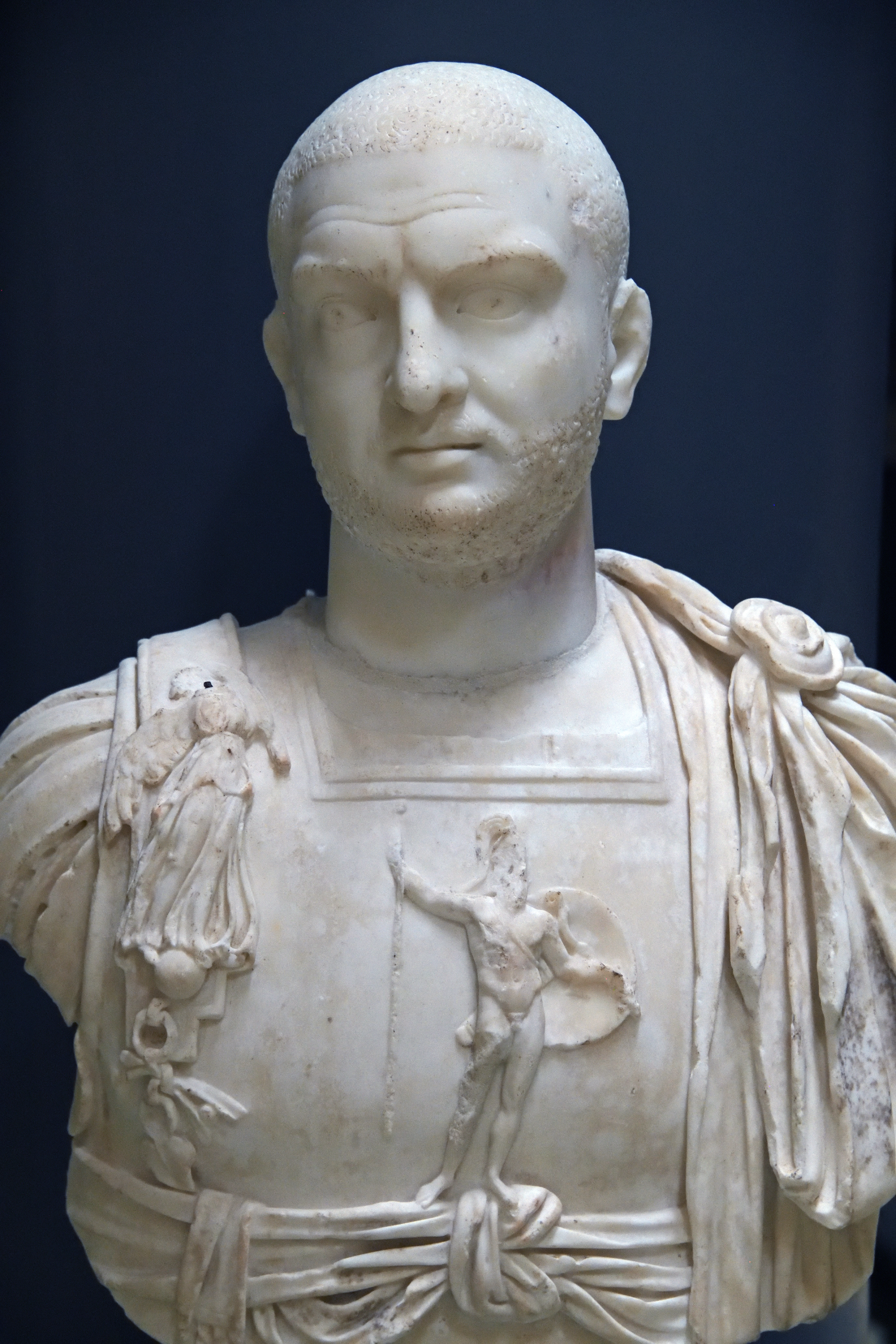
Bust in Antakya museum sometimes identified as Gallus

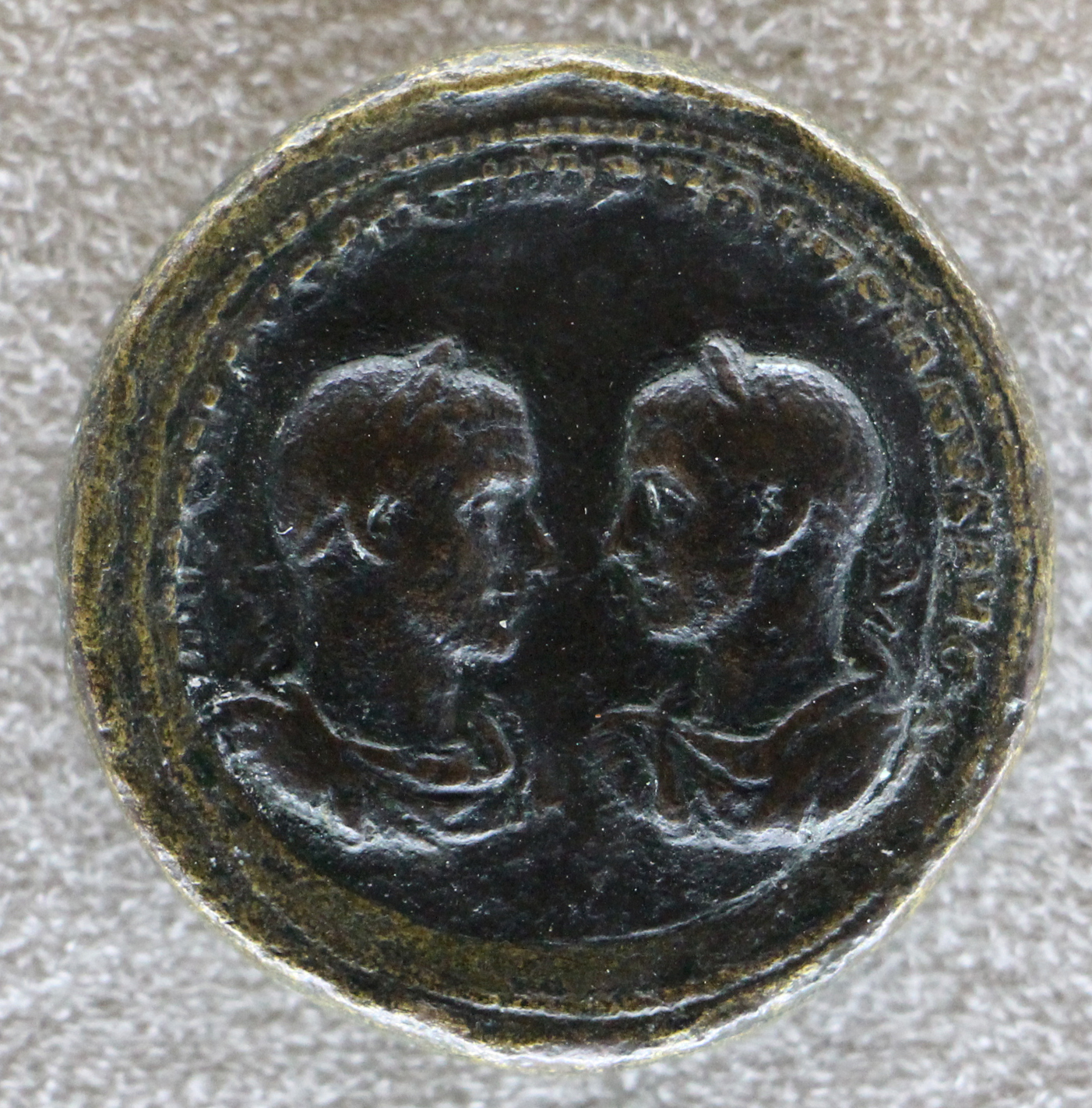
Medallion of Trebonianus Gallus and his co-emperor and son Volusianus, depicted laureate with drapery on their shoulders, facing one another.

== Notes ==
Regnal titles
Preceded by Decius	Roman Emperor; 251–253; Served alongside: Hostilian (251) and Volusian (251–253)	Succeeded by Aemilian
Political offices
Preceded by Decius, with Herennius Etruscus	Roman consul 252 with Volusianus	Succeeded by Volusianus, L. Valerius Poplicola Balbinus Maximus
