= Marcus Ulpius Traianus (father of Trajan) =

1st century AD Roman general and senator

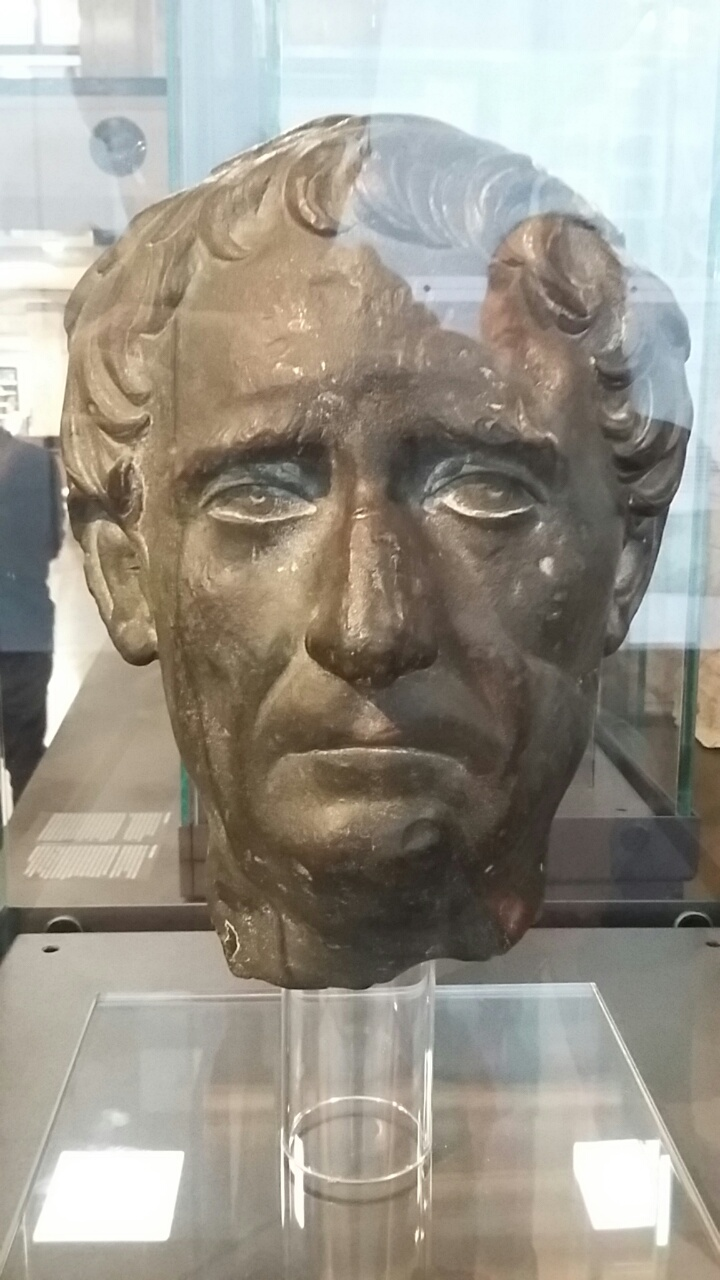
- Bust at the National Museum of Serbia, Belgrade, usually identified as Trajan's father. It may instead depict Trajan himself.
- Born: 1st century AD; Italica, Baetica, Roman Empire
- Died: 1st century AD
- Spouse: Marcia
- Children: Marciana and Trajan
- Family: gens Ulpia

Marcus Ulpius Traianus (fl. 1st century AD) was a Roman general and senator. He was the biological father of emperor Trajan.

== Family ==
Traianus belonged to a branch of the gens Ulpia, which originally came from the Umbrian city of Tuder, but he was born and raised in the Roman colony of Italica, north of modern Santiponce and northwest of Seville, in the Roman Province of Hispania Baetica. The town was founded in 206 BC by Scipio Africanus, as a settlement for wounded and invalid veterans of the wars against Carthage. The Ulpii, like the Aelii and the Traii, were among the leading Roman families of the city. From the latter family came the ancestors of Traianus, who intermarried with the Ulpii, giving rise to the cognomen Traianus. Since the father of Traianus joined the ranks of the senators in Rome, it is very likely that his grandfather was already a member of the Roman Senate. The ancestry of Traianus' mother is unknown. His sister Ulpia was the mother of Publius Aelius Hadrianus Afer, and grandmother of the emperor Hadrian. Traianus married a Roman noblewoman named Marcia. She was the elder sister of Marcia Furnilla, the second wife of Titus, which enabled her to further her husband's career. They had two children: a daughter, Ulpia Marciana, and a son, Marcus, the future emperor Trajan.

== Career ==
The chronology of Traianus' career is uncertain. He may have taken his seat in the senate by the reign of Claudius. In the time of Nero, he may have commanded a legion under the general Gnaeus Domitius Corbulo; during the First Jewish–Roman War, from AD 67 to 68, he came into favour with the future emperor Vespasian, then governor of Judaea, under whom he commanded the Tenth Legion. After his accession to the Empire, Vespasian recognized Traianus' military successes by awarding him the governorship of Cappadocia, and naming him consul suffectus for the months of September and October in AD 72. (Note: Gallivan dated Trajan's consulship to AD 70, based on his arrangement of the fragments of tablet 'E' of the Fasti Ostienses; however, subsequent recovery of fragments allowed Vidman to date his tenure to the months of September and October of AD 72.) After his consulship, Trajan served as governor of Syria from AD 73 to 74, then proconsul of Asia from AD 79 to 80. He was also governor of Hispania Baetica, but the time of this appointment is unknown.

== Legacy ==
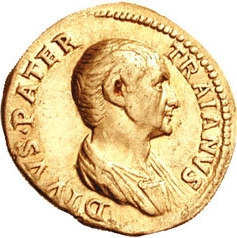
Reverse of Roman aureus struck under Trajan, AD 115, commemorating the elder Traianus after his deification.

Traianus lived out his final years in honor and distinction. Indirect evidence suggests that he may have died before his son became emperor in AD 98. In AD 100, his son founded a colony in North Africa, named Colonia Marciana Ulpia Trajana Thamugadi after his mother and father; today the town is known as Timgad, in Algeria. In AD 112, Traianus was deified by his son, becoming known as Divus Traianus Pater.

== Nerva–Antonine family tree ==
Nerva–Antonine family tree

Q. Marcius Barea Soranus	Q. Marcius Barea Sura	Antonia Furnilla	M. Cocceius Nerva	Sergia Plautilla	P. Aelius Hadrianus
Titus (r. 79–81)	Marcia Furnilla	Marcia	Trajanus Pater	Nerva (r. 96–98)	Ulpia (Note: Sister of Trajan's father: Giacosa (1977), p. 7.)	Aelius Hadrianus Marullinus
Flavia (Note: Giacosa (1977), p. 8.)	Marciana (Note: Levick (2014), p. 161.)	C. Salonius Matidius (Note: Husband of Ulpia Marciana: Levick (2014), p. 161.)	Trajan (r. 98–117)	Plotina	P. Acilius Attianus	P. Aelius Afer (Note: Giacosa (1977), p. 7.)	Paulina Major (Note: DIR contributor (Herbert W. Benario, 2000), "Hadrian".)
Lucius Mindius (2)	Libo Rupilius Frugi (3)	Salonia Matidia (Note: Giacosa (1977), p. 9.)	L. Vibius Sabinus (1) (Note: Husband of Salonia Matidia: Levick (2014), p. 161.)
Paulina Minor	L. Julius Ursus Servianus (Note: Smith (1870), "Julius Servianus".)
Matidia Minor	Sabina	Hadrian (Note: Smith (1870), "Hadrian", pp. 319–322.) (r. 117–138)	Antinous (Note: Lover of Hadrian: Lambert (1984), p. 99 and passim; deification: Lamber (1984), pp. 2–5, etc.)
C. Fuscus Salinator I	Julia Serviana Paulina
M. Annius Verus (Note: Husband of Rupilia Faustina: Levick (2014), p. 163.)	Rupilia Faustina (Note: Levick (2014), p. 163.) (Note: It is uncertain whether Rupilia Faustina was Frugi's daughter by Salonia Matidia or another woman.)	Boionia Procilla	Cn. Arrius Antoninus
L. Ceionius Commodus	Appia Severa	C. Fuscus Salinator II
L. Caesennius Paetus	Arria Antonina	Arria Fadilla (Note: Levick (2014), p. 162.)	T. Aurelius Fulvus
L. Caesennius Antoninus	L. Commodus	Plautia	unknown (Note: Levick (2014), p. 164.)	C. Avidius Nigrinus
M. Annius Verus	Calvisia Domitia Lucilla (Note: Wife of M. Annius Verus: Giacosa (1977), p. 10.)	Fundania (Note: Wife of M. Annius Libo: Levick (2014), p. 163.)	M. Annius Libo	Faustina	Antoninus Pius (r. 138–161)	L. Aelius Caesar	Avidia
Cornificia	Marcus Aurelius (r. 161–180) (Note: Giacosa (1977), p. 10.)	Faustina Minor	C. Avidius Cassius (Note: The epitomator of Cassius Dio (72.22) gives the story that Faustina the Elder promised to marry Avidius Cassius. This is also echoed in HA "Marcus Aurelius" 24.)	Aurelia Fadilla	Lucius Verus (r. 161–169) (1)	Ceionia Fabia	Plautius Quintillus (Note: Husband of Ceionia Fabia: Levick (2014), p. 164.)	Q. Servilius Pudens	Ceionia Plautia
Cornificia Minor (Note: Levick (2014), p. 117.)	M. Petronius Sura	Commodus (r. 177–192)	Fadilla	M. Annius Verus Caesar	Ti. Claudius Pompeianus (2)	Lucilla	M. Plautius Quintillus	Junius Licinius Balbus	Servilia Ceionia
Petronius Antoninus	L. Aurelius Agaclytus (2)	Aurelia Sabina	L. Antistius Burrus (1)	Plautius Quintillus	Plautia Servilla	C. Furius Sabinus Timesitheus	Maecia Faustina	Junius Licinius Balbus?
Furia Sabinia Tranquillina	Gordian III (r. 238–244)

- (1) = 1st spouse
- (2) = 2nd spouse
- (3) = 3rd spouse
- Reddish-purple indicates emperor of the Nerva–Antonine dynasty
  lighter purple indicates designated imperial heir of said dynasty who never reigned
  grey indicates unsuccessful imperial aspirants
  bluish-purple indicates emperors of other dynasties
- dashed lines indicate adoption; dotted lines indicate love affairs/unmarried relationships
- Small Caps = posthumously deified (Augusti, Augustae, or other)

Notes:

Except where otherwise noted, the notes below indicate that an individual's parentage is as shown in the above family tree.

References:
- Giacosa, Giorgio (1977). Women of the Caesars: Their Lives and Portraits on Coins. Translated by Holloway, R. Ross. Milan: Edizioni Arte e Moneta. ISBN 0-8390-0193-2.
- Lambert, Royston (1984). Beloved and God: The Story of Hadrian and Antinous. New York: Viking. ISBN 0-670-15708-2.
- Levick, Barbara (2014). Faustina I and II: Imperial Women of the Golden Age. Oxford University Press. ISBN 978-0-19-537941-9.
- Smith, William, ed. (1870). Dictionary of Greek and Roman Biography and Mythology.

== See also ==
- Ulpia gens
