= Suettia gens =

Ancient Roman family

The gens Suettia or Suetia was an obscure plebeian family at ancient Rome. Members of this gens are mentioned in the time of Cicero, but none of them achieved any of the higher offices of the Roman state.

== Origin ==
The nomen Suettius is probably derived from the Latin adjective suetus, "familiar". Chase classifies the nomen among those gentilicia that either originated at Rome, or cannot be shown to have come from anywhere else. However, several early inscriptions of this gens are from Campania, and many others are concentrated in the Campanian cities of Casilinum and Pompeii, strongly hinting at a Campanian origin.

== Praenomina ==
The Suettii employed a variety of common praenomina, chiefly Aulus, Gaius, Lucius, Servius, and Sextus. Of these, only Servius was relatively distinctive, although by no means rare. Other praenomina are found on occasion, and in one inscription we find an Anthus Suettius, perhaps an example of a cognomen being used in place of a praenomen, or perhaps an old praenomen more typically found as a surname.

== Members ==
This list includes abbreviated praenomina. For an explanation of this practice, see filiation.

- Servius Suetius Ser. l., a freedman and balneator, or bath attendant, named in an inscription from Casilinum in Campania, dating from 106 BC.
- Marcus Suetius, the master of the slave Dipilus, named in an inscription dating from Casilinum, dating from 98 BC.
- Lucius Suetius, an eques called by Cicero as a witness in the trial of Verres.
- Anthus Suettius P. f., a youth buried at Casilinum, aged fifteen, during the latter half of the first century BC, with a monument from his father, Publius.
- Publius Suettius, dedicated a tomb at Casilinum to his son, Anthus, who died during the latter half of the first century BC.
- Suettia Ɔ. l. Trophime, a freedwoman buried at Casilinum during the latter half of the first century BC, with a monument dedicated by the freedman Gnaeus Sextius Gorgia.
- Gaius Suettius, the master of Faustus, a slave named in an inscription from Aquinum in Latium, dating from 13 BC.
- Suetia Cn. l. Hilara, a freedwoman buried at Allifae in Samnium, during the late first century BC, or early first century AD.
- Publius Suetius P. l. Musicus, a freedman buried at Casilinum during the late first century BC, or early first century AD.
- Suettia Proba, buried at Luceria in Apulia during the first half of the first century, in a sepulchre built by her husband, Lucius Aemilius Speratus, an Apollinaris, or priest of Apollo, and Augustalis.
- Gaius Suettius Blandus, named in a funerary inscription from Puteoli in Campania, dating between AD 1 and 70.
- Suettia Fausta, named in an inscription from Puteoli, dating between AD 1 and 70.
- Gaius Suettius Dama, named in an inscription from Pompeii in Campania, dating from AD 38.
- Sextus Suettius, named in an inscription from Pompeii, dating between AD 30 and 60.
- Aulus Suettius Ephebus, named in an inscription from Pompeii, dating between AD 30 and 60.
- Sextus Suettius Romanus, dedicated a first-century tomb at Rome to his patrons, whose names have not been preserved.
- Suettia Tertia, dedicated four pots at Rome in memory of her husband, the freedman Lucius Mettius Bithus, during the first century.
- Gaius Suettius Damascenus, named in an inscription from Pompeii, dating from AD 61.
- Aulus Suettius Felix, named in an inscription from Pompeii, dating from AD 61.
- Gaius Suettius M[...], named in an inscription from Pompeii, dating from AD 61.
- Lucius Suettius, one of the aediles at Pompeii.
- Aulus Suettius Certus, one of the municipal duumvirs at Pompeii between AD 72 and 74. He was also named in connection with a gladiatorial school.
- Aulus Suettius Partenio, a freedman participating in gladiatorial contests at Puteoli, taking place from the sixteenth to the thirteenth day before the Kalends of April, (Note: From March 17 to March 20.) probably in the late 70s AD.
- Suettius Sabinus, named in an inscription from Pompeii.
- Aulus Suettius Verus, one of the aediles at Pompeii in AD 77 or 78, was duumvir between 76 and 78.
- Servius Suettius Ser. l. Cimber, a freedman who made an offering to Mercury at Casilinum during the first century.
- Lucius Suetius L. l. Amphio, a freedman at Luna in Etruria, who made an offering to Fortuna during the first or second century.
- Suetius, named in an inscription from the Roman fort at Vindolanda in Britannia, dating from AD 102.
- Suettia Iotape, dedicated a second-century tomb at Puteoli to her parents, Minucius Prosdoca and Minucia Euterpe.
- Quintus Suettius Primigenius, along with Quintus Suettius Valens, one of the priests of Apollo at Philippi in Macedonia, during the second century.
- Suettia Psyche, dedicated a second-century tomb at Rome to her husband, Lucius Lucretius Martialis, aged fifty.
- Quintus Suettius Valens, along with Quintus Suettius Primigenius, one of the priests of Apollo at Philippi, during the second century.
- Suettia L. f. Victoria, buried in a second-century tomb at Puteoli, aged twenty-two years, three months, with a monument from her son, Marcianus, and mother, Tryphenia.

=== Undated Suettii ===
- Suettia, the wife of Antigonus, with whom she dedicated a tomb at Rome to their patron, Servius Suettius Demetrius, and the freedman Hermaiscus.
- Suettius, named in an inscription from Aquinum.
- Suetius, named in a pottery inscription from Vicus Augusti in Gallia Narbonensis.
- Sextus Suetius Agathobulus, dedicated a tomb at Rome for his wife, Calvia Marciana, aged thirty.
- Suettia Auge, buried at Rome.
- Servius Suettius Ser. l. Demetrius, a freedman buried at Rome, along with the freedman Hermaiscus, in a tomb dedicated by his clients, Antigonus and Suettia.
- Sextus Suettius Sex. l. Felix, a freedman named in a sepulchral inscription from Rome.
- Suettius L[...]rax, a freedman, together with his wife, Cornelia Procla, dedicated a tomb at Rome to his patron, Sextus Suettius Romanus.
- Gaius Suettius Magnus, made an offering at Berytus in Syria.
- Suettia C. l. Prima, a freedwoman, mentioned in an inscription from Rome, along with the freedman Decimus Junius Philodamus.
- Suettia L. f. Procula, buried at Castellum Fabatianum in Numidia, aged sixty.
- Aulus Suettius Pulcher, named in an inscription from Arva in Hispania Baetica.
- Sextus Suettius Romanus, buried at Rome in a tomb dedicated by his clients, Suettius L[...]rax and Cornelia Procla.
- Suettia Rustica, buried at Rome.
- Suetia Tyndaris, buried at Panormus in Sicilia, aged sixty-one years, one month, and eighteen days.

== See also ==
- List of Roman gentes

== Bibliography ==
- Dictionary of Greek and Roman Biography and Mythology, William Smith, ed., Little, Brown and Company, Boston (1849).
- Theodor Mommsen et alii, Corpus Inscriptionum Latinarum (The Body of Latin Inscriptions, abbreviated CIL), Berlin-Brandenburgische Akademie der Wissenschaften (1853–present).
- René Cagnat et alii, L'Année épigraphique (The Year in Epigraphy, abbreviated AE), Presses Universitaires de France (1888–present).
- August Pauly, Georg Wissowa, et alii, Realencyclopädie der Classischen Altertumswissenschaft (Scientific Encyclopedia of the Knowledge of Classical Antiquities, abbreviated PW), J. B. Metzler, Stuttgart (1894–1980).
- George Davis Chase, "The Origin of Roman Praenomina", in Harvard Studies in Classical Philology, vol. VIII, pp. 103–184 (1897).
- Stéphane Gsell, Inscriptions Latines de L'Algérie (Latin Inscriptions from Algeria, abbreviated ILAlg), Edouard Champion, Paris (1922–present).
- La Carte Archéologique de la Gaule (Archaeological Map of Gaul, abbreviated CAG), Académie des Inscriptions et Belles-Lettres (1931–present).
- Hispania Epigraphica (Epigraphy of Spain, abbreviated HEp), Madrid (1989–present).
- John C. Traupman, The New College Latin & English Dictionary, Bantam Books, New York (1995).
