= Pompeia Plotina =

Roman empress from AD 98 to 117

- Augusta
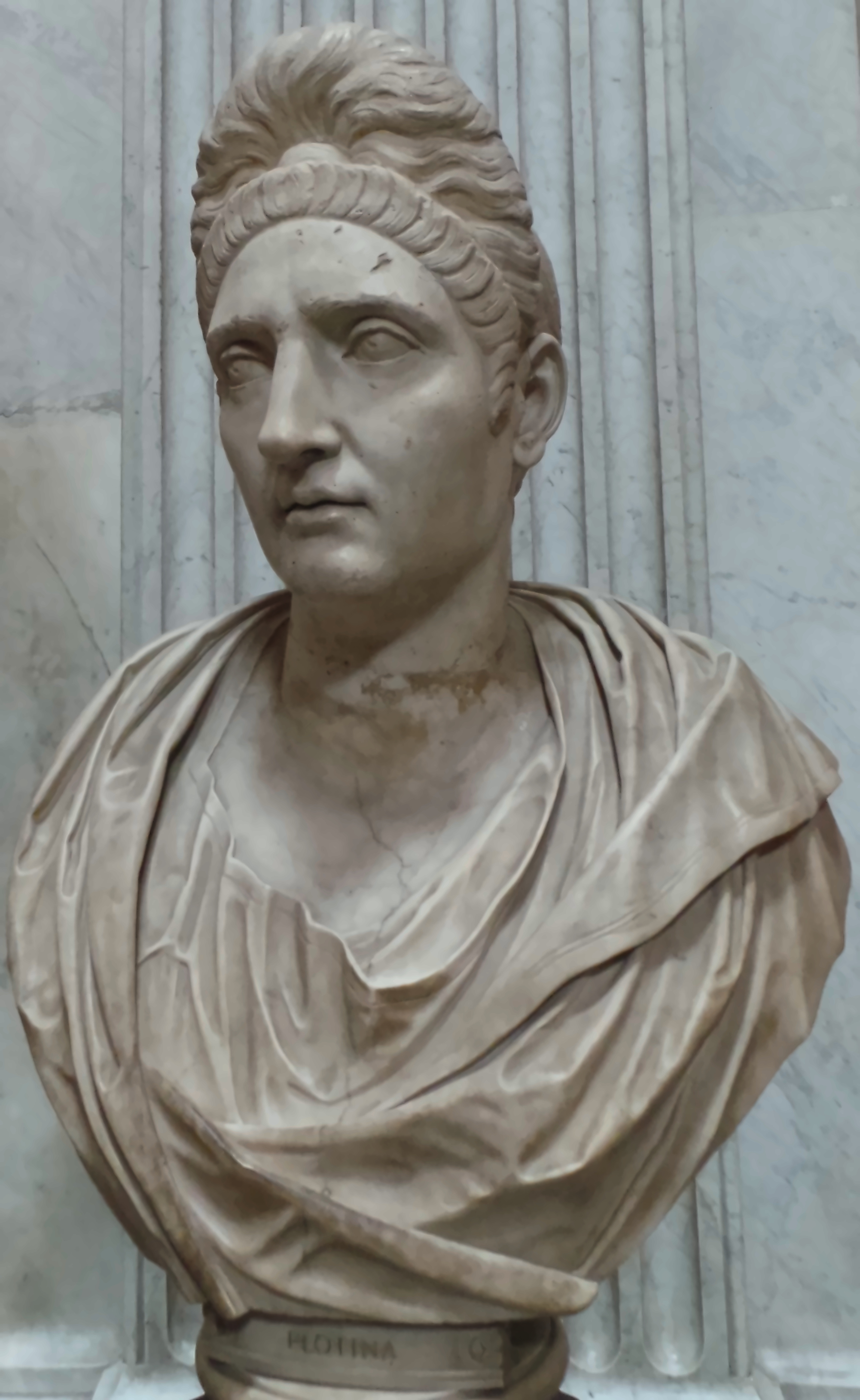
- Bust of Plotina, exhibited in the Vatican Museums.

Roman empress
- Tenure: 98 – 117
- Born: Tejada la Vieja, Hispania or Nemausus, Gaul
- Died: 121/122
- Spouse: Trajan
Regnal name
- Pompeia Plotina Augusta
- Dynasty: Nerva–Antonine
- Father: Lucius Pompeius

Pompeia Plotina (died 121/122) was Roman empress from 98 to 117 as the wife of Trajan. She was renowned for her interest in philosophy, and her virtue, dignity and simplicity. She was particularly devoted to the Epicurean philosophical school in Athens, Greece. She is often viewed as having provided Romans with fairer taxation, improved education, assisted the poor, and created tolerance in Roman society.

== Early life ==
Plotina was raised in Tejada la Vieja (Escacena del Campo) in the province of Hispania (modern Spain). She was possibly born in Nemausus (Nîmes) (southern France) during the reign of the Roman Emperor Nero (r. 54–68), however she could have been born in the 70s.

She was the daughter of Lucius Pompeius. Another woman from Nemausus named Pompeia L. f. Marullina may have been her relative; historian Christian Settipani proposed that they may have been sisters. Based on her cognomen Plotina her mother may have been named Plotia or similar. In Pompeii an inscription names an Ulpia Plotina, (Note: Possibly the same person as Ulpia, the grandmother of Hadrian.) leading to the idea that Pompeia Plotina and Trajan were related. Little is known about Plotina's early life.

== Marriage and life as Empress ==
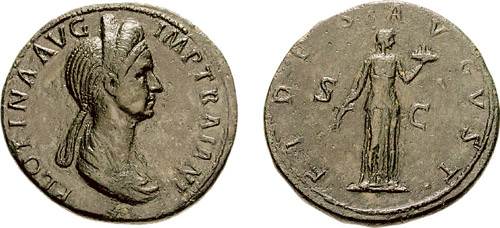
Pompeia Plotina coin, celebrating the Fides on the reverse.

Trajan married Plotina before he became emperor, and their marriage was happy; they had no known children.

Upon entering the imperial palace following Trajan's ascension, Plotina is said to have turned to those watching her and carefully announced, "I enter here the kind of woman I would like to be when I depart." She sought to dispel the memories of the domestic strife that had plagued the reign of Domitian and the Julio-Claudian dynasty. Plotina behaved in the manner of a traditional Roman matron, and she was associated with chaste goddesses such as Vesta (the guardian of Rome's sacred fire) and Minerva (goddess of war and wisdom). In 100, Trajan awarded her with the title of Augusta, but she did not accept the title until 105. Plotina did not appear on coinage until 112.

When the future emperor Hadrian and his sister were 10 or 11 years old, they lost their parents. Trajan and the Roman officer Publius Acilius Attianus became the children's guardians. Hadrian was a first cousin-once-removed to Trajan (Trajan's father and Hadrian's paternal grandmother were siblings). Plotina matched Hadrian with his future wife Vibia Sabina.

== Death of Trajan and accession of Hadrian ==
In 117, Trajan was on his deathbed at Selinus in Cilicia, where he was said to have written a letter in which he personally adopted Hadrian as successor to the Empire. The letter had been signed by the Empress Plotina, and when it arrived in Rome, it was suspect. Rumour named Attianus and Plotina as lovers—the two were very close to their ward Hadrian and the two had been present at Trajan's death—and they were rumoured to have forged Trajan's will to secure Hadrian's succession.

Annelise Freisenbruch dismisses this accusation: "Plotina, the silent spouse of the second century, thus joined Livia, Agrippina the Younger, and Domitia in the gallery of Roman imperial women accused of covering up or conspiring in their husband's deaths." Freisenbruch notes that there are many plausible explanations why Plotina's signature might legitimately be on this declaration: Trajan may have simply been too weak to sign the letter himself. Freisenbruch also notes these kinds of accusations have dogged the spouses of rulers through the centuries.

Along with Attianus and Matidia, the grieving widow Plotina accompanied Trajan's body to Seleucia and his ashes to Rome.

== Later years ==
While Plotina was a widow, her best-documented act took place. During the year 121, while the emperor Hadrian was inspecting the provinces, Plotina engaged him in a series of letters to discuss who should be the new head of the Epicurean school of philosophy in Athens. She petitioned for a change in the law, so that Popillius Theotimus, the acting head of the school, could become the official head; in response, Hadrian agreed with her argument, and the relevant letters were preserved in a series of inscriptions. Freisenbruch notes, "In stark contrast to her passive anonymity in the literary record, this inscription from Athens recasts Plotina as a highly educated woman, active on behalf of causes close to her heart and with the kind of access to the emperor once enjoyed by Livia."

Plotina died of illness, and was deified. Her ashes joined Trajan's in the base of Trajan's Column. In 123, Hadrian built a basilica in her honor at Nîmes, in Provence.

== Nerva–Antonine family tree ==
Nerva–Antonine family tree

Q. Marcius Barea Soranus	Q. Marcius Barea Sura	Antonia Furnilla	M. Cocceius Nerva	Sergia Plautilla	P. Aelius Hadrianus
Titus (r. 79–81)	Marcia Furnilla	Marcia	Trajanus Pater	Nerva (r. 96–98)	Ulpia (Note: Sister of Trajan's father: Giacosa (1977), p. 7.)	Aelius Hadrianus Marullinus
Flavia (Note: Giacosa (1977), p. 8.)	Marciana (Note: Levick (2014), p. 161.)	C. Salonius Matidius (Note: Husband of Ulpia Marciana: Levick (2014), p. 161.)	Trajan (r. 98–117)	Plotina	P. Acilius Attianus	P. Aelius Afer (Note: Giacosa (1977), p. 7.)	Paulina Major (Note: DIR contributor (Herbert W. Benario, 2000), "Hadrian".)
Lucius Mindius (2)	Libo Rupilius Frugi (3)	Salonia Matidia (Note: Giacosa (1977), p. 9.)	L. Vibius Sabinus (1) (Note: Husband of Salonia Matidia: Levick (2014), p. 161.)
Paulina Minor	L. Julius Ursus Servianus (Note: Smith (1870), "Julius Servianus".)
Matidia Minor	Sabina	Hadrian (Note: Smith (1870), "Hadrian", pp. 319–322.) (r. 117–138)	Antinous (Note: Lover of Hadrian: Lambert (1984), p. 99 and passim; deification: Lamber (1984), pp. 2–5, etc.)
C. Fuscus Salinator I	Julia Serviana Paulina
M. Annius Verus (Note: Husband of Rupilia Faustina: Levick (2014), p. 163.)	Rupilia Faustina (Note: Levick (2014), p. 163.) (Note: It is uncertain whether Rupilia Faustina was Frugi's daughter by Salonia Matidia or another woman.)	Boionia Procilla	Cn. Arrius Antoninus
L. Ceionius Commodus	Appia Severa	C. Fuscus Salinator II
L. Caesennius Paetus	Arria Antonina	Arria Fadilla (Note: Levick (2014), p. 162.)	T. Aurelius Fulvus
L. Caesennius Antoninus	L. Commodus	Plautia	unknown (Note: Levick (2014), p. 164.)	C. Avidius Nigrinus
M. Annius Verus	Calvisia Domitia Lucilla (Note: Wife of M. Annius Verus: Giacosa (1977), p. 10.)	Fundania (Note: Wife of M. Annius Libo: Levick (2014), p. 163.)	M. Annius Libo	Faustina	Antoninus Pius (r. 138–161)	L. Aelius Caesar	Avidia
Cornificia	Marcus Aurelius (r. 161–180) (Note: Giacosa (1977), p. 10.)	Faustina Minor	C. Avidius Cassius (Note: The epitomator of Cassius Dio (72.22) gives the story that Faustina the Elder promised to marry Avidius Cassius. This is also echoed in HA "Marcus Aurelius" 24.)	Aurelia Fadilla	Lucius Verus (r. 161–169) (1)	Ceionia Fabia	Plautius Quintillus (Note: Husband of Ceionia Fabia: Levick (2014), p. 164.)	Q. Servilius Pudens	Ceionia Plautia
Cornificia Minor (Note: Levick (2014), p. 117.)	M. Petronius Sura	Commodus (r. 177–192)	Fadilla	M. Annius Verus Caesar	Ti. Claudius Pompeianus (2)	Lucilla	M. Plautius Quintillus	Junius Licinius Balbus	Servilia Ceionia
Petronius Antoninus	L. Aurelius Agaclytus (2)	Aurelia Sabina	L. Antistius Burrus (1)	Plautius Quintillus	Plautia Servilla	C. Furius Sabinus Timesitheus	Maecia Faustina	Junius Licinius Balbus?
Furia Sabinia Tranquillina	Gordian III (r. 238–244)

- (1) = 1st spouse
- (2) = 2nd spouse
- (3) = 3rd spouse
- Reddish-purple indicates emperor of the Nerva–Antonine dynasty
  lighter purple indicates designated imperial heir of said dynasty who never reigned
  grey indicates unsuccessful imperial aspirants
  bluish-purple indicates emperors of other dynasties
- dashed lines indicate adoption; dotted lines indicate love affairs/unmarried relationships
- Small Caps = posthumously deified (Augusti, Augustae, or other)

Notes:

Except where otherwise noted, the notes below indicate that an individual's parentage is as shown in the above family tree.

References:
- DIR contributors (2000). "De Imperatoribus Romanis: An Online Encyclopedia of Roman Rulers and Their Families".
- Giacosa, Giorgio (1977). Women of the Caesars: Their Lives and Portraits on Coins. Translated by Holloway, R. Ross. Milan: Edizioni Arte e Moneta. ISBN 0-8390-0193-2.
- Lambert, Royston (1984). Beloved and God: The Story of Hadrian and Antinous. New York: Viking. ISBN 0-670-15708-2.
- Levick, Barbara (2014). Faustina I and II: Imperial Women of the Golden Age. Oxford University Press. ISBN 978-0-19-537941-9.
- Smith, William, ed. (1870). Dictionary of Greek and Roman Biography and Mythology.
