= Optatus (given name) =

Optatus or Opatat was a common given name in the Roman times. Its etymology is probably derived from the Roman religion.

== People with the name ==
- Optatus of Carthage
- Optatus of Thamugadai
- Optatus of Vescera
