= Salonia Matidia =

Niece of Roman emperor Trajan (68-119)

Diva Salonia Matidia Augusta
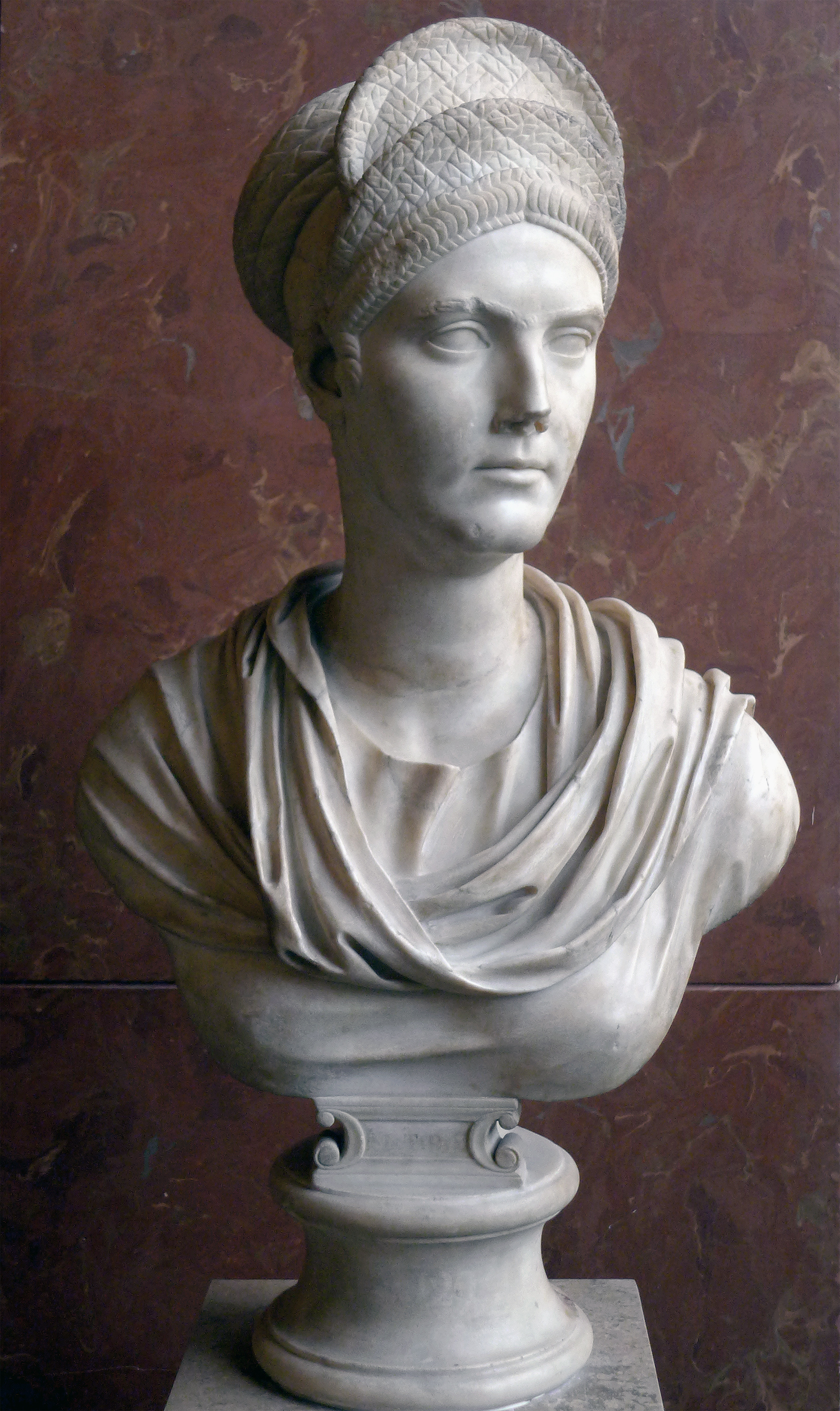
- Bust of Matidia, Louvre
- Born: 4 July 68
- Died: 23 December 119
- Monuments: Temple of Matidia
- Known for: niece of Trajan and mother-in-law of Hadrian
- Spouses: Lucius Vibius Sabinus (m. 81/82; died 83/84); Lucius Mindius (m. 84; died 85); Libo Rupilius Frugi (m. 86; died 101)
- Children: Vibia Sabina; Mindia Matidia
- Parents: Gaius Salonius Matidius Patruinus (father); Ulpia Marciana (mother)
- Family: Nerva–Antonine dynasty

Salonia Matidia (4 July 68 – 23 December 119) was the daughter and only child of Ulpia Marciana and wealthy praetor Gaius Salonius Matidius Patruinus. Her maternal uncle was the Roman emperor Trajan. Trajan had no children and treated her like his daughter. Her father died in 78 and Matidia went with her mother to live with Trajan and his wife, Pompeia Plotina.

== Life ==
Between 81 and 82, Matidia married a suffect consul and former proconsul Lucius Vibius Sabinus. Sabinus died in 83 or 84. Matidia bore Sabinus a daughter called Vibia Sabina, who would marry the future Roman Emperor Hadrian. Matidia was very fond of her second cousin Hadrian and allowed him to marry Vibia Sabina.

In 84, Matidia married for a second time to an otherwise unknown Roman aristocrat called Lucius Mindius. Matidia bore Mindius a daughter called Mindia Matidia, commonly known as Matidia Minor. Mindius died in 85.

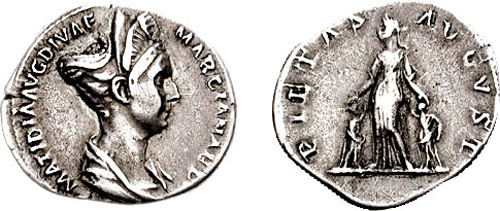
Denarius showing Matidia Augusta as the goddess Pietas, holding hands with her daughters Sabina and Matidia Minor

Matidia later married Lucius Scribonius Libo Rupilius Frugi Bonus, who was suffect consul in 88. Frugi had a daughter called Rupilia Faustina from an earlier marriage. Faustina would go on to marry the Roman Senator Marcus Annius Verus, their daughter became empress Faustina the Elder and their son Marcus Annius Verus's son became emperor Marcus Aurelius.

Matidia often traveled with her uncle and assisted him with decision-making. Like her mother, Matidia was honored with monuments and inscriptions in her name throughout the Roman Empire. On 29 August 112, she received the title of Augusta upon the death and divinization of Marciana.

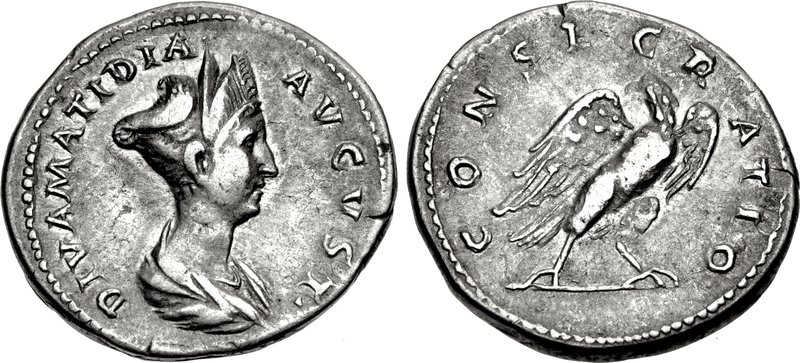
Denarius depicting Matidia; the reverse, depicting an eagle with the legend CONSECRATIO, commemorates her consecration as a diva

When Trajan died in 117, Matidia and Plotina brought the emperor's ashes back to Rome. In 119 Matidia died, whereupon the Roman Emperor Hadrian delivered her funeral oration, deified her, and granted her a temple and altar in Rome itself. She thus became the first divinized Roman woman to be dedicated a full-scale temple of her own, as opposed to one shared with her husband or a smaller shrine.

== Nerva–Antonine family tree ==
Nerva–Antonine family tree

Q. Marcius Barea Soranus	Q. Marcius Barea Sura	Antonia Furnilla	M. Cocceius Nerva	Sergia Plautilla	P. Aelius Hadrianus
Titus (r. 79–81)	Marcia Furnilla	Marcia	Trajanus Pater	Nerva (r. 96–98)	Ulpia (Note: Sister of Trajan's father: Giacosa (1977), p. 7.)	Aelius Hadrianus Marullinus
Flavia (Note: Giacosa (1977), p. 8.)	Marciana (Note: Levick (2014), p. 161.)	C. Salonius Matidius (Note: Husband of Ulpia Marciana: Levick (2014), p. 161.)	Trajan (r. 98–117)	Plotina	P. Acilius Attianus	P. Aelius Afer (Note: Giacosa (1977), p. 7.)	Paulina Major (Note: DIR contributor (Herbert W. Benario, 2000), "Hadrian".)
Lucius Mindius (2)	Libo Rupilius Frugi (3)	Salonia Matidia (Note: Giacosa (1977), p. 9.)	L. Vibius Sabinus (1) (Note: Husband of Salonia Matidia: Levick (2014), p. 161.)
Paulina Minor	L. Julius Ursus Servianus (Note: Smith (1870), "Julius Servianus".)
Matidia Minor	Sabina	Hadrian (Note: Smith (1870), "Hadrian", pp. 319–322.) (r. 117–138)	Antinous (Note: Lover of Hadrian: Lambert (1984), p. 99 and passim; deification: Lamber (1984), pp. 2–5, etc.)
C. Fuscus Salinator I	Julia Serviana Paulina
M. Annius Verus (Note: Husband of Rupilia Faustina: Levick (2014), p. 163.)	Rupilia Faustina (Note: Levick (2014), p. 163.) (Note: It is uncertain whether Rupilia Faustina was Frugi's daughter by Salonia Matidia or another woman.)	Boionia Procilla	Cn. Arrius Antoninus
L. Ceionius Commodus	Appia Severa	C. Fuscus Salinator II
L. Caesennius Paetus	Arria Antonina	Arria Fadilla (Note: Levick (2014), p. 162.)	T. Aurelius Fulvus
L. Caesennius Antoninus	L. Commodus	Plautia	unknown (Note: Levick (2014), p. 164.)	C. Avidius Nigrinus
M. Annius Verus	Calvisia Domitia Lucilla (Note: Wife of M. Annius Verus: Giacosa (1977), p. 10.)	Fundania (Note: Wife of M. Annius Libo: Levick (2014), p. 163.)	M. Annius Libo	Faustina	Antoninus Pius (r. 138–161)	L. Aelius Caesar	Avidia
Cornificia	Marcus Aurelius (r. 161–180) (Note: Giacosa (1977), p. 10.)	Faustina Minor	C. Avidius Cassius (Note: The epitomator of Cassius Dio (72.22) gives the story that Faustina the Elder promised to marry Avidius Cassius. This is also echoed in HA "Marcus Aurelius" 24.)	Aurelia Fadilla	Lucius Verus (r. 161–169) (1)	Ceionia Fabia	Plautius Quintillus (Note: Husband of Ceionia Fabia: Levick (2014), p. 164.)	Q. Servilius Pudens	Ceionia Plautia
Cornificia Minor (Note: Levick (2014), p. 117.)	M. Petronius Sura	Commodus (r. 177–192)	Fadilla	M. Annius Verus Caesar	Ti. Claudius Pompeianus (2)	Lucilla	M. Plautius Quintillus	Junius Licinius Balbus	Servilia Ceionia
Petronius Antoninus	L. Aurelius Agaclytus (2)	Aurelia Sabina	L. Antistius Burrus (1)	Plautius Quintillus	Plautia Servilla	C. Furius Sabinus Timesitheus	Maecia Faustina	Junius Licinius Balbus?
Furia Sabinia Tranquillina	Gordian III (r. 238–244)

- (1) = 1st spouse
- (2) = 2nd spouse
- (3) = 3rd spouse
- Reddish-purple indicates emperor of the Nerva–Antonine dynasty
  lighter purple indicates designated imperial heir of said dynasty who never reigned
  grey indicates unsuccessful imperial aspirants
  bluish-purple indicates emperors of other dynasties
- dashed lines indicate adoption; dotted lines indicate love affairs/unmarried relationships
- Small Caps = posthumously deified (Augusti, Augustae, or other)

Notes:

Except where otherwise noted, the notes below indicate that an individual's parentage is as shown in the above family tree.

References:
- Giacosa, Giorgio (1977). Women of the Caesars: Their Lives and Portraits on Coins. Translated by Holloway, R. Ross. Milan: Edizioni Arte e Moneta. ISBN 0-8390-0193-2.
- Lambert, Royston (1984). Beloved and God: The Story of Hadrian and Antinous. New York: Viking. ISBN 0-670-15708-2.
- Levick, Barbara (2014). Faustina I and II: Imperial Women of the Golden Age. Oxford University Press. ISBN 978-0-19-537941-9.
- Smith, William, ed. (1870). Dictionary of Greek and Roman Biography and Mythology.
