= Marcia (mother of Trajan) =

Mother of Roman emperor Trajan

Marcia Furnilla (c. 29 – before 100) was a Roman noblewoman and the mother of the Roman emperor Trajan.

== Family ==
Marcia came from a noble and politically influential gens, the plebeian gens Marcia, which claimed to be descended from the Roman king Ancus Marcius. Trajan owned some lands called Figlinae Marcianae in Ameria, believed to be the place where Marcia's family was from. Marcia was a daughter of the Roman senator Quintus Marcius Barea Sura and his wife Antonia Furnilla. Quintus Marcius Barea Sura was a friend to emperor Vespasian. Her younger sister Marcia Furnilla was the second wife of emperor Titus. Marcia was a maternal aunt to Furnilla's and Titus' daughter Flavia.

Marcia's paternal uncle was the senator Quintus Marcius Barea Soranus, while her paternal cousin was the noblewoman Marcia Servilia Sorana. Marcia's paternal grandfather was Quintus Marcius Barea, who was suffect consul in 34 and Proconsul of the Africa Province in 41–43, while her maternal grandfather could have been Aulus Antonius Rufus, a suffect consul in 45. The gens of Marcia was connected to the opponents of emperor Nero. In 65 after the failure of the Pisonian conspiracy, her family was disfavored by Nero.

== Life ==
During the reign of emperor Claudius (r. 41–54), Marcia married the Roman general and senator Marcus Ulpius Traianus. Traianus originally came from Italica (near modern Seville, Spain) in the Roman province of Hispania Baetica. After Marcia married Traianus, for a time they lived in Italica.

Marcia bore Traianus two children:

- A daughter - Ulpia Marciana (48–112/114), who inherited her second name from her mother's paternal ancestry. Marciana married Gaius Salonius Matidius Patruinus, who was a wealthy senator and became praetor. Marciana bore Patruinus a daughter named Salonia Matidia, who was born in 68.
- A son - Marcus Ulpius Traianus, better known as Trajan (53–117). Trajan became and served as emperor from 98 until his death in 117. He married a woman named Pompeia Plotina.

Marcia owned clay-bearing estates called the Figlinae Marcianae, which was located in North Italy. When Marcia died, Trajan inherited these estates from his mother. It is unknown if Marcia lived long enough to see Trajan become emperor.

== Legacy ==
Around 100, her son Trajan founded a colony in North Africa which was called Colonia Marciana Ulpia Traiana Thamugadi (modern Timgad, Algeria). Her son named this town in honor of her, her late husband and her daughter. The colony's name is also a tribute in honoring her family.

== Nerva–Antonine family tree ==
Nerva–Antonine family tree

Q. Marcius Barea Soranus | Q. Marcius Barea Sura | Antonia Furnilla | M. Cocceius Nerva | Sergia Plautilla | P. Aelius Hadrianus
Titus (r. 79–81) | Marcia Furnilla | Marcia | Trajanus Pater | Nerva (r. 96–98) | Ulpia (Note: Sister of Trajan's father: Giacosa (1977), p. 7.) | Aelius Hadrianus Marullinus
Flavia (Note: Giacosa (1977), p. 8.) | Marciana (Note: Levick (2014), p. 161.) | C. Salonius Matidius (Note: Husband of Ulpia Marciana: Levick (2014), p. 161.) | Trajan (r. 98–117) | Plotina | P. Acilius Attianus | P. Aelius Afer (Note: Giacosa (1977), p. 7.) | Paulina Major (Note: DIR contributor (Herbert W. Benario, 2000), "Hadrian".)
Lucius Mindius (2) | Libo Rupilius Frugi (3) | Salonia Matidia (Note: Giacosa (1977), p. 9.) | L. Vibius Sabinus (1) (Note: Husband of Salonia Matidia: Levick (2014), p. 161.)
Paulina Minor | L. Julius Ursus Servianus (Note: Smith (1870), "Julius Servianus".)
Matidia Minor | Sabina | Hadrian (Note: Smith (1870), "Hadrian", pp. 319–322.) (r. 117–138) | Antinous (Note: Lover of Hadrian: Lambert (1984), p. 99 and passim; deification: Lamber (1984), pp. 2–5, etc.)
C. Fuscus Salinator I | Julia Serviana Paulina
M. Annius Verus (Note: Husband of Rupilia Faustina: Levick (2014), p. 163.) | Rupilia Faustina (Note: Levick (2014), p. 163.) (Note: It is uncertain whether Rupilia Faustina was Frugi's daughter by Salonia Matidia or another woman.) | Boionia Procilla | Cn. Arrius Antoninus
L. Ceionius Commodus | Appia Severa | C. Fuscus Salinator II
L. Caesennius Paetus | Arria Antonina | Arria Fadilla (Note: Levick (2014), p. 162.) | T. Aurelius Fulvus
L. Caesennius Antoninus | L. Commodus | Plautia | unknown (Note: Levick (2014), p. 164.) | C. Avidius Nigrinus
M. Annius Verus | Calvisia Domitia Lucilla (Note: Wife of M. Annius Verus: Giacosa (1977), p. 10.) | Fundania (Note: Wife of M. Annius Libo: Levick (2014), p. 163.) | M. Annius Libo | Faustina | Antoninus Pius (r. 138–161) | L. Aelius Caesar | Avidia
Cornificia | Marcus Aurelius (r. 161–180) (Note: Giacosa (1977), p. 10.) | Faustina Minor | C. Avidius Cassius (Note: The epitomator of Cassius Dio (72.22) gives the story that Faustina the Elder promised to marry Avidius Cassius. This is also echoed in HA "Marcus Aurelius" 24.) | Aurelia Fadilla | Lucius Verus (r. 161–169) (1) | Ceionia Fabia | Plautius Quintillus (Note: Husband of Ceionia Fabia: Levick (2014), p. 164.) | Q. Servilius Pudens | Ceionia Plautia
Cornificia Minor (Note: Levick (2014), p. 117.) | M. Petronius Sura | Commodus (r. 177–192) | Fadilla | M. Annius Verus Caesar | Ti. Claudius Pompeianus (2) | Lucilla | M. Plautius Quintillus | Junius Licinius Balbus | Servilia Ceionia
Petronius Antoninus | L. Aurelius Agaclytus (2) | Aurelia Sabina | L. Antistius Burrus (1) | Plautius Quintillus | Plautia Servilla | C. Furius Sabinus Timesitheus | Maecia Faustina | Junius Licinius Balbus?
Furia Sabinia Tranquillina | Gordian III (r. 238–244)

- (1) = 1st spouse
- (2) = 2nd spouse
- (3) = 3rd spouse
- Reddish-purple indicates emperor of the Nerva–Antonine dynasty
  lighter purple indicates designated imperial heir of said dynasty who never reigned
  grey indicates unsuccessful imperial aspirants
  bluish-purple indicates emperors of other dynasties
- dashed lines indicate adoption; dotted lines indicate love affairs/unmarried relationships
- Small Caps = posthumously deified (Augusti, Augustae, or other)

Notes:

Except where otherwise noted, the notes below indicate that an individual's parentage is as shown in the above family tree.

References:
- Giacosa, Giorgio (1977). Women of the Caesars: Their Lives and Portraits on Coins. Translated by Holloway, R. Ross. Milan: Edizioni Arte e Moneta. ISBN 0-8390-0193-2.
- Lambert, Royston (1984). Beloved and God: The Story of Hadrian and Antinous. New York: Viking. ISBN 0-670-15708-2.
- Levick, Barbara (2014). Faustina I and II: Imperial Women of the Golden Age. Oxford University Press. ISBN 978-0-19-537941-9.
- Smith, William, ed. (1870). Dictionary of Greek and Roman Biography and Mythology.

== See also ==
- Women in ancient Rome

== Sources ==
- The Trial of P. Egnatius Celer on JSTOR
- Roman Emperors - DIR Trajan
- Roman Emperors DIR Roman legions
- WebCite query result
- The Cambridge Ancient History
