= Temple of Matidia =

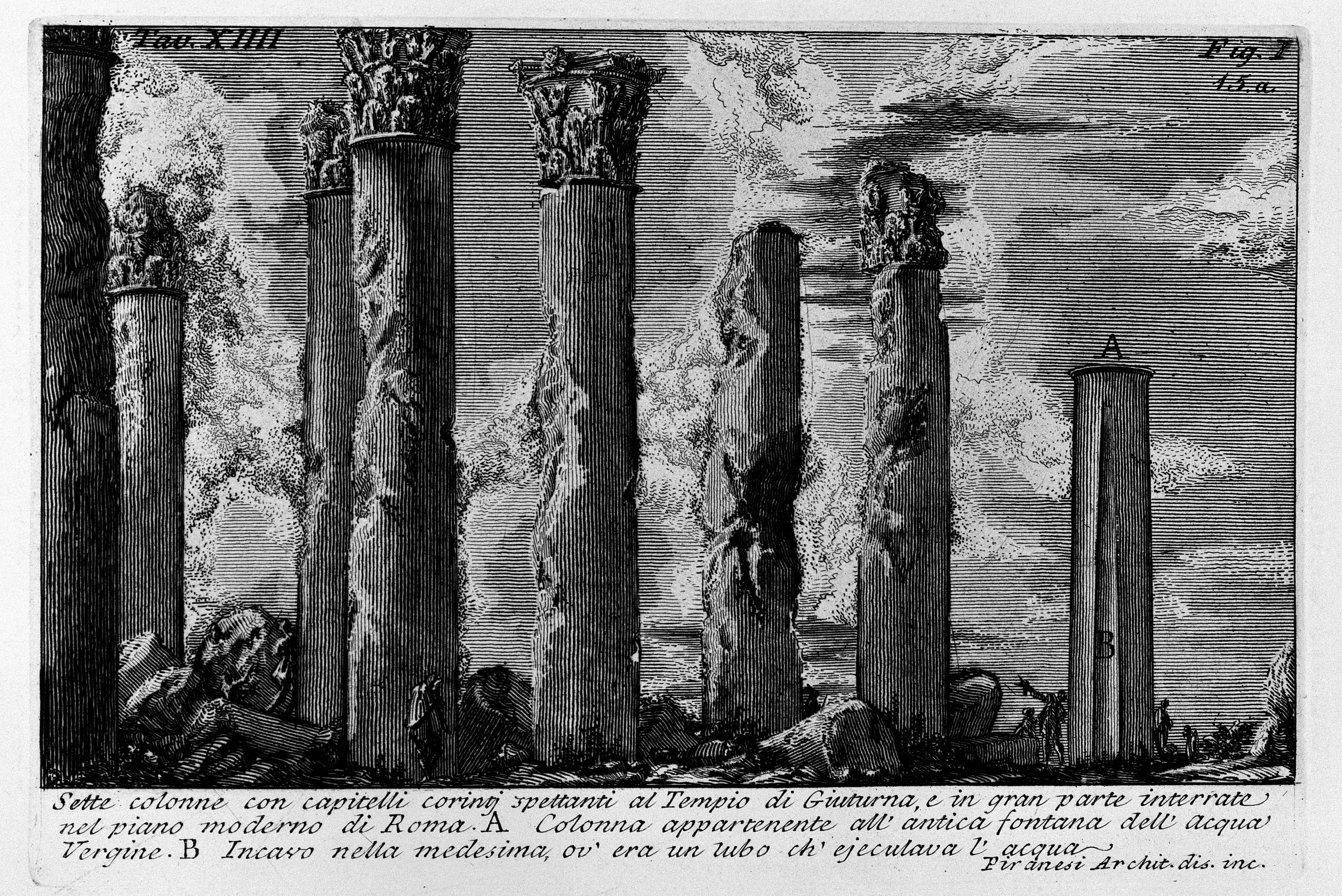
18th century engraving of columns, possibly from the Temple of Matidia.

The Temple of Matidia was a Roman temple on the Campus Martius in ancient Rome dedicated to Salonia Matidia, who was deified after her death in 119 by her son-in-law Hadrian. He began construction immediately after her deification, choosing a site near the Pantheon and the Saepta Julia, both of which he restored or rebuilt. A lead water pipe inscribed 'templo matidiae' ('from the temple of Matidia') was found near Sant'Ignazio, which may indicate the temple's location. After Hadrian died and was deified, his own temple was built next to that of Matidia.

== See also ==
- List of Ancient Roman temples

== Bibliography ==
- L. Richardson, jr, A New Topographical Dictionary of Ancient Rome, Baltimore - London 1992. pp. 246–247 ISBN 0801843006
- F. Coarelli, Rome and environs - an archeological guide, Berkeley 2007. pp. 291–292 ISBN 9780520079618
