= Traia gens =

Ancient Roman family

The gens Traia was an obscure plebeian family at ancient Rome. No members of this gens are mentioned by Roman writers, but several are known from inscriptions.

== Origin ==
The nomen Traius belongs to a large class of gentilicia formed using the suffix -aius, which was typical of Oscan names. Epigraphy places some of the Traii in Samnium, an Oscan-speaking region of Italy.

== Praenomina ==
All of the Traii known from inscriptions bore very common praenomina, including Lucius, Gaius, Marcus, and Quintus.

== Branches and cognomina ==
A family of this gens settled in Hispania by the Augustan era, where they achieved some local importance at Italica and Arva in Baetica. Gaius Traius Pollio was one of the duumvirs at Italica, while Quintus Traius Areianus was honoured with a statue at Arva. The cognomen Pollio was an old Latin surname originally derived from the occupation of the bearer, indicating a polisher. Areianus, which belonged to at least two generations of the family from Arva, probably commemorated their descent from the Areia gens. Similarly, the surname Trajanus, borne by a family of the Ulpia gens from Tuder in Umbria, probably recorded their descent from the Traii, some of whom lived at Tuder. The emperor Trajan was descended from a branch of this family that settled in Hispania, as did some of the Traii. The surname is found with Lucius Blattius Trajanus Pollio, colleague of the duumvir Gaius Traius Pollio; his surnames seem to indicate that he was likewise descended from the Traii Polliones.

== Members ==
This list includes abbreviated praenomina. For an explanation of this practice, see filiation.

- Traia, a woman named in a pottery inscription from Rome.
- Gaius Traius, named in a sepulchral inscription from Italica in Hispania Baetica.
- Marcus Traius M. f., named in an inscription from Tuder in Umbria.
- Lucius Traius Adjutor, buried at the site of modern Pesco Sannita, formerly part of Samnium, in a tomb built by Tituleia Felicissima, his wife of twenty-five years.
- Quintus Traius Areianus, father of the Areianus honoured at Arva in Hispania Baetica, was probably the husband of Aemilia Lucilla, and the father or stepfather of Sergius Rufinus.
- Quintus Traius Q. f. Areianus, honoured with a sepulchre and statue at Arva, dedicated by his mother, Aemilia Lucilla, and brother, Sergius Rufinus.
- Lucius Traius L. f. Honoratus, dedicated a tomb at Ligures Baebiani in Samnium for his mother, Quintia Phoebas.
- Gaius Traius Logismus, together with Quartula Cantria, perhaps his wife, dedicated a tomb at Corduba in Hispania Baetica, dating from the middle part of the first century, for Faustus, probably their child, aged seven months.
- Gaius Traius C. f. Pollio, designated one of the municipal duumvirs of Italica, along with Lucius Blattius Trajanus Pollio, probably his relative, in an Augustan-era inscription.
- Marcus Traius Samacius Dualius, a youth buried at the site of modern Zarza de Granadilla, formerly part of Lusitania, aged fifteen.

== See also ==
- List of Roman gentes

== Bibliography ==
- Theodor Mommsen et alii, Corpus Inscriptionum Latinarum (The Body of Latin Inscriptions, abbreviated CIL), Berlin-Brandenburgische Akademie der Wissenschaften (1853–present).
- René Cagnat et alii, L'Année épigraphique (The Year in Epigraphy, abbreviated AE), Presses Universitaires de France (1888–present).
- George Davis Chase, "The Origin of Roman Praenomina", in Harvard Studies in Classical Philology, vol. VIII, pp. 103–184 (1897).
- Hispania Epigraphica (Epigraphy of Spain), Madrid (1989–present).
