= Ulpius Marcellus (jurist) =

2nd-century Roman jurist-consultant and writer

Ulpius Marcellus was a Roman Equestrian and member of the gens Ulpia. He was a lawyer from Asia Minor. It is possible he was an advisor to Antoninus Pius and Marcus Aurelius. Marcellus also wrote several books. The jurist Ulpius Marcellus could be the same as the legate Ulpius Marcellus or the governor of Britannia.

== Biography ==
He was a lawyer of either freedman or provincial status from Asia Minor. It is possible he was an advisor to Antoninus Pius and Marcus Aurelius. However, the lateness of his time and him not being an advisor to Hadrian indicate that he most likely was not an advisor. Marcellus may also have been a legate and pro-praetor in Pannonia Inferior sometime between 105 and 180 CE. Or the governor of Britannia from 161 to 169 CE. In 158 CE, Ulpius may have become Consul. He wrote at least five books: On the Duties of the Consul, Consultative Opinions, Cervidius Scaevola, and 31 of the Digesta. He also published notes on Julianus's books criticizing some of his innovations.
