= Arch of Trajan (Timgad) =

Coordinates: 35°29′6.2″N 6°28′1″E

- Timgad
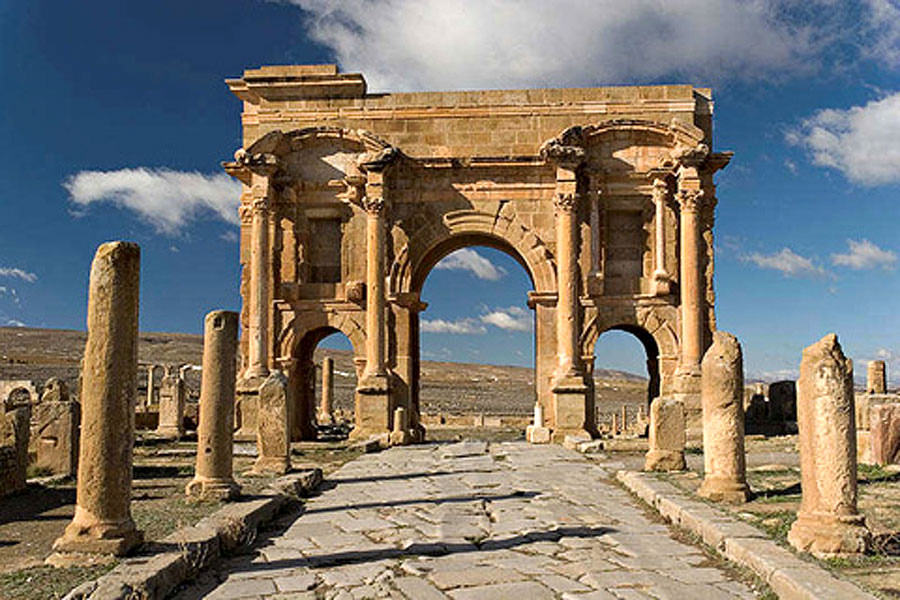
- Location: Timgad, Batna, Algeria
- Type: Roman triumphal arch
- Completion date: c. 100 AD
- Dedicated to: Emperor Trajan

The Arch of Trajan is a Roman triumphal arch located in the city of Timgad (ancient Thamugadi), near Batna, Algeria. It was built between the later 2nd century and the early 3rd century.

The three vaulted arch composed the western gate of the city, at the beginning of the Decumanus Maximus and the end of the road coming from Lambaesis.

== History ==
The inscription on the attic records the foundation of the colony on the part of Trajan in the year 100. The decorative fabric of the monument, with the sides of the lateral arches detached from the wall, was taken with a curvilinear pediment that forms two protruding and strongly contrasted lateral aediculae. This and the lavish decoration of the architectural elements, all suggest a later dating.

The arch together with the whole archaeological site of Timgad, has been listed as a World Heritage Site by UNESCO since 1982.

== Description ==
The arch reaches a height of 12 metres, with a central arch of 6 metres in height which permitted the passage of vehicles that have left deep ruts in the ground under the archway. The lateral arches, each 3.75 metres high, were reserved for pedestrians.

Above the lateral arches on both sides are deep rectangular niches, which are flanked by aediculae with smooth-stemmed Corinthian columns of coloured marble on shelves. The niches were designed to hold statues, which are now lost. The whole assemblage of each lateral arch and niche was framed by two red Corinthian columns, detached from the walls and supported by pedestals. The entablature that runs across the wall above the lateral arches protrudes above the columns, and a curvilinear pediment rests on it in turn. The attic must have been surmounted with a group of monumental statues.

Other sculpture was added to the arch in later times. This includes a statue of the gods Mars and one of Concordia erected under Emperor Septimius Severus by Lucius Licinius Optatianus, on the occasion of his election as flamen-for-life of the colonia.

== See also ==
- List of Roman triumphal arches

== Bibliography ==
- John Bryan Ward Perkins, Etruscan and Roman Architecture, London 1970, pp. 482– 484
- Pietro Romanelli, "L'arco di Traiano a Timgad: una ipotesi", in Mélanges d'histoire ancienne et d'archéologie offerts à Paul Collart, Losanna 1976, pp. 317–321.
- Elizabeth Fentress, "Thamugadi" in Enciclopedia dell'arte antica, II supplemento, 1997 (online on the website Treccani.it
