= Timgad =

Roman ruins in Algeria

- تيمقاد (Arabic)
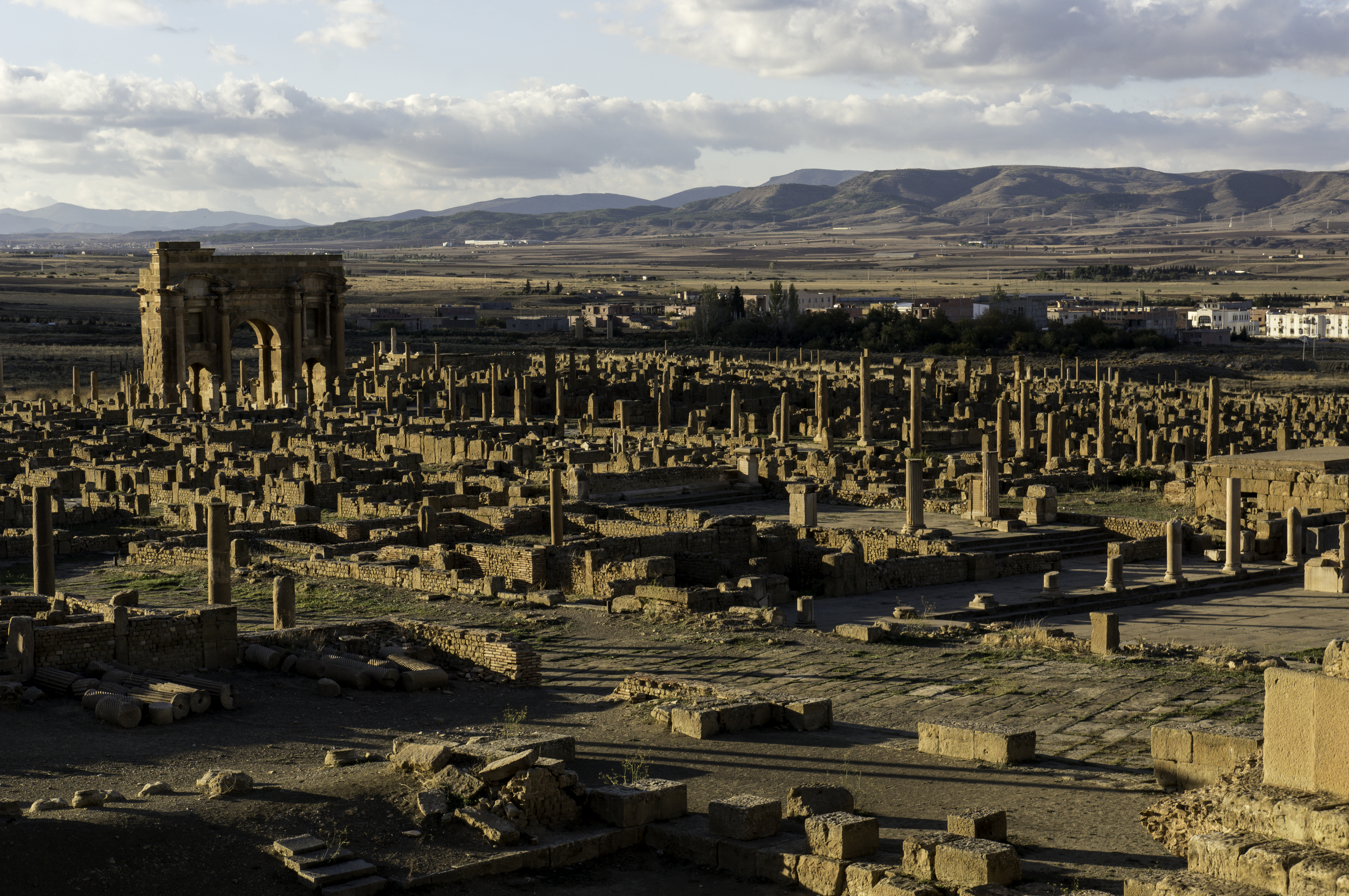
- The Roman ruins of Timgad

- Location within Algeria
- 35°29′03″N 6°28′07″E
- Type: Settlement
- Periods: Roman Empire
- Location: Batna Province, Algeria
- Region: Maghreb

History
- Built: 100 CE
- Abandoned: 7th century

UNESCO World Heritage Site
- Official name: Timgad
- Type: Cultural
- Criteria: ii, iii, iv
- Designated: 1982 (6th session)
- Reference no.: 194
- Region: Arab States

Timgad or Thamugadi (Arabic: تيمقاد, romanized: Tīmqād) nicknamed the "Pompeii of North Africa", was a Roman city in the Aurès Mountains of Algeria. It was founded by the Roman Emperor Trajan around 100 CE. The full name of the city was Colonia Marciana Ulpia Traiana Thamugadi. Emperor Trajan named the city in commemoration of his mother Marcia, eldest sister Ulpia Marciana, and father Marcus Ulpius Traianus.

Timgad is Located in modern-day Algeria, about 35 km (22 mi) east of the city of Batna.

The ruins are noteworthy for representing one of the best extant examples of the grid plan as used in Roman town planning.

In 1982, UNESCO inscribed Timgad as a World Heritage Site.

== Name ==
The former name of Timgad was Marciana Traiana Thamugadi. The first part, Marciana Traiana, is Roman and refers to the name of its founder, Emperor Trajan, and his sister, Marciana.

The second part of the name, Thamugadi, "has nothing Latin about it". Thamugadi is the Berber name of the site on which the city was built, being the plural form of Tamgut, meaning "peak" or "summit".

== History ==
In the year 100 CE, the emperor Trajan founded the city as a Colonia. It was intended to serve primarily as a Roman bastion against the Berbers in the nearby Aures Mountains. It was originally populated largely by Roman veterans and colonists.

Despite its cultural and geographic distance from Rome, which most of its residents had never seen, Timgad invested heavily in Roman culture and identity.

Starting in the 3rd century, having enjoyed a peaceful existence over the decades from its founding, the city became a center of Christian activity, as well as a Donatist center in the 4th century.

At the end of the 4th century, during the Christian period, the diocese of Timgad enjoyed renown when Bishop Optat became the spokesman for the Donatist movement. After the time of Optat (i.e., Optatus), Thamugadai (i.e., Timgad) had two more bishops: Gaudentius (Donatist); and Faustinus (Catholic).

In the 5th century CE, the city began falling into decline when it was sacked by the Vandals. Timgad was destroyed at the end of the 5th century by Berber tribes from the Aurès Mountains.

In 539 CE, during the Moorish wars, the Byzantine general Solomon retook and rebuilt the city, incorporating it into Byzantine North Africa. The reconquest revived some activities in the city, which became part of a line of defense against the Moors.

By the 8th century, Thamugadi (i.e., Timgud) ceased to be inhabited, as the early Muslim conquests of the 7th century ultimately led to its final ruin.

On 12 December 1765, while traveling in Northern Africa, Scottish explorer James Bruce reached the city ruins, likely having been the first European to visit the site in centuries. He described the city as "a small town, but full of elegant buildings".

In 1790, Bruce published the book Travels to Discover the Source of the Nile (1790), where he described what he had found in Timgad, but the book was met with skepticism in Great Britain.

In 1875, Bruce's account gained new traction when Robert Lambert Playfair, Britain's consul in Algiers, inspired by Bruce's account, visited the site. Playfair described Timgad in more detail in his book Travels in the Footsteps of Bruce in Algeria and Tunis (1877). According to Playfair: "These hills are covered with countless numbers of the most interesting mega-lithic remains."

In 1881, French colonists took control of the site. They began investigations and maintained it until 1960. During this period, the site was systematically excavated.

In the 1880s, the Ministry of Public Education and Fine Arts decided to begin excavations in Timgad, creating a post of chief architect of historical monuments of Algeria, with the aim of managing the service of historical monuments of Algeria and taking care of the excavation and restoration sites.

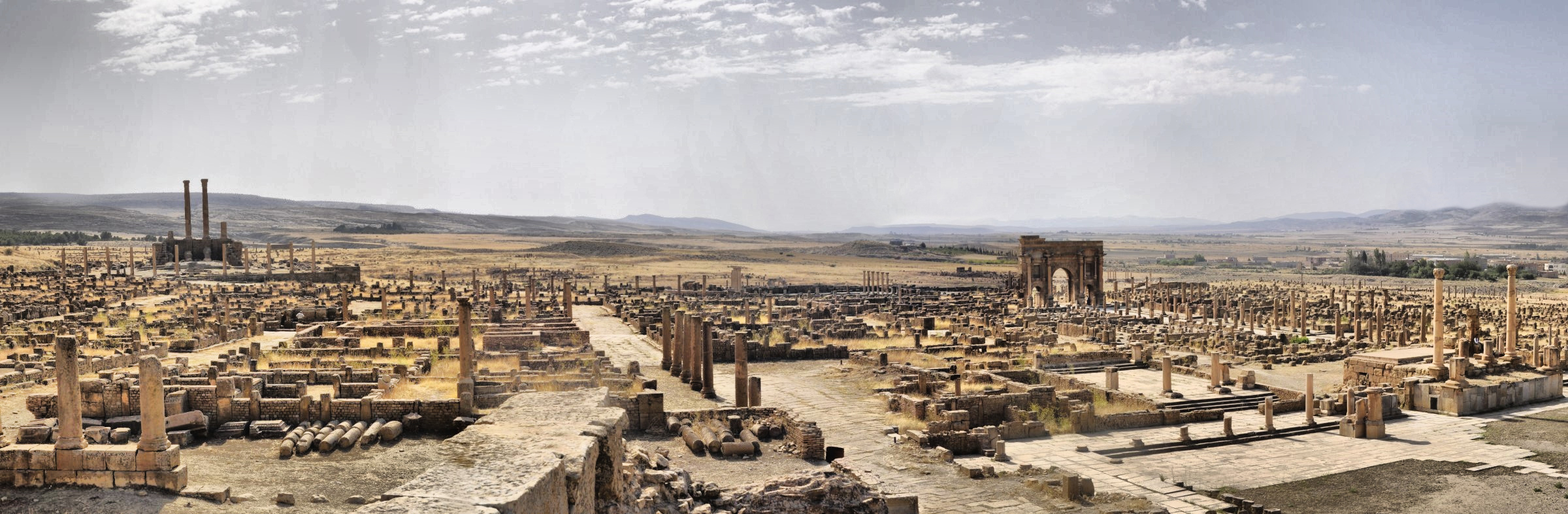
Panorama of Timgad ruins

== Geography ==
Map of the Archeological site

Located at the intersection of six roads, the city was walled but not fortified. Originally designed for a population of around 15,000, the city quickly outgrew its original plans and spilled beyond the orthogonal grid in a more loosely organized fashion.

At the time of its founding (c. 100 CE), the area surrounding the city was a fertile agricultural area, about 1,000 meters (1.0 km; 3,300 ft; 0.62 mi) above sea level. The original Roman grid plan is magnificently visible in the orthogonal design, highlighted by the decumanus maximus (east–west-oriented street) and the cardo (north–south-oriented street) lined by a partially restored Corinthian colonnade. The cardo does not proceed completely through the city but instead terminates in a forum at the intersection with the decumanus.

The Arch of Trajan, also known as the Timgad Arch, rises at the west end of the decumanus. The arch is a 12-meter (39 ft) triumphal arch and is principally of sandstone. It is of the Corinthian order with three arches, the central one being 11 ft (3.4 m) wide. The arch was partially restored in 1900.

A 3,500-seat theater is in good condition and is used for contemporary productions. The other key buildings include four thermae, a library, and a basilica. The Capitoline Temple is dedicated to Jupiter and is of approximately the same dimensions as the Pantheon in Rome. Near the capitol is a square church, with a circular apse dating from the 7th century. One of the sanctuaries featured iconography of (Dea) Africa.

South of the city is a large Byzantine citadel built in the later days of the city.

== Library ==
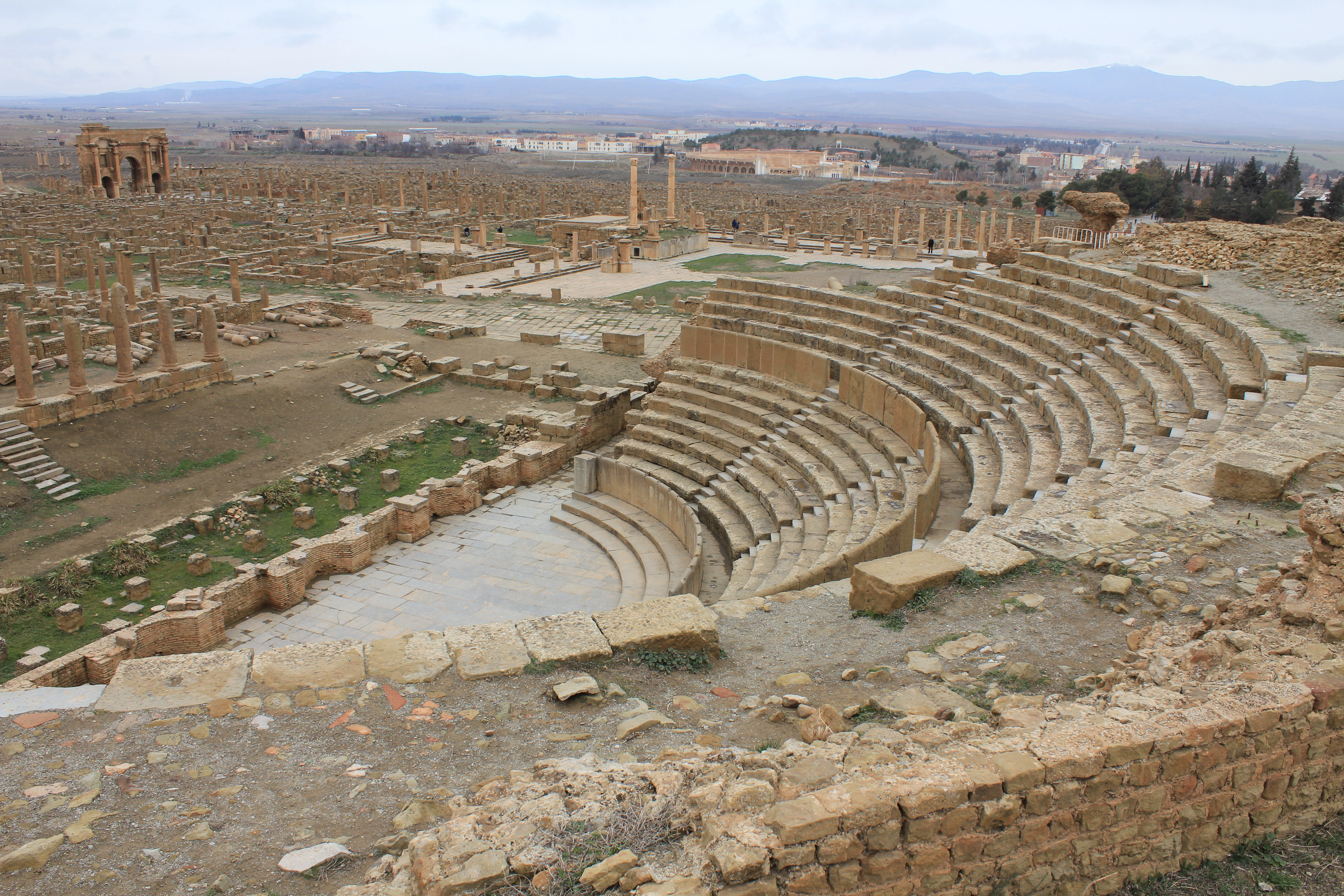
View of Timgad ruins

The Library at Timgad was a gift to the Roman people by Julius Quintianus Flavius Rogatianus at a cost of 400,000 sesterces. As no additional information about this benefactor has been unearthed, the precise date of the library's construction remains uncertain. Based on the remaining archaeological evidence, it has been suggested by scholars that it dates from the late 3rd or possibly the 4th century CE.

The library occupies a rectangle 81 feet (25 meters) long by 77 feet (23 meters) wide. It consists of a large semi-circular room flanked by two secondary rectangular rooms, and preceded by a U-shaped colonnaded portico surrounding three sides on an open court.

The portico is flanked by two long narrow rooms on each side, and the large vaulted hall would have combined the functions of a reading room, stack room, and perhaps a lecture room. Oblong alcoves held wooden shelves along walls that would likely have been complete with sides, backs and doors, based on additional evidence found at the library at Ephesus. It is possible that free-standing bookcases in the center of the room, as well as a reading desk, might also have been present.

While the architecture of the Library at Timgad is not especially remarkable, the discovery of the library is historically important as it shows the presence of a fully developed library system in this Roman city, indicating a high standard of learning and culture. Although the size of the library collection is unknown, it is estimated that it could have accommodated 3,000 scrolls.

== World Heritage Site ==
In 1982, UNESCO inscribed Timgad as a World Heritage Site.

== Gallery ==
Ruins of Timgad (24 February 1928)

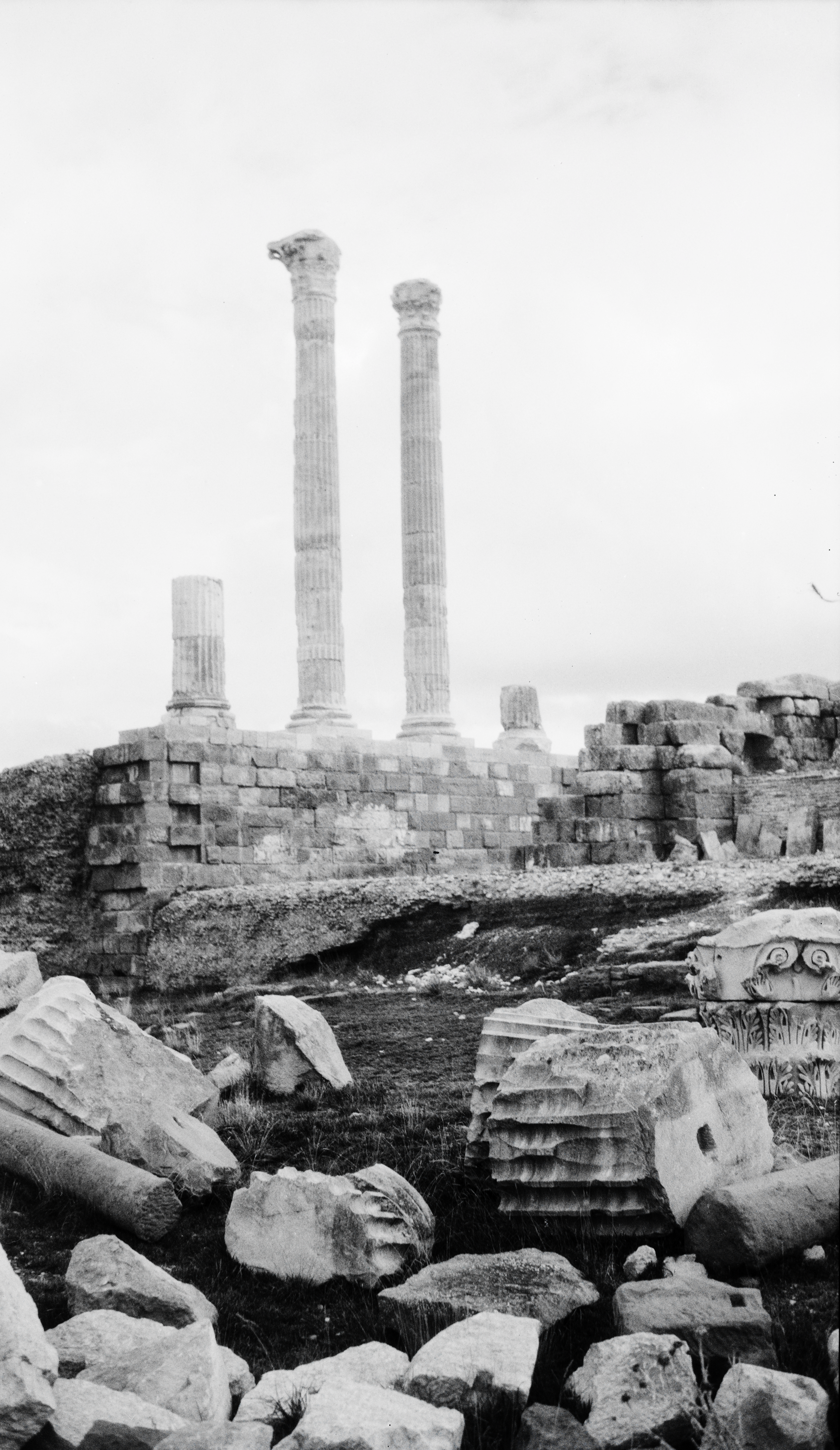

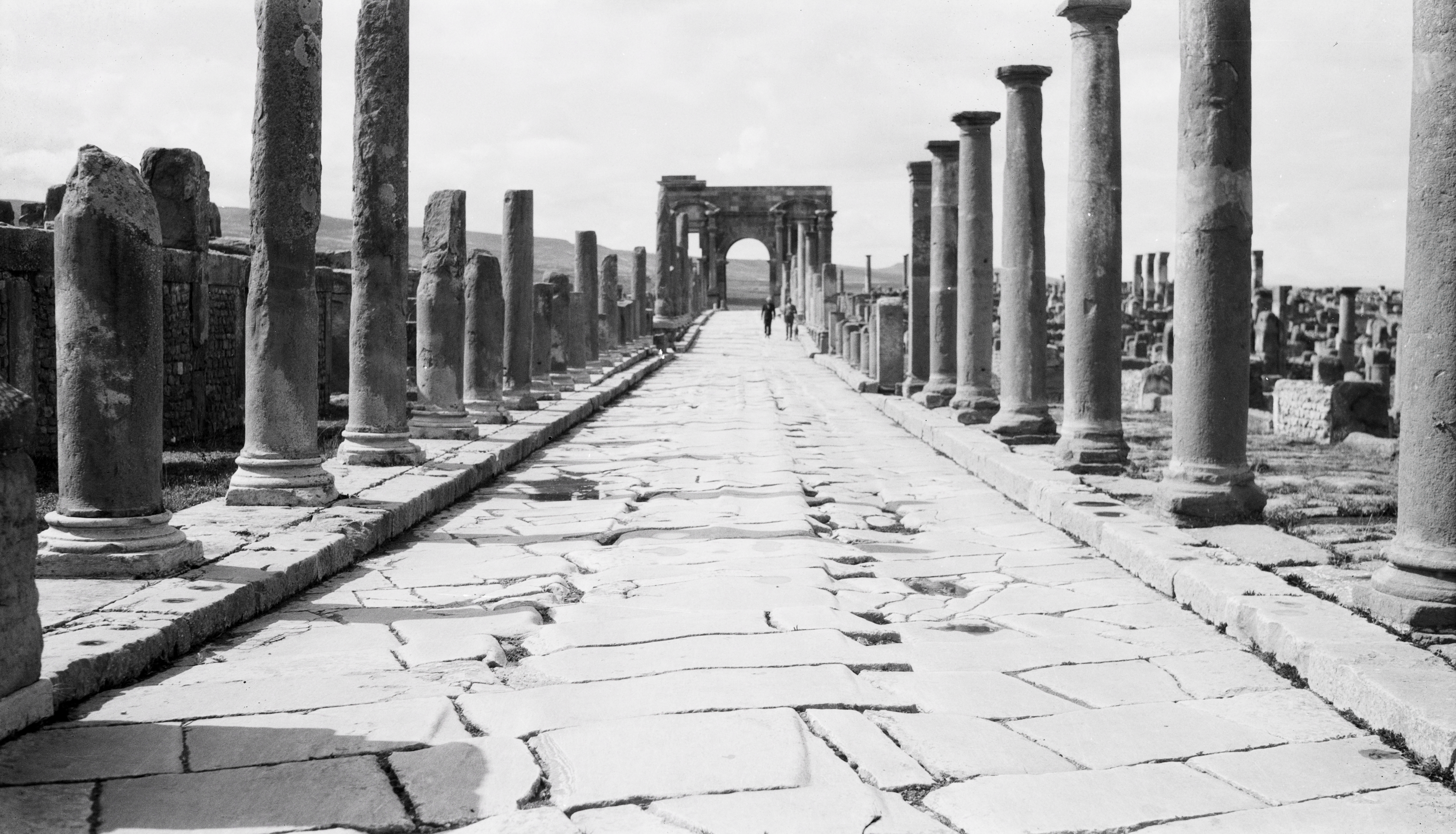

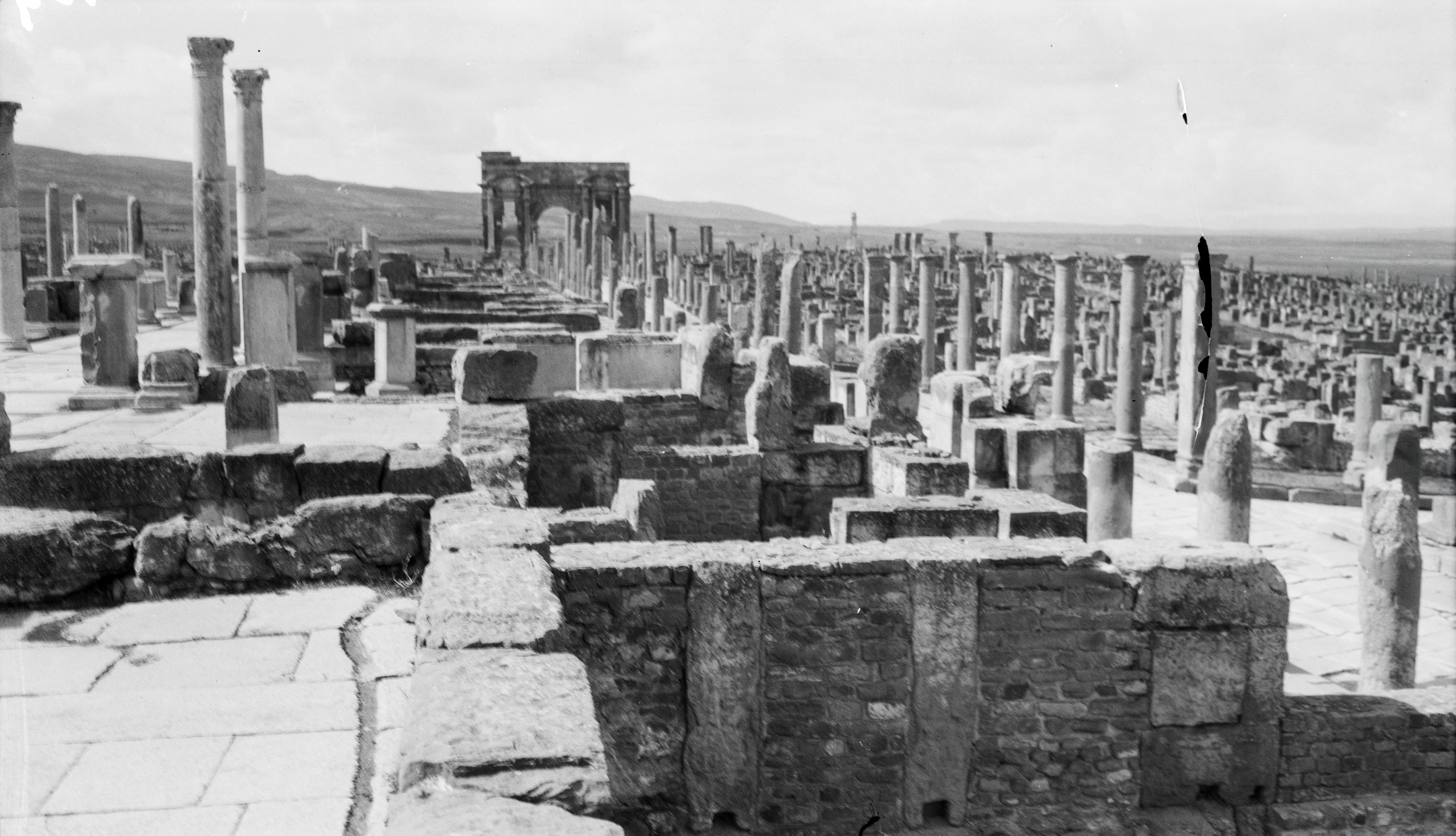

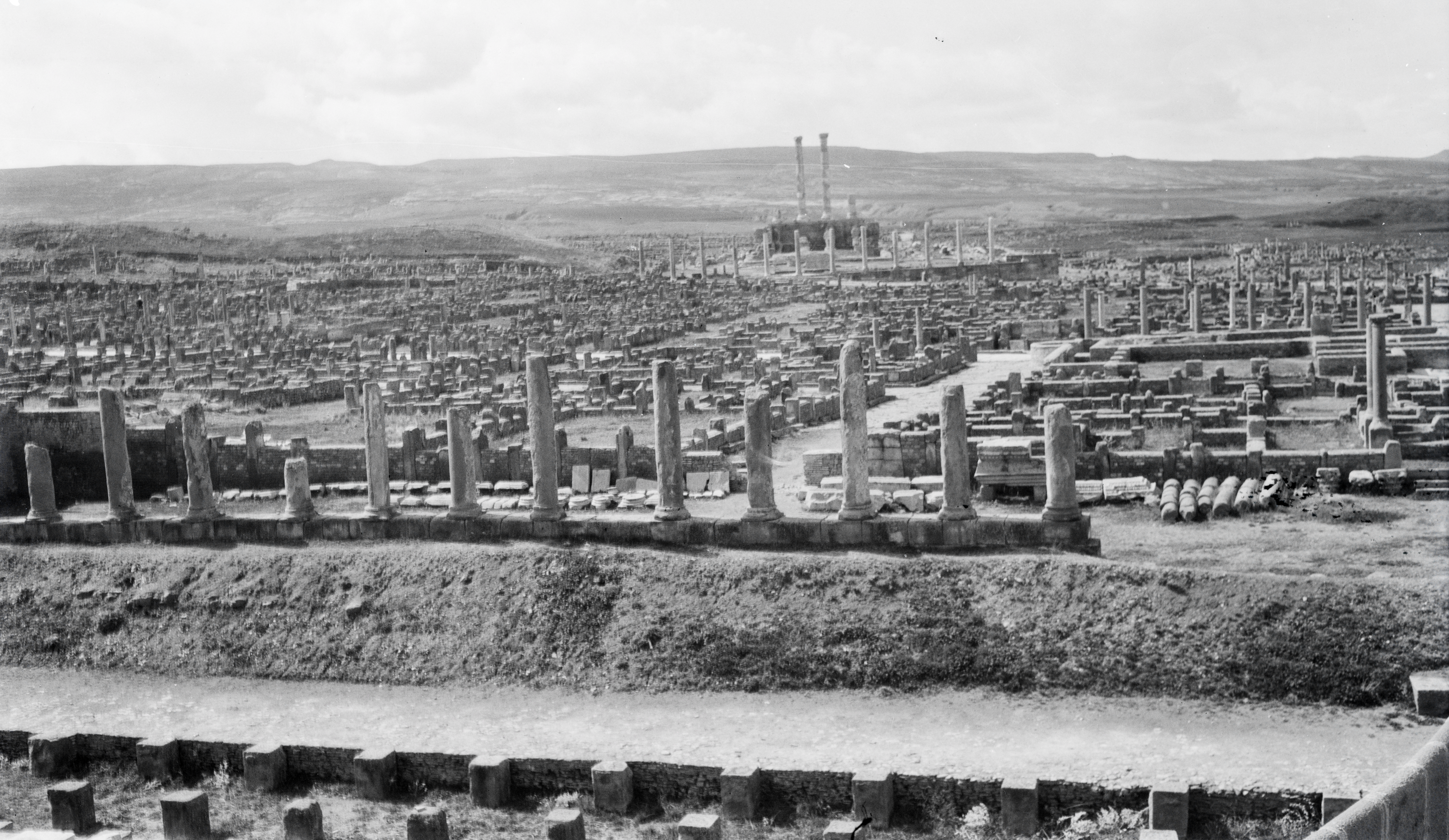

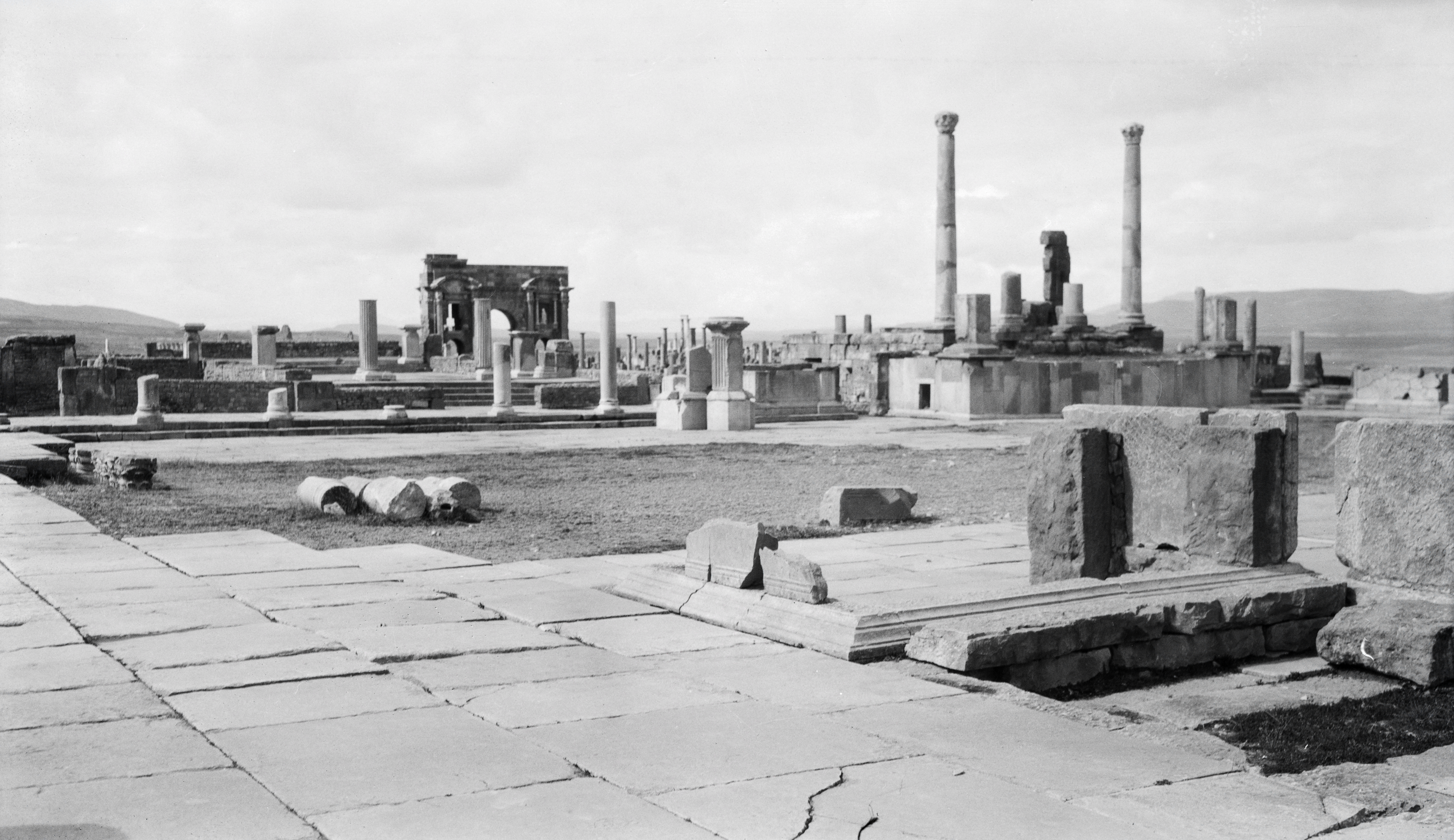

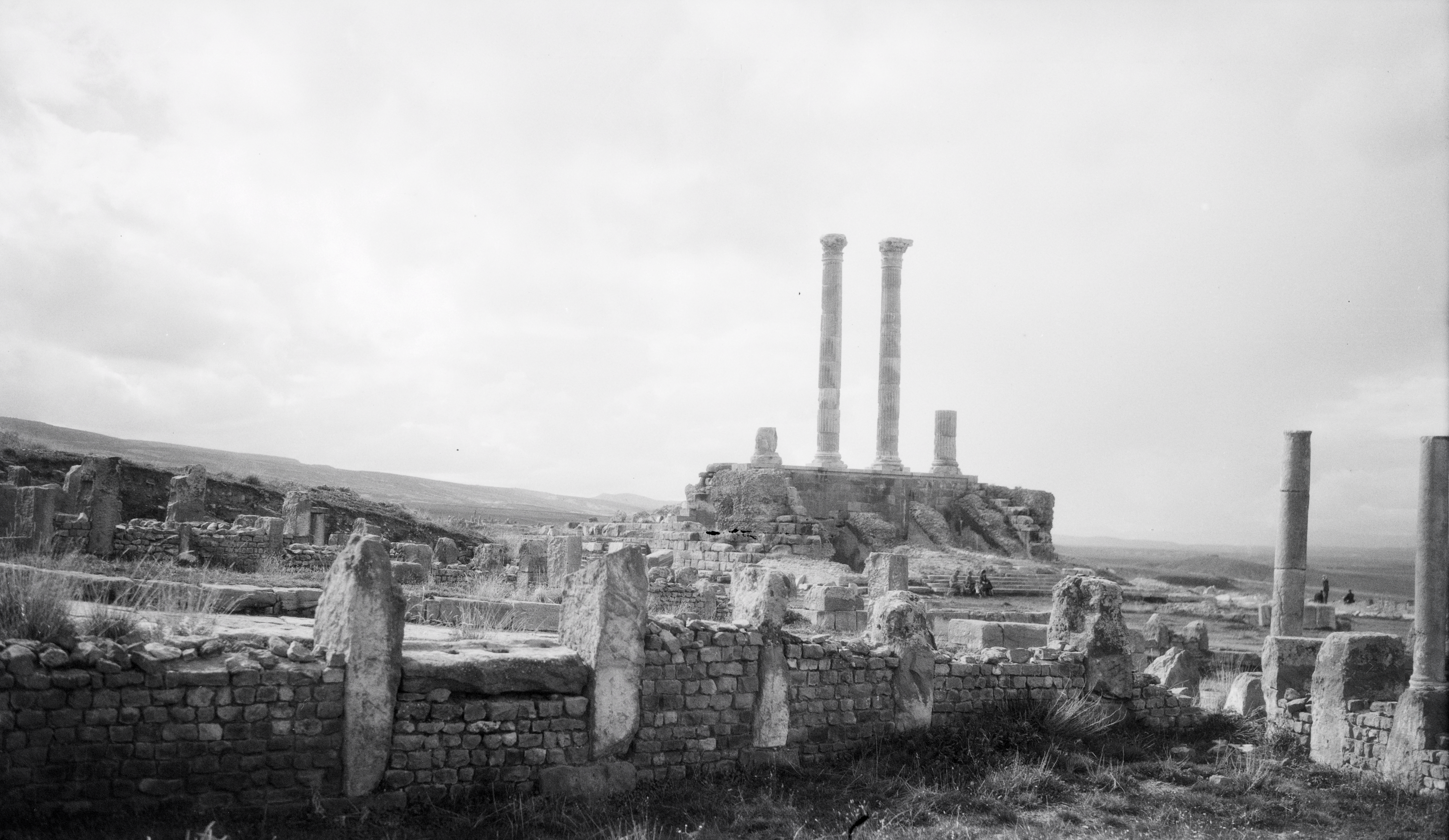

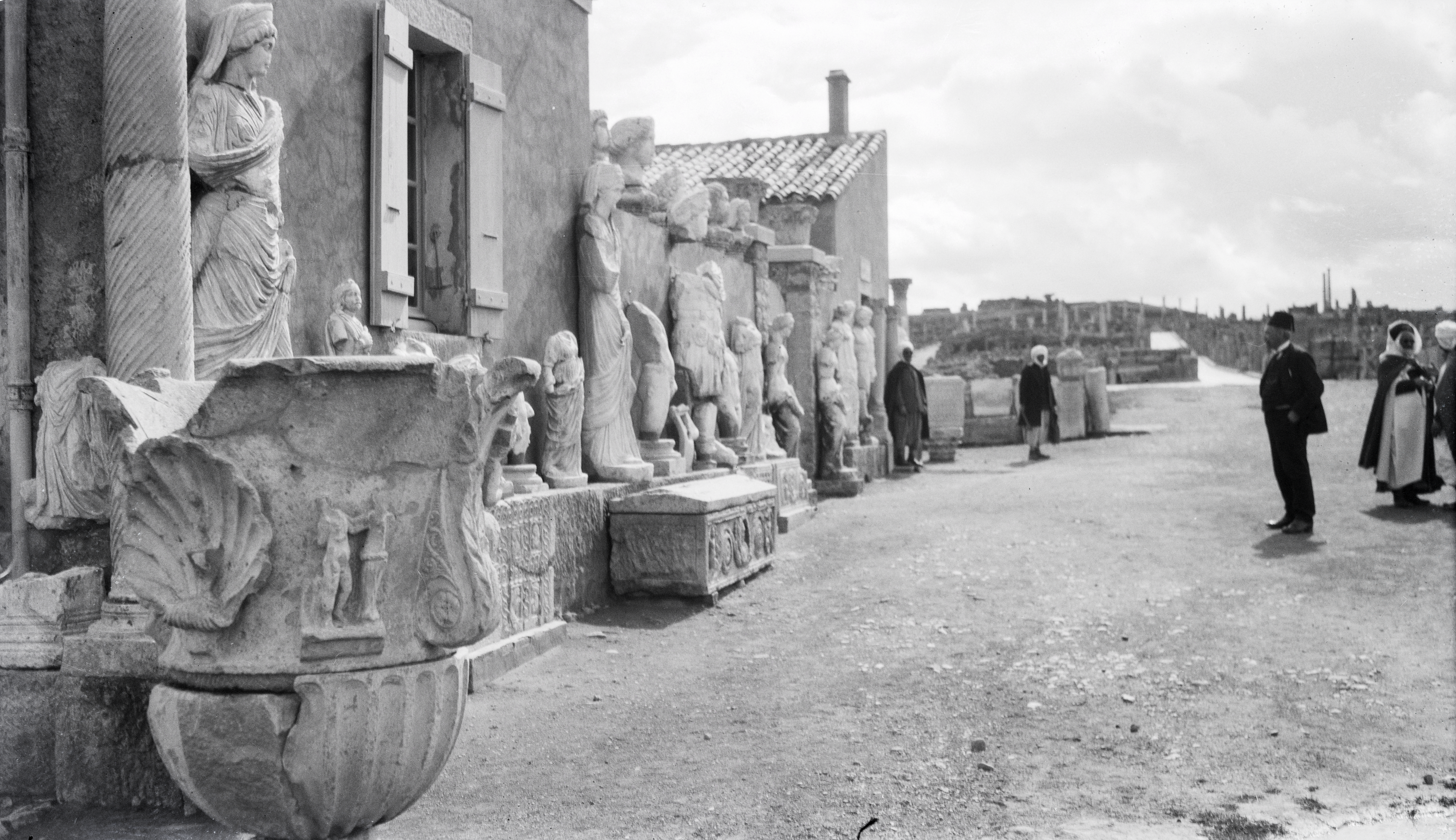

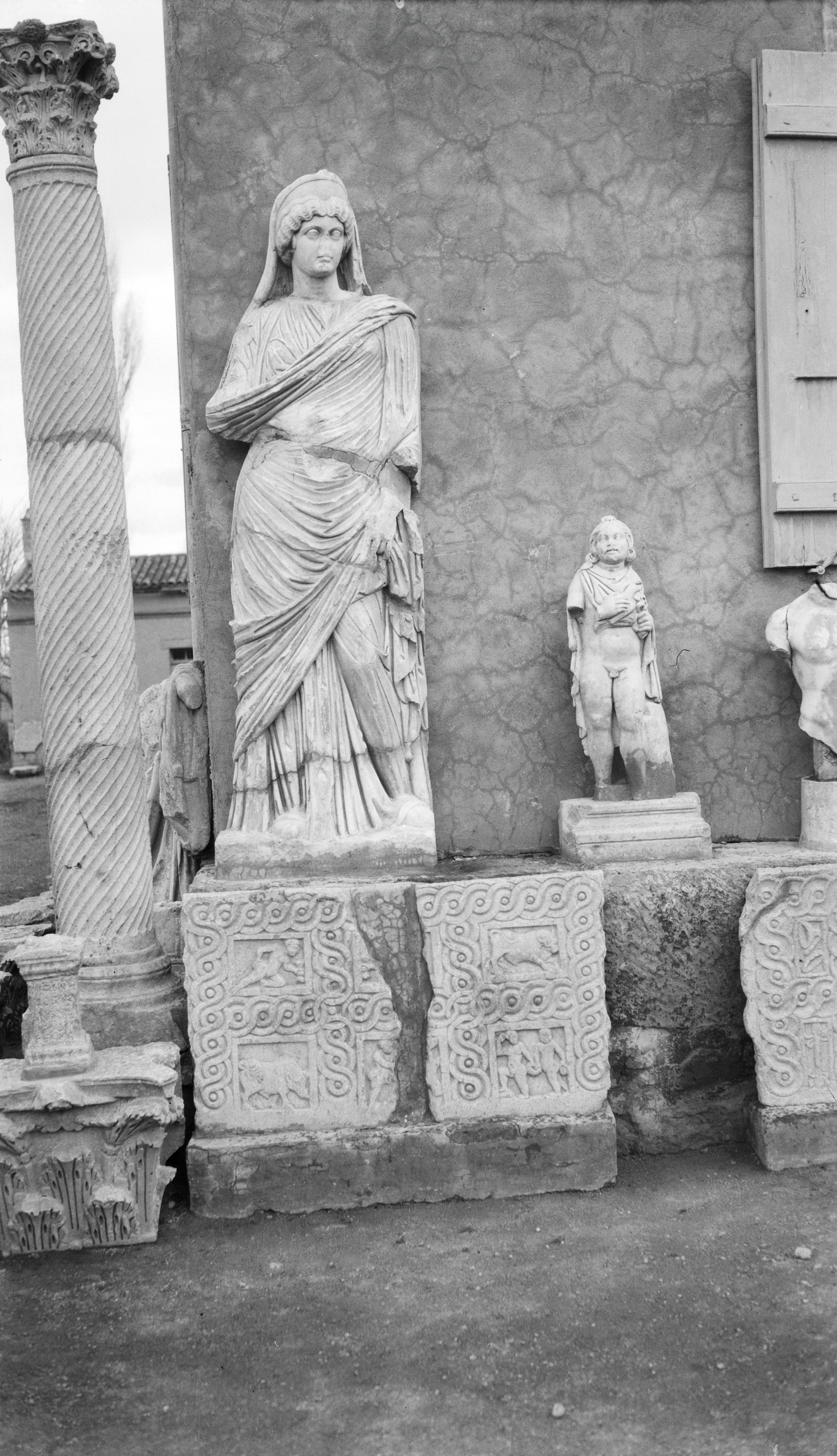

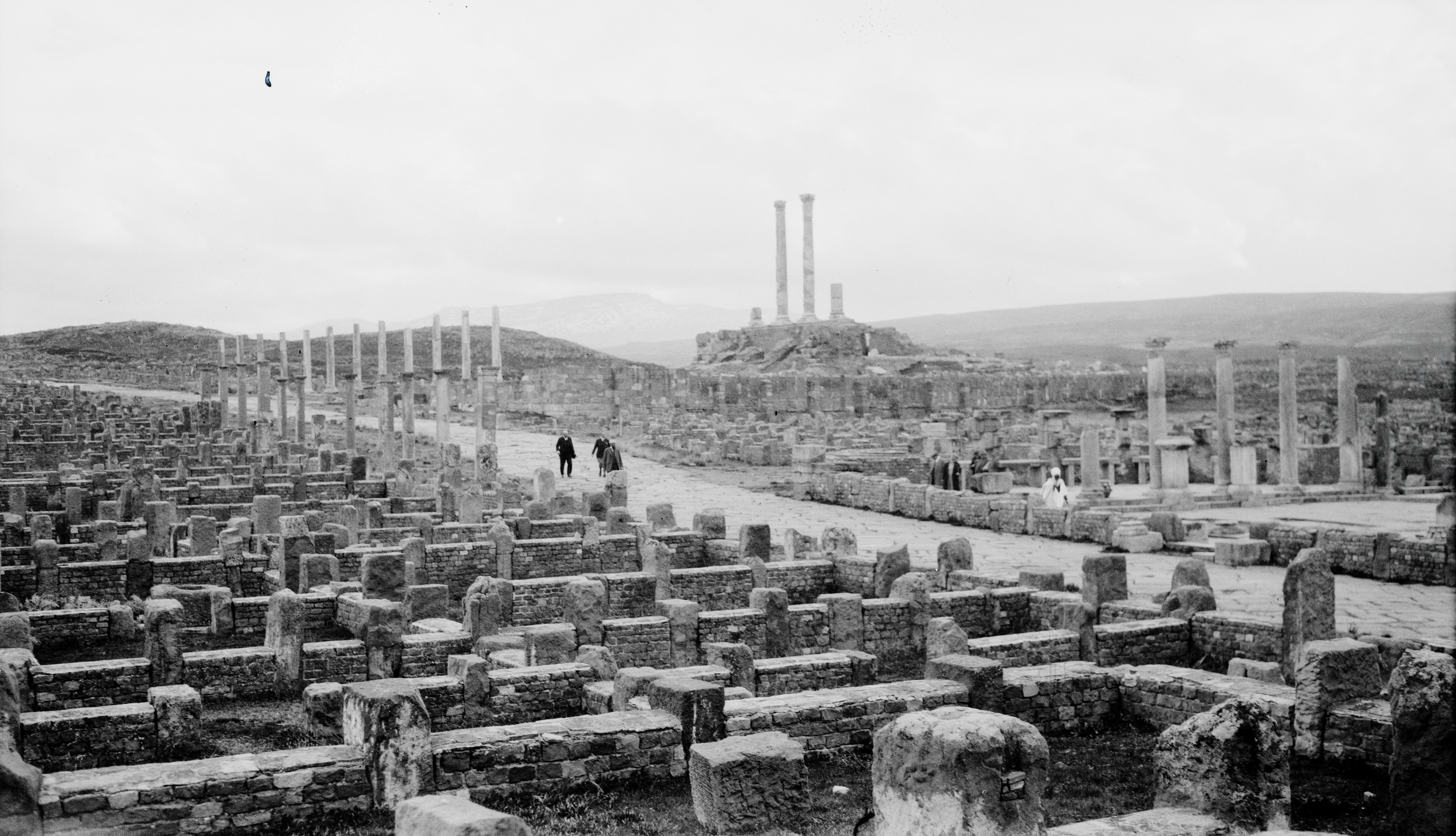

== See also ==
- Djémila
- Jerash
- Lambaesis
- Colonia (Roman)
- List of cultural assets of Algeria
