= Ulpia gens =

Ancient Roman family

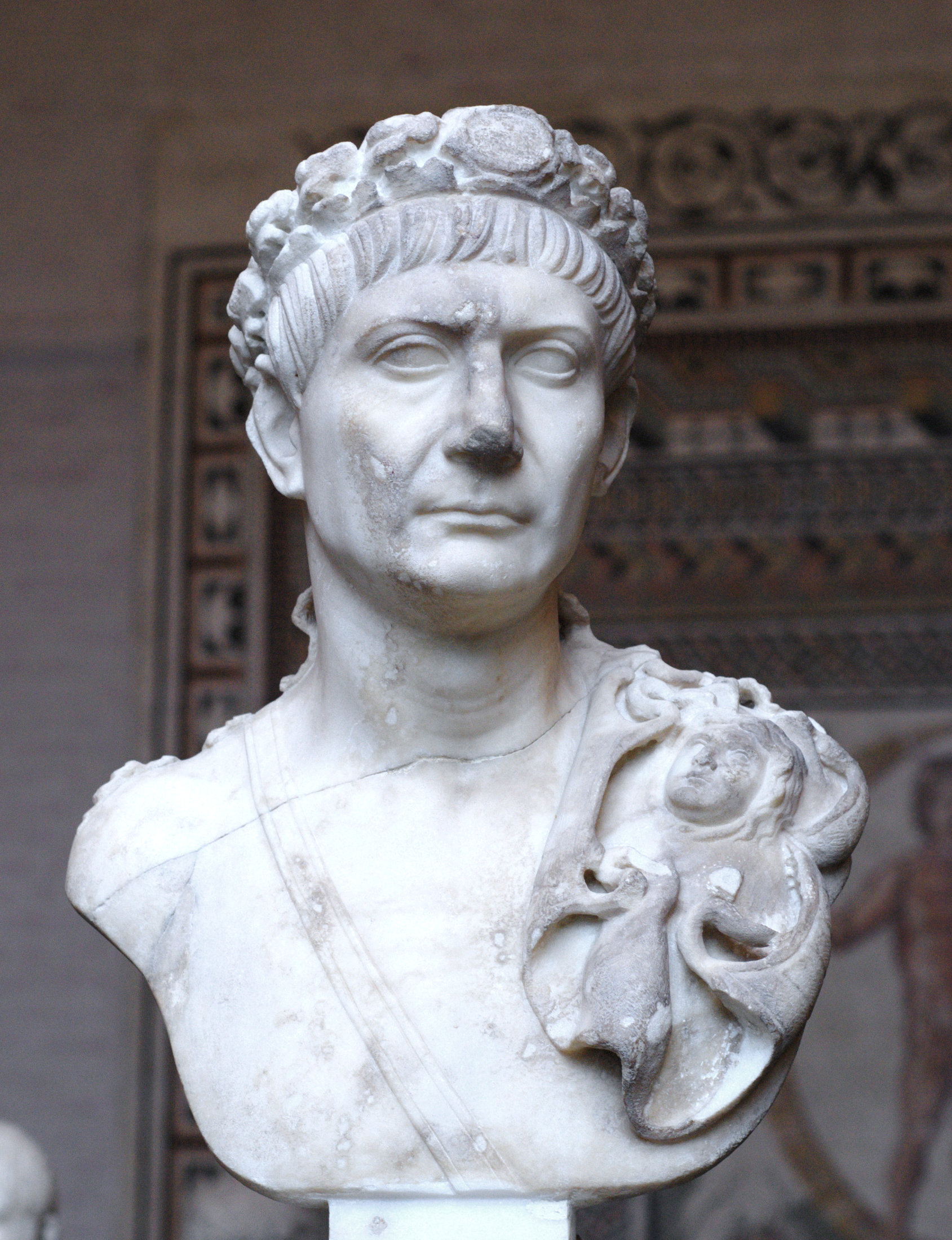
M. Ulpius Trajanus in the Glyptothek, Munich

The gens Ulpia was a Roman family that rose to prominence during the first century AD. The gens is best known from the emperor Marcus Ulpius Trajanus, who reigned from AD 98 to 117. The Thirtieth Legion took its name, Ulpia, in his honor. The city of Serdica, modern day Sofia, was renamed as Ulpia Serdica.

== Origin ==
The Ulpii were from Umbria. Little is known of them except that they were connected with a family of the Aelii from Picenum. The name Ulpius may be derived from an Umbrian cognate of the Latin word lupus, meaning "wolf"; perhaps related to vulpes, Latin for "fox".

The most illustrious members of this gens were the Ulpii Trajani, who, according to a biographer of Trajan, came from the city of Tuder, in southern Umbria; there is evidence of a family of this name there. Members of this family were colonists of Italica in Roman Spain, where Trajan was born. They were related to a family of the Aelii, which had evidently come from Atria; Trajan's aunt was the grandmother of Hadrian, who was likewise born at Italica.

== Branches and cognomina ==
The Ulpii of the empire seem to have used a few cognomina like Trajanus, Marcellus and Leurus. Trajanus indicates descent from or relation to the gens Traia, a family also known to have been present in Hispania. Marcellus is a diminutive of the praenomen Marcus.

== Members ==
This list includes abbreviated praenomina. For an explanation of this practice, see filiation.

=== Ulpii Trajani ===
- Marcus Ulpius Trajanus, father of the emperor Trajan, was consul suffectus in AD 72. (Note: The latest revision of the Fasti Ostienses, by Ladislav Vidman, places his consulship in AD 72, rather than 70, as supposed by Gallivan.)
- Ulpia, perhaps the same person as Ulpia M. f. Plotina recorded in Pompeii, was the aunt of Trajan. She married Publius Aelius Hadrianus Marullinus, and was the grandmother of the emperor Hadrian.
- Marcus Ulpius M. f. Trajanus, consul in AD 91; he was subsequently adopted by the emperor Nerva, and was himself emperor from AD 98 to 117.
- Ulpia M. f. Marciana, the sister of Trajan, married Gaius Salonius Matidius Patruinus.

=== Ulpii Marcelli ===
- Marcus Ulpius Marcellus, admiral of the Classis Ravennas around AD 119.
- Ulpius Marcellus, a jurist during the reigns of Antoninus Pius and Marcus Aurelius.
- Ulpius Marcellus, perhaps a son of the jurist, governor of Britannia during the reign of Commodus.
- Ulpius Marcellus, probably the same person as the governor of Britannia, although uncertainties of chronology have led some scholars to believe he had a son of the same name.

=== Others ===
- Ulpia Plotina, the wife of Titus Calestrius Ampliatus. She must be distinguished from the Ulpia Plotina mentioned in an inscription from Pompeii.
- Marcus Ulpius Leurus, a native of Hypata, was consul suffectus during the later second century.
- Marcus Ulpius Primianus, prefect of Egypt from AD 195 to 196.
- Ulpius Julianus, praetorian prefect under the emperor Macrinus, was sent to put down the rebellion of Elagabalus, but was slain by his own troops in AD 218.
- Ulpia Gordiana, mother of the emperor Gordian I, according to the Augustan History.
- Marcus Ulpius Eubiotus Leurus, son of the consul Leurus, was consul suffectus in an uncertain year around AD 230.
- Marcus Ulpius M. f. Flavius Tisamenus, elder son of the consul Eubiotus Leurus.
- Marcus Ulpius M. f. Pupienus Maximus, younger son of the consul Eubiotus Leurus.
- Ulpius Crinitus, according to Vopiscus, a successful general in the time of Valerian, who claimed to be a descendant of the house of Trajan. He adopted Lucius Domitius Aurelianus, the future emperor Aurelian, alongside whom he was appointed consul suffectus in AD 257. Modern historians suspect that he was an invention of the author, but if he existed, he may have been the father of the empress Ulpia Severina.
- Gaius Ulpius Cornelius Laelianus, one of the "Thirty Tyrants", he rebelled against Postumus and proclaimed himself emperor in AD 269, during the reign of Gallienus, but was slain at Moguntiacum about two months later.
- Ulpia Severina, the wife of Aurelian, and Roman empress from AD 271 to 275.
- Marcus Ulpius Pupienus Silvanus, a senator mentioned in an inscription from Surrentum in Campania, dating between the late third and mid-fourth century; from his name perhaps a descendant of the consul Marcus Ulpius Leurus.

== See also ==
- List of Roman gentes

== Bibliography ==
- Gaius Plinius Caecilius Secundus (Pliny the Younger), Panegyricus Trajani (Panegyric on Trajan).
- Lucius Cassius Dio Cocceianus (Cassius Dio), Roman History.
- Herodianus, History of the Empire from the Death of Marcus.
- Aelius Lampridius, Aelius Spartianus, Flavius Vopiscus, Julius Capitolinus, Trebellius Pollio, and Vulcatius Gallicanus, Historia Augusta (Augustan History).
- Eutropius, Breviarium Historiae Romanae (Abridgement of the History of Rome).
- Sextus Aurelius Victor, De Caesaribus (On the Caesars), Epitome de Caesaribus (attributed).
- Louis-Sébastien Le Nain de Tillemont, Histoire des Empereurs et des Autres Princes qui ont Régné Durant les Six Premiers Siècles de l’Église (History of the Emperors and Other Princes who Ruled During the First Six Centuries of the Church), Chez Rollin Fils, Paris (1690-1697, 1701, 1738).
- Joseph Hilarius Eckhel, Doctrina Numorum Veterum (The Study of Ancient Coins, 1792–1798).
- Dictionary of Greek and Roman Biography and Mythology, William Smith, ed., Little, Brown and Company, Boston (1849).
- James H. Oliver, "The Sacred Gerusia", in Hesperia Supplements, No. 6 (1941).
- Ronald Syme, Tacitus, Clarendon Press, Oxford (1958).
- Ronald Syme, Roman Papers, vol. 7, Clarendon Press, Oxford (1979), ISBN 9780198144908.
- Paul A. Gallivan, "The Fasti for A.D. 70–96", in Classical Quarterly, vol. 31, pp. 186–220 (1981).
- Paul M. M. Leunissen, Konsuln und Konsulare in der Zeit von Commodus bis Severus Alexander, J.C. Gieben, Amsterdam (1989).
- Julian Bennett, Trajan: Optimus Princeps, Routledge, (1997).
- Daniël den Hengst, Emperors and Historiography: Collected Essays on the Literature of the Roman Empire by Daniël den Hengst, Brill, Leiden (2010).
- Werner Eck and Andreas Pangerl, "Ein M. Ulpius Marcellus als praefectus classis Ravennatis in einem Diplom des Jahres 119 n. Chr.", in Zeitschrift für Papyrologie und Epigraphik, vol. 181, pp. 202–206 (2012).
