= Escacena del Campo =

Coordinates: 37°25′N 6°23′W

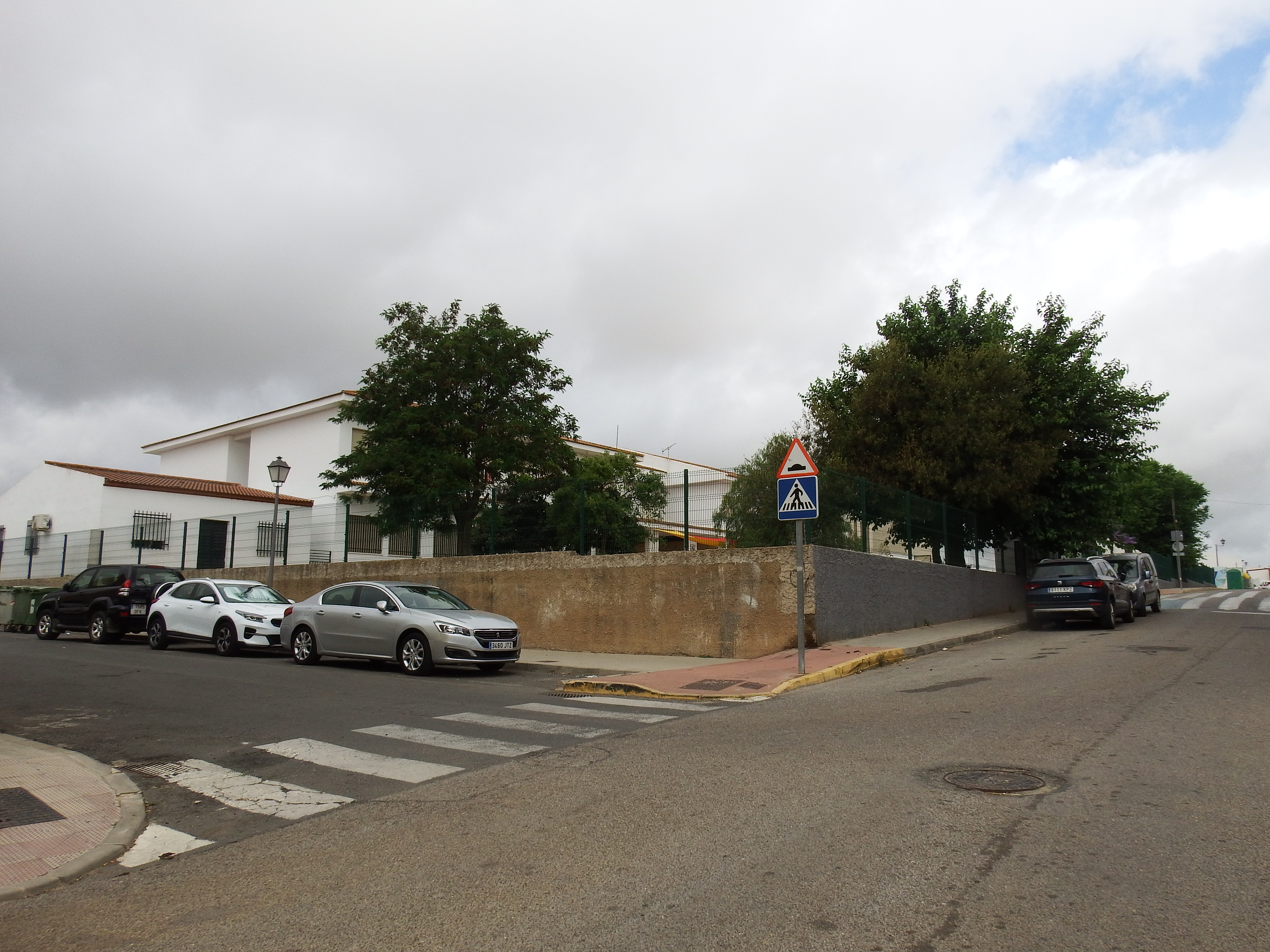

- Flag Coat of arms

- Location in Spain.
- Country: Spain
- Autonomous community: Andalusia
- Province: Huelva

Area
  - Total: 136 km^{2} (53 sq mi)
- Elevation: 173 m (568 ft)

Population (2025-01-01)
  - Total: 2,327
  - Density: 17.1/km^{2} (44.3/sq mi)
- Time zone: UTC+1 (CET)
  - Summer (DST): UTC+2 (CEST)
- Website: www.escacenadelcampo.es

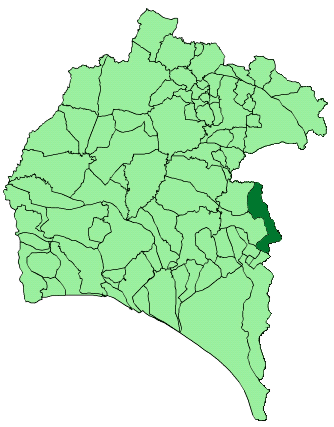
Map of Escacena del Campo, Huelva

Escacena del Campo is a town and municipality located in the province of Huelva, Spain. According to the 2025 municipal register, the municipality has a population of 2,327 inhabitants.

== See also ==
- List of municipalities in Huelva
