= Optatus of Thamugadai =

Optatus of Thamugadi was, from 388 to 398, a donatist bishop in the city of Thamugadi (Timgad) in the Roman province of Numidia. He was an important subject in the anti-donatistic polemic of Augustine, who was at that time a bishop in Hippo Regius and who called him evil.

Optatus was associated both with the militant Circumcellions, which are regarded as adherents of the Donatists, as well as with the renegade Roman general Gildo. Augustine made Optatus responsible for attacks on Catholics, but also at the anti-Donatist opponents, the Maximinianists.

== Biography ==
In 388 Optatus was elected Bishop of Thamugadi, the most important Donatist bishopric in southern Numidia.

In 398, he and Gildo, Comes Africae, were joint leaders of a revolt against Honorius, Their revolt established non-Roman and native power in North Africa, with Gildo being the political power and Optatus, the philosophy behind this political movement. It has traditionally been claimed that Gildo lead bands of Circumcellions to terrorise the countryside though Frend failed to find record of religious coercion by the Donatists upon the neighboring Catholics.

An inscription bearing the name of bishop Optatus has been found in the Donatist basilica at Thamugadi.

He should not be confused with St. Optates, Bishop of Milevis, who was a contemporary, and fierce critic of Donatism.
