= Alcolea del Río =

Spanish municipality

Coordinates: 37°37′N 5°40′W

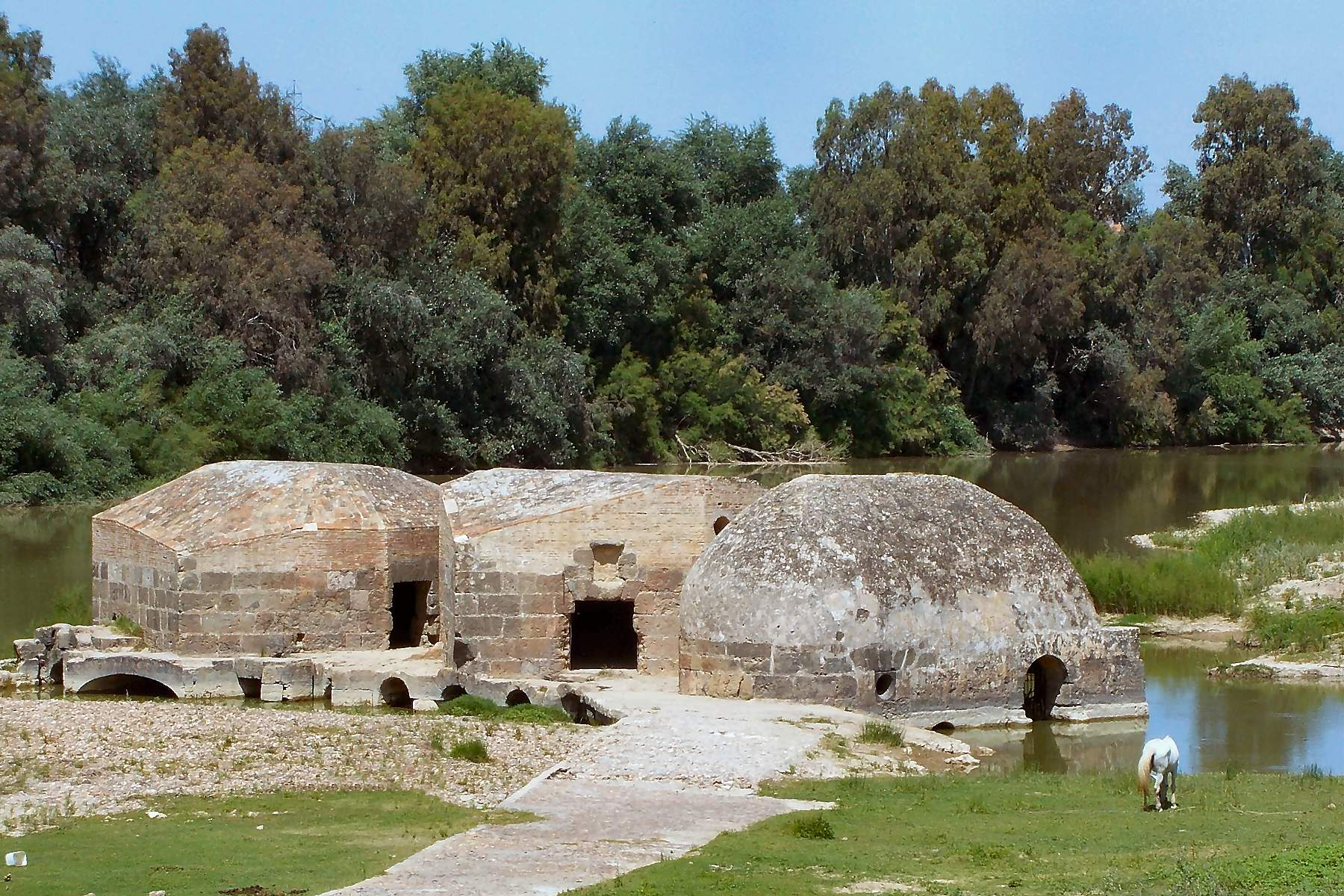
- Old mill of Arina Ärabe, Alcolea del Río

- Flag Coat of arms

- Location in Spain.
- Country: Spain
- Autonomous community: Andalusia
- Province: Seville

Government
  - Mayor: José Raimundo López (Ind.)

Area
  - Total: 50.17 km^{2} (19.37 sq mi)
- Elevation: 32 m (105 ft)

Population (2024)
  - Total: 3,307
  - Density: 65.92/km^{2} (170.7/sq mi)
- Time zone: UTC+1 (CET)
  - Summer (DST): UTC+2 (CEST)
- Website: www.alcoleadelrio.es

Alcolea del Río is a municipality in Seville, Spain. In 2023, it had a population of 3,307. It has an area of 50.17 square kilometers (19.37 sq mi) and population density of 66 inhabitants per square kilometer (170/sq mi). It is situated at an altitude of 32 meters (105 ft) and is 53 kilometers (33 mi) from Seville.

== See also ==
- List of municipalities in Seville
