= Athenais =

Athenais is an ancient Greek feminine given name which refers to the Greek goddess Athena. Athénaïs is a more recent French variant.

Notable people with these names include:

- Athenais (seer), 4th-century BC prophetess who told Alexander the Great of his allegedly divine descent
- Athenais Philostorgos I (fl. 1st century BC), Queen of Cappadocia
- Athenais Philostorgos II (fl. 1st century BC), princess from the Kingdom of Pontus and through marriage a Roman client queen of Cappadocia
- Athenais of Media Atropatene (fl. 1st century BC), princess from the Kingdom of Commagene and wife of Artavasdes I of Media Atropatene
- Athenais (daughter of Herodes Atticus) (141–161), noblewoman who lived in the Roman Empire
- Athenais (great-granddaughter of Herodes Atticus), Roman noblewoman who lived between the second half of the 2nd century and first half of the 3rd century
- Aelia Eudocia (c. 401–460), birth name Athenaïs, wife of Eastern Roman Emperor Theodosius II
- Athénaïs Michelet (1826–1899), French natural history writer and memoirist

== See also ==
- Françoise-Athénaïs, marquise de Montespan (1641–1707), better known as Madame de Montespan, chief mistress of King Louis XIV of France
