= Athenais (great-granddaughter of Herodes Atticus) =

Athenais (Ancient Greek: Αθηναΐς) was a Roman noblewoman of Greek Athenian and Italian Roman descent. Athenais lived between the second half of the 2nd century and first half of the 3rd century in the Roman Empire.

Athenais was the daughter of the Athenian Aristocrat Lucius Vibullius Hipparchus and his wife, whose name is unknown. Her paternal half uncle was Lucius Vibullius Claudius Herodes. Her paternal grandparents was the Aristocrat Lucius Vibullius Rufus and noblewoman Athenais. Athenais was named in honor of her late paternal grandmother. Her paternal grandparents were paternal second cousins. Through her paternal grandmother, Athenais was a great granddaughter of the Sophist Herodes Atticus and Roman aristocratic noblewoman Aspasia Annia Regilla and through her paternal grandfather she was a great granddaughter of Publius Aelius Vibullius Rufus who served as an Archon of Athens in 143–144. Herodes Atticus and Publius Aelius Vibullius Rufus were first cousins. Through Aspasia Annia Regilla, Athenais was a relative to the family of the Roman Emperor Marcus Aurelius and Roman Empress Faustina the Younger.

Athenais was born and raised in Athens. She is only known from honorific inscriptions dedicated to her in Greece. There was a statue dedicated to her at Olympia, Greece and the headless statue of her is on display at the Archaeological Museum of Olympia.

== Ancestry ==
Ancestors of Athenais (great-granddaughter of Herodes Atticus)

16. Lucius Vibullius Hipparchus
8. Publius Aelius Vibullius Rufus
17. Name unknown
4. Lucius Vibullius Rufus
9. Name unknown
2. Lucius Vibullius Hipparchus
20. Tiberius Claudius Atticus Herodes
10. Herodes Atticus
21. Vibullia Alcia Agrippina
5. Athenais
22. Appius Annius Trebonius Gallus
11. Aspasia Annia Regilla
23. Atilia Caucidia Tertulla
1. Athenais
3. Name unknown

== Sources ==
- Σ. Θ. Φωτείνου, Ολυμπία - Οδηγός Αρχαιοτήτων, Συγκρότημα Γραφικών Τεχνών, Άνω Καλαμάκι Αθήνα, 1972
- Graindor, P., Un milliardaire antique, Ayers Company Publishers, 1979
- Pomeroy, S.B., The murder of Regilla: a case of domestic violence in antiquity, Harvard University Press, 2007
- https://web.archive.org/web/20110716083759/http://www.sleepinbuff.com/13history.pdf
- http://www.vroma.org/~bmcmanus/women_civicdonors.html
