= Elpinice (daughter of Herodes Atticus) =

Greco-Roman noblewoman (142-165)

- Born: Elpinice c. 142; Athens, Greece
- Died: 165
- Occupation: Noblewoman

Appia Annia Claudia Atilia Regilla Elpinice Agrippina Atria Polla (Ancient Greek: Αππία Αννία Κλαυδία Ατιλία Ρήγιλλα Ελπινίκη Αγριππίνα Ατρία Πώλλα) otherwise most commonly known as Elpinice (Ancient Greek: Ελπινίκη) (c. 142–165) was a Roman noblewoman of Greek Athenian and Italian Roman descent who lived in the Roman Empire.

== Ancestry and family ==
Elpinice was born to a distinguished and rich family of consular rank. She was the first daughter among the children of the Greek Athenian Roman Senator, Sophist Herodes Atticus and the Roman aristocratic, influential noblewoman Aspasia Annia Regilla.

The paternal grandparents of Elpinice were the Roman senator Tiberius Claudius Atticus Herodes and the wealthy heiress Vibullia Alcia Agrippina, while her maternal grandparents were the Roman senator Consul Appius Annius Trebonius Gallus and the aristocratic woman Atilia Caucidia Tertulla. Her paternal uncle was Tiberius Claudius Atticus Herodianus while her paternal aunt was Claudia Tisamenis. The maternal uncle of Elpinice was Appius Annius Atilius Bradua, who served as an ordinary consul in 160.

Through her maternal grandfather, Elpinice was a relative to the Roman empress Faustina the Elder, wife of the Roman emperor Antoninus Pius. Faustina the Elder was the mother of Roman Empress Faustina the Younger and aunt of Roman emperor Marcus Aurelius. Thus, she was a relative to the family of Faustina the Younger and Marcus Aurelius.

== Life ==
Elpinice was most probably born in the villa owned by her parents on the Appian Way. After her father's consulship in 143, Elpinice with her parents and her family left Italy and moved to Greece. Elpinice was directly cut off from her immediate family and relatives in Italy. She and her family became a part of the highest Greek circle of society in Athens.

The parents of Elpinice erected a great outdoor nymphaeum (a monumental fountain) at Olympia, Greece. The monumental fountain features statues and honors members of the ruling imperial family, including members of her family and relatives of her parents. Among the statues is a bust of Elpinice, which is on display at the Archaeological Museum of Olympia. Elpinice married an unnamed Roman aristocrat by whom she may have had a son.

== Sources ==
- Σ. Θ. Φωτείνου, Ολυμπία - Οδηγός Αρχαιοτήτων, Συγκρότημα Γραφικών Τεχνών, Άνω Καλαμάκι Αθήνα, 1972
- Graindor, P., Un milliardaire antique, Ayers Company Publishers, 1979
- Wilson, N.G., Encyclopedia of Ancient Greece, Routledge, 2006
- Pomeroy, S.B., The murder of Regilla: a case of domestic violence in antiquity, Harvard University Press, 2007
- Vroma.org
