= Vibullia gens =

Ancient Roman family

The gens Vibullia, occasionally written Vibulia, was a minor plebeian family at ancient Rome. Members of this gens first appear in history in the years following the Third Samnite War, but after this they are hardly mentioned until the end of the Republic, at which time they were of senatorial rank. A wealthy family of this name rose to prominence at Athens during the latter part of the first century. Others are known from inscriptions.

== Origin ==
The nomen Vibullius belongs to a relatively small class of gentilicia formed directly from cognomina ending in the diminutive suffix -ulus. The root appears to be the praenomen Vibius, uncommon at Rome but relatively common in Oscan-speaking regions of Italy. The name would thus be cognate with other gentilicia, such as Vibuleius and Vibidius.

== Praenomina ==
The main praenomina of the Vibullii were Lucius and Marcus, two of the most abundant names at all periods of Roman history. These were supplemented as needed with other common praenomina, such as Gaius and Quintus. A few Vibullii bore other names, including Decimus, Publius, and Titus.

== Branches and cognomina ==
The only distinct family of the Vibulii bore the cognomen Rufus, originally indicating someone with red hair, and belonging to a large class of surnames derived from the physical traits of individuals.

== Members ==
This list includes abbreviated praenomina. For an explanation of this practice, see filiation.

- Decimus Vibullius, a military tribune, commanded the besieged Roman garrison at Thurii in 282 BC, while the consul Gaius Fabricius Luscinus was engaged in fighting against the Samnites, Bruttii, and Lucani, whom he defeated to raise the siege.
- Marcus Vibullius M. l. Septimus, a freedman memorialized at Casilinum in Campania, with a first-century BC cenotaph dedicated by the freedwoman Numisia Glapira.
- Lucius Vibullius C. f., along with Gaius Alfius Surus, dedicated a tomb at Fabrateria Vetus in Latium, dating between the beginning of the first century BC, and the middle of the first century AD, for his friend, Lucius Alfius Rufus.
- Vibullius Agrippa, a senator who killed himself in the reign of Tiberius, before he could be convicted of any crime.
- Lucius Vibullius Pontianus, made an offering to Diana at Veleia, according to an inscription dating between the death of Augustus and the middle of the first century.
- Vibullius, a military tribune serving with the Legio VII Claudia at Promona in Dalmatia during the reign of Caligula.
- Gaius Vibulius C. f. Valentinus, a native of Mediolanum in Gallia Narbonensis, was a soldier in the Legio XXII Primigenia, buried at Mogontiacum in Germania Superior, aged thirty-eight, and having served eighteen years, in a tomb dating from the reigns of Claudius or Nero.
- Vibullius Felicio, named in a wooden inscription from Pompeii in Campania.
- Gaius Vibullius Fidus, a former procurator in Syria, was buried in a first-century tomb built by his wife at Ficulea in Latium.
- Quintus Vibullius Secundio, one of the seviri Augustales, buried in a first-century tomb at Peltuinum in Sabinum, with a monument from his wife, the freedwoman Vibullia Marina.
- Vibullia Marina, a freedwoman who dedicated a first-century monument at Peltuinum for her husband, Quintus Vibullius Secundus.
- Vibullius, praetor in AD 58, during the reign of Nero, ordered the arrest of several disorderly persons, who were then released by Antistius, one of the plebeian tribunes. Vibullius complained of this to the senate, which censured Antistius. This was one of several disputes involving the authority of magistrates and other public officials at this time, which led to a number of reforms.
- Lucius Vibullius Pius, a native of Isthmia in Achaia, was a priest of Mars, named in an inscription from Corinth, dating from the last decade of the first century.
- Lucius Vibullius, named in an inscription from Veleia, dating from the reign of Nerva.
- Lucius Vibullius Montanus, one of the seviri Augustales serving the cult of the Flavian emperors, buried at Aquae Statiellae in Liguria, along with his children, Lucius, another Lucius, Titus, and Procula, in a tomb dating between the death of Vespasian and the end of the second century.
- Lucius Vibullius L. f., either of two sons of Lucius Vibullius Montanus, the Flavian priest, buried with their father and siblings at Aquae Statiellae.
- Titus Vibullius L. f., a son of Lucius Vibullius Montanus, the Flavian priest, buried with his father and siblings at Aquae Statiellae.
- Procula Vibullia L. f., or perhaps Vibullia L. f. Procula, the daughter of Lucius Vibullius Montanus, the Flavian priest, buried with her father and siblings at Aquae Statiellae.
- Lucius Vibullius Successus, named on a number of pottery stamps from Rome, originating from the estate of Annius Verus, and dating from AD 123.
- Publius Coelius P. f. Balbinus Vibullius Pius, (Note: Evidently a member of the Coelia gens, descended from the Vibullii through a maternal line, as his name was usually abbreviated to "Publius Coelius Balbinus".) consul in AD 137.
- Quintus Vibullius, built a monument to the flaminica Vennonia Marcellina at Pollentia in Liguria, paid for by the decurions of the city, and dating between AD 130 and 150.
- Marcus Vibullius Verus, a native of Dertona in Liguria, was a speculator, or scout, serving in the second cohort of the praetorian guard at Rome in AD 143.
- Marcus Vibullius Venerianus, along with his wife, Cornelia Gemella, dedicated a second century tomb at Patrae in Achaia for their son, Marcus Vibullius.
- Marcus Vibullius M. f., buried at Patrae, in a second-century tomb dedicated by his parents, Marcus Vibullius Venerianus and Cornelia Gemella.
- Vibullia Calliope, buried in a second-century tomb at Furfo in Sabinum, along with Lucius Variasius.
- Lucius Vibullius Fortunatus, buried at Interamna Lirenas, aged fifty years, six months, and seven days, in a second-century tomb built by his wife, Valeria Capitolina.
- Lucius Vibullius Pius Augustanus Alpinus Bellicius Sollers, one of the priests of the imperial cult at Tibur during the late second century.
- Quintus Vibullius Baric, the husband of Julia Saturnina, father of Vibullia Saturnina, and grandfather of Claudia Monna. His wife dedicated a second- or third-century tomb at Tipasa in Mauretania Caesariensis for their daughter and granddaughter.
- Vibullia Q. f. Saturnina, the daughter of Quintus Vibullius Baric and Julia Saturnina, buried at Tipasa along with her daughter or niece, Claudia Monna, in a second- or third-century tomb built by her mother.
- Vibulius Doryphorus, dedicated a tomb for his wife, Valeria Victorina, at Asseria in Dalmatia, dating between the middle of the second century, and the end of the third.
- Vibullius M. f. Felix, a native of Ateste in Venetia and Histria, was a member of the praetorian armourers' guild at Rome, during the late second century, or at the beginning of the third.

=== Vibulii Rufi ===
- Lucius Vibullius Rufus, a Roman Senator, was a trusted friend of Pompeius, who sent him to raise troops in Picenum at the beginning of the Civil War in 49 BC. Unable to make headway, Rufus took charge of the garrison of Corfinium, where he was captured by Caesar, but dismissed unharmed. He was captured and pardoned a second time when Caesar defeated the Pompeians in Spain, then sent as an envoy to Pompeius in 48. Remaining loyal to his friend, Rufus delivered intelligence concerning Caesar's arrival in Greece.
- (Lucius Vibullius) Rufus, married Claudia Alcia, the daughter, or perhaps sister, of Tiberius Claudius Hipparchus. He was the father of Vibullia Alcia Agrippina, who married Tiberius Claudius Atticus Herodes, either her uncle or her cousin, and probably also of Lucius Vibullius Rufus, who married Herodes' sister, Claudia Athenais.
- Vibullia (L. f.) Alcia Agrippina, the wife of Tiberius Claudius Atticus Herodes, consul in AD 133, who was either her uncle or cousin. Their sons were the sophist Herodes Atticus and Tiberius Claudius Atticus Herodianus.
- Lucius Vibullius (L. f.) Rufus, probably the son of Vibullius Rufus and Claudia Alcia, married Claudia Athenais, either his aunt or cousin. They were the parents of Lucius Vibullius Hipparchus Vibullius Rufus, Archon of Athens in AD 118 and 119, and of Vibullius Rufus, whose son was adopted by his cousin Herodes Atticus.
- Lucius Vibullius Hipparchus Tiberius Claudius Ti. f. Atticus Herodes, (Note: Despite the order of his names, he was technically a Claudius, and descended from the Vibulii through his mother, but several members of his family had married into the Vibullia gens, who may have been considered more authentically Roman. The Claudii Attici had only obtained Roman citizenship a few generations earlier, and were not directly descended from the ancient Claudia gens.) better known simply as "Herodes Atticus", was a sophist and scholar, and consul in AD 143. Although he had several children by his wife, Appia Annia Regilla, he adopted his cousin, Lucius Vibullius Claudius Herodes.
- (Lucius Vibullius L. f. L. n.) Rufus, the son of Lucius Vibullius Rufus and Claudia Athenais, attested from an inscription as the father of Lucius Vibullius Claudius Herodes.
- Lucius Vibullius L. f. (L. n.) Hipparchus, Archon of Athens in AD 118 and 119, was the son of Lucius Vibullius Rufus and Claudia Athenais. His son, Publius Aelius Vibullius Rufus, was Archon of Athens in 143 and 144. He might also have been the father of Vibullius Polydeucion.
- Lucius Vibullius Claudius Herodes, the son of (Lucius Vibullius) Rufus, and grandson of Lucius Vibullius Rufus and Claudia Athenais, was adopted by his cousin, the sophist Herodes Atticus, consul in AD 143.
- Publius Aelius Vibullius L. f. L. n. Rufus, the son of Lucius Vibullius Hipparchus, was Archon of Athens in AD 143 and 144.
- Vibullius Polydeucion, perhaps the son of Lucius Vibullius Hipparchus, and brother of Publius Aelius Vibullius Rufus, both Archons of Athens.
- Lucius Vibullius P. f. L. n. Hipparchus, the son of Publius Aelius Vibullius Rufus, Archon of Athens in AD 143 and 144, married a daughter of his cousin, Herodes Atticus, although it is uncertain whether his wife was Elpinice or Athenais.
- (Vibullia) Athenais, the daughter of Lucius Vibullius Hipparchus, and granddaughter of Herodes Atticus.
- Vibullia Regilla, buried at Portus in Latium, along with her husband, Quintus Septueius Abascantus, in a tomb dedicated by their daughter, Septueia Vera, dating from the middle portion of the second century.

=== Undated Vibullii ===
- Vibullia C. f., the wife of Lucius Prusinius, and mother of Lucius Prusinius and Prusinia, all buried in a family sepulchre at Casinum in Latium, built by her sons, Marcus and Gaius Prusinius.
- Gaius Vibulius P. f. Adauctus, buried at Corinth.
- Vibullia Amanda, dedicated a tomb at Casinum for her son, Gaius Futius Successus.
- Marcus Vibullius Augurinus, along with his children, Victorina, Albinianus, Anulinus, and Lucillia, dedicated a tomb at Rome for his wife, Lucilia Lucilliana, aged thirty-six years, four months, and twenty-seven days.
- Titus Vibullius T. f. T. n. M. pron. Cornutus Pius, a conductor, or independent businessman, named in an inscription from Heliopolis in Syria.
- Vibullius Fortunatus, buried at Catina in Sicily, aged sixty.
- Lucius Vibullius Gemellus, together with his brother, Lucius Vibullius Proculinus, dedicated a tomb at Casinum for their mother, Alfia Primitiva, aged forty-five years, ten months, and twenty days.
- Vibullius Impetratus, buried at Mactaris in Africa Proconsularis, in a tomb dedicated by Faustilla.
- Vibullia Pardala, buried at Rome, with a monument from Nymphodotus.
- Vibullius Priscianus, buried at Rome, along with his grandson, Claudius Bacchius, in a tomb built by his wife, Regulia Materna.
- Lucius Vibullius Proculinus, together with his brother, Lucius Vibullius Gemellus, dedicated a tomb at Casinum for their mother, Alfia Primitiva.
- Marcus Vibullius P. f. Proculus, a youth buried at Albingaunum in Liguria, aged seventeen, with a monument dedicated by his mother, Cornelia Procula.
- Vibullius Verus, known from an inscription of Gallia Narbonensis.

== See also ==
- List of Roman gentes

== Bibliography ==
- Marcus Tullius Cicero, Epistulae ad Atticum, Epistulae ad Quintum Fratrem.
- Gaius Julius Caesar, Commentarii de Bello Civili (Commentaries on the Civil War).
- Titus Livius (Livy), History of Rome.
- Publius Cornelius Tacitus, Annales.
- Lucius Cassius Dio, Roman History.
- Dictionary of Greek and Roman Biography and Mythology, William Smith, ed., Little, Brown and Company, Boston (1849).
- Theodor Mommsen et alii, Corpus Inscriptionum Latinarum (The Body of Latin Inscriptions, abbreviated CIL), Berlin-Brandenburgische Akademie der Wissenschaften (1853–present).
- René Cagnat et alii, L'Année épigraphique (The Year in Epigraphy, abbreviated AE), Presses Universitaires de France (1888–present).
- August Pauly, Georg Wissowa, et alii, Realencyclopädie der Classischen Altertumswissenschaft (Scientific Encyclopedia of the Knowledge of Classical Antiquities, abbreviated RE or PW), J. B. Metzler, Stuttgart (1894–1980).
- George Davis Chase, "The Origin of Roman Praenomina", in Harvard Studies in Classical Philology, vol. VIII, pp. 103–184 (1897).
- Paul von Rohden, Elimar Klebs, & Hermann Dessau, Prosopographia Imperii Romani (The Prosopography of the Roman Empire, abbreviated PIR), Berlin (1898).
- Memoirs of the American Academy in Rome, University of Michigan Press (1915–present).
- Emile Espérandieu, Inscriptions Latines de Gaule (Narbonnaise) (Latin Inscriptions from Gallia Narbonensis), Ernest Leroux, Paris (1929).
- Allen Brown West, "Latin Inscriptions, 1896–1926", in Corinth: Results of Excavations Conducted by the American School of Classical Studies at Athens, vol. VIII, part II, Harvard University Press, Cambridge, Massachusetts (1931).
- T. Robert S. Broughton, The Magistrates of the Roman Republic, American Philological Association (1952–1986).
- Hilding Thylander, Inscriptions du port d'Ostie, Lund (1952).
- John Harvey Kent, "The Inscriptions, 1926–1950", in Corinth: Results of Excavations Conducted by the American School of Classical Studies at Athens, vol. VIII, part III, Princeton, New Jersey (1966).
- Olli Salomies, Adoptive and Polyonymous Nomenclature in the Roman Empire, Societas Scientiarum Fennica, Helsinki (1992).
