= Appius Annius Trebonius Gallus =

Appius Annius Trebonius Gallus may refer to:

- Appius Annius Trebonius Gallus (consul suffectus)
- Appius Annius Trebonius Gallus (consul 108)
