= Annia gens =

Ancient Roman family

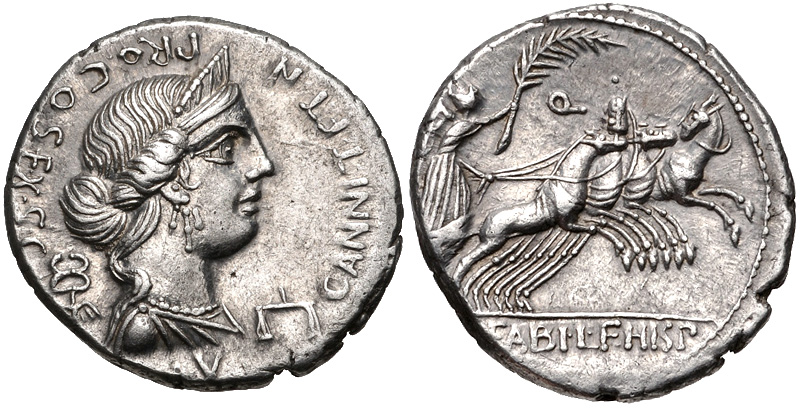
Denarius of Gaius Annius, minted c. 81 BC, on his way to fight Sertorius. The obverse depicts Anna Perenna.

The gens Annia was a plebeian family at ancient Rome. Livy mentions a Lucius Annius, praetor of the Roman colony of Setia, in 340 BC, and other Annii are mentioned at Rome during this period. Members of this gens held various positions of authority from the time of the Second Punic War, and Titus Annius Luscus attained the consulship in 153 BC. In the second century AD, the Annii gained the Empire itself; Marcus Aurelius was descended from this family.

== Origin ==
The Annii claimed a descent from the goddess Anna Perenna, the sister of Dido, portrayed on the coins of Gaius Annius Luscus. The nomen Annius was classified by Chase as one of Picentine origin, and there is an attested South Picene name aninis which is perhaps comparable to the name of the Roman gens. However, the first of the Annii that appears in history (in 340 BC) was the praetor of Setia, which was originally a Volscian town, though it was captured by the Romans in 382 BC. Both the Picentes and the Volsci spoke Umbrian languages, so it may be that Annius was a member of an old Volscian family, rather than one of the Latin colonists, on whose behalf he spoke. It seems the gens acquired the citizenship soon after, since a Roman senator named Annius is recorded a generation later.

== Praenomina ==
The main families of the Annii at Rome used the praenomina Titus, Marcus, Lucius, and Gaius. Other names occur infrequently, although in imperial times several of the Annii used Appius, an otherwise uncommon praenomen chiefly associated with the Claudii.

== Branches and cognomina ==
A number of Annii during the Republic bore no cognomen. The main family of the Annii was surnamed Luscus, "bleary-eyed" or, "one-eyed". One member of this family bore the additional surname Rufus, probably in reference to his red hair. A variety of surnames were borne by individual Annii, including Asellus, a diminutive of asinus, a donkey; Bassus, stout; Cimber, one of the Cimbri; Faustus, fortunate; Gallus, a Gaul or cockerel; and Pollio, a polisher. Bellienus or Billienus, sometimes described as a cognomen of the Annii, was in fact a separate gens, although Cicero refers to a Gaius Annius Bellienus; it is not certain which of the Bellieni mentioned below actually belong to the Annia gens.

== Members ==
This list includes abbreviated praenomina. For an explanation of this practice, see filiation.

=== Annii Lusci ===
- Marcus Annius (Luscus), triumvir for the founding of colonies in Cisalpine Gaul in 218 BC, obliged by a sudden rising of the Boii to take refuge in Mutina.
- Titus Annius M. f. Luscus, sent as an envoy to Perseus in 172 BC, and triumvir for augmenting the colony at Aquileia in 169.
- Titus Annius T. f. M. n. Luscus, consul in 153 BC, an orator who opposed Tiberius Gracchus in 133.
- Titus Annius T. f. T. n. Luscus, surnamed Rufus, praetor in 131 BC, and subsequently governor of Sicily. He was consul in 128 BC.
- Gaius Annius T. f. T. n. Luscus, commander of the garrison at Leptis Magna under Metellus Numidicus during the Jugurthine War in 108 BC, and later sent by Sulla against Sertorius in 81, whom he compelled to retire to Carthago Nova.
- Annia T. f. T. n., the wife of Gaius Papius Celsus and mother of Titus Annius Milo.
- Titus Annius T. f. Milo, the son of Celsus and Annia, was adopted by his grandfather, Titus Annius Luscus, whose name he assumed. He was tribune of the plebs in 57 BC, and became a staunch opponent of Publius Clodius Pulcher, for whose murder he was unsuccessfully defended by Cicero in 52.

=== Annii Bellieni ===
- Lucius Annius C. f. Bellienus, praetor in 105 BC, served under Gaius Marius in the war against Jugurtha and Bocchus.
- Gaius Annius Bellienus, legate of Marcus Fonteius in Gallia Narbonensis, circa 74 BC.
- Lucius Annius Bellienus, uncle of Catiline, ordered by Sulla to kill Quintus Lucretius Afella, and condemned in 64 BC.
- Lucius Annius Bellienus, whose house was burnt down after the murder of Caesar in 44 BC.

=== Annii Polliones ===
- Gaius Annius (Pollio), father of the Pollio attested from the columbarium of his freedmen. Maybe the Annius who was triumvir monetalis in 9 BC.
- Gaius Annius C. f. Pollio, a senator known from the columbarium of his freedmen. Believed to be the father of Gaius Annius Pollio, consul in 21 or 22. Maybe the Annius who was triumvir monetalis in 9 BC.
- Gaius Annius C. f. C. n. Pollio, consul suffectus in either AD 21 or 22. Accused of majestas during the reign of Tiberius.
- Gaius Annius C. f. C. n. Pollio, son of the consul of 21 or 22, himself consul suffectus circa AD 66. An intimate friend of Nero, banished after being accused of participating in the conspiracy of Gaius Calpurnius Piso.
- Annia C. f. C. n., daughter of the consul of 21 or 22 AD, wife of an Atratinus, possibly either a Sempronius Atratinus or Marcus Asinius Atratinus the consul of 89
- Lucius Annius C. f. C. n. Vinicianus, younger son of the consul of 21 or 22, and one of the men involved in the assassination of Caligula.
- (Lucius) Annius L. f. C. n. Vinicianus, son of the conspirator against Caligula, was involved in a plot against Nero. He took his own life rather than defend himself.
- (Gaius) Annius L. f. C. n. Pollio, son of the elder Vinicianus and husband of Marcia Servilia.

=== Annii Galli ===
- Appius Annius Gallus, consul suffectus in AD 67 and Roman general under the emperors Otho and Vespasian.
- Appius Annius (Ap. f.) Trebonius Gallus, perhaps the son of Appius Annius Gallus, the consul of AD 67; consul in 108.
- Appius Annius Ap. f. (Ap. n.) Trebonius Gallus, consul in AD 139. father of:
- Appius Annius Ap. f. Ap. n. Atilius Bradua, consul in AD 160.
- Appia Annia Ap. f. Ap. n. Regilla Atilia Caucidia Tertulla, better known as Aspasia Annia Regilla, daughter of the consul of AD 139, married Herodes Atticus.

=== Annii Veri ===
- Marcus Annius Verus, great-grandfather of the emperor Marcus Aurelius, was a senator from a family that had risen to prominence through olive oil production at Ucubi in Hispania.
- Marcus Annius M. f. Verus, the grandfather of Marcus Aurelius, obtained the consulship in an uncertain year under Domitian, and twice under Hadrian, in AD 121 and 126. He married Rupilia Faustina.
- Annia M. f. M. n. Galeria Faustina, better known as Faustina Major or Faustina the Elder, was the wife of Antoninus Pius, and Roman empress from AD 138 to 140; Marcus Aurelius was her nephew.
- Marcus Annius M. f. M. n. Libo, the uncle of Marcus Aurelius, was consul in AD 128 and 161.
- Marcus Annius M. f. M. n. Verus, the father of Marcus Aurelius, attained the praetorship, but died circa AD 124, leaving his children to be raised by their paternal grandfather.
- Marcus Annius M. f. M. n. Sabinus Libo, son of Marcus Annius Libo, the consul of AD 128 and 161.
- Annia M. f. M. n. Fundania Faustina, daughter of Marcus Annius Libo, the consul of AD 128 and 161, married Titus Pomponius Proculus Vitrasius Pollio. She was later murdered on the orders of her cousin, the emperor Commodus.
- Marcus Annius M. f. M. n. Verus, afterwards Marcus Aurelius, emperor from AD 161 to 180.
- Annia M. f. M. n. Cornificia Faustina, the sister of Marcus Aurelius.
- Marcus Annius Flavius M. f. M. n. M. pron. Libo, consul in 204 AD, he was probably the son of Marcus Annius Sabinus Libo.
- Marcus Annius Verus Caesar, the twelfth son of Marcus Aurelius.
- Annia Faustina, the granddaughter of Annia Cornificia Faustina.
- Annia Aurelia Faustina, the daughter of Annia Faustina, married the emperor Elagabalus.

=== Others ===
- Lucius Annius, a native of Setia, was praetor of the Latin League in 340 BC. He demanded that the Latins be treated as half the Roman state, and that one of the consuls and half the senate be chosen from among them. On receiving the indignant reply from the senators and the consul Titus Manlius, he is said to have harangued Capitoline Jupiter. He then fell and struck his head while leaving the senate house, though sources differ as to whether he died.
- Lucius Annius, a senator in 307 BC, who was expelled from the senate by the censors after repudiating his wife without previously consulting the consilium domesticum.
- Annius, a freedman, and reportedly the father of Gnaeus Flavius, curule aedile in 304 BC.
- Gaius Annius C. f., a quaestor or praetor during the third century BC.
- Annius, a Campanian ambassador to Rome in 216 BC, demanded that one of the consuls should henceforth be a Campanian.
- Gaius Annius C. f., a senator in 135 BC.
- Lucius Annius L. f., a senator in 135 BC.
- Gaius Annius C. f., a senator in 129 BC, should probably be distinguished from the Gaius Annius of 135, who was a member of the tribus Camilia, while the senator of 129 was from Arniensis.
- Marcus Annius P. f., quaestor in Macedonia circa 119 BC, won a victory over the Celts who had killed the propraetor Sextus Pompeius.
- Lucius Annius, tribune of the plebs in 110 BC, possibly the son of Lucius Annius, senator in 135, wished to continue in office the next year, but was resisted by his colleagues.
- Publius Annius, a military tribune in 87 BC, murdered Marcus Antonius, the orator, and brought his head to Marius.
- Annia, the wife of Lucius Cornelius Cinna, who died in 84 BC, and afterwards of Marcus Pupius Piso Frugi Calpurnianus, whom Sulla compelled to divorce her, because of her former marriage to Cinna.
- Publius Annius Asellus, a senator who died in 75 BC, leaving his only daughter as his heiress. His property was seized by the praetor Verres. He was quaestor in Sicily soon before.
- Quintus Annius Chilo, a senator, and one of Catiline's conspirators in 63 BC.
- Lucius Annius, a quaestor in Sicily before 50 BC.
- Sextus Annius, a quaestor in Sicily before 50 BC.
- Quintus Annius, an officer of Sextus Pompey in Sicily between 43 and 36 BC.
- Gaius Annius Cimber, a supporter of Marcus Antonius in 43 BC.
- Annius Rufus, governor of Judea from AD 12 to 15.
- Annius Faustus, a man of equestrian rank, and one of the informers (delatores) in the reign of Nero, was condemned by the Senate in AD 69, on the accusation of Vibius Crispus.
- Marcus Annius Afrinus, consul suffectus in AD 66.
- Annius Bassus, commander of a legion under Marcus Antonius Primus in AD 70.
- Publius Annius Florus, a poet and rhetorician from the time of Domitian to Hadrian, wrote a dialogue titled Vergilius orator an poeta. He is possibly identical with the historian Annaeus Florus.
- Lucius Annius Arrianus, consul in AD 243.

== See also ==
- List of Roman gentes

== Bibliography ==
- Marcus Tullius Cicero, In Verrem, Philippicae, Pro Fonteio.
- Clackson, James; Horrocks, Geoffrey (2007). The Blackwell history of the Latin language. Oxford: Blackwell Publishing. ISBN 978-1-4051-6209-8. OCLC 473646442.
- Gaius Sallustius Crispus (Sallust), Bellum Jugurthinum (The Jugurthine War), Bellum Catilinae (The Conspiracy of Catiline).
- Titus Livius (Livy), History of Rome.
- Marcus Velleius Paterculus, Compendium of Roman History.
- Valerius Maximus, Factorum ac Dictorum Memorabilium (Memorable Facts and Sayings).
- Quintus Asconius Pedianus, Commentarius in Oratio Ciceronis In Toga Candida (Commentary on Cicero's Oration In Toga Candida).
- Publius Cornelius Tacitus, Annales, Historiae.
- Plutarchus, Lives of the Noble Greeks and Romans.
- Aulus Gellius, Noctes Atticae (Attic Nights).
- Dictionary of Greek and Roman Biography and Mythology, William Smith, ed., Little, Brown and Company, Boston (1849).
- Theodor Mommsen et alii, Corpus Inscriptionum Latinarum (The Body of Latin Inscriptions, abbreviated CIL), Berlin-Brandenburgische Akademie der Wissenschaften (1853–present).
- Wilhelm Dittenberger, Sylloge Inscriptionum Graecarum (Collection of Greek Inscriptions, abbreviated SIG), Leipzig (1883).
- Ernest Babelon, Description historique et chronologique des monnaies de la République romaine, Rollin et Feuardent, Paris (1885).
- George Davis Chase, "The Origin of Roman Praenomina", in Harvard Studies in Classical Philology, vol. VIII, pp. 103–184 (1897).
- Harold Mattingly, Edward Allen Sydenham, C. H. V. Sutherland et alii, The Roman Imperial Coinage, London (1923–1984).
- T. Robert S. Broughton, The Magistrates of the Roman Republic, American Philological Association (1952–1986).
- Ronald Syme, "Missing Senators", Historia: Zeitschrift für Alte Geschichte, Bd. 4, H. 1 (1955), pp. 52–71.
- Robert K. Sherk, "The Text of the Senatus Consultum De Agro Pergameno", in Greek, Roman, and Byzantine Studies, vol. 7, pp. 361–369 (1966).
- Michael Crawford, Roman Republican Coinage, Cambridge University Press (1974, 2001).
- John C. Traupman, The New College Latin & English Dictionary, Bantam Books, New York (1995).
- Anthony R. Birley, The Roman Government of Britain, Oxford University Press (2005).
- Sarah B. Pomeroy, The Murder of Regilla: a Case of Domestic Violence in Antiquity, Harvard University Press (2007).
