= AD 108 =

108 in various calendars
- Gregorian calendar: 108; CVIII
- Ab urbe condita: 861
- Assyrian calendar: 4858
- Balinese saka calendar: 29–30
- Bengali calendar: −486 – −485
- Berber calendar: 1058
- Buddhist calendar: 652
- Burmese calendar: −530
- Byzantine calendar: 5616–5617
- Chinese calendar: 丁未年 (Fire Goat); 2805 or 2598 — to — 戊申年 (Earth Monkey); 2806 or 2599
- Coptic calendar: −176 – −175
- Discordian calendar: 1274
- Ethiopian calendar: 100–101
- Hebrew calendar: 3868–3869
- Hindu calendars
- Vikram Samvat: 164–165
- Shaka Samvat: 29–30
- Kali Yuga: 3208–3209
- Holocene calendar: 10108
- Iranian calendar: 514 BP – 513 BP
- Islamic calendar: 530 BH – 529 BH
- Javanese calendar: N/A
- Julian calendar: 108; CVIII
- Korean calendar: 2441
- Minguo calendar: 1804 before ROC 民前1804年
- Nanakshahi calendar: −1360
- Seleucid era: 419/420 AG
- Thai solar calendar: 650–651
- Tibetan calendar: མེ་མོ་ལུག་ལོ་ (female Fire-Sheep); 234 or −147 or −919 — to — ས་ཕོ་སྤྲེ་ལོ་ (male Earth-Monkey); 235 or −146 or −918

Year 108 (CVIII) was a leap year starting on Saturday of the Julian calendar. In Rome at the time, it was known as the Year of the Consulship of Trebonius and Bradua (or, less frequently, year 861 Ab urbe condita). The denomination 108 for this year has been used since the early medieval period, when the Anno Domini calendar era became the prevalent method in Europe for naming years.

== Events ==
=== By place ===
==== Roman Empire ====
- Appius Annius Trebonius Gallus and Marcus Atilius Bradua become Roman Consuls.

=== By topic ===
==== Arts and sciences ====
- Tacitus writes Histories, which covers the period from AD 69 to AD 96.
- The Hypogeum of Yarhai, an underground tomb from the Syrian city of Palmyra dedicated to the family of Yarhai, is built.

== Deaths ==
- Hyacinth of Caesarea, Christian martyr
