= Appius Annius Atilius Bradua =

2nd century AD Roman senator and consul

Appius Annius Atilius Bradua was a Senator of the Roman Empire in the 2nd century AD.

Annius Bradua was born and raised in an aristocratic family of consular rank and was a member of the gens Annia. He was a member of the venerable family of the Annii Regilli. Regilli means 'Little Queen'.

His father was Appius Annius Trebonius Gallus. Annius Gallus was a distinguished Senator and one of the serving consuls in the year 139 and his mother was Atilia Caucidia Tertulla. His sister, Appia Annia Regilla Atilia Caucidia Tertulla, otherwise known as Aspasia Annia Regilla, married the prominent Greek Herodes Atticus.

The paternal grandparents of Annius Bradua were the Senator Appius Annius Trebonius Gallus and his wife, whose name is unknown, while his maternal grandparents were the Senator and Governor Marcus Appius Bradua and Caucidia Tertulla. His mother's brother was Marcus Atilius Metilius Bradua Caucidius Tertullus...Bassus. His uncle served as a polyonymous Proconsul of the Africa Province under the Emperor Antoninus Pius (138-161). His grandfathers were both consular colleagues in the year 108.

Through his paternal grandfather, Annius Bradua was related to the Senator Marcus Annius Verus, who was a brother-in-law of Hadrian and father of Antoninus Pius' wife Faustina the Elder, who was, in turn, the mother of the Empress Faustina the Younger and aunt of Marcus Aurelius.

In the year 160, Annius Bradua served as an ordinary consul, during which time, his sister, eight months pregnant with her sixth child, was kicked to death in the abdomen by a freedman of Herodes Atticus named Alcimedon. Annius Bradua brought charges in Rome against his brother-in-law, alleging that he had been responsible for her death; however, Herodes Atticus was exonerated of the charge by Marcus Aurelius, his student, who would become emperor the following year.

== Sources ==
- http://www.vroma.org/~bmcmanus/women_civicdonors.html
- A. R. Birley, The Roman Government of Britain, Oxford University Press, 2005
- S. B. Pomeroy, The murder of Regilla: a case of domestic violence in antiquity, Harvard University Press, 2007

Political offices
Preceded by Plautius Quintillus, and Marcus Statius Priscus Licinius Italicus	Consul of the Roman Empire; 160 with Titus Clodius Vibius Varus	Succeeded by Marcus Aurelius Caesar III, and Lucius Aelius Aurelius Commodus II
