= Athenais (daughter of Herodes Atticus) =

Roman noblewoman (143-161)

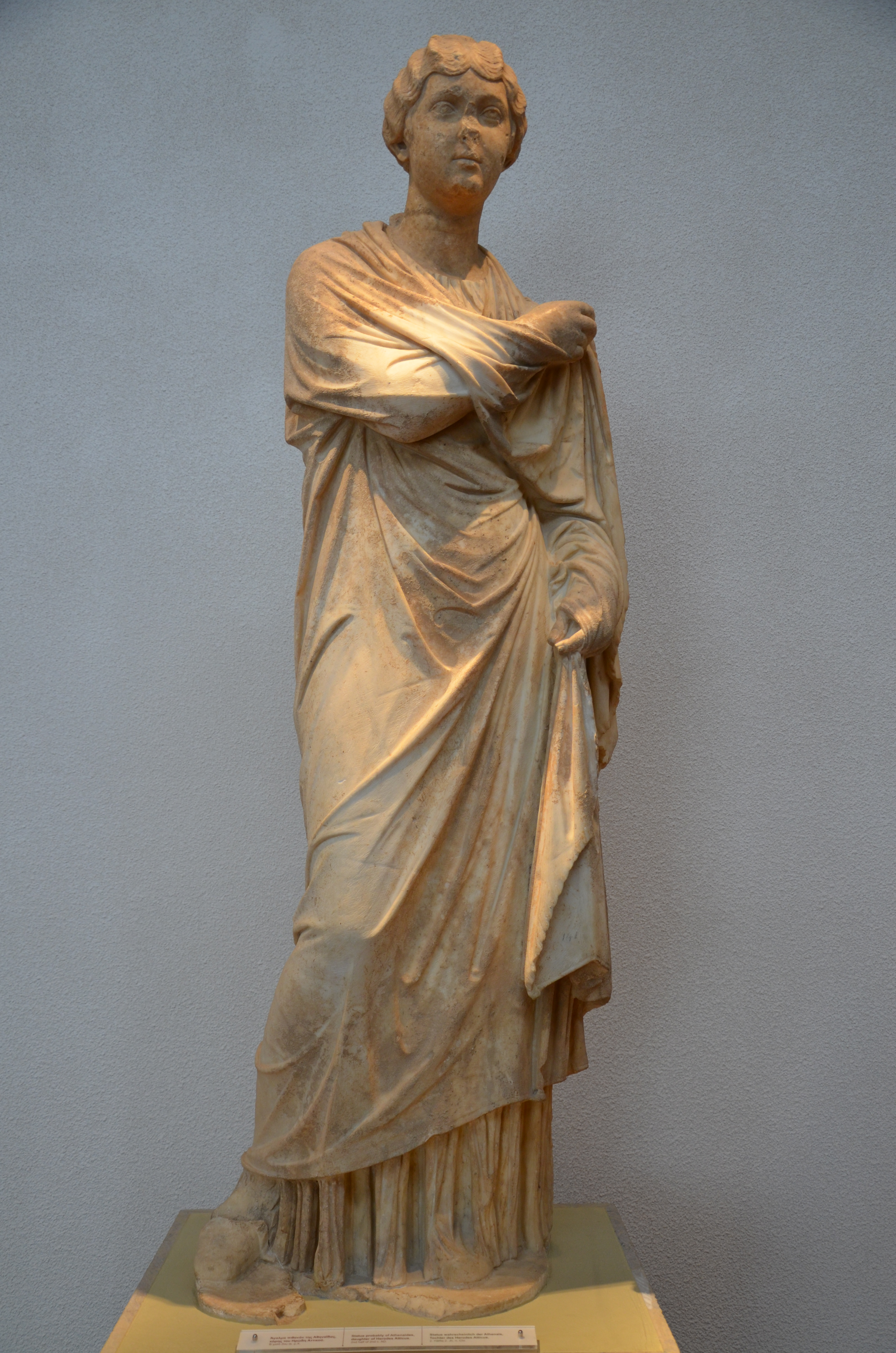
Statue, believed to be of Athenais, from the Nymphaeum of Herodes Atticus at Olympia, dating from between 149 and 153 AD, Olympia Archaeological Museum, Greece.

Marcia Annia Claudia Alcia Athenais Gavidia Latiaria, (Ancient Greek: Μαρκία Κλαυδία Άλκία Άθηναΐς Γαβιδία Λατιαρία) otherwise most commonly known as Athenais (Ancient Greek: Αθηναΐς) (c. 143-161) was a Roman noblewoman of Greek Athenian and Italian Roman descent who lived in the Roman Empire.

== Ancestry and Family ==
Athenais was born to a distinguished and very rich family of consular rank. She was the second daughter of the Athenian Roman Senator, Sophist Herodes Atticus and the Roman highly aristocratic, influential noblewoman Aspasia Annia Regilla.

The paternal grandparents of Athenais were the Roman Senator Tiberius Claudius Atticus Herodes and the wealthy heiress Vibullia Alcia Agrippina, while her maternal grandparents were the Roman Senator, Consul Appius Annius Trebonius Gallus and the aristocratic woman Atilia Caucidia Tertulla. Her paternal uncle was Tiberius Claudius Atticus Herodianus, while her paternal aunt was Claudia Tisamenis. The maternal uncle of Athenais was Appius Annius Atilius Bradua who served as an ordinary consul in 160.

Through her maternal grandfather, Athenais was a relative to the Roman Empress Faustina the Elder, wife of the Roman Emperor Antoninus Pius. Faustina the Elder was the mother of Roman Empress Faustina the Younger and aunt of Roman Emperor Marcus Aurelius. Thus she was a relative to the family of Faustina the Younger and Marcus Aurelius.

== Life ==
Athenais was born in the year of her father's consulship in Rome. She was probably born in the villa that was owned by her parents on the Appian Way. After her father's consulship, Athenais and her family left Italy and moved to Greece, where they became a part of the highest Greek circle of society, particularly in Athens. Athenais was directly cut off from her immediate family and relatives in Italy.

The parents of Athenais erected a great outdoor nymphaeum (a monumental fountain) at Olympia, Greece. The monumental fountain features statues and honors members of the ruling imperial family, including members of her family and relatives of her parents. Among the statues was a bust of Athenais which is on display at the Archaeological Museum of Olympia.

The parents of Athenais had betrothed her to an Athenian aristocrat called Lucius Vibullius Rufus. Lucius Vibullius Rufus and Athenais were paternal second cousins. Lucius Vibullius Rufus was previously married and had at least one son called Lucius Vibullius. Lucius Vibullius was adopted by Herodes Atticus as his son sometime after 160 and was known as Lucius Vibullius Claudius Herodes.

In 160 Athenais married Lucius Vibullius Rufus. In 161, Athenais bore a son called Lucius Vibullius Hipparchus. Shortly after the birth of their son, Athenais died.

== Sources ==
- Σ. Θ. Φωτείνου, Ολυμπία - Οδηγός Αρχαιοτήτων, Συγκρότημα Γραφικών Τεχνών, Άνω Καλαμάκι Αθήνα, 1972
- Graindor, P., Un milliardaire antique, Ayers Company Publishers, 1979
- Burn, A.R., The Penguin History of Greece, Penguin Books, 1990
- Wilson, N.G., Encyclopedia of Ancient Greece, Routledge, 2006
- Pomeroy, S.B., The murder of Regilla: a case of domestic violence in antiquity, Harvard University Press, 2007
- it:Aspasia Annia Regilla
- http://www.vroma.org/~bmcmanus/women_civicdonors.html
- de:Appius Annius Atilius Bradua
