= Titus Clodius Vibius Varus =

Roman senator and consul in 160

Titus Clodius Vibius Varus was a Roman senator who was ordinary consul in AD 160 as the colleague of Appius Annius Atilius Bradua. A bull offering was made to the goddess Cybele for the health of Emperor Antoninus Pius and for the preservation of the Colonia Copia Felix Munatia (now Lyon) on the fifth of December in the year of Vibius' consulate.

In his monograph on naming practices of the first centuries of the Imperial period, Olli Salomies writes confidently that Varus was the son of Titus Vibius Varus, ordinary consul of 134. The scholar also suggests that the gentilicum Clodius and the presence of the uncommon praenomen Titus may indicate his mother was a Clodia, that is a female member of the gens Clodius.

== Epigraphs ==
- CIL XIII, 1751
- CIL XIV, 0244

Political offices
Preceded by Plautius Quintillus, and Marcus Statius Priscus Licinius Italicus	Consul of the Roman Empire; 160 with Appius Annius Atilius Bradua	Succeeded by Marcus Aurelius Caesar III, and Lucius Aelius Aurelius Commodus II
