= Lucius Annius =

Praetor of the Latins in 340 BC

Lucius Annius was a nobleman of ancient Rome of the Annia gens who lived in the 4th century BCE. Annius lived in Setia, a Roman colony (modern Sezze), and was praetor of the Latins in 340, at the time of the Latin War. He was sent as ambassador to Rome to demand for the Latins political equality with the Romans. According to the popular Roman story, Annius dared to say, in the capitol, that he defied the Roman god Jupiter. The historian Livy relates this story, but his recounting contradicts itself on several points (notably on whether or not Annius was even impious toward Jupiter) for reasons that are unclear.

As Annius hurried down the steps of the temple, he fell from the top to the bottom, and knocked himself senseless, possibly dying in the process, though Livy is uncertain on this point as well.

The Roman consul Titus Manlius Torquatus took the fall of Annius to be evidence that the divine power of Jupiter -- numen—was in fact a real phenomenon.
