= Appia Annia Regilla =

Roman noblewoman (125-160)

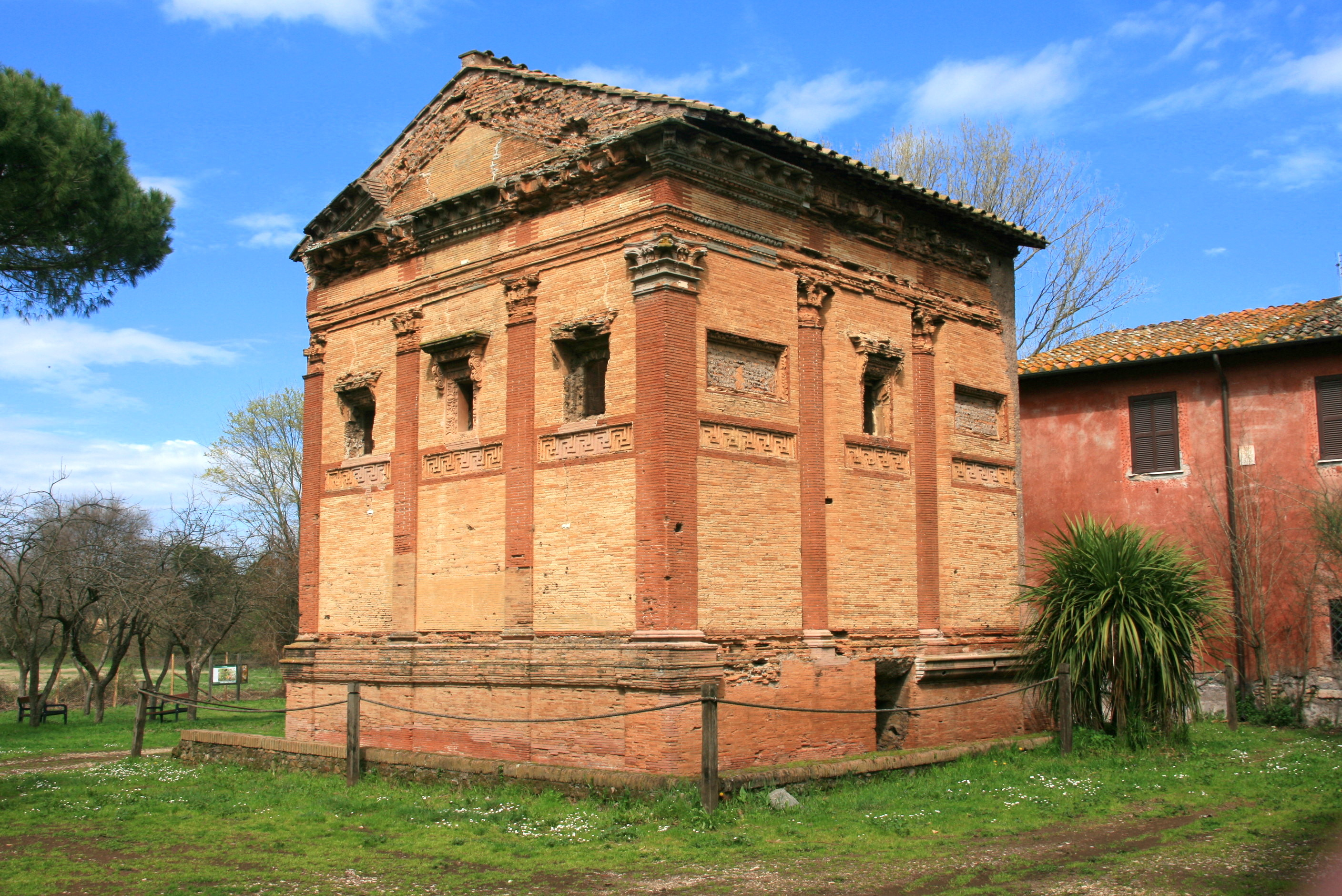
Tomb presumed to be that of Annia Regilla in Rome's Caffarella Park

Appia Annia Regilla, full name Appia Annia Regilla Atilia Caucidia Tertulla (Greek: Ἀππία Ἄννια Ἀτειλία Ῥήγιλλα Καυκιδία Τερτύλλα Ἀππίου Γάλλου θυγάτηρ, 125–160), was a wealthy, aristocratic and influential Roman woman, who was a distant relative of several Roman emperors and empresses. She was the wife of the prominent Greek Herodes Atticus.

== Genealogy ==
Regilla was born into an aristocratic family of consular rank. She was a member of the gens Annia, of the venerable branch of the Annii Regilli. Regilli means "Little Kings". Her father was Appius Annius Trebonius Gallus, a distinguished Roman Senator and one of the serving consuls in the year 139. Her mother was a Roman aristocrat called Atilia Caucidia Tertulla. Regilla's brother, Appius Annius Atilius Bradua, served as an ordinary consul in 160.

The paternal grandparents of Regilla were the senator Appius Annius Trebonius Gallus and his wife, while her maternal grandparents were the Roman Senator, Governor Marcus Atilius Bradua, and the aristocratic woman Caucidia Tertulla. Her mother's brother was Marcus Atilius Metilius Bradua Caucidius Tertullus...Bassus. Her uncle served as a polyonymous Proconsul of the Africa Province under the Roman Emperor Antoninus Pius (138-161). Her grandfathers were consular colleagues for the year 108.

Through her paternal grandfather, Regilla was related to the senator Marcus Annius Verus, who was a brother-in-law of the emperor Hadrian and father of the empress Faustina the Elder, wife of the emperor Antoninus Pius. Faustina the Elder was the mother of the empress Faustina the Younger and aunt of the emperor Marcus Aurelius. Regilla was related to the empress Lucilla, the emperor Commodus, and 3rd-century empress Annia Faustina.

== Marriage and early life with Herodes Atticus ==
During her father's consulship, her father had betrothed Regilla to the prominent Greek Herodes Atticus. Herodes Atticus was a very wealthy, influential, aristocratic Athenian who was a friend to the Roman Emperor Antoninus Pius and was a tutor to the Emperor's adopted son Marcus Aurelius.

Herodes Atticus and Regilla married in 139. Regilla was about 14 years old and Herodes Atticus was 40 years old. When Regilla married Herodes Atticus, Annius Gallus gave his daughter a dowry. With this dowry Regilla bought with her husband a villa on the third mile of the Appian Way just south of Rome and together they controlled a large area of land, which was known as the "Triopio" (from Triopas, King of Thessaly), and later, in medieval times, as Capo di Bove.

Regilla and Herodes Atticus only lived in Italy for a while. In a few years after their marriage, Herodes Atticus, Regilla and their children left Italy and moved to Greece. Although she was directly cut off from her immediate influential family, relatives and friends in Italy, Regilla became a part of the highest Greek circle of society, in particular in Athens.

== Greece and Olympia ==
Regilla spent her remaining years living and travelling around Greece. When she lived in Athens, she was awarded as a priestess of the goddess Tyche and the venerable, long-established office of priestess of Demeter Chamyne in Olympia, Greece in 153. As a priestess of Demeter Chamyne, Regilla was the only woman officially present at the Olympic Games. Regilla sat on or near the altar of Demeter Chamyne on the north side of the stadium in Olympia opposite on the stand of the judges to view the competitions. Being a priestess serving Demeter Chamyne, was a great honor and was quite physically demanding.

Using her own considerable influence and wealth, Regilla erected a great nymphaeum (a monumental fountain) at Olympia. Her husband constructed an aqueduct that fed the nymphaeum. The fountain that Regilla built made the cool refreshing water available to the people in this hot, dusty area. In the centre of the nymphaeum stood a life-sized statue of a bull. On that bull there is an honorific inscription dedicated to Regilla stating: “Regilla, priestess of Demeter, dedicated the water and the things around the water to Zeus”. At Olympia, bulls were sacrificed at the Temple of Zeus, the chief divinity of Olympia.

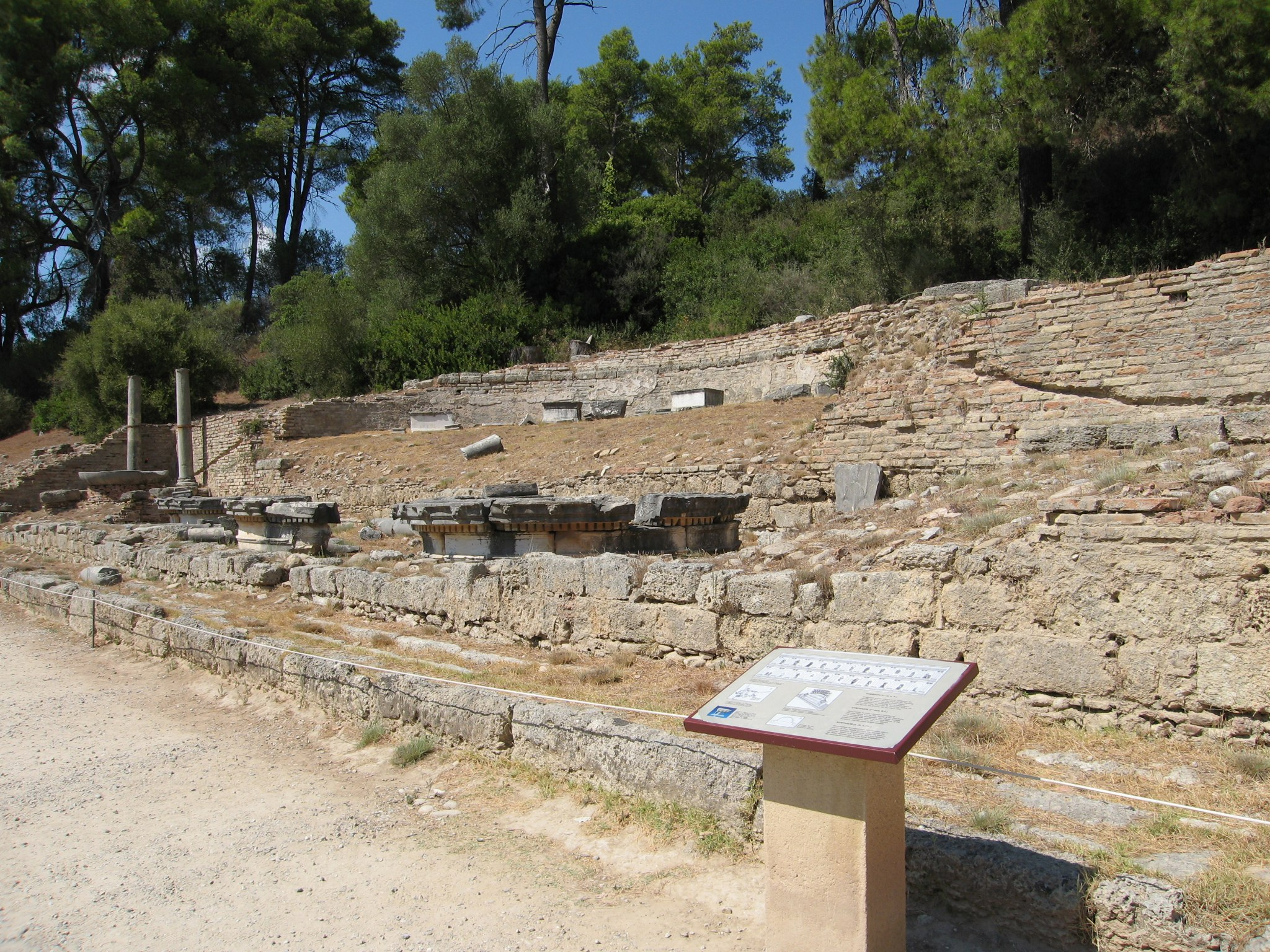
The Nymphaeum of Herodes Atticus and Regilla in Olympia, Greece

The fountain that Regilla built had two levels of niches bearing statues and a columnar façade. Statues have survived from the monument. The central niche on each level held a statue of Zeus, surrounding by portrait statues on each side. The lower level contained the Roman Emperor Antoninus Pius and the ancestors and descendants of the emperor. These included the previous Roman emperor Hadrian; Hadrian's cousin-wife Vibia Sabina; the Roman empress Faustina the Elder; the daughter of the elder Faustina and Antoninus Pius, Faustina the Younger; and Antoninus Pius’ adopted son and son-in-law, the future Roman emperor Marcus Aurelius. This level also showed several children of Marcus Aurelius and Faustina the Younger, in particular their first daughter Annia Galeria Aurelia Faustina (aged about 7 but shown as a young adolescent). On the upper level, paralleling the imperial family, were statues of Regilla, Herodes Atticus, Regilla's parents, Regilla's maternal grandfather and Herodes Atticus’ parents. There were four statues of the children of Regilla and Herodes Atticus, named Elpinice, Athenais, Atticus Bradua and Regillus. The life-sized statue of the bull and the statues from the fountain are on display at the Archaeological Museum of Olympia.

Regilla is depicted in a traditional garment and pose that was suited for noble women, elite matrons and empresses. Due to the fountain's height and gleaming marble, the monument stood out among the surrounding buildings. This fountain brought great honor to Regilla and her family, in particular in emphasizing their links and relations to the ruling imperial family in Rome. It is not known for certain how her contemporaries and peers viewed Regilla and her magnificent donation to Olympia.

In the year that Regilla's brother Appius Annius Atilius Bradua was consul, Regilla, while eight months pregnant, was brutally kicked in the abdomen by a freedman of her husband, a man named Alcimedon. It was alleged that Alcemidon had acted under the orders of Atticus himself. The attack caused her to go into premature labor, killing her, and became the centre of a celebrated trial. Regilla's consul brother brought charges in Rome against his brother-in-law, alleging that Herodes Atticus had ordered her to be beaten to death. Herodes was acquitted after defending himself at the trial. This followed an earlier legal case in which the emperor, Marcus Aurelius, had exonerated Atticus - his old tutor.

== Posthumous honors and legacy ==
After Regilla died, Herodes Atticus was stricken with grief. Herodes Atticus made various dedications to the memory of his wife. He offered Regilla's jewels to the goddesses Ceres and Proserpina. The building that is believed to be her tomb, known as the Temple of Rediculum, was built in the grounds of the villa she owned with Herodes Atticus, in what is now the Caffarella Park close to the Appian Way; the building is still well-preserved. Atticus also had raised on the boundary line of the property two columns bearing this inscription in Greek and Latin:

“To the memory of Annia Regilla, wife of Herodes, the light and soul of the house, to whom these lands once belonged”.

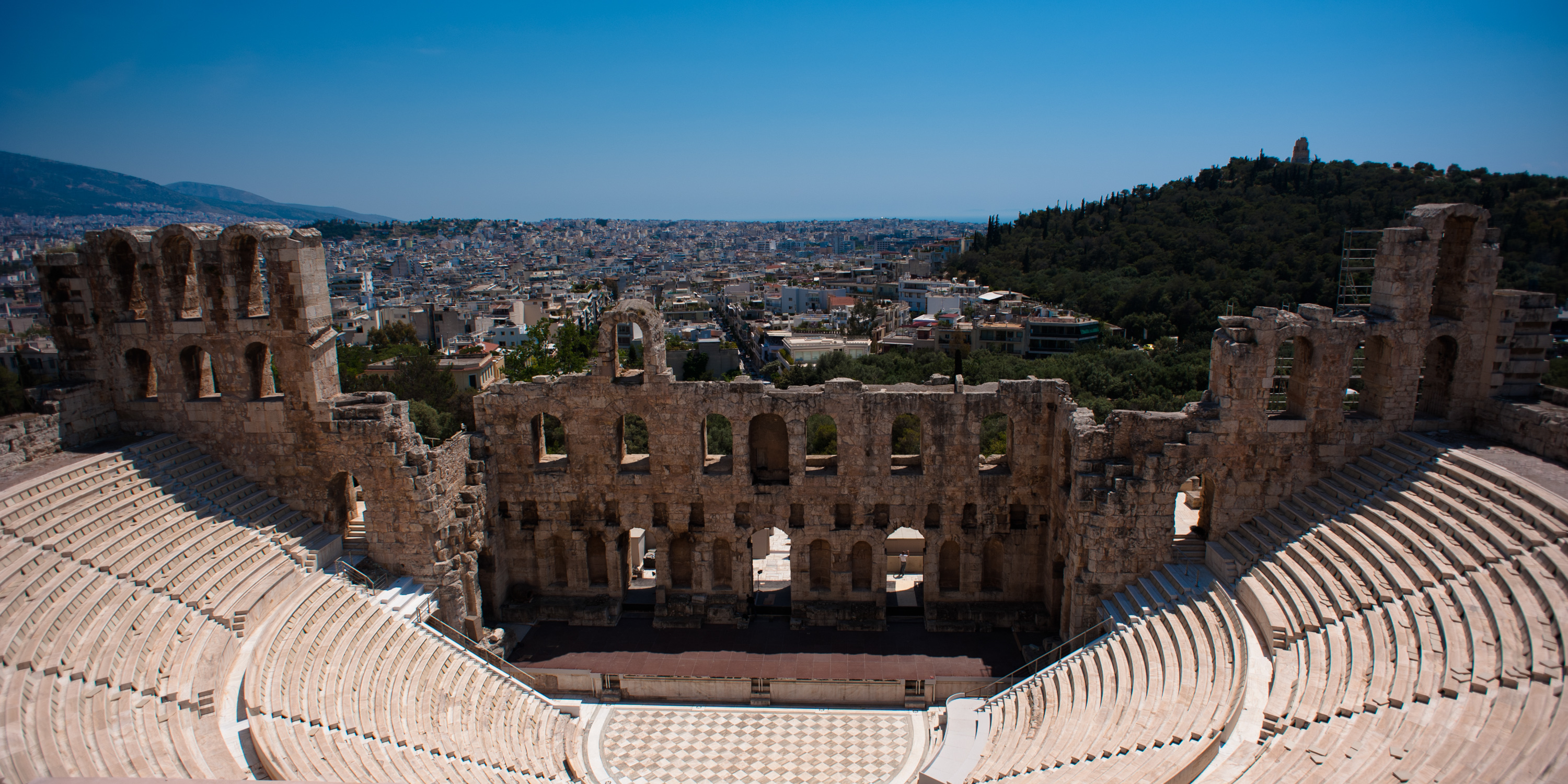
The Odeon of Herodes Atticus built in memory of his wife at the Acropolis in Athens

In an agricultural village located in the Datça Peninsula, a temple was dedicated to Faustina the Younger under the title of the New Ceres, a burial place for the family was placed under the protection of Minerva and Nemesis, and lastly a grove was consecrated to the memory of Regilla. In 161, Herodes Atticus erected a monument in Athens called the Odeon to honor her memory.

From the 2nd century to the present day, Regilla and Herodes Atticus have continued to be considered as great benefactors in Greece, in particular in Athens. Two streets in Athens are named after them—Herodou Attikou Street and Rēgíllēs Street—as is a Square in downtown Athens. The residence of the Prime Minister of Greece is on Rēgíllēs Street, while the Prime Minister's official seat is 19 Herodou Attikou Street. Regilla and Herodes Atticus also have streets named after them in Rome; these are located in the Quarto Miglio suburb close to the area of the Triopio.

== Children ==
Regilla bore Herodes Atticus six children; three survived to adulthood. Their children were:

- Son, Claudius – born and died in 141
- Daughter, Elpinice – born as Appia Annia Claudia Atilia Regilla Elpinice Agrippina Atria Polla, 142-165
- Daughter, Athenais – born as Marcia Annia Claudia Alcia Athenais Gavidia Latiaria, 143-161
- Son, Atticus Bradua – born as Tiberius Claudius Marcus Appius Atilius Bradua Regillus Atticus, born 145
- Son, Regillus – born as Tiberius Claudius Herodes Lucius Vibullius Regillus, 150-155
- Unnamed child who died with Regilla or died even perhaps three months later in 160

== Gallery ==
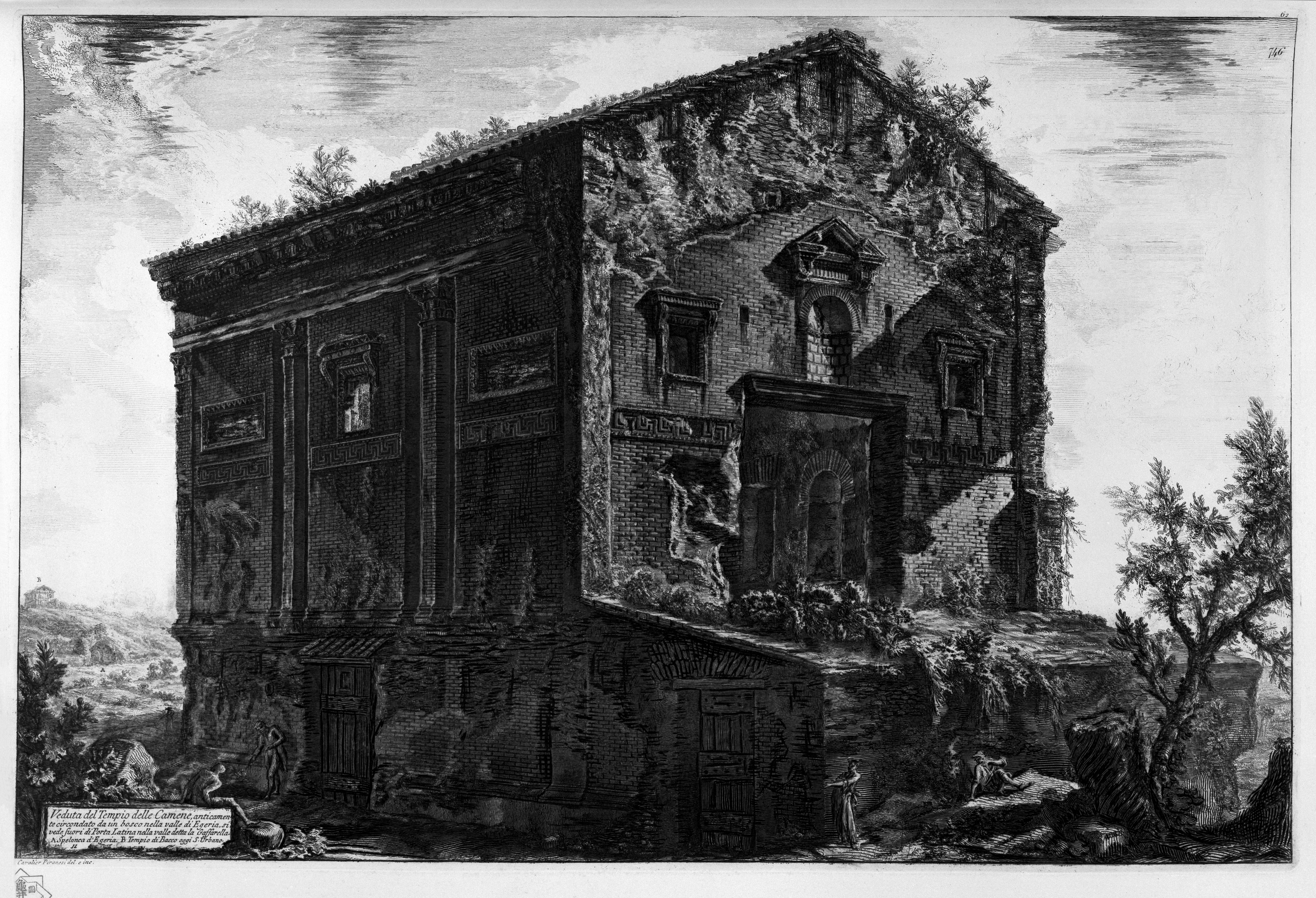
The tomb in an engraving by Piranesi

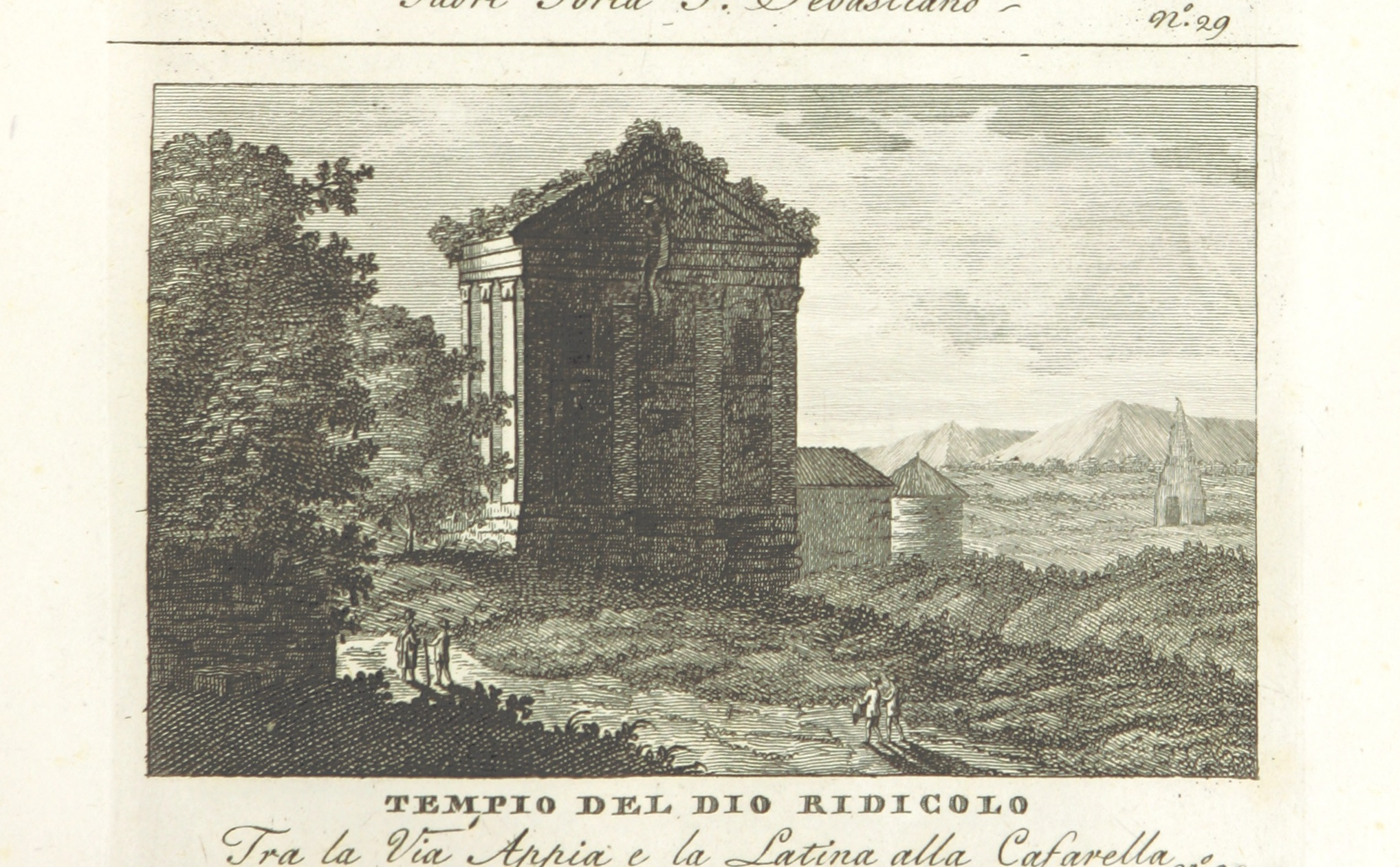
Print in the British Library with the view of the tomb titled "Tempio del Dio Ridicolo" (Temple of the Ridiculous God)

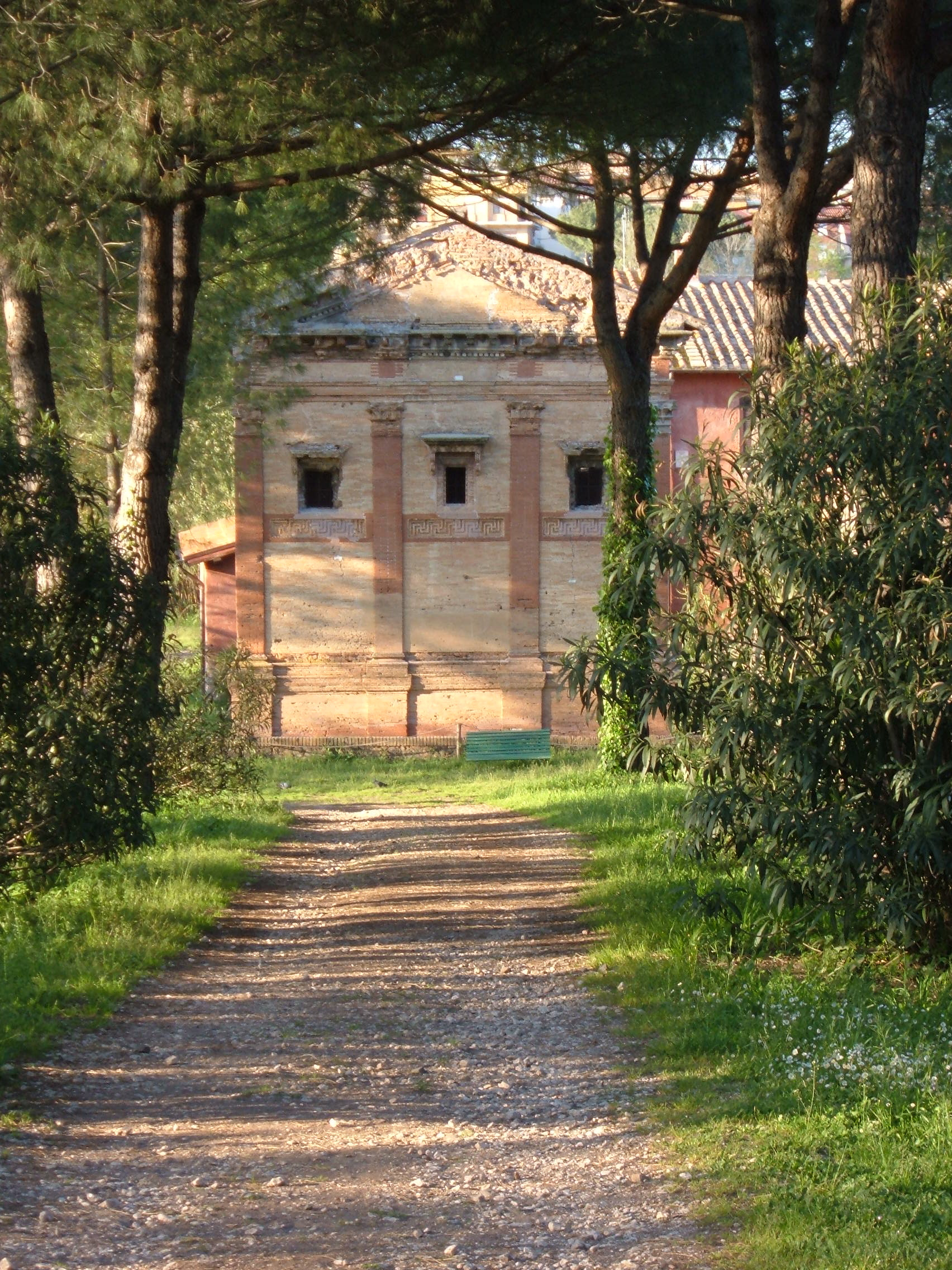
Road leading to the tomb in the Caffarella Park

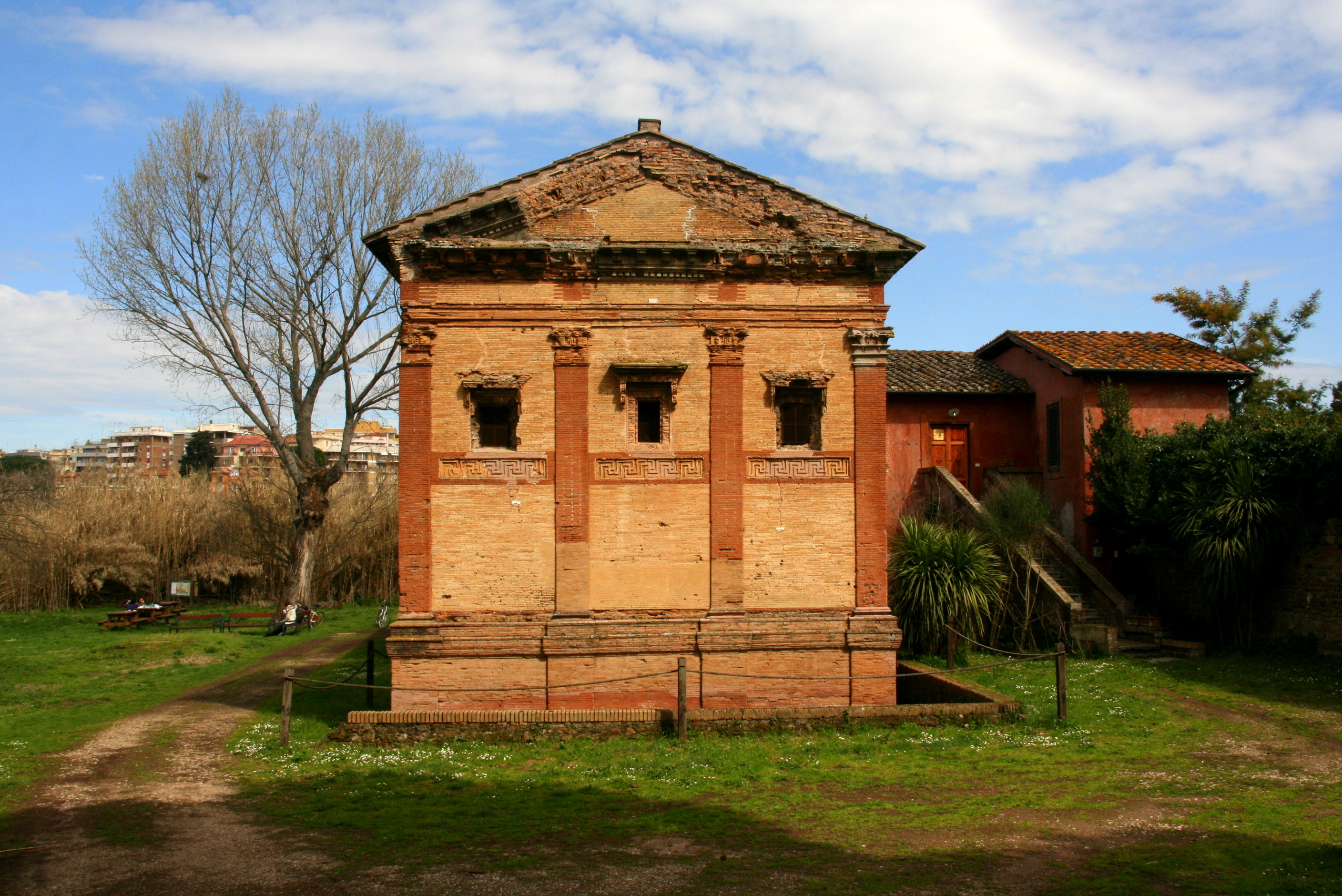
Another view of the tomb

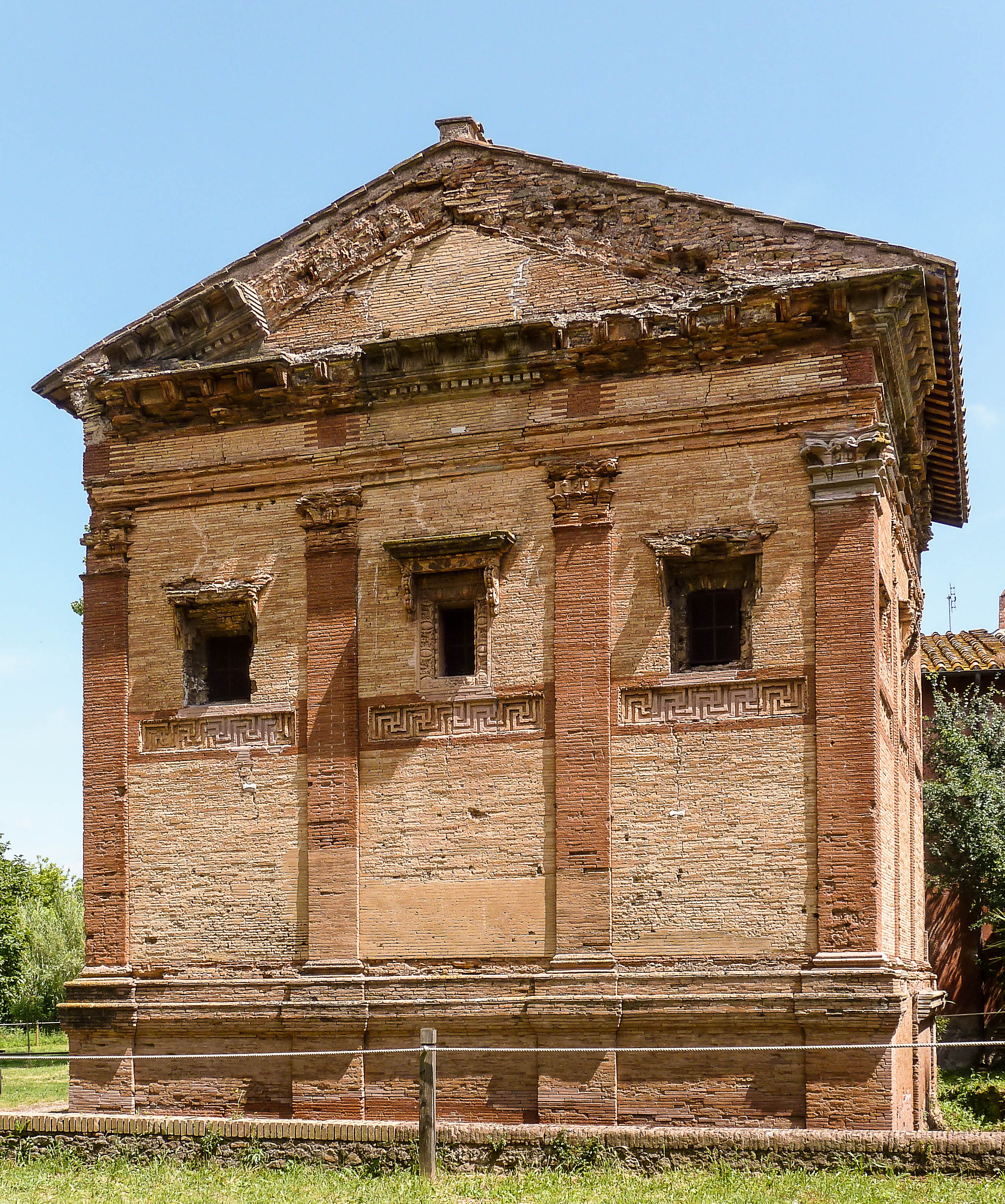
Close-up view of the front of the tomb

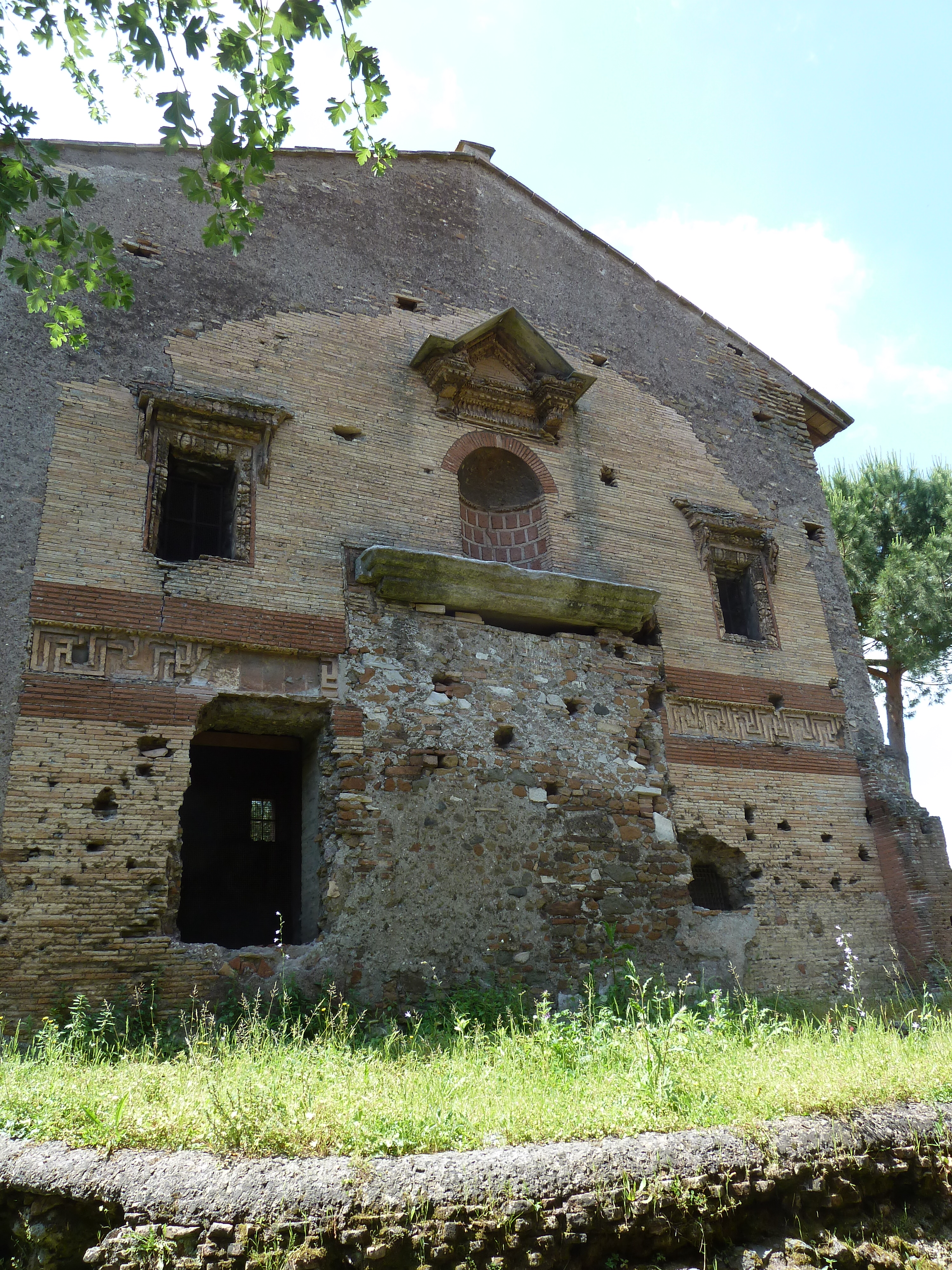
View of the rear of the tomb

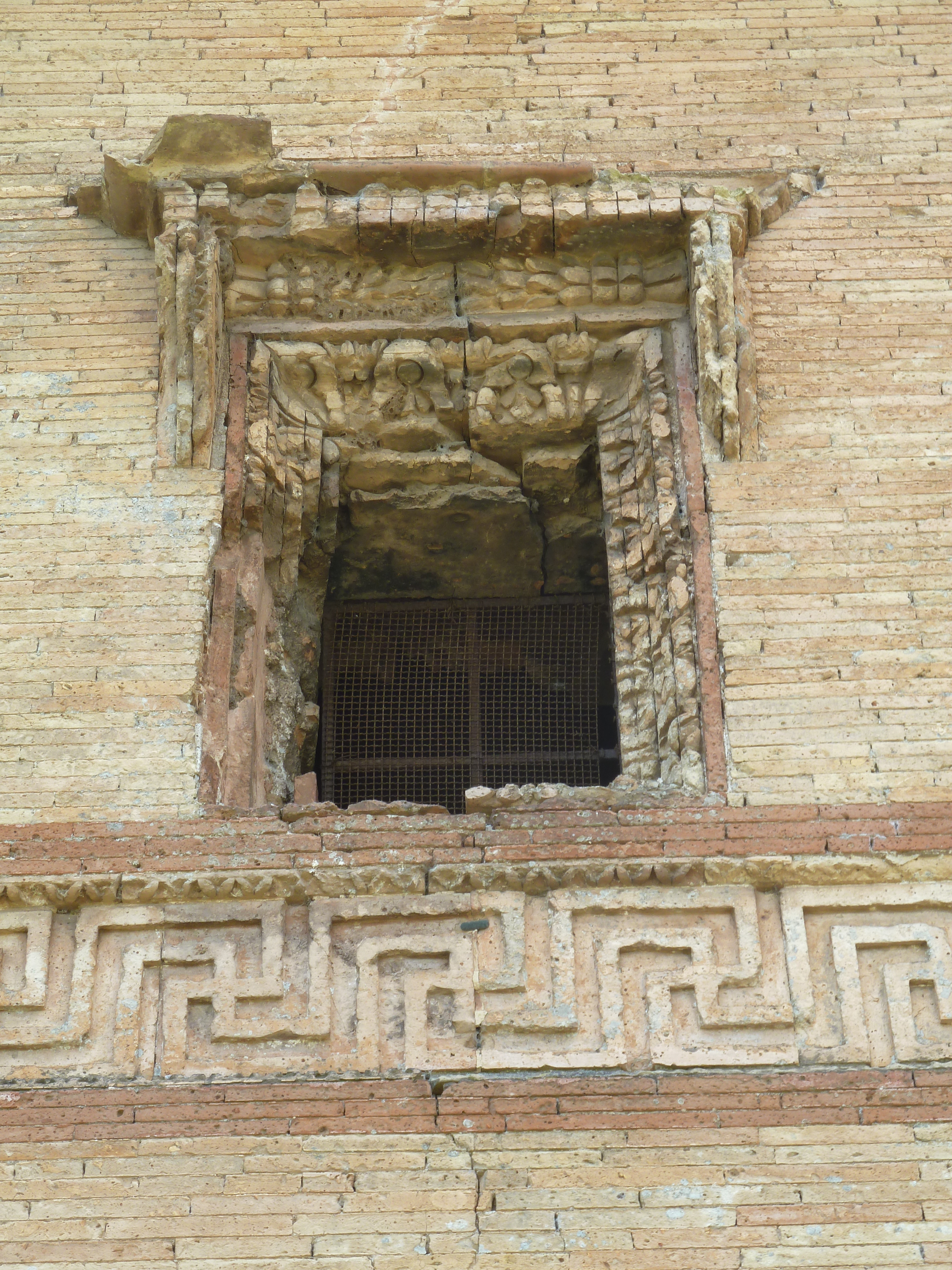
Architectural detail of the tomb

== Sources ==
- Barbara F. McManus. "Index of Images, Part XIII". The VRoma Project.
- Rodolfo Lanciani (1892). "VI. Pagan Cemeteries". Pagan and Christian Rome. Boston and New York: Houghton, Mifflin and Company. Accessible on William P. Thayer's site Lacus Curtius.
- Σ. Θ. Φωτείνου, Ολυμπία - Οδηγός Αρχαιοτήτων, Συγκρότημα Γραφικών Τεχνών, Άνω Καλαμάκι Αθήνα, 1972
- A. R. Birley, The Roman Government of Britain, Oxford University Press, 2005
- Sarah B. Pomeroy, The murder of Regilla: a case of domestic violence in antiquity, Harvard University Press, 2007
