= Athenais of Media Atropatene =

Queen of Commagene

Athenais of Media Atropatene was a noblewoman of Iranian origin who became queen of the Kingdom of Commagene in the late 1st century BC as the wife of Mithridates III of Commagene.

She was born into the ruling dynasty of Atropatene, a kingdom located in what is now north-western Iran and parts of Azerbaijan. She was the daughter of Darius I of Media Atropatene and her paternal grandfather was Artavasdes I of Media Atropatene.

She had one son, Antiochus who would succeed Mithridates as king.
