= Appius Annius Trebonius Gallus (consul 108) =

Late 1st/easrly 2nd century Roman senator and consul

Appius Annius Trebonius Gallus was a Roman senator, who was active during the reign of Trajan. He was ordinary consul in 108, as the colleague of Marcus Atilius Bradua.

Trebonius Gallus was born into the plebeian gens Annia. His father may have been Appius Annius Gallus, one of the suffect consuls of the year 67; according to Olli Salomies, there is a consensus that his mother was probably Trebonia, a daughter of Publius Trebonius, consul suffectus in 53. Gallus was related to the senator Marcus Annius Verus; Verus was a brother-in-law of Hadrian, and the father of Faustina the Elder, wife of Antoninus Pius and aunt of Marcus Aurelius.

Gallus had a son named Appius Annius Trebonius Gallus, who was consul in 139.

== Sources ==
- Sarah B. Pomeroy, The murder of Regilla: a case of domestic violence in antiquity, Harvard University Press, 2007

Political offices
Preceded by Gaius Julius Longinus, and Gaius Valerius Paullinus as Suffect consuls	Consul of the Roman Empire; 108 with Marcus Atilius Bradua	Succeeded by Publius Aelius Hadrianus, and Marcus Trebatius Priscus as Suffect consuls
