= Marcus Atilius Bradua =

Late 1st/early 2nd century Roman tribune, consul and governor

Marcus Atilius Bradua, also known by his full name Marcus Atilius Metilius Bradua was a Roman politician who lived in the second half of the 1st century and the first half of the 2nd century in the Roman Empire.

== Biography ==
Bradua was a member of the gens Atilia. He was born and raised in a Roman family of consular rank, possibly of Patrician rank. Bradua originated in Cisalpina (northern Italy). His father, Marcus Atilius Postumus Bradua, served as a proconsul of the Asia Province under the Emperor Domitian (81–96). His second nomen, Metilius, suggests that his mother may have been a Metilia. If so, his uncle could be the governor Publius Metilius Nepos.

Probably due to his patrician rank, Bradua went from the quaestorship to praetorship. There is a possibility at some point he could have served as a military tribune. In 108, Bradua served as an ordinary consul with Appius Annius Trebonius Gallus. After his time as consul, he was admitted to the College of Pontiffs.

From probably at least 111 until 118, Bradua served as the governor of Britain. At an unknown date he served as governor of either Germania Inferior or Germania Superior. Either in the year 122 or 123, Bradua became Proconsul of the Africa Province. Sometime after his African Proconsulship, he may have accompanied Hadrian on one of his numerous journeys around the Empire. Bradua outlived Hadrian's reign and died at an unknown date during the reign of the Emperor Antoninus Pius (138–161).

== Marriage and issue ==
Bradua married Caucidia Tertulla, an aristocrat who may have had Etruscan lineage. Tertulla bore Bradua two children:

- Son, Marcus Atilius Metilius Bradua Caucidius Tertullus...Bassus. He served as Proconsul of the Africa Province under Antoninus Pius.
- Daughter, Atilia Caucidia Tertulla, who married the younger Appius Annius Trebonius Gallus. His father, the elder Appius Annius Trebonius Gallus, was Bradua's consular colleague in 108. Atilia Caucidia Tertulla bore the younger Appius Annius Trebonius Gallus two children.

One of the proconsular governors of Africa, Publius Vigellius Raius Plarius Saturninus Atilius Braduanus Caucidius Tertullus, may have been a descendant of Bradua's marriage to Caucidia Tertulla.

== Posthumous Honors ==
At Olympia, Greece, there is a stone inscription dedicated to him by his granddaughter Aspasia Annia Regilla.

The city of the Eleans (honors) Marcus Appius Bradua (Greek: Μαρκόν Άππιον Βραδούαν), quaestor, praetor, [?proconsul of … and of Africa?, comes?] of the god Hadrian, consular (governor) of Germany and Britain, pontifex, sodalis Hadrianalis, maternal grandfather of Regilla, wife of Herodes.

On a stone, dated perhaps after 126, there is an honorific inscription stating, “[…] Bradua […] Propraetor”, that is found in Gwynedd. This may refer to the period that Bradua was governor of Britain.

Aspasia Annia Regilla and her husband Herodes Atticus had built at Olympia an outdoor monument called an exedra, which featured statues honoring their various relatives and members of the ruling imperial family. Among the statues that Regilla added was one of Bradua, of which only the head and his portrait bust survived, and is on display at the Archaeological Museum of Olympia.

== Sources ==
- Marcus Appius (or Attius, or Atilius) Bradua
- Plancia Magna, Aurelia Paulina, and Regilla: Civic Donors
- A. R. Birley, The Roman government of Britain, Oxford University Press, 2005
- S. B. Pomeroy, The murder of Regilla: a case of domestic violence in antiquity, Harvard University Press, 2007

Political offices
Preceded by Gaius Julius Longinus, and Gaius Valerius Paullinus as Suffect consuls	Consul of the Roman Empire; 108 with Appius Annius Trebonius Gallus	Succeeded by Publius Aelius Hadrianus, and Marcus Trebatius Priscus as Suffect consuls
Preceded by Unknown, previously Lucius Neratius Marcellus	Roman governors of Britain c. 115 - 118	Succeeded by Quintus Pompeius Falco
