= Appius Annius Trebonius Gallus (consul suffectus) =

2nd century Roman senator and consul

Appius Annius Trebonius Gallus, sometimes known as Appius Annius Gallus (Greek: Ἄππιος Ἄννιος Γάλλος, flourished 2nd century) was a Roman senator and consul.

Gallus was born into the gens Annia and was a member of the venerable family of the Annii Regilli. He was the son of Appius Annius Trebonius Gallus, consul in 108, and an unnamed noblewoman. His paternal grandfather may have been Appius Annius Gallus, one of the suffect consuls in the year 67.

Through his father, Gallus was related to the senator Marcus Annius Verus, a brother-in-law of Emperor Hadrian and father of the Empress Faustina the Elder, wife of Antoninus Pius. Faustina the Elder was the mother of Empress Faustina the Younger and aunt of Emperor Marcus Aurelius. In 139 or 140, Annius Gallus served as a consul suffectus. Although he was a distinguished senator, not much is known on his life.

Gallus married Atilia Caucidia Tertulla, the daughter of the Senator Marcus Atilius Bradua and Caucidia Tertulla. Tertulla bore him two children:

- Appius Annius Atilius Bradua, consul in 160
- Appia Annia Regilla Atilia Caucidia Tertulla, otherwise known as Aspasia Annia Regilla, who married the prominent Greek consul Herodes Atticus.

Aspasia Annia Regilla and her husband had built an outdoor monument called an exedra at Olympia, Greece, featuring statues honoring their various relatives and members of the ruling imperial family. Among the statues was one of a toga-wearing Annius Gallus, which survives without its head, and is on display at the Archaeological Museum of Olympia.

== Sources ==
- http://www.vroma.org/~bmcmanus/women_civicdonors.html
- http://www.vroma.org/images/mcmanus_images/index13.html
- Σ. Θ. Φωτείνου, Ολυμπία - Οδηγός Αρχαιοτήτων, Συγκρότημα Γραφικών Τεχνών, Άνω Καλαμάκι Αθήνα, 1972
- G. Alföldy, Konsulat und Senatorenstand unter den Antoninen: Prosopographische Untersuchungen zur senatorischen Führungsschicht, Verlag Dr. Rudolf Habelt, 1977
- A. R. Birley, The Roman Government of Britain, Oxford University Press, 2005
- S. B. Pomeroy, The murder of Regilla: a case of domestic violence in antiquity, Harvard University Press, 2007
