= Appius Annius Gallus =

1st century AD Roman senator and general

Appius Annius Gallus was a Roman senator and general who flourished during the first century. He held the office of suffect consul in 67 with Lucius Verulanus Severus as his colleague. The suffect consul of 67 is commonly identified as the general who supported Otho during the Year of the Four Emperors.

== Life ==
=== Military career under Otho ===
Except for his tenure as suffect consul, Gallus's life before the year 69 is largely unknown. In that year, the ephemeral emperor Otho selected him to be one of his generals. Gallus, along with Gaius Suetonius Paulinus and Aulus Marius Celsus, led the assembled troops north from Rome to confront the legions supporting Vitellius near the Po river. Tacitus notes that Gallus took command of the lead elements along with Titus Vestricius Spurinna. Once they reached the Po, Otho sent Spurinna on to occupy Placentia while he marched to Verona. Upon hearing that Spurinna's men were encircled by soldiers loyal to Vitellius, Gallus moved to assist his associate, but stopped at Bedriacum when word reached him that the enemy was driven off after an unsuccessful assault.

Gallus was not present at the Battle of Bedriacum that followed, because he had been injured by a fall from his horse. Along with Suetonius Paulinus and Marius Celsus, he opposed engaging Vitellius' men immediately, concurring with their advice that Otho would do better to wait until the legions from the Balkans arrived. Nevertheless, Emperor Otho ignored their advice and his men were defeated at Bedriacum. When Vedius Aquila, the commander of one of legions supporting Otho, returned to camp and found himself the potential victim of a murderous group of defeated soldiers, Annius Gallus intervened and saved his life.

=== Under Vespasian ===
Despite having supported one of the unsuccessful rivals for the imperial insignia, Gallus managed to avoid becoming a victim of the ensuing proscriptions. He is next found as a general under Vespasian, assigned to assist in suppressing the Sequani, who had risen in revolt along with the Batavians. Werner Eck sees this as evidence that Gallus had been appointed governor of Germania Superior near the end of the year 69 which he held until 72 when he was replaced by Gnaeus Pinarius Cornelius Clemens.

His actions after returning to Rome from Germania Superior are not known.

Political offices
Preceded by Lucius Julius Rufus, and Lucius Aurelius Priscus as consules suffecti	Suffect consul of the Roman Empire; 66 with Lucius Verulanus Severus	Succeeded by Tiberius Catius Asconius Silius Italicus, and Publius Galerius Trachalus as consules ordinarii
