= Atilia Caucidia Tertulla =

2nd century Roman aristocratic woman

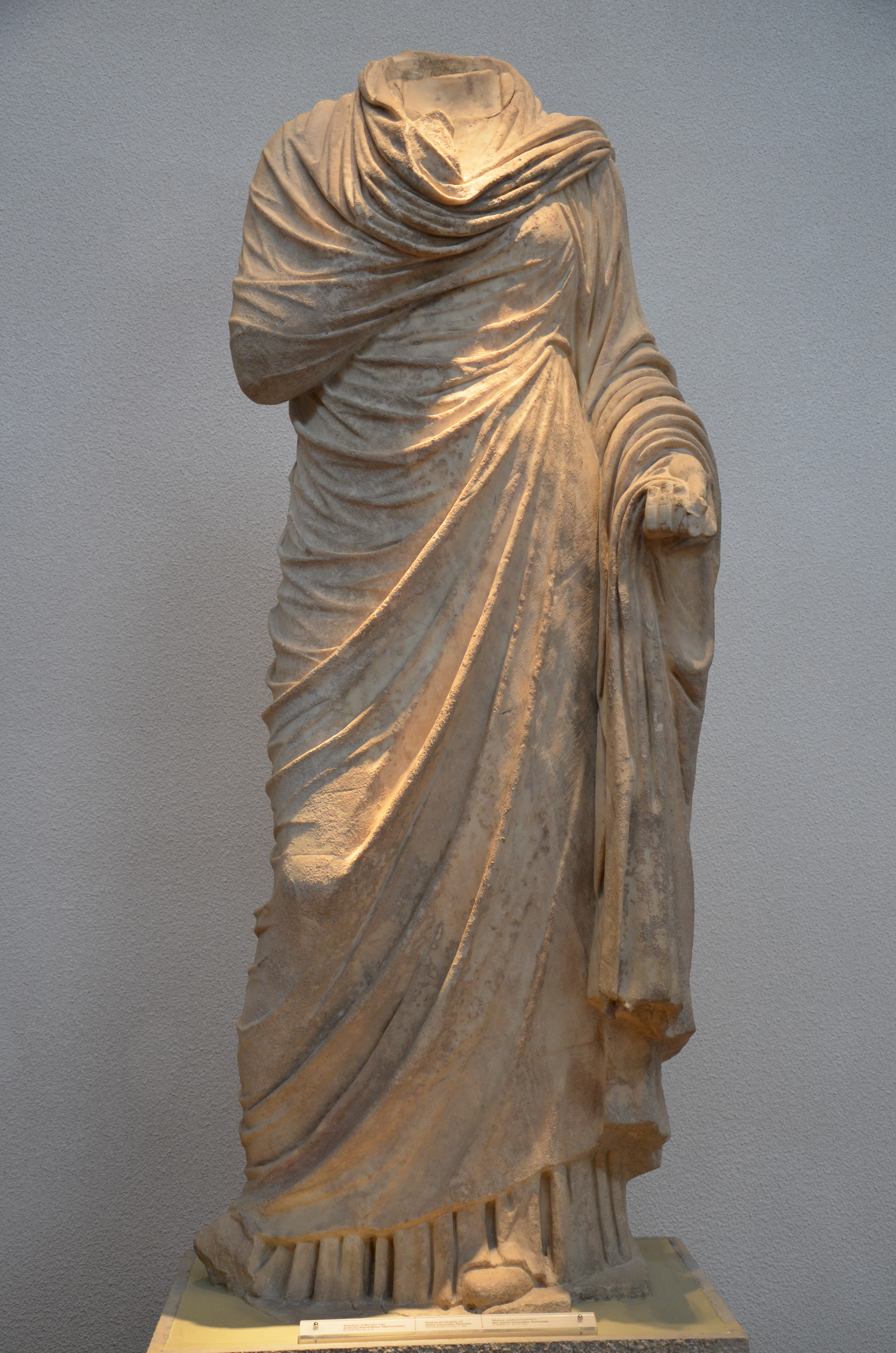

Atilia Caucidia Tertulla (flourished 2nd century) was an aristocratic woman from Ancient Roman society.

Atilia was a member of the Atilia gens and was born into a family of consular rank, probably of Patrician rank. Atilia was the daughter of the Roman Senator, Consul and Governor Marcus Atilius Bradua and Caucidia Tertulla. Her brother was Marcus Atilius Metilius Bradua Caucidius Tertullus... Bassus. He served as a polyonymous Proconsul of the Africa Province under Roman Emperor Antoninus Pius (138-161).

Atilia was an aristocratic, wealthy woman, little is known about her life. She married the distinguished Roman Senator Appius Annius Trebonius Gallus. The father of Atilia and the father of Annius Gallus were consular colleagues in 108.

Atilia bore Annius Gallus two children who were:

- Son and future consul, Appius Annius Atilius Bradua
- Daughter, Appia Annia Regilla Atilia Caucidia Tertulla, otherwise known as Aspasia Annia Regilla who married the prominent Greek Herodes Atticus

== Sources ==
- http://www.vroma.org/~bmcmanus/women_civicdonors.html
- http://www.vroma.org/images/mcmanus_images/index13.html
- Σ. Θ. Φωτείνου, Ολυμπίά - Οδηγός Αρχαίοτητών, Συγροτήματος Γραφικών Τεχνών, Ανω Καλαμάκι Αθήνα, 1972
- A. R. Birley, The Roman Government of Britain, Oxford University Press, 2005
- S. B. Pomeroy, The murder of Regilla: a case of domestic violence in antiquity, Harvard University Press, 2007
