= Faustina the Elder =

Roman empress from 138 to 140

- Augusta
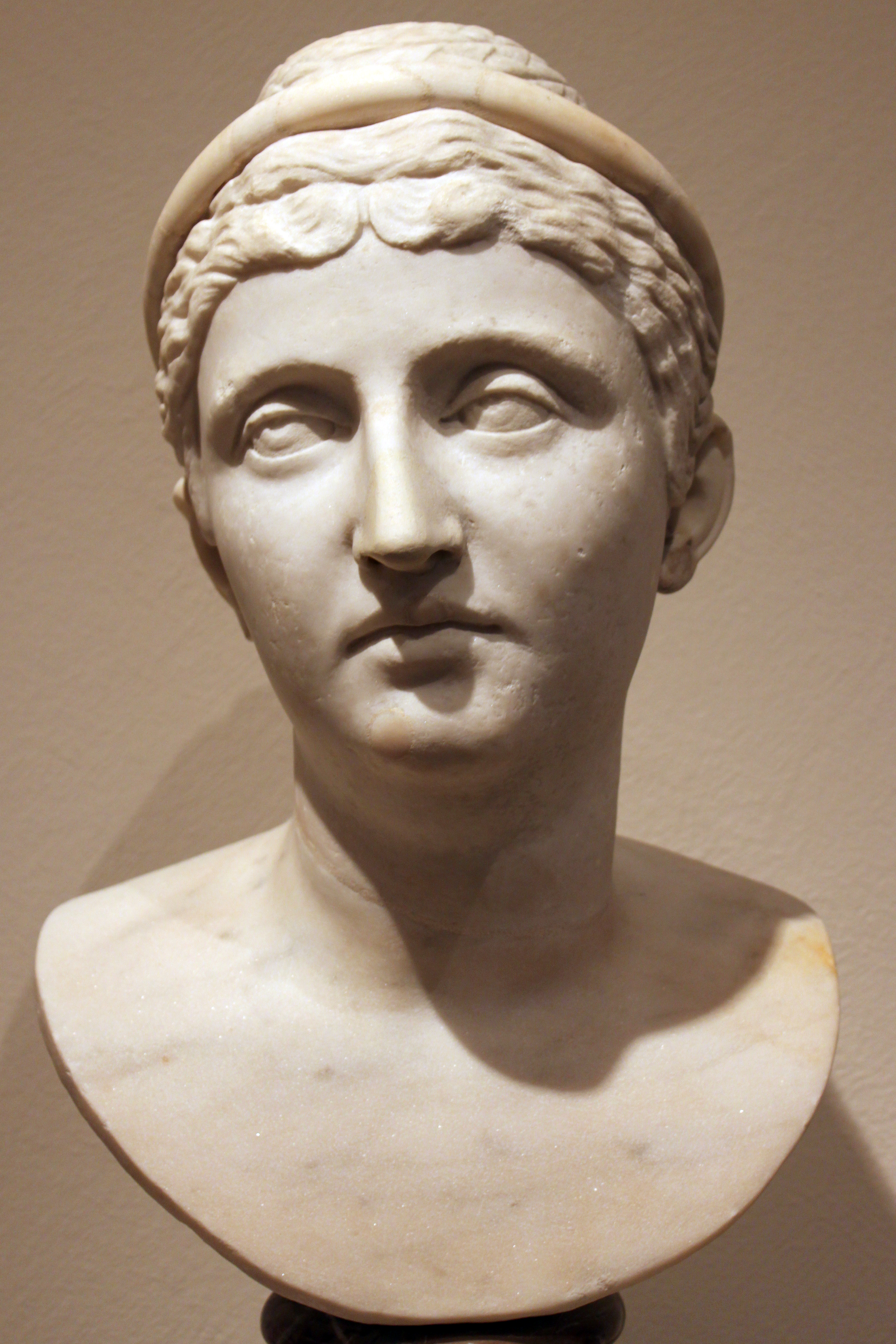
- Bust of Faustina Major in the Altes Museum (Berlin)

Roman empress
- Tenure: 138 – 140
- Born: c. 100
- Died: late October 140 (aged 40) near Rome, Italy
- Burial: Mausoleum of Hadrian
- Spouse: Antoninus Pius
- Issue: Marcus Aurelius Fulvius Antoninus (died before 138); Marcus Galerius Aurelius Antoninus (died before 138); Aurelia Fadilla (died in 135); Annia Galeria Faustina Minor or Faustina the Younger
Names
- Annia Galeria Faustina
Regnal name
- Annia Galeria Faustina Augusta
- Dynasty: Nerva–Antonine
- Father: Marcus Annius Verus
- Mother: Rupilia Faustina

Annia Galeria Faustina the Elder, sometimes referred to as Faustina I or Faustina Major (c. 100 (Note: Levick (2014), p. 169, estimates her birth year as c. 97 CE, while noting the estimate of c. 105 in Kienast (1990). Römische Kaisertabelle. A latter edition of Kienast's book, however, simply states that her birthdate is unknown and then proceeds to mentions Levick's estimate.) (Note: The Feriale Duranum records the birthday of Diva Faustina as 20–22 September (between 10 and 12 days before the kalends of October). However, it's not possible to determine if this is Faustina I or Faustina II. A Roman inscription records the birthday of Faustinae uxoris Antonini as 16 February (14 days before the kalends of March). The text could refer to either Faustina I, who married Antoninus Pius, or Faustina II, who married Marcus Aurelius Antoninus.) – late October 140), was a Roman empress and wife of the Roman emperor Antoninus Pius. The emperor Marcus Aurelius was her nephew and later became her adopted son, along with Emperor Lucius Verus. She died early in the principate of Antoninus Pius, but continued to be prominently commemorated as a diva, posthumously playing a prominent symbolic role during his reign.

== Early life ==
Faustina was the only known daughter of consul and prefect Marcus Annius Verus and Rupilia Faustina. Her brothers were consul Marcus Annius Libo and praetor Marcus Annius Verus. Her maternal aunts were Roman Empress Vibia Sabina and Matidia Minor. Her paternal grandfather was named Marcus Annius Verus, like her father, while her maternal grandparents were suffect consul Lucius Scribonius Libo Rupilius Frugi Bonus and possibly Vitellia. Faustina was born and raised in Rome.

While a private citizen, she married Antoninus Pius between 110 and 115. Faustina bore four children with Pius: two sons and two daughters. These were:

- Marcus Aurelius Fulvius Antoninus (died before 138); his sepulchral inscription has been found at the Mausoleum of Hadrian in Rome.
- Marcus Galerius Aurelius Antoninus (died before 138); his sepulchral inscription has been found at the Mausoleum of Hadrian in Rome. He is commemorated by a high-quality series of bronze coins, possibly struck at Rome, though their language is Greek.
- Aurelia Fadilla (died in 135); she married Aelius Lamia Silvanus or Syllanus. She appears to have had no children with her husband and her sepulchral inscription has been found in Italy.
- Annia Galeria Faustina Minor or Faustina the Younger (between 125–130 to 175), a future Roman Empress; she married her maternal cousin, future Roman Emperor Marcus Aurelius. She was the only child who survived to see Antoninus and Faustina elevated to the imperial rank.

According to the unreliable Historia Augusta, there were rumours while Antoninus was proconsul of Asia that Faustina conducted herself with "excessive frankness and levity".

== Empress ==
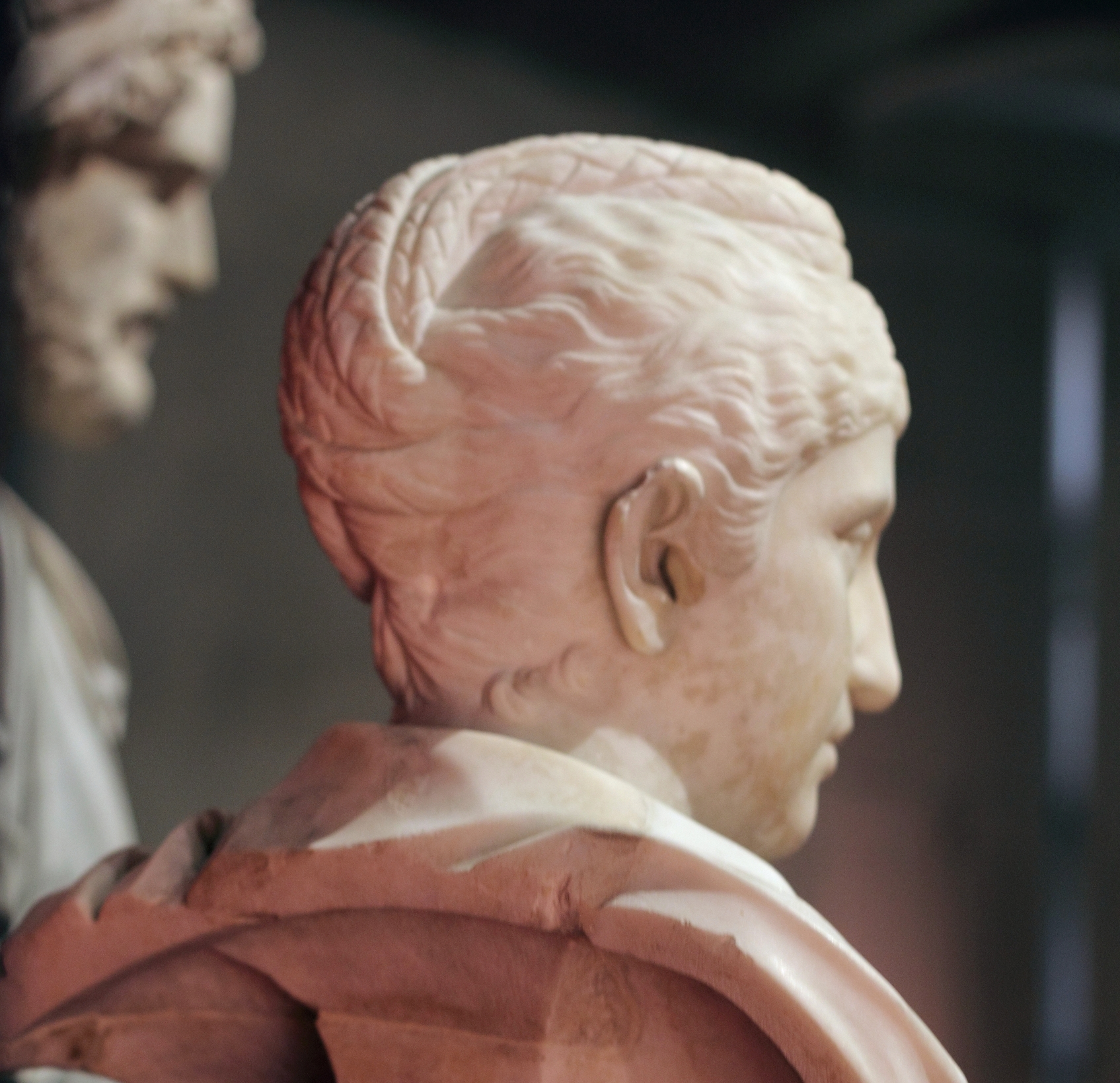
Side view of a bust of Faustina in the Musei Capitolini; note the distinctive hairstyle

On July 10, 138, her uncle, the emperor Hadrian, died and her husband became the new emperor, as Antoninus was Hadrian's adopted son and heir. Faustina became Roman Empress and the Senate accorded her the title of Augusta. As empress, Faustina was well respected and was renowned for her beauty and wisdom. Throughout her life, as a private citizen and as empress, Faustina was involved in assisting charities for the poor and sponsoring and assisting in the education of Roman children, particularly girls. A letter between Fronto and Antoninus Pius has sometimes been taken as an index of the latter's devotion to her.

After Antoninus Pius' accession to the principate, the couple never left Italy; instead, they divided their time between Rome, Antoninus' favourite estate at Lorium, and other properties at Lanuvium, Tusculum, and Signia.

Faustina's personal style was evidently much admired and emulated. Her distinctive hairstyle, consisting of braids pulled back in a bun behind or on top of her head, was imitated for two or three generations in the Roman world.

Several provincial groups chose to honour her while she was empress: a company of couriers in Ephesus named themselves after her, while a company of clapper-players in Puteoli dedicated an altar to her in her lifetime.

== Death and legacy ==
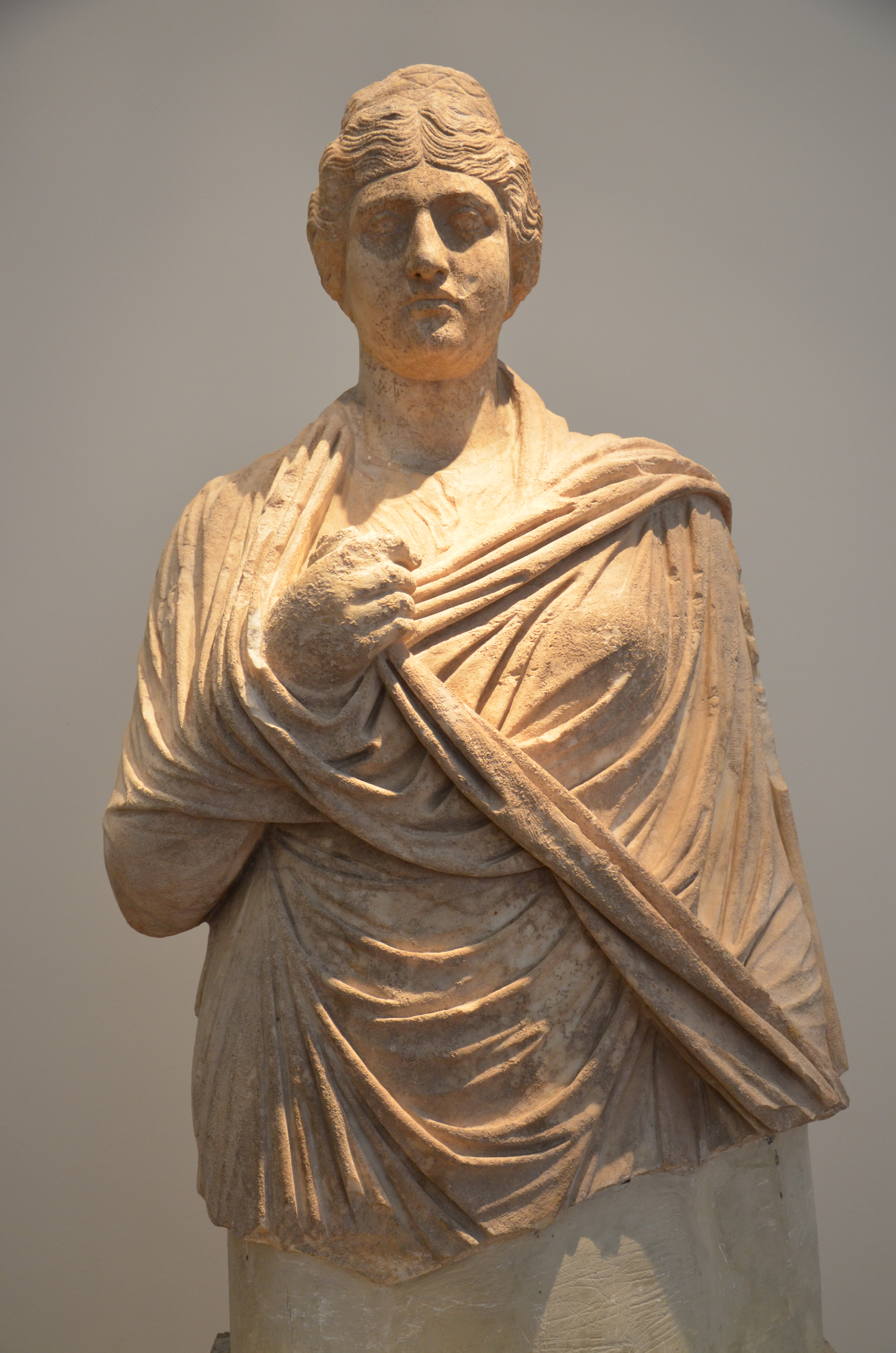
Statue of Faustina the Elder at Herodes Atticus' nymphaeum at Olympia.

Faustina died near Rome in 140, perhaps at Antoninus Pius's estate at Lorium. Antoninus was devastated at Faustina's death and took several steps to honor her memory. He had the Senate deify her (her apotheosis was portrayed on an honorary column) and dedicate the Temple of Faustina to her in the Roman Forum. Because of this, Faustina was the first Roman empress with a permanent presence in the Forum Romanum. The Senate authorized gold and silver statues of her, including an image to appear in the circus, where it might be displayed in a carpentum (a kind of covered wagon) or currus elephantorum (a cart drawn by elephants). Antoninus also ordered various coins with her portrait struck, inscribed DIVA FAVSTINA ("Divine Faustina") and elaborately decorated. He also established a charity called Puellae Faustinianae ("Girls of Faustina") to assist orphaned Roman girls and created a new alimenta (see Grain supply to the city of Rome). Her remains were interred in the Mausoleum of Hadrian. Certain cities struck coin issues in honour of the "divine Faustina" (Ancient Greek: ΘΕΑ ΦΑΥϹΤΕΙΝΑ); the most notable such cities were Delphi, Alexandria, Bostra, and Nicopolis. Martin Beckmann suggests that the coins of Nicopolis might have been minted at Rome and given out as imperial largesse at the Actian Games. The coins issued in the wake of Faustina's funeral illustrate her elaborate funeral pyre, which may have influenced the design of later private mausolea; the deities Pietas and Aeternitas, among others; and an eagle (or less often a winged genius) bearing a figure aloft, with the legend CONSECRATIO (i.e. Faustina's ascension into heaven). Coins of Faustina were sometimes incorporated into jewellery and worn as amulets.

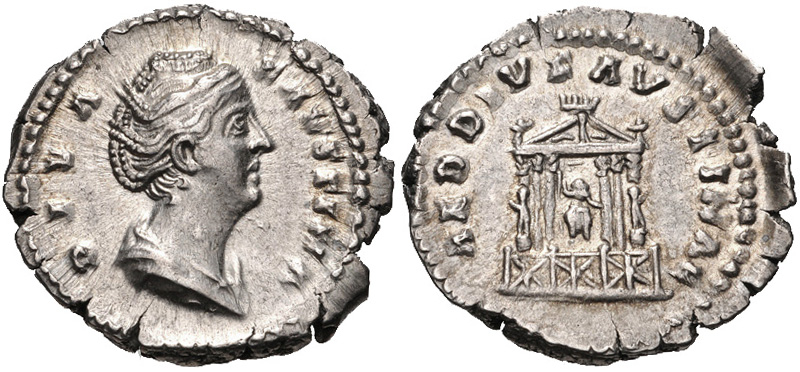
A denarius struck in honour of Faustina, depicting her temple with the abbreviated legend AED DIV FAVSTINAE (‘temple of the divine Faustina’)

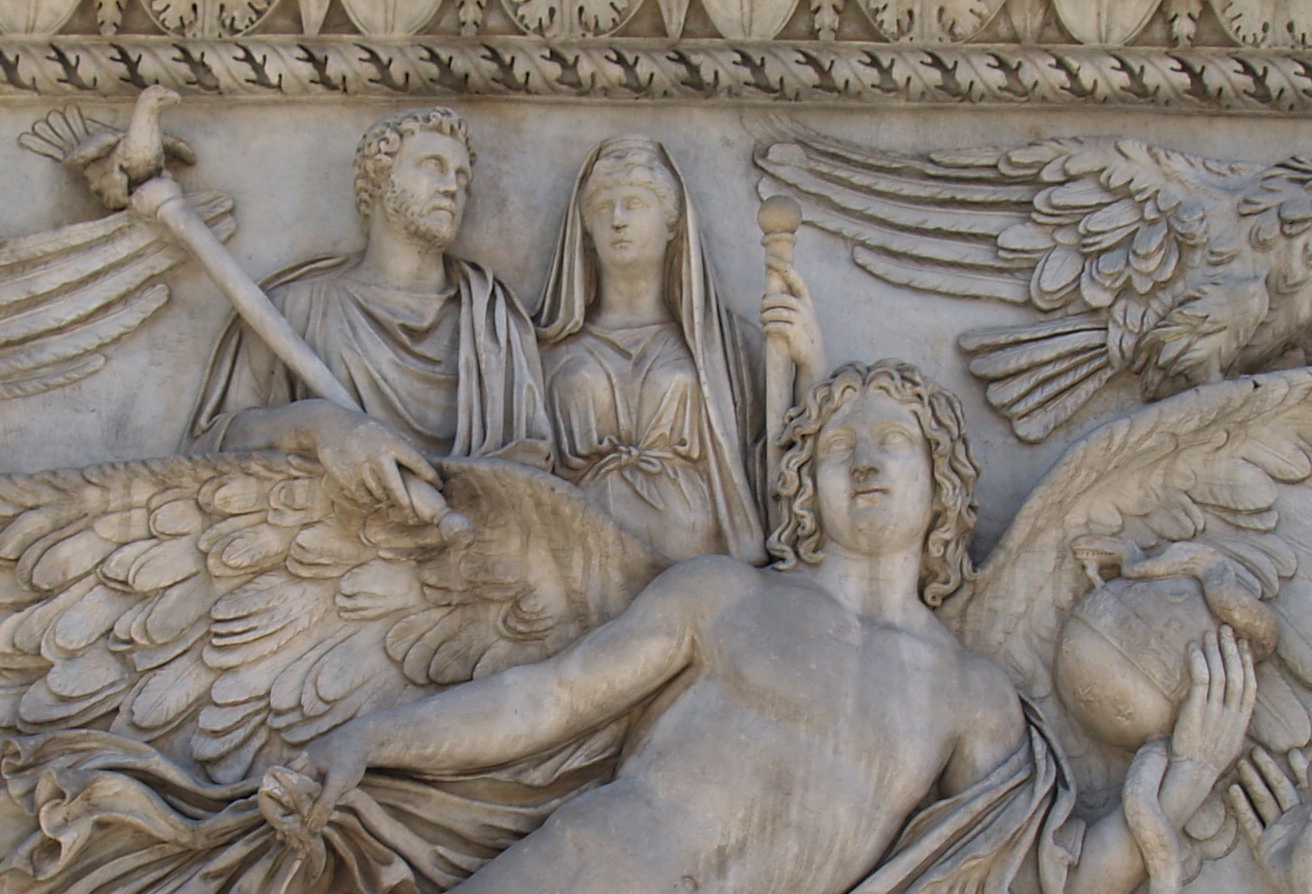
Depiction of Pius and Faustina being borne aloft on the back of a winged genius. From the base of the Column of Antoninus Pius.

The posthumous cult of Faustina was exceptionally widespread, and Faustina's image continued to be omnipresent throughout Antoninus Pius' principate. A colossal marble head, believed to be that of Faustina and discovered in 2008, figured as one of several monumental imperial statues at the ancient site of Sagalassos in today's Turkey. In Olympia, Herodes Atticus dedicated a nymphaeum that displayed statues of Faustina and other Antonines as well as his own ancestors. Faustina also appears on the Parthian Monument at Ephesus commemorating members of the imperial family. Bergmann and Watson have characterized the commemoration of Faustina as central to Antoninus Pius' political persona. One larger-than-life statue, discovered in situ near the Termini railway station at Rome, appears to depict Faustina as Concordia, with a patera and cornucopia; it would have been displayed alongside statues of Diana Lucifera and Apollo-Sol in baths privately owned but available to the public.

Antoninus and Faustina were officially held up as such exemplars of conjugal harmony that newlyweds were directed to pray at an altar of Antoninus and Faustina that they might live up to their example. This was evidently the case in Ostia, and probably so in Rome.

The Temple of Faustina is thought to have been dedicated in 144. It is a grand hexastyle structure with Corinthian columns, possibly designed originally to be a temple of Ceres. Depictions on coins appear to show a cult image of Faustina seated on a throne and holding a tall staff in her left hand. Faustina's portrait on coins from this period is often crowned as well as veiled, which may also recall a feature of Faustina's cult image from the temple.

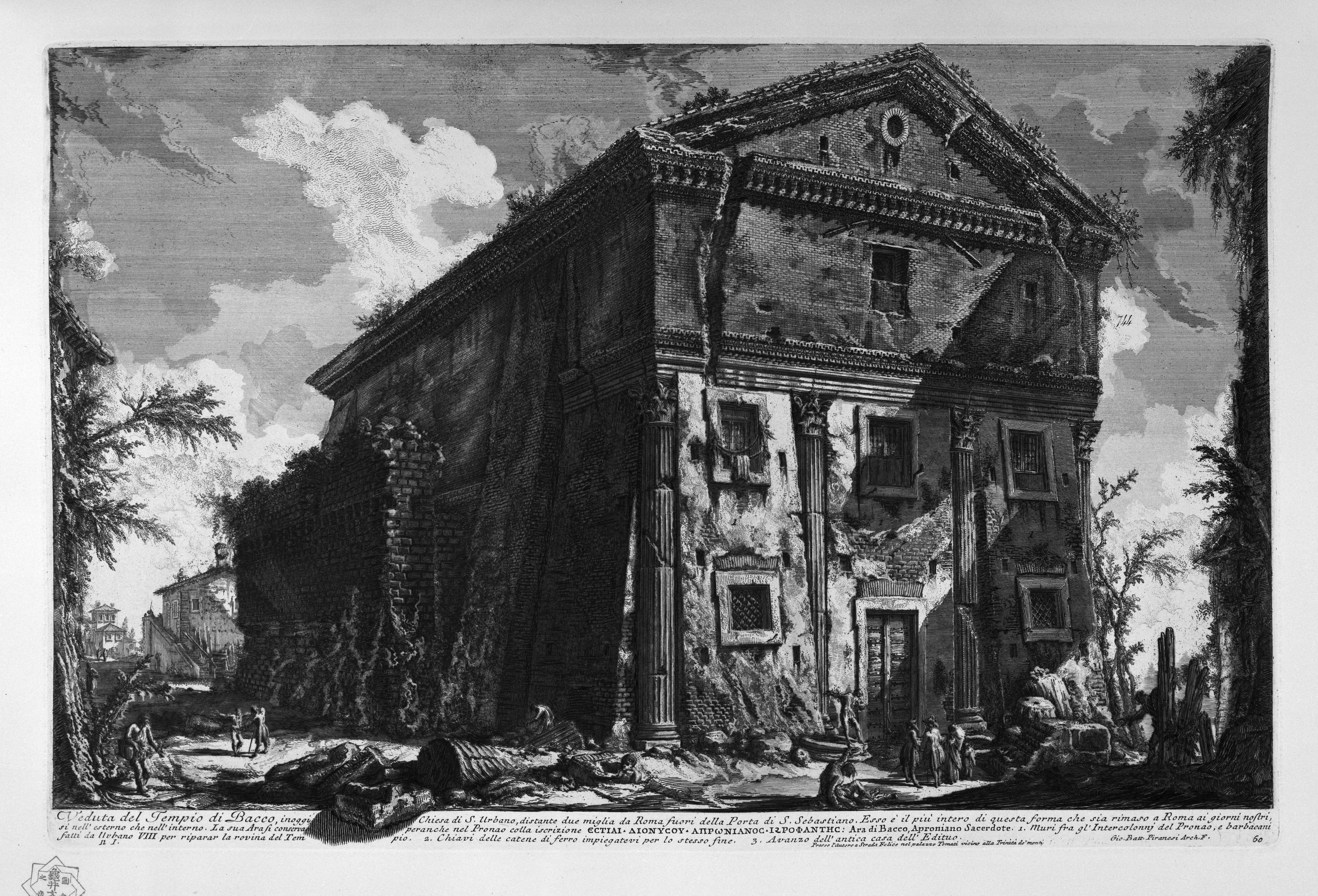
The church of Sant'Urbano alla Caffarella near Rome, originally built as a private shrine of Ceres and Faustina

The deified Faustina was associated particularly closely with Ceres, who featured prominently on coins of Faustina; for some years, the torch-bearing Ceres was the dominant motif in her gold coinage. Herodes Atticus venerated Faustina as the “new Demeter” (the Greek equivalent of Ceres) at a private sanctuary he established outside Rome, now the church of Sant'Urbano. In addition to Ceres, Vesta and Juno feature prominently in Faustina's coinage. She was also associated with the Magna Mater and at Cyrene with Isis; at Sardis she was worshipped conjointly with Artemis.

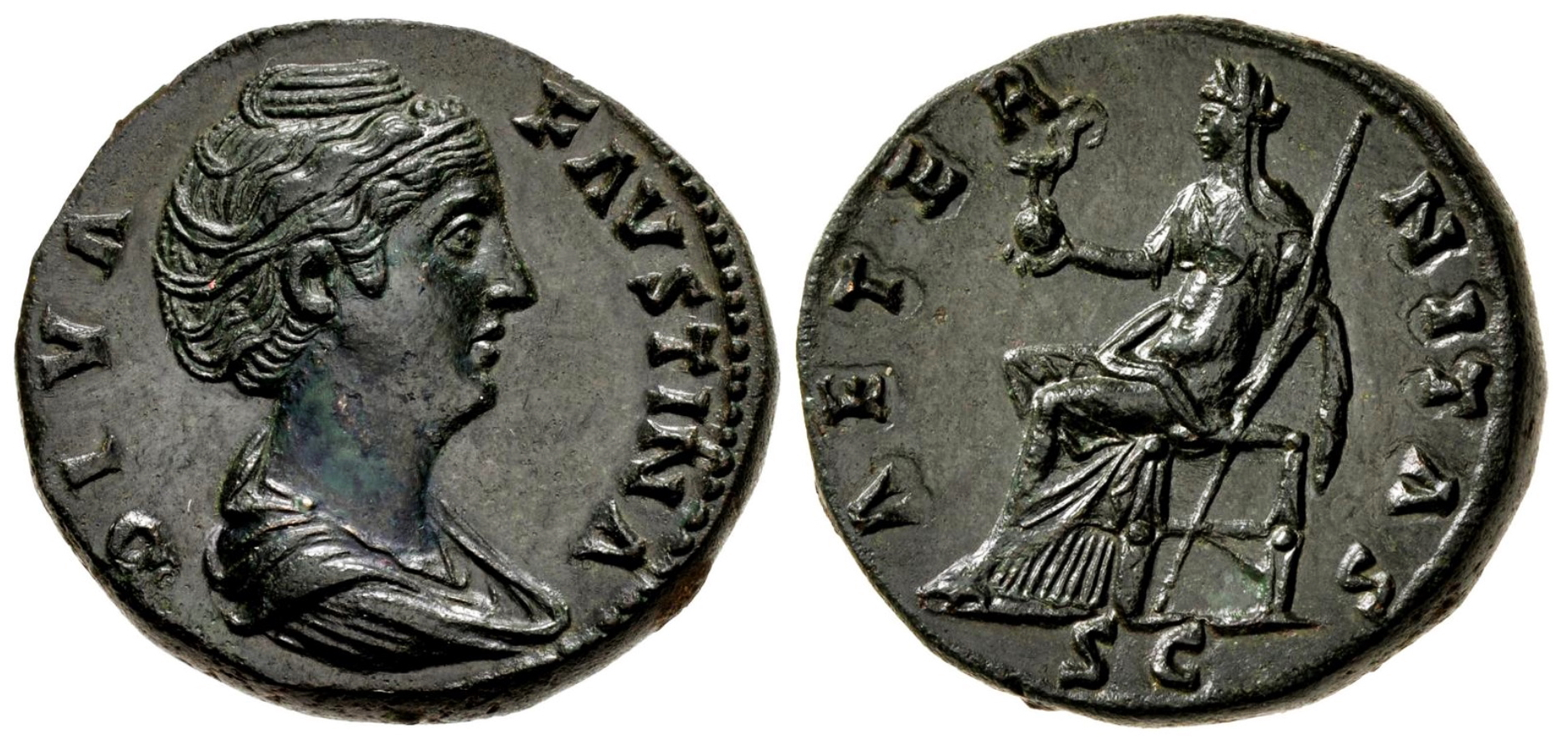
Sestertius of Faustina showing her portrait and Aeternitas

Ten years after Faustina's death, a new commemorative coinage was introduced, featuring the legend Aeternitas ('eternity'); such coins may have been introduced to be distributed at a public ceremony in her memory.

After Antoninus Pius' death, his adoptive sons and successors Marcus Aurelius and Lucius Verus erected the Column of Antoninus Pius, which dramatically depicted Antoninus and Faustina being elevated heavenward together on the back of a winged genius.

Marcus Aurelius also built a Temple of Faustina at Elefsina in Greece.

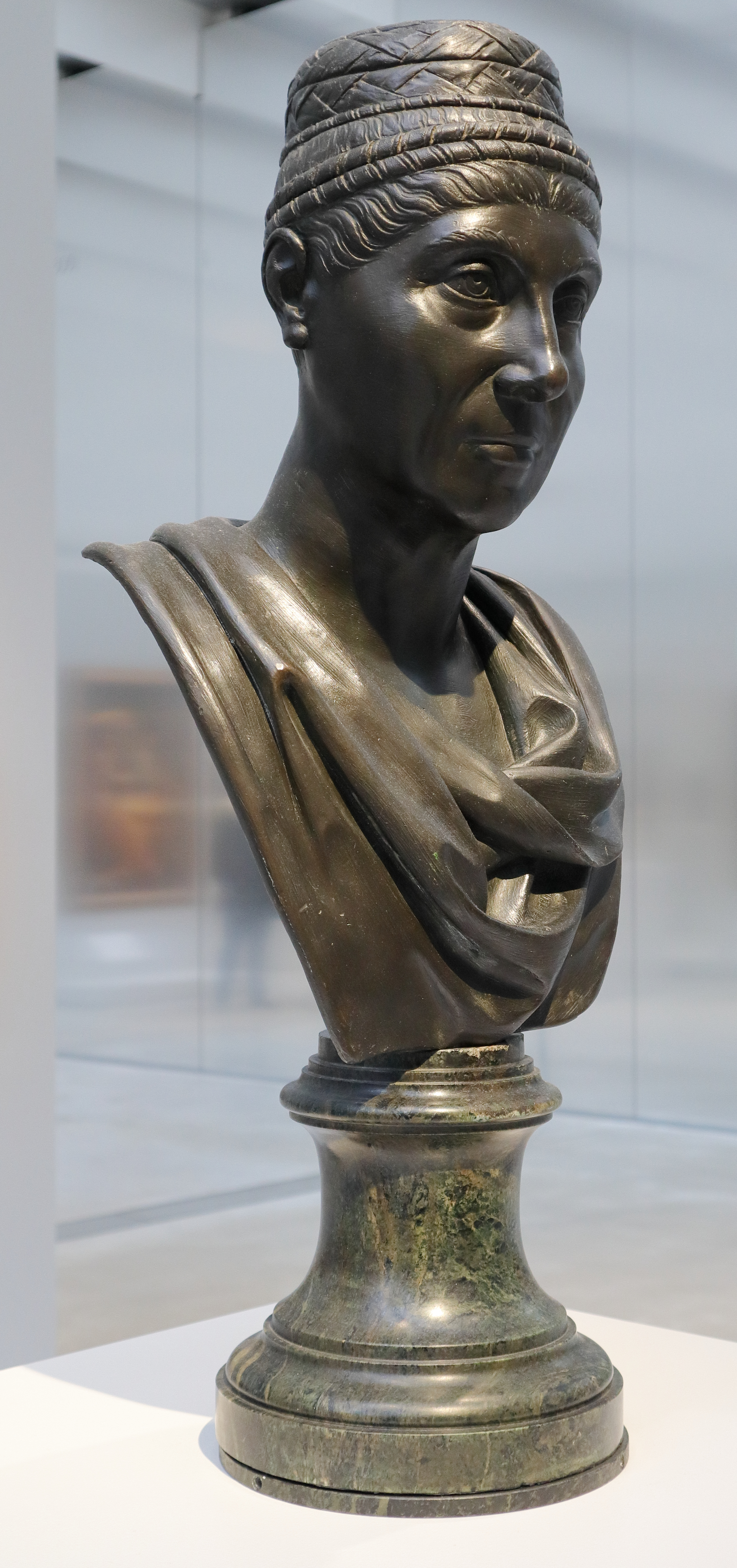
Renaissance artwork of Faustina at the Louvre-Lens

Faustina continued to be commemorated in certain Renaissance depictions as a “model wife”.

== Nerva–Antonine family tree ==
Nerva–Antonine family tree

Q. Marcius Barea Soranus	Q. Marcius Barea Sura	Antonia Furnilla	M. Cocceius Nerva	Sergia Plautilla	P. Aelius Hadrianus
Titus (r. 79–81)	Marcia Furnilla	Marcia	Trajanus Pater	Nerva (r. 96–98)	Ulpia (Note: Sister of Trajan's father: Giacosa (1977), p. 7.)	Aelius Hadrianus Marullinus
Flavia (Note: Giacosa (1977), p. 8.)	Marciana (Note: Levick (2014), p. 161.)	C. Salonius Matidius (Note: Husband of Ulpia Marciana: Levick (2014), p. 161.)	Trajan (r. 98–117)	Plotina	P. Acilius Attianus	P. Aelius Afer (Note: Giacosa (1977), p. 7.)	Paulina Major (Note: DIR contributor (Herbert W. Benario, 2000), "Hadrian".)
Lucius Mindius (2)	Libo Rupilius Frugi (3)	Salonia Matidia (Note: Giacosa (1977), p. 9.)	L. Vibius Sabinus (1) (Note: Husband of Salonia Matidia: Levick (2014), p. 161.)
Paulina Minor	L. Julius Ursus Servianus (Note: Smith (1870), "Julius Servianus".)
Matidia Minor	Sabina	Hadrian (Note: Smith (1870), "Hadrian", pp. 319–322.) (r. 117–138)	Antinous (Note: Lover of Hadrian: Lambert (1984), p. 99 and passim; deification: Lamber (1984), pp. 2–5, etc.)
C. Fuscus Salinator I	Julia Serviana Paulina
M. Annius Verus (Note: Husband of Rupilia Faustina: Levick (2014), p. 163.)	Rupilia Faustina (Note: Levick (2014), p. 163.) (Note: It is uncertain whether Rupilia Faustina was Frugi's daughter by Salonia Matidia or another woman.)	Boionia Procilla	Cn. Arrius Antoninus
L. Ceionius Commodus	Appia Severa	C. Fuscus Salinator II
L. Caesennius Paetus	Arria Antonina	Arria Fadilla (Note: Levick (2014), p. 162.)	T. Aurelius Fulvus
L. Caesennius Antoninus	L. Commodus	Plautia	unknown (Note: Levick (2014), p. 164.)	C. Avidius Nigrinus
M. Annius Verus	Calvisia Domitia Lucilla (Note: Wife of M. Annius Verus: Giacosa (1977), p. 10.)	Fundania (Note: Wife of M. Annius Libo: Levick (2014), p. 163.)	M. Annius Libo	Faustina	Antoninus Pius (r. 138–161)	L. Aelius Caesar	Avidia
Cornificia	Marcus Aurelius (r. 161–180) (Note: Giacosa (1977), p. 10.)	Faustina Minor	C. Avidius Cassius (Note: The epitomator of Cassius Dio (72.22) gives the story that Faustina the Elder promised to marry Avidius Cassius. This is also echoed in HA "Marcus Aurelius" 24.)	Aurelia Fadilla	Lucius Verus (r. 161–169) (1)	Ceionia Fabia	Plautius Quintillus (Note: Husband of Ceionia Fabia: Levick (2014), p. 164.)	Q. Servilius Pudens	Ceionia Plautia
Cornificia Minor (Note: Levick (2014), p. 117.)	M. Petronius Sura	Commodus (r. 177–192)	Fadilla	M. Annius Verus Caesar	Ti. Claudius Pompeianus (2)	Lucilla	M. Plautius Quintillus	Junius Licinius Balbus	Servilia Ceionia
Petronius Antoninus	L. Aurelius Agaclytus (2)	Aurelia Sabina	L. Antistius Burrus (1)	Plautius Quintillus	Plautia Servilla	C. Furius Sabinus Timesitheus	Maecia Faustina	Junius Licinius Balbus?
Furia Sabinia Tranquillina	Gordian III (r. 238–244)

- (1) = 1st spouse
- (2) = 2nd spouse
- (3) = 3rd spouse
- Reddish-purple indicates emperor of the Nerva–Antonine dynasty
  lighter purple indicates designated imperial heir of said dynasty who never reigned
  grey indicates unsuccessful imperial aspirants
  bluish-purple indicates emperors of other dynasties
- dashed lines indicate adoption; dotted lines indicate love affairs/unmarried relationships
- Small Caps = posthumously deified (Augusti, Augustae, or other)

Notes:

Except where otherwise noted, the notes below indicate that an individual's parentage is as shown in the above family tree.

References:
- Giacosa, Giorgio (1977). Women of the Caesars: Their Lives and Portraits on Coins. Translated by Holloway, R. Ross. Milan: Edizioni Arte e Moneta. ISBN 0-8390-0193-2.
- Lambert, Royston (1984). Beloved and God: The Story of Hadrian and Antinous. New York: Viking. ISBN 0-670-15708-2.
- Levick, Barbara (2014). Faustina I and II: Imperial Women of the Golden Age. Oxford University Press. ISBN 978-0-19-537941-9.
- Smith, William, ed. (1870). Dictionary of Greek and Roman Biography and Mythology.

== Sources ==
- Beckmann, Martin (2012). Diva Faustina: coinage and cult in Rome and the provinces. New York: American Numismatic Society.
- Bergmann, Bettina; Watson, Wendy M. (1999). The Moon and the Stars: Afterlife of a Roman Empress. South Hadley, Massachusetts: Mount Holyoke College Art Museum.
- Freisenbruch, Annelise (2010). The First Ladies of Rome: The Women Behind the Caesars. London: Jonathan Cape.
- Lendering, Jona (2015) [2007]. "Faustina I". Livius.org. Archived from the original on 2013-07-02.
- Levick, Barbara (2014). Faustina I and II: Imperial Women of the Golden Age. Oxford University Press. ISBN 978-0-19-537941-9.
- Weigel, Richard D. (1998). "Antoninus Pius". De Imperatoribus Romanis: An Online Encyclopedia of Roman Emperors.
