= Claudii of Marathon =

The Claudii of Marathon were one of the dominant families of Athens in the first and second centuries AD. They are so called because they belonged to the Athenian deme of Marathon and received Roman citizenship under the emperor Claudius in the mid-first century AD. The family is attested in the late second century BC and claimed descent from the fifth-century BC statesman Miltiades, but first came to prominence following the Sullan Sack of Athens in 86 BC. During the first two centuries AD, members of the family dominated the Athenian priesthoods of Apollo and of the Imperial cult and became very wealthy. Several members of the family were prosecuted for tyranny. The family's fortunes culminated in the figure of Herodes Atticus, a prominent sophist, benefactor, and tutor to the Emperor Marcus Aurelius. After his death, the Claudii of Marathon rapidly fade from view.

== Origins ==
The latest generations of the family claimed that they were descendants of the fifth-century BC general Miltiades, who led the Athenians to victory in the Battle of Marathon. It is not clear whether this claim had any basis in fact. The first attested members of the family are Eucles (II) and Herodes (I), sons of Eucles (I), who appear as participants in the Pythaides, Athenian pilgrimages to Delphi which took place in the late second-century BC. It is possible that they were among the Athenians who had achieved wealth as a result of the Roman-Athenian trading condominium at Delos and had used that to break into the lower rungs of the Athenian elite.

After the Sullan Sack of Athens in 86 BC, members of the Athenian elite who had been linked to the campaign against the Romans lost power, creating a power vacuum. One of the people who exploited this situation to gain a prominent position was Herodes (II), grandson of Herodes (I). He was eponymous archon in 60/59 BC and hoplite general (the chief magistrate of Athens in this period) in 38/7 BC. He also served as the tutor of Cicero minor during his studies in Athens in 45 BC. Through an embassy to Julius Caesar, he secured fifty talents of funding for the construction of the Roman Agora in central Athens in 51/0 BC, but was unable to begin construction, probably because of the various civil wars which wracked the Roman Republic in the 40s and 30s BC.

== Eucles (IV), Polycharmus, and Herodes (III) ==
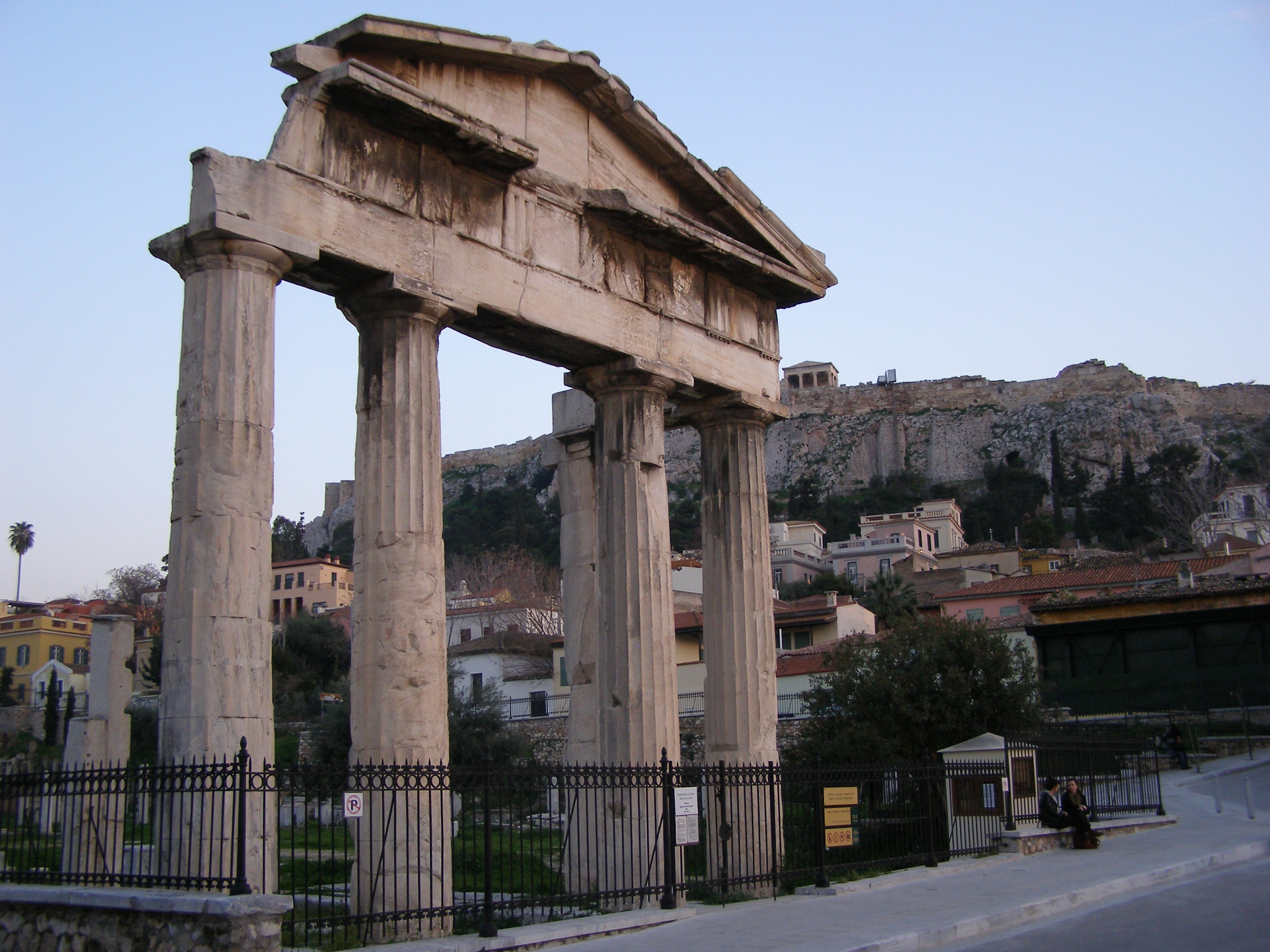
Gate of the Roman Agora, whose funding was secured by Herodes (II) and his son Eucles (IV).

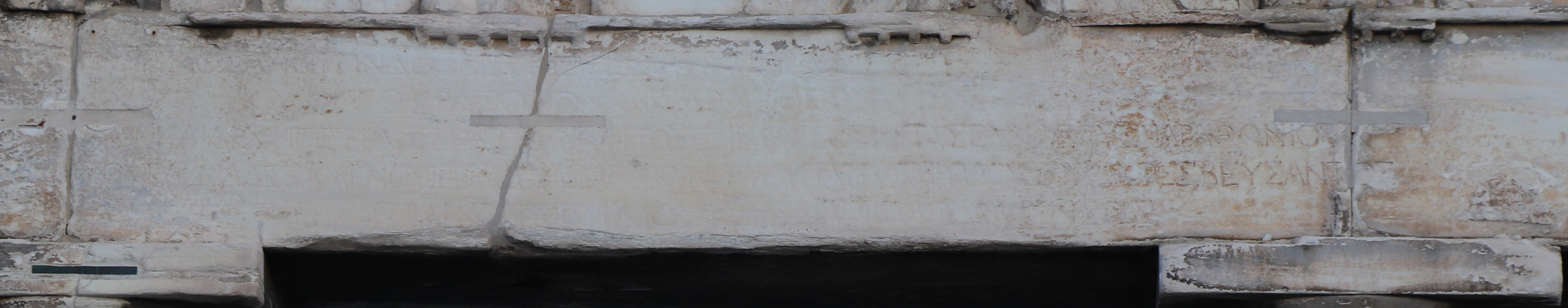
Detail of IG II^{3} 4, 12.

Herodes' son Eucles (IV) was archon of Athens in 46/5 BC or in the early 20s BC, and priest of Apollo Pythius from 38 BC. He seems to have been a supporter of Marcus Antonius against Octavian, the future emperor Augustus, in the final civil wars of the Republic (like the rest of the Athenian establishment). After Octavian's victory at the Battle of Actium in 30 BC, however, he retained his prominence and emerged as one of the three leading figures in Athens in the Augustan period, alongside Antipater of Phlya and Pammenes of Marathon.

He was Hoplite General in the 20s BC. As recorded in an inscription on the gate (IG II^{3} 4, 12), Eucles carried out an embassy to Augustus, to secure the funds promised by Julius Caesar for the Roman Agora, and then oversaw its construction, which was completed some time between 27 and 17 BC or, less likely, in 10/9 BC. He also led a series of five processions, called the dodekaides, to Delphi between 30 and 10 BC, which are recorded in inscriptions on the south wall of the Athenian Treasury at Delphi.

Eucles' eldest son, Polycharmus, was archon (ca. 10-15 AD) and herald of the Areopagus. He was priest both of Apollo Patrous and of the emperor Tiberius. Plutarch reports that he had to make a defence speech before the Athenian assembly, justifying his sumptuous lifestyle.

== Herodes (III), Eucles (V), Hipparchus ==
The family received Roman citizenship and the Roman nomen Claudius in the reign of Nero. This may have happened during the period of prominence of Herodes (III), who is attested as an archon in the 30s AD and was perhaps a brother of Polycharmus. Another brother of Polycharmus, or a cousin, Tiberius Claudius Eucles (V), is the first member of the family to actually be attested with Roman citizenship. He was archon and kosmetes of the ephebes in the mid-first century AD and priest of Agrippina Minor in the 50s AD.

Tiberius Claudius Hipparchus was the son of Herodes (III) and a dominant figure in Athens during the Flavian period. He was priest of Apollo Pythius and high priest of the Imperial cult in the 80s AD. Suetonius notes Hipparchus' proverbial enormous wealth and Philostratus reports that he was convicted of tyranny by the emperor Domitian and had all of his property confiscated sometime between 93 and 96 AD.Hipparchus had three children: Claudia Athenais, Claudia Alcia, and Claudius Atticus (who was his heir). Hipparchus' second daughter, Claudia Alcia, is only attested as a child. Claudia Athenais married Lucius Vibullius Rufus of Marathon, who was also a citizen of Corinth. They had two children: Lucius Vibullius Hipparchus, who was a powerful figure in Athens and Corinth, and Vibullia Alcia, who married her uncle Claudius Atticus and birthed the next generation of Claudii of Marathon. The alliance between the Claudii of Marathon and the Vibullii was perpetuated through the following generations by mutual adoption of each other's heirs.

== Claudius Atticus ==
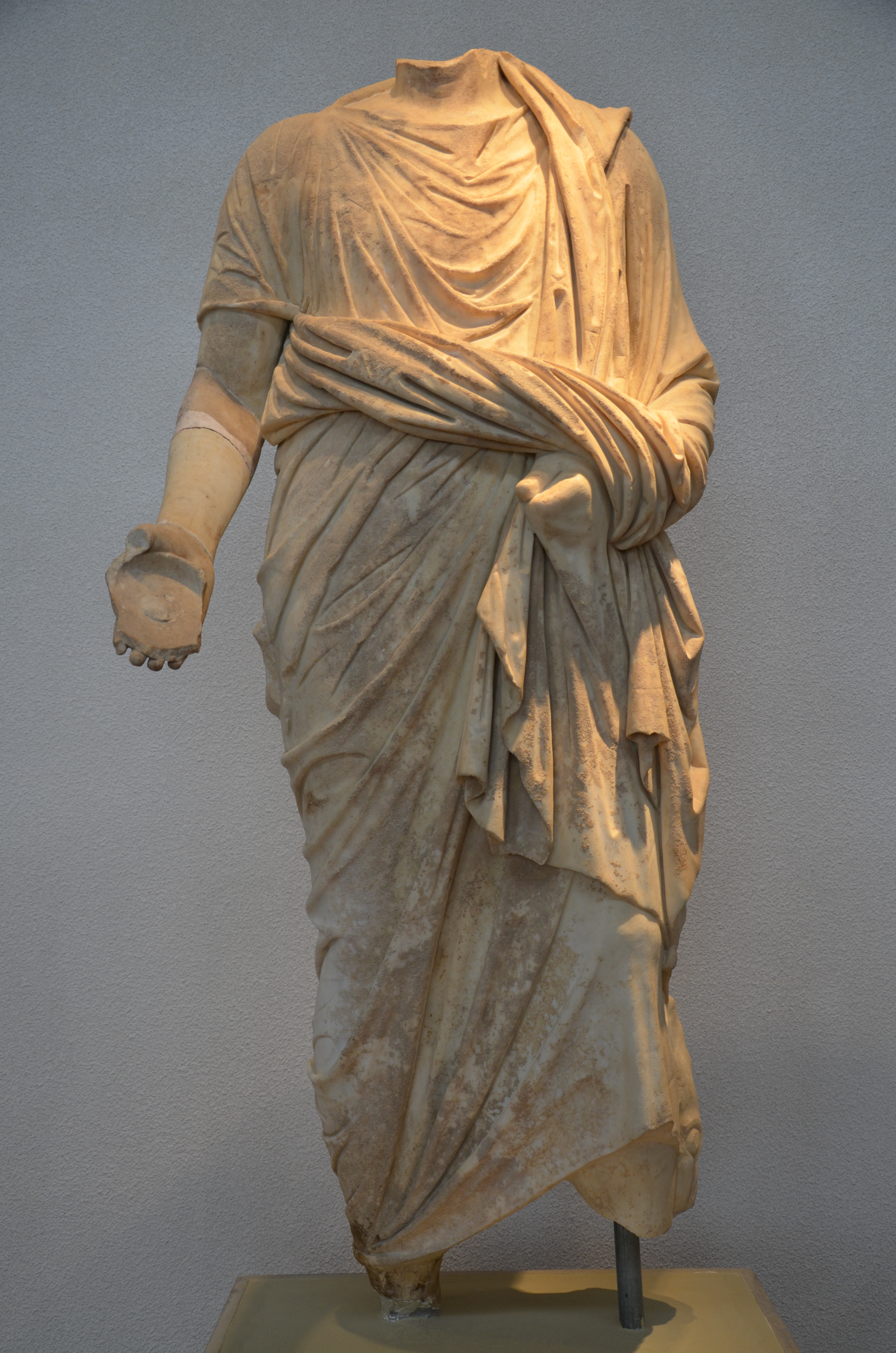
Posthumous image of Claudius Atticus from the Nymphaeum at Olympia.

Hipparchus' son, Claudius Atticus, regained the family's fortune under after the fall of Domitian, having discovered a large treasure trove in his father's house. He wrote to the new emperor Nerva and was assured that the money was his to keep. From around 100 AD, he was high priest of the Imperial cult in Athens. He supported the emperor Hadrian's agenda in Athens, including the completion of the Temple of Olympian Zeus and was Olympian Zeus' first priest. An Athenian decree from the Athenian Agora (Agora XV 322) honours him and his wife Alcia for their support of the Athenian Council and a set of statues of the pair were erected in the Agora by each of the Athenian tribes. It seems that they had established a fund which covered the substantial costs of the Council in perpetuity.

Claudius Atticus was the first member of the family to pursue a career in the Roman administration, acquiring a seat in the Roman Senate in 98 AD. He may have been legate of Judaea from 99 to 102. He was one of the suffect consuls in 133, the first Greek from mainland Greece to reach the post, and probably also its first member in the Roman Senate.

== Herodes Atticus ==
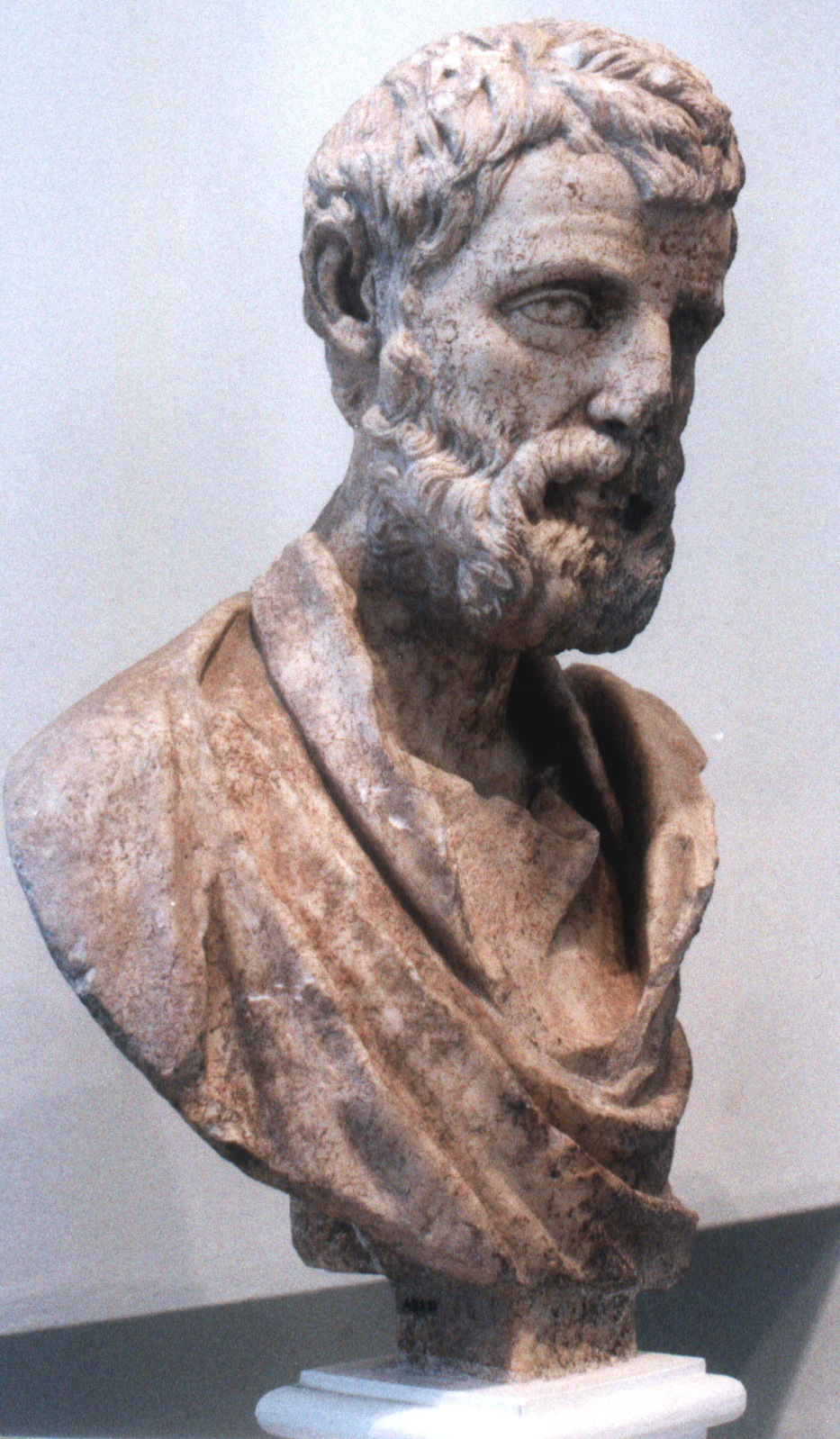
Bust of Herodes Atticus.

Herodes Atticus was the son of Claudius Atticus. He established himself as a leading light of the Second Sophistic rhetorical movement and appears as the central figure in Philostratus' Lives of the Sophists, who paints him as the ideal sophist. Like his father, he pursued a career in the Roman administration. He was corrector of the free cities of Asia in 125 and the first archon of Hadrian's Panhellenion from 137-141 AD, then consul in 143. He married Appia Annia Regilla, a scion of the senatorial Annia family and a relative of the empress Faustina the Elder. He also acted as a tutor in Greek language and learning to the future emperors Marcus Aurelius and Lucius Verus. In Greece and especially Athens, he also held magistracies, serving as Athenian market inspector around 125, as eponymous archon in 126/7 AD, and organised the Panathenaia in 139/40 AD. He also pursued a massive building programme, including the Panathenaic Stadium, the Odeon of Regilla, and the Nymphaeum at Olympia, as well as sumptuous villas in Marathon, Kephisia, and the Peloponnese.

However, he was also remembered as a problematic figure. When he inherited his father's fortune in 138, he cancelled a legacy that had been left to the people of Athens. When Regilla died in mysterious circumstances, he was prosecuted by his in-laws on suspicion of having had her murdered. After the untimely death of his beloved ward, Polydeucion, he erected monuments for him and awarded him heroic honours, without the permission of the Athenian civic authorities, who appealed to the provincial governors. He also seems to have clashed with members of another major Athenian family, the Claudii of Melite for control of the Ceryces clan, which were involved in the organisation of the Eleusinian Mysteries. Literary sources include complaints about the influence of his freedmen and his excessive mourning at the death of relatives and favourites. These conflicts culminated in the trial at Sirmium before emperor Marcus Aurelius in 174, where he was barely acquitted of charges of tyranny. He died in 177 and was buried with honour in the Panathenaic Stadium.

Herodes Atticus and Regilla had at least two daughters, Elpinice and Athenais, and two sons, Bradua and Regillus. Only Bradua survived his father. He was eponymous archon of Athens in 187/8 and herald of the Athenian Council and People in 209/10. He was also Roman consul in 185 AD and perhaps proconsular governor of Asia around 200. No further members of the family are attested at Athens, but Philostratus seems to indicate that Gordian I, briefly Roman emperor in 238 AD, was descended from the family in some way.

== Bibliography ==
- Ameling, Walter (1983). Herodes Atticus: Biographie (in German). Olms. ISBN 978-3-487-07376-7.
- Birley, Anthony (2005), The Roman Government in Britain, Oxford University Press, ISBN 978-0-19-925237-4
- Byrne, Sean G. (2003). Roman citizens of Athens. Leuven: Peeters. ISBN 9042913487.
- Follet, Simone (1998). "Chronologie attique et chronologie delphique (IIe s. a.C.-Ier s. p.C.)". Topoi. Orient-Occident. 8 (1): 243–260. doi:10.3406/topoi.1998.1137.
- Geagan, Daniel J. (1997). Hoff, Michael C.; Rotroff, Susan I. (eds.). The Romanization of Athens : proceedings of an international conference held at Lincoln, Nebraska (April 1996). Oxford, England: Oxbow Books. pp. 19–32. ISBN 978-1-900188-51-7.
- Grasby, K. D. (1975). "The Age, Ancestry, and Career of Gordian I". The Classical Quarterly. 25 (1): 123–130. ISSN 0009-8388.
- Habicht, Christian (1997). Athens from Alexander to Antony. Harvard University Press. ISBN 978-0-674-05111-9.
- Rawson, Elizabeth (1985). "Cicero and the Areopagus". Athenaeum. 63: 44–67.
- Schmalz, Geoffrey C. R. (2009). Augustan and Julio-Claudian Athens : a new epigraphy and prosopography. Leiden: Brill. ISBN 978-90-04-17009-4.
