= Publius Aelius Vibullius Rufus =

2nd century Greco-Roman aristocrat

Publius Aelius Vibullius Rufus ( Greek: Πούβλιος Αίλιος Ουιβούλλιος Ρούφος) was a Greek aristocrat who lived in the 2nd century in the Roman period. He served as archon of Athens in 143–144.

He was a Greek of Athenian descent and was a member of a very wealthy family who were prominent in Athens. He was the son of Lucius Vibullius Hipparchus who served as an Archon of Athens in 118–119 and his unnamed Greek wife. His paternal grandparents were the Athenian aristocrats Claudia Alcia and Lucius Vibullius Rufus, while his paternal aunt was Vibullia Alcia Agrippina, and his paternal uncle was the Roman senator Tiberius Claudius Atticus Herodes. His paternal cousins were the prominent Greek Sophist Herodes Atticus; his brother Tiberius Claudius Atticus Herodianus, and his sister Claudia Tisamenis.

Aelius Rufus had a son called Lucius Vibullius Rufus, who had descendants.

== Sources ==
- Day, J., An economic history of Athens under Roman domination, Ayers Company Publishers, 1973
- Graindor, P., Un milliardaire antique, Ayers Company Publishers, 1979
- Pomeroy, S.B., The murder of Regilla: a case of domestic violence in antiquity, Harvard University Press, 2007
