= Eucles of Marathon =

1st-century BC Athenian statesman

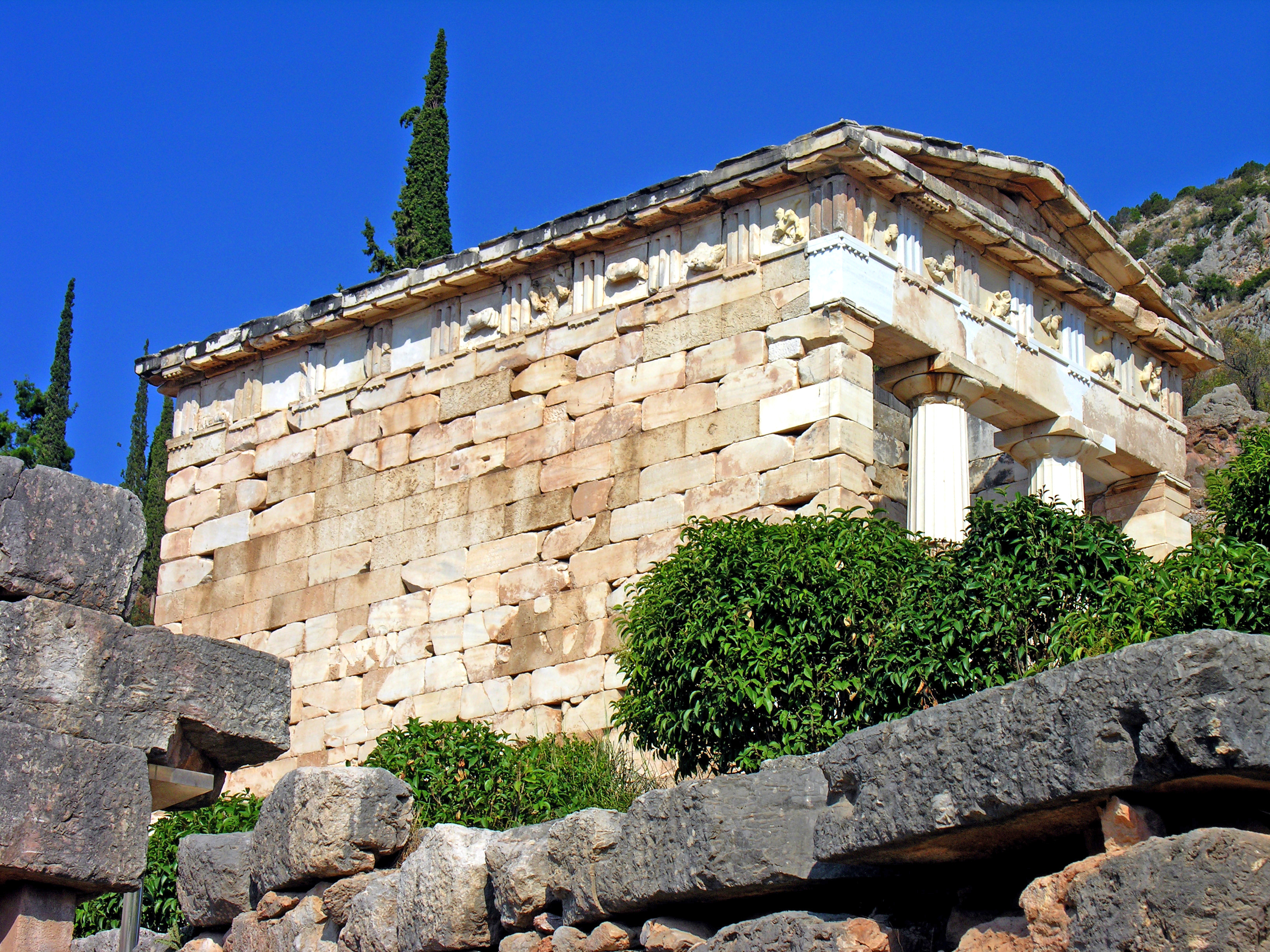
South wall of the Athenian Treasury at Delphi, where the records of Eucles' dodekaides are inscribed.

Eucles of Marathon (Ancient Greek: Εὐκλῆς Ἡρώδου Μαραθώνιος, romanized: Euklēs Hērōdou Marathōnios) was a leading Athenian statesman early in the reign of Augustus. He was responsible for the construction of the Roman Agora in Athens and was the male-line ancestor of the 2nd-century aristocrat, Herodes Atticus.

== Life ==
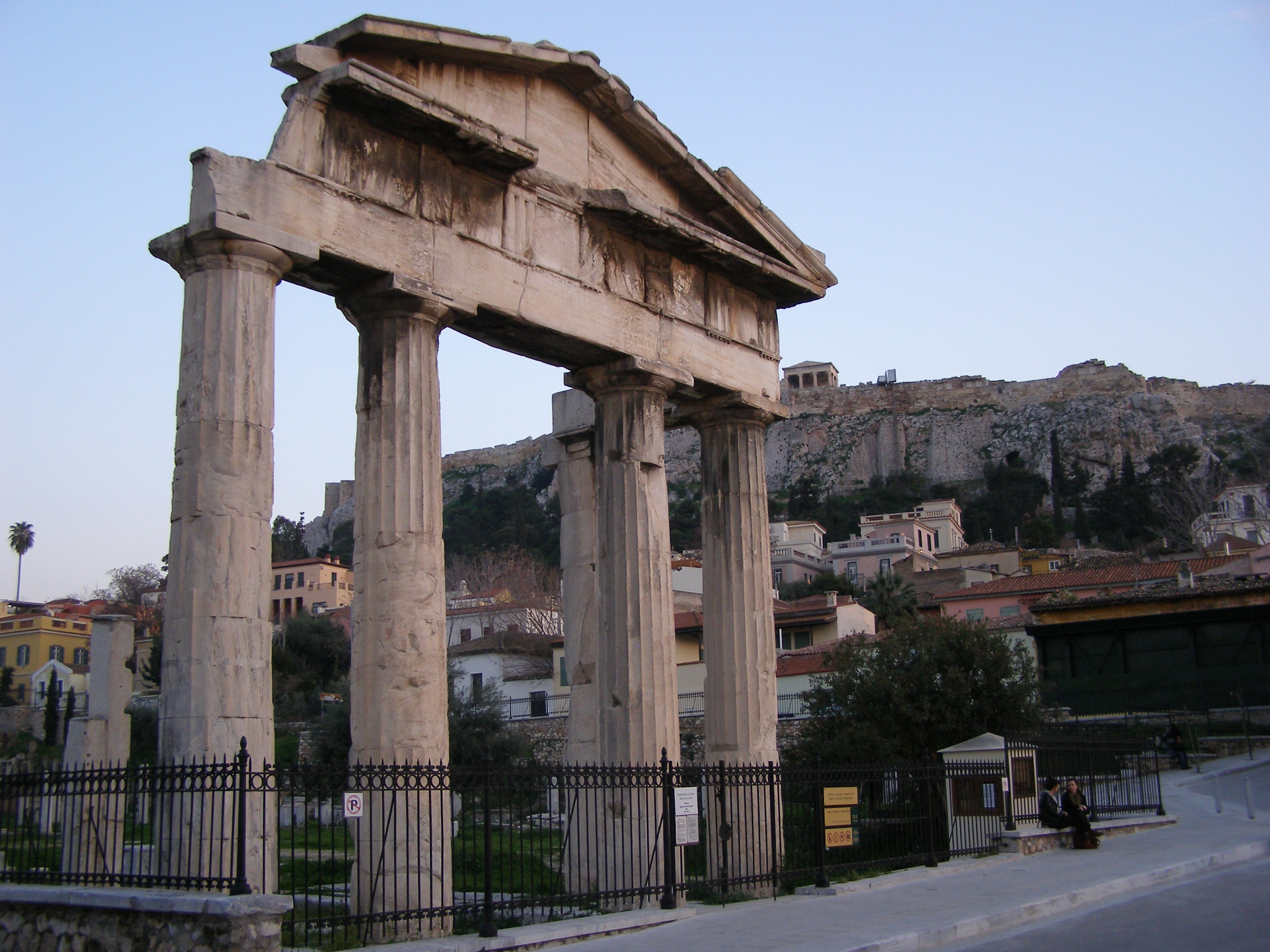
Gate of the Roman Agora.

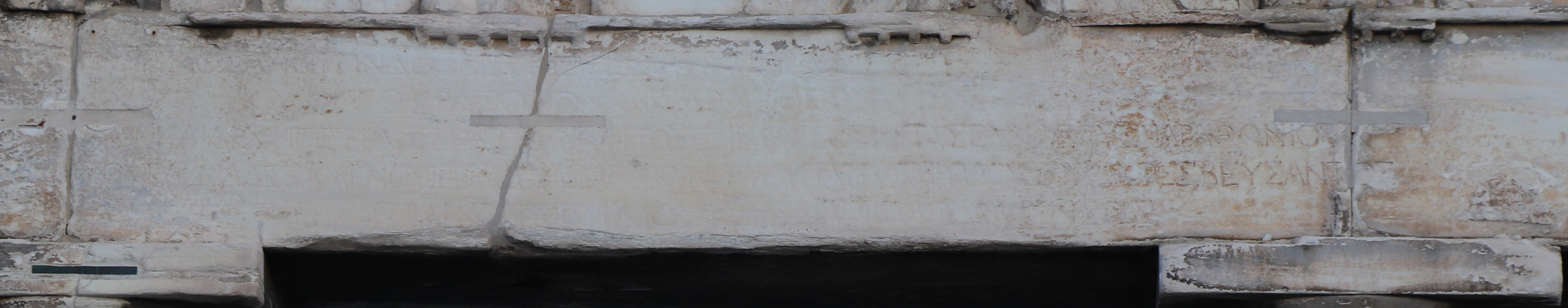
Detail of IG II^{3} 4, 12.

Eucles was the son of Herodes of Marathon, who was archon of Athens in 60/59 BC. Herodes was one of a group of Athenians who came to prominence in the period after the Sack of Athens by Sulla in 86 BC and whose descendants formed the core of the Athenian aristocracy in the Roman Imperial period.

Eucles was the priest of Apollo Pythius from 38 BC, in which role he seems to have been a supporter of Mark Antony until the Battle of Actium in 30 BC. Afterwards, he led a series of five processions, called the dodekaides, to Delphi between 30 and 10 BC. These are recorded in inscriptions on the south wall of the Athenian Treasury at Delphi.

He was archon of Athens in 46/5 BC or in the early 20s BC, and Hoplite General (the chief magistrate of Athens in this period) in the 20s BC. A statue base erected by the Athenians and the inhabitants of Delos commemorates his generalship. He was one of the three leading figures in Athens in the Augustan period, alongside Antipater of Phlya and Pammenes of Marathon.

Eucles' role in the construction of the Roman Agora at Athens is recorded in an inscription on its gate (IG II^{3} 4, 12). It records that Eucles' father, Herodes, had originally secured fifty talents from Julius Caesar for its construction - a letter of Cicero indicates that this occurred in 51/0 BC. For some reason, construction did not take place, and Eucles made a new mission to Caesar's heir, Augustus, to secure the funds, and then oversaw construction, which was completed some time between 27 and 17 BC or, less likely, in 10/9 BC.

== Descendants ==
Eucles probably married a sister of Polycritus of Azenia, one of the exegetai (religious experts) who joined him on the Dodekaides. They had two sons Polycharmus (probably named for a maternal relative) and Herodes (named after his paternal grandfather), both of whom were prominent during the reign of Tiberius. Through Herodes, he was grandfather of Tiberius Claudius Hipparchus, great-grandfather of Claudius Atticus, and great-great grandfather of Herodes Atticus. He may have had a daughter, called Simarion.

== Bibliography ==
- Bowersock, Glen W. (2002). "The New Hellenism of Augustan Athens". Annali della Scuola Normale Superiore di Pisa. Classe di Lettere e Filosofia. 7 (1): 1–16. ISSN 0392-095X. JSTOR 24308475.
- Byrne, Sean G. (2003). Roman citizens of Athens. Leuven: Peeters. ISBN 9042913487.
- Follet, Simone (1998). "Chronologie attique et chronologie delphique (IIe s. a.C.-Ier s. p.C.)". Topoi. Orient-Occident. 8 (1): 243–260. doi:10.3406/topoi.1998.1137.
- Geagan, Daniel J. (1997). Hoff, Michael C.; Rotroff, Susan I. (eds.). The Romanization of Athens : proceedings of an international conference held at Lincoln, Nebraska (April 1996). Oxford, England: Oxbow Books. pp. 19–32. ISBN 978-1-900188-51-7.
- Habicht, Christian (1997). Athens from Alexander to Antony. Harvard University Press. ISBN 978-0-674-05111-9.
- Schmalz, Geoffrey C. R. (2009). Augustan and Julio-Claudian Athens : a new epigraphy and prosopography. Leiden: Brill. ISBN 978-90-04-17009-4.
