= Athens under Roman rule =

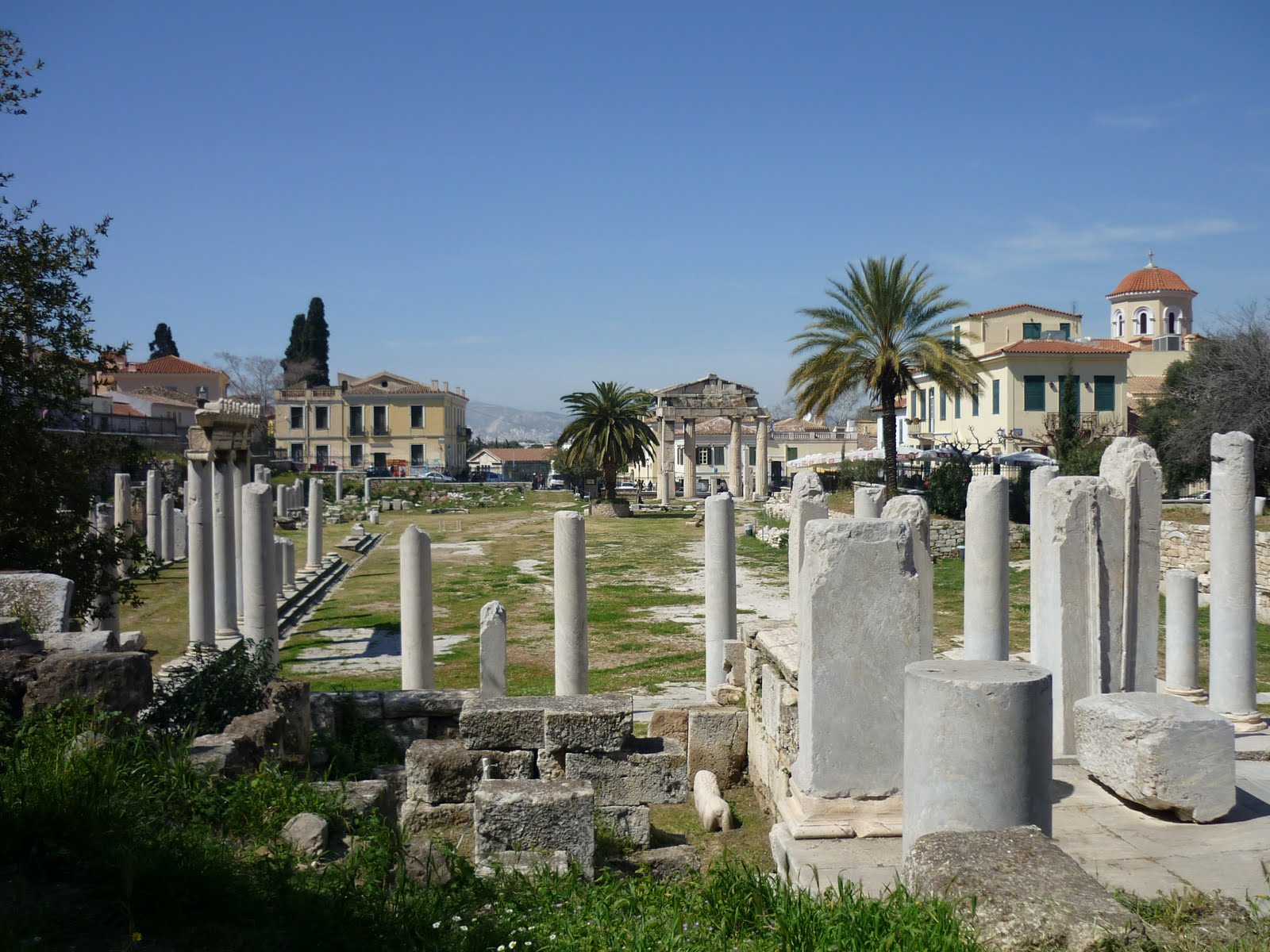
The ruins of the Roman Agora, the second commercial centre of ancient Athens

Athens under Roman rule refers to the period from the Roman conquest of the city in the 1st century BC to Late Antiquity, during which Athens formed part of the Roman Empire while retaining a measure of autonomy as a free city. Despite severe destruction during a siege in 86 BC, the city was gradually rebuilt and continued to flourish as a major centre of philosophy, education, and culture in the eastern Mediterranean.

== History ==
In 88 BC in the First Mithridatic War, Athens and other Greek city-states revolted against Rome. Part of the resentment towards Rome was due to the suppression of democracy. At this time Mithridates VI installed Aristion as tyrant. The revolt was suppressed by the Roman general Sulla who leveled most of the city's fortifications and homes after the Siege of Athens and Piraeus, although many civic buildings and monuments were left intact.

The Macedonian astronomer Andronicus of Cyrrhus subsequently designed the Tower of the Winds for the Roman forum, which mostly survives to the present day. Under Roman rule, Athens was given the status of a free city because of its widely admired schools, which meant it was largely autonomous and avoided direct Roman taxation. When Mark Antony was ruling the eastern provinces he would often use Athens as his base.

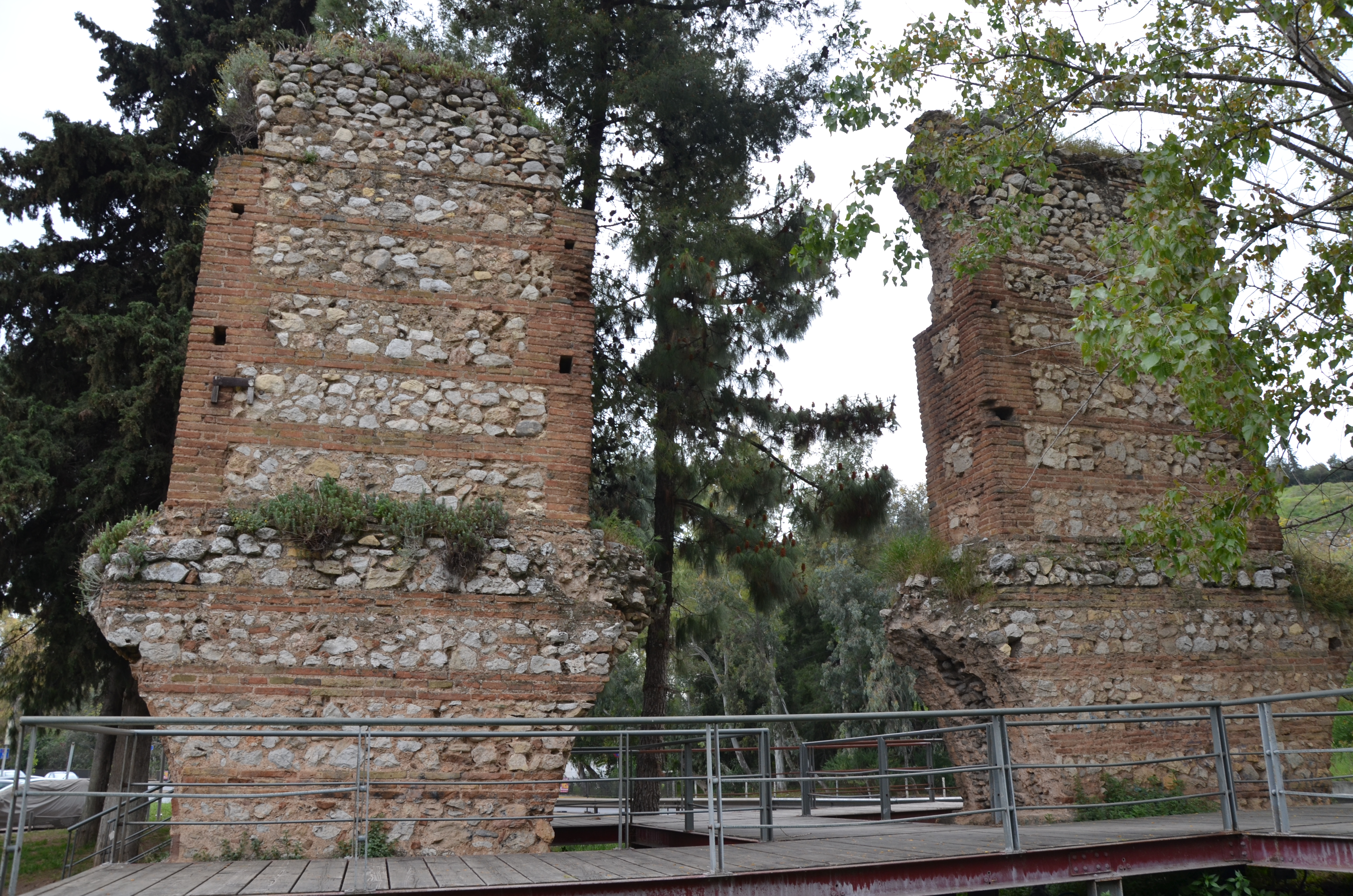
Hadrianic aqueduct bridge in Nea Ionia

Many temples and public buildings were built in Greece by emperors and wealthy Roman nobility, especially in Athens. Julius Caesar began construction of the Roman agora in Athens, which was finished by Augustus. The main gate, the Gate of Athena Archegetis, was dedicated to the patron goddess of Athens, Athena. The Agrippeia was built in the centre of the Ancient Agora of Athens by Marcus Vipsanius Agrippa.

Emperor Hadrian (r. 117–138 AD) was an Athenian citizen and a philhellene who before he became emperor had served as eponymous archon of Athens. He saw himself as an heir to Pericles and made many contributions to Athens. He built the Library of Hadrian in the city and completed the construction of the Temple of Olympian Zeus, some 638 years after its construction had been started by Athenian tyrants but ended because of the belief that building on such a scale would cause hubris. He also constructed a gymnasium, an aqueduct which is still in use, several other temples and sanctuaries and a bridge. Adrianou (Hadrian Street) exists to this day, leading from the arch to the Ancient Agora. The Athenians built the Arch of Hadrian to commemorate the refoundation of the city by Hadrian.

As with most of Greece, the Church of Athens was established by St. Paul during his second missionary journey, probably in 50 or 51 AD, when he Paul daily preached to the Jews and God-fearing Greeks in the synagogue as well as to the Agora. He was taken to the court of the Areopagus where he preached to the elite including the Greek intellectuals. According to the Acts of the Apostles (17:16–34), after the sermon, a number of people became followers of Paul, thus forming the kernel of the Church in Athens. Dionysius the Areopagite was the first Bishop of Athens.

The city was sacked by the Heruli in 267 AD, resulting in the burning of all the public buildings, the plundering of the lower city and the damaging of the Agora and Acropolis. After the sack, the city to the north of the Acropolis was hastily refortified on a smaller scale, with the agora left outside the walls. Athens remained a centre of learning and philosophy during its 500 years of Roman rule, patronized by emperors such as Nero as well as Hadrian.

In the early 4th century AD the Eastern Roman Empire began to be governed from Constantinople, and with the construction and expansion of the imperial city, many of Athens's works of art were taken by the emperors to adorn it. The Empire became Christianised, and the use of Latin declined in favour of exclusive use of Greek; in the Roman imperial period, both languages had been used. In the later Roman period, Athens was ruled by the emperors continuing until the 13th century, its citizens identifying themselves as citizens of the Roman Empire ("Rhomaioi"). The conversion of the empire from paganism to Christianity greatly affected Athens, resulting in reduced reverence for the city. Ancient monuments such as the Parthenon, Erechtheion and the Hephaisteion (Theseion) were converted into churches. As the empire became increasingly anti-pagan, Athens became a provincial town and experienced fluctuating fortunes.

The city remained an important centre of learning, especially of Neoplatonism—with notable pupils including Gregory of Nazianzus, Basil of Caesarea and the Roman emperor Julian (r. 355–363)—and consequently a centre of paganism. Christian items do not appear in the archaeological record until the early 5th century. The sack of the city by the Herules in 267 and by the Visigoths under their king Alaric I (r. 395–410) in 396, however, dealt a heavy blow to the city's fabric and fortunes, and Athens was henceforth confined to a small fortified area that embraced a fraction of the ancient city. The emperor Justinian I (r. 527–565) banned the teaching of philosophy by pagans in 529, an event whose impact on the city is much debated, but is generally taken to mark the end of the ancient history of Athens.

== See also ==
- History of Athens
- Greece in the Roman era
- Titus Pomponius Atticus
- Classical Athens

== Bibliography ==
- Bourchier, James David (1911). "Greece" . In Chisholm, Hugh (ed.). Encyclopædia Britannica (11th ed.). Cambridge University Press.
- Holland, Tom (2004). Rubicon: The Triumph and Tragedy of the Roman Republic. London: Abacus. ISBN 0-349-11563-X.
- Kouremenos, Anna (2022). "The City of Hadrian and not of Theseus': A Cultural History of Hadrian's Arch". The Province of Achaea in the 2nd century CE: The Past Present. London: Routledge. Archived from the original on 23 August 2022.
- Travlos, John (1971). Pictorial Dictionary of Ancient Athens. London: Thames and Hudson.
- Tung, Anthony (2001). Preserving the World's Great Cities: The Destruction and Renewal of the Historic Metropolis. New York: Three Rivers Press. ISBN 0-609-80815-X.
