= East Propylon =

Coordinates: 37.9742°N 23.7267°E

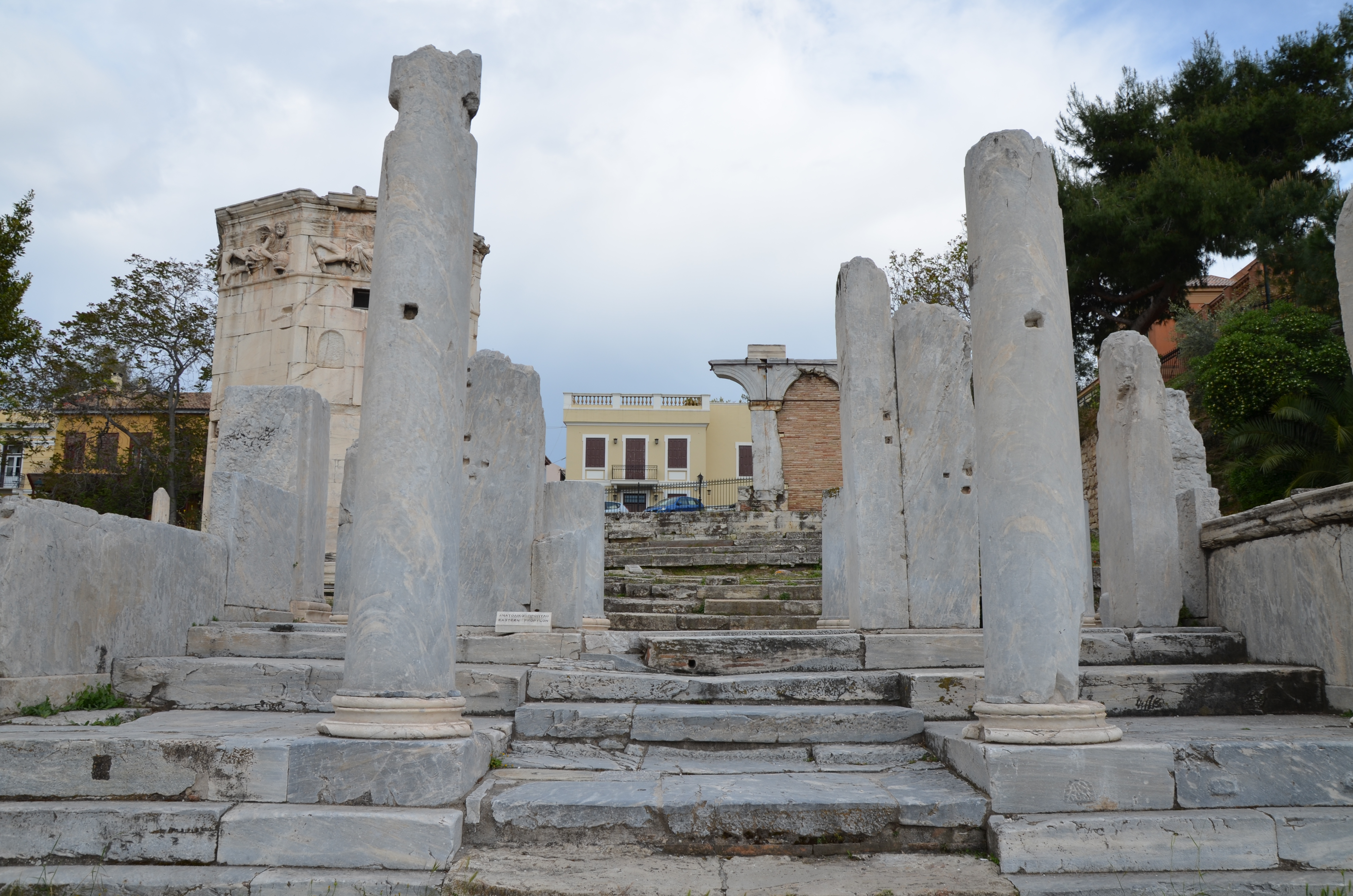
East Propylon

The East Propylon is the eastern entrance of the Roman Agora in Athens. Built in 19-11 BCE, it consisted of Ionic columns made of gray Hymettian marble.
