= Free city (classical antiquity) =

Self-governing city in the time of Ancient Greece and Rome

A free city (Latin: civitas libera, urbs liberae condicionis; Greek: ἐλευθέρα καὶ αὐτόνομος πόλις) was a self-governed city during the Hellenistic and Roman Imperial eras. The status was given by the king or emperor, who nevertheless supervised the city's affairs through his epistates or curator (Greek: epimeletes) respectively. Several autonomous cities had also the right to issue civic coinage bearing the name of the city.

== History ==
Examples of free cities include Amphipolis, which after 357 BC remained permanently a free and autonomous city inside the Macedonian kingdom; and probably also Cassandreia and Philippi.

Under Seleucid rule, numerous cities enjoyed autonomy and issued coins; some of them, like Seleucia and Tarsus, continued to be free cities, even after the Roman conquest by Pompey. Nicopolis was also constituted a free city by Augustus, its founder. Thessalonica after the battle of Philippi, was made a free city in 42 BC, when it had sided with the victors. Athens, a free city with its own laws, appealed to Hadrian to devise new laws which he modelled on those given by Draco and Solon.

Autonomi or rather Autonomoi was the name given by the Greeks to those states which were governed by their own laws, and were not subject to any foreign power. This name was also given to those cities subject to the Romans, which were permitted to enjoy their own laws, and elect their own magistrates. This permission was regarded as a great privilege, and mark of honour; and it is accordingly found recorded on coins and medals (e.g. Metropolis of the Antiochians autonomous).

== See also ==
- Panhellenion
- Free imperial city of the German Holy Roman Empire
