= Claudia Tisamenis =

2nd century Greco-Roman noblewoman

Claudia Tisamenis (Greek: Κλαυδία) was a Greek aristocratic woman that lived in the 2nd century in the Roman Empire.

== Ancestry and family ==
Tisamenis was of Athenian descent. Her ancestry can be traced to the Athenian noble woman Elpinice (a half sister of statesman Cimon and daughter of politician Miltiades the Younger). She had an ancestor four generations removed from her called Polycharmus. Polycharmus from 9/8 BC–22/23, could have served as an archon of Athens. Her family bears the Roman family name Claudius. There is a possibility that a paternal ancestor of hers received Roman citizenship, from an unknown member of the Claudius gens.

Tisamenis was born to a distinguished and very rich family of consular rank. She was the daughter of Roman senator Tiberius Claudius Atticus Herodes and the wealthy heiress Vibullia Alcia Agrippina. Tisamenis had two brothers: the prominent Greek sophist Lucius Vibullius Hipparchus Tiberius Claudius Atticus Herodes and Tiberius Claudius Atticus Herodianus. Her maternal grandparents were Claudia Alcia and Lucius Vibullius Rufus, while her paternal grandfather was Hipparchus and his unnamed wife.

Her parents were uncle and niece, her maternal grandmother being her father's sister. Her maternal uncle Lucius Vibullius Hipparchus was archon of Athens in the years 99–100 and her maternal cousin, Publius Aelius Vibullius Rufus was archon of Athens in 143–144.

== Life ==
According to the French historian Christian Settipani, Tisamenis was born about 100 in an unknown place in Greece. She spent her childhood travelling between Greece and Italy. Other modern historians have argued that Tisamenis could have married a Greek aristocrat in Sparta from the Achaea Province. The name of Tisamenis has been found as a testamentary disposition on an erection of a family statue-group in her marital home-city. According to Settipani, Tisamenis married an unnamed Roman Aristocrat, by whom she had a daughter called Claudia (b. c. 120), who might have been the grandmother of Roman Emperor Gordian I.

== Sources ==
- Day, J., An economic history of Athens under Roman domination, Ayers Company Publishers, 1973
- Graindor, P., Un milliardaire antique, Ayers Company Publishers, 1979
- Continuité gentilice et continuité sénatoriale dans les familles sénatoriales romaines à l'époque impériale, 2000
- Cartledge, P., Hellenistic and Roman Sparta: a tale of two cities, Routledge, 2002
- Wilson, N.G., Encyclopedia of Ancient Greece, Routledge 2006
- Pomeroy, S.B., The murder of Regilla: a case of domestic violence in antiquity, Harvard University Press, 2007
- https://web.archive.org/web/20110716083759/http://www.sleepinbuff.com/13history.pdf
