= Panhellenion =

Historic league of Greek city-states

The Panhellenion (Greek: Πανελλήνιον) or Panhellenium was a league of Greek city-states established in the year 131–132 AD by the Roman Emperor Hadrian while he was touring the Roman provinces of Greece. The League was established following a ceremony at the Temple of Olympian Zeus in Athens, the capital city of the Panhellenion. Evidence suggests that the Panhellenion continued to survive until the 250s AD.

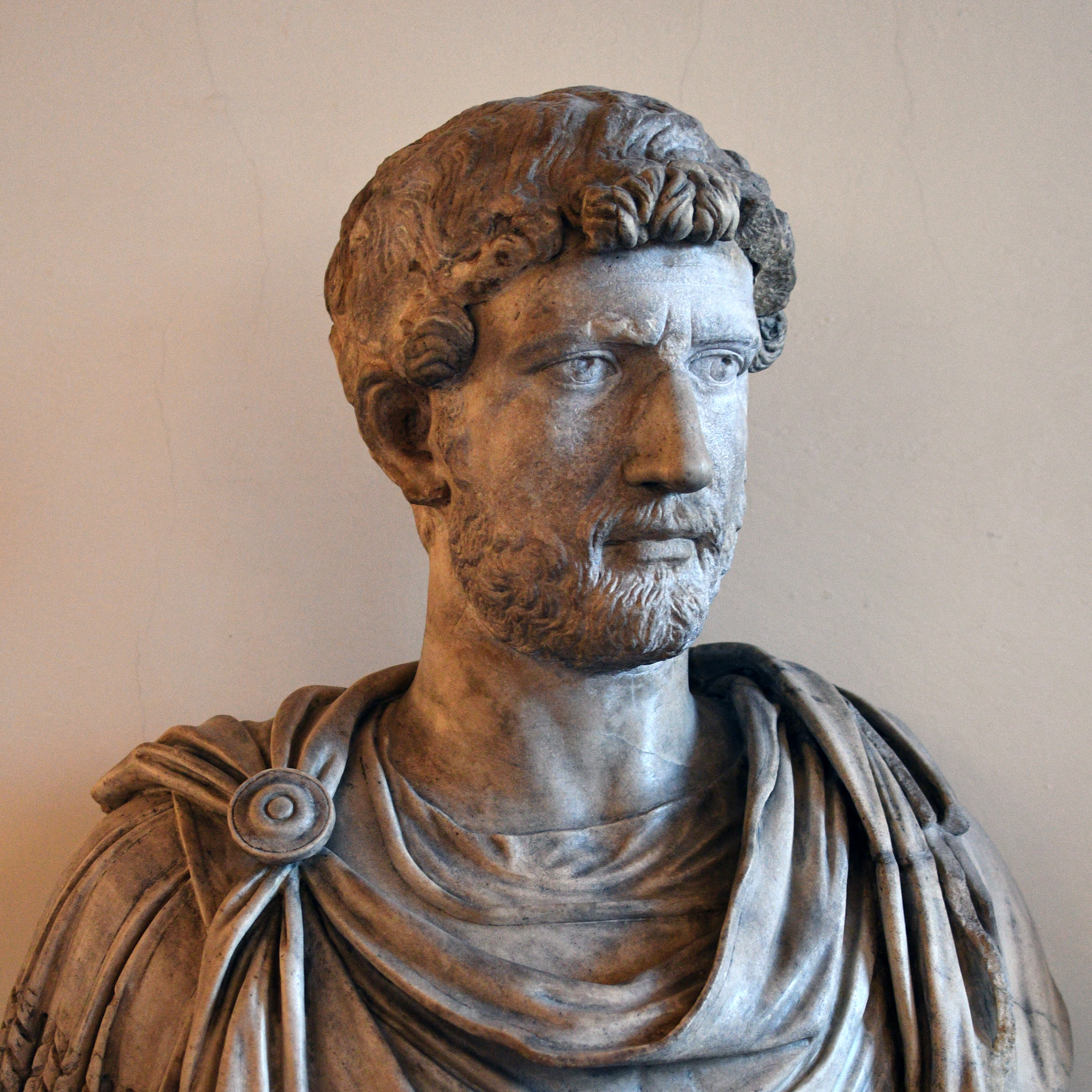
Bust of Emperor Hadrian

Hadrian was a philhellene and idealized the Classical past of Greece; this was his own, personal attempt to recreate the apparent "unified Greece" of the 5th century BC, when the Greeks took on the Persian enemy.

The Panhellenion was primarily a religious organization, and most of its deeds were related to self-governance. Admission to the Panhellenion was subject to the scrutiny of a city's Hellenic descent.

In 137 AD, the Panhellenic Games were held at Athens as part of the ideal of Panhellenism and harking back to the Panathenaic Festival of the fifth century.

From inscriptions found, member cities included Athens, Megara, Sparta, Chalcis, Argos, Acraephiae, Epidaurus, Amphicleia, Methana, Corinth, Hypata, Demetrias, Rhodes, Thessalonica, Magnesia on the Maeander, Eumeneia, Cyrene, as well the cities of Crete.

The name was revived by the first governor of modern Greece, Ioannis Kapodistrias, for a short-lived advisory body in 1828.
