= Simone Follet =

French historian (1935–2021)

Simone Follet (23 January 1935 – 16 February 2021) was a French epigrapher and philologist, specialising in Roman Greece, especially Athens.

== Life ==
Follet attended lycée at Mâcon and at Versailles. In 1955, she enrolled in the École normale supérieure de jeunes filles in Sèvres, studying literature. After her graduation in 1958, Follet worked at the University of Clermont-Ferrand until 1961, when she returned to the École normale supérieure to study Ancient Greek philology and literature.

In 1975, Follet became the adjunct director of the École normale supérieure, a post which she retained until 1987. From 1981 to 1985, she was also the director of a CNRS project called "Etude de textes sophistiques et techniques tardifs" (Study of Sophistic Texts and Late Techniques), based at the École normale supérieure. In this role, she was noted for her mentorship of younger female scholars of Classical philology.

She was then a professor at Caen, Nanterre, and Paris-Sorbonne. After her retirement in 2000, she remained an emirita professor of the Sorbonne. She was elected President of the French Association des Études grecques (Association for Hellenic Studies) for 2001.

=== Research ===
Follet's research focussed on the epigraphy of Roman Imperial Athens. Her 1976 book Athènes au II^{e} et au III^{e} siècle. Études chronologiques et prosopographiques (Athens in the 2nd and 3rd centuries: Chronological and Prosopographic Studies), developed from her doctoral thesis, remains the standard work on the chronology of Imperial-period Athens. Follet produced numerous articles and book chapters on individual inscriptions or groups of inscriptions, often in collaboration with Dina Peppas Delmousou of the Epigraphical Museum. She was also a regular contributor to the Bulletin épigraphique in Revue des études grecques and L'Année épigraphique.

Follet also worked on imperial-period Greek literature and philosophy, especially the second Sophistic author Philostratus, publishing the standard French edition of his Heroicus in 2017 and collaborating with Bernadette Peuch on a standard edition of his Lives of the Sophists, which will be published posthumously. She also contributed to work on a standard edition of Callistratus's Descriptions and provided entries for the Dictionnaire des Philosophes Antiques.

== Bibliography ==
- Follet, Simone (1976). Athènes au II^{e} et au III^{e} siècle: études chronologiques et prosopographiques (in French). Paris: Société d'edition "Les Belles Lettres. ISBN 978-2-251-32532-3.
- Follet, Simone (1977). "La datation de l'Archonte Dionysios (IG II^{2}, 3968) : ses conséquences archéologiques, littéraires et épigraphiques". Revue des Études Grecques. 90 (428): 47–54. doi:10.3406/reg.1977.4128.
- Follet, Simone (1987). "Trois cités chypriotes disparues dans une monodie anonyme tardive". Cahiers du Centre d'Études Chypriotes. 8 (1): 27–30. doi:10.3406/cchyp.1987.1208.
- Follet, Simone (1988). "Éphèbes étrangers à Athènes : Romains, Milésiens, Chypriotes etc". Cahiers du Centre d'Études Chypriotes. 9 (1): 19–32. doi:10.3406/cchyp.1988.1213.
- Follet, Simone (1989). "Contribution a la chronologie attique du premier siecle de notre ere". In Walker, S.; Cameron, Averil (eds.). The Greek Renaissance in the Roman Empire. London: Oxford University Press. pp. 37–44. JSTOR 43768499.
- Follet, Simone (1994). "Lettres d'Hadrien aux Épicuriens d'Athènes (14.2- 14.3.125): SEG III 226 + IG II² 1097". Revue des Études Grecques. 107 (509): 158–171. doi:10.3406/reg.1994.2610.
- Peppa-Delmouzou, Dina; Follet, Simone (1997). "Le décret de Thyatire sur les bienfaits d'Hadrien et le « Panthéon » d'Hadrien à Athènes (IG II² 1088 + 1090 + IG III 3985, complétés = TAM V 2, 1180, complété)". Bulletin de Correspondance Hellénique. 121 (1): 291–309. doi:10.3406/bch.1997.1634.
- Follet, Simone (1998). "Chronologie attique et chronologie delphique (IIe s. a.C.-Ier s. p.C.)". Topoi. Orient-Occident. 8 (1): 243–260. doi:10.3406/topoi.1998.1137.
- Follet, Simone; Peppas-Delmousou, Dina (2000). "La légende de Thésée sous l'empereur Commode d'après le discours d'un Éphèbe athénien (IG II^{2}, 2291A + 1125, complétés)". Romanité et cité chrétienne. Permanences et mutations, intégration et exclusion Du I^{er} au VI^{e} Siècle. Mélanges en l'honneur d'Yvette Duval. Paris: De Boccard. pp. 11–17. ISBN 978-2701801360.
- Follet, Simone (2000). "Les deux archontes Pamménès du Ier siècle a.C. à Athènes". Revue des Études Grecques. 113 (1): 188–192. doi:10.3406/reg.2000.4402.
- Follet, Simone; Peppas-Delmousou, Dina (2001). "Les dédicaces chorégiques d'époque Flavienne et Antonine à Athènes". In Salomies, Olli (ed.). The Greek East in the Roman Context. Helsinki: Bookstore Tiedekirja. ISBN 9519880607.
- Follet, Simone (2005). "Deux inscriptions attiques inédites copiées par l'abbé Michel Fourmont (Parisinus Suppl. gr. 854)". Revue des Études Grecques. 118 (1): 1–14. doi:10.3406/reg.2005.4604.
- Follet, Simone (2008). "Stèle funéraire d'Aristoménès de Stagire, exécuteur testamentaire d'Aristote (IG II^{2} 10744 + IG II 3421)". Revue des Études Grecques. 121 (2): 469–478. doi:10.3406/reg.2008.7982.
- Follet, Simone; Peppas Delmousou, Dina (2008). "Inscriptions du Musée épigraphique d'Athènes". Bulletin de Correspondance Hellénique. 132 (1): 473–553. doi:10.3406/bch.2008.7511.
- Follet, Simone; Peppas Delmousou, Dina (2009). "Inscriptions du Musée épigraphique d'Athènes (II)". Bulletin de Correspondance Hellénique. 133 (1): 391–470. doi:10.3406/bch.2009.7570.
- Follet, Simone, ed. (2004). L'hellénisme d'époque romaine nouveaux documents, nouvelles approches (Ier s. a.C - IIIe s. p.C.) : actes du colloque international à la mémoire de Louis Robert, Paris, 7-8 juillet 2000. Paris: De Boccard. ISBN 2-7018-0174-5.
- Follet, Simone, ed. (2017). Philostrate: Sur les héros. Paris: Les Belles Lettres. ISBN 9782251006178.
- Follet †, Simone (2020). "Décrets attiques honorant Septime Sévère, ses fils Caracalla et Géta et son épouse Julia Domna (Agora XVI, 340 et 341)". Bulletin de correspondance hellénique. 144 (2). doi:10.4000/bch.1175. S2CID 253192623.
