= Roman Agora =

Ancient square in Athens

Coordinates: 37°58′27″N 23°43′35″E

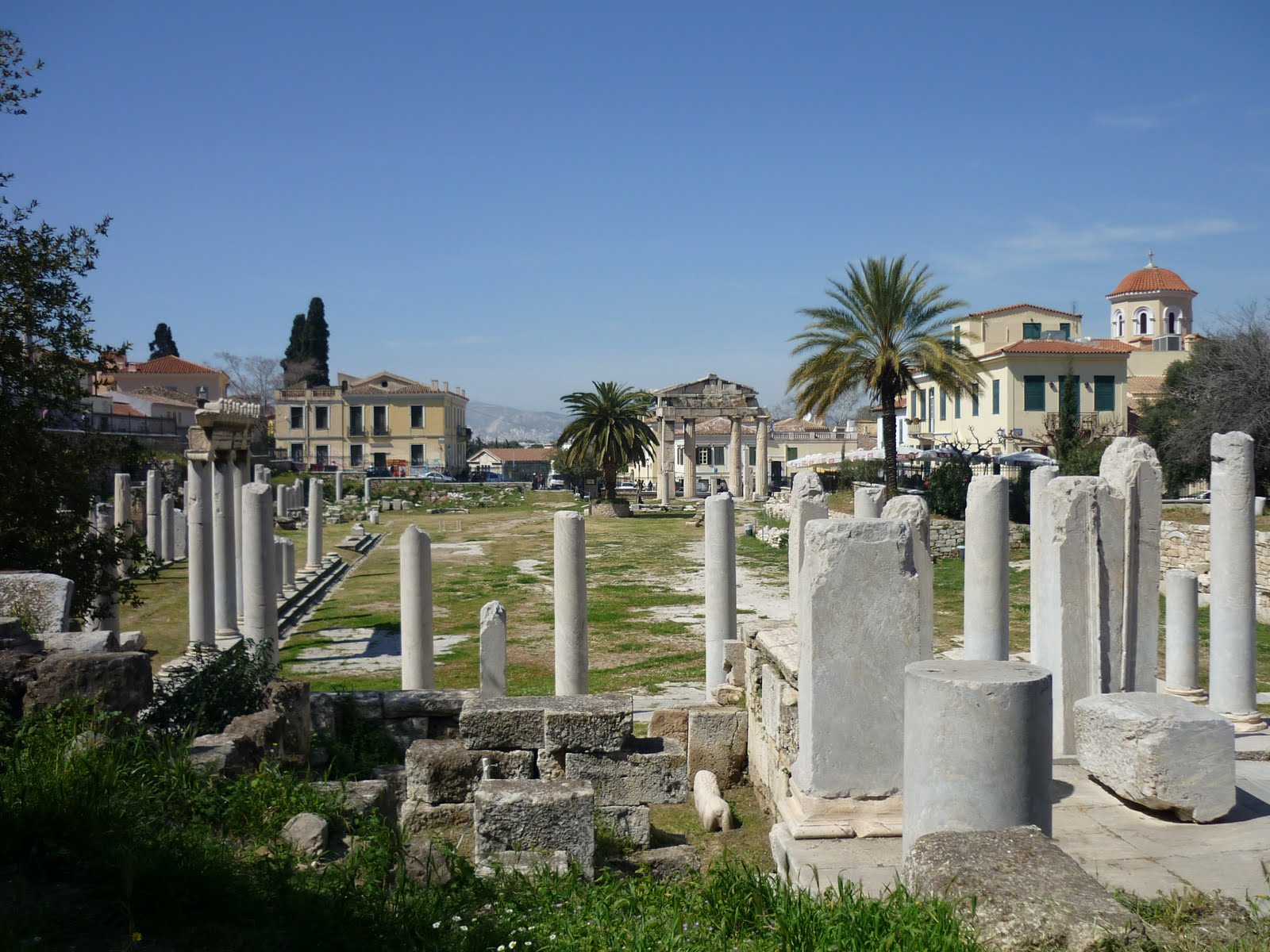
Remains of the Roman Agora built in Athens during the Roman period

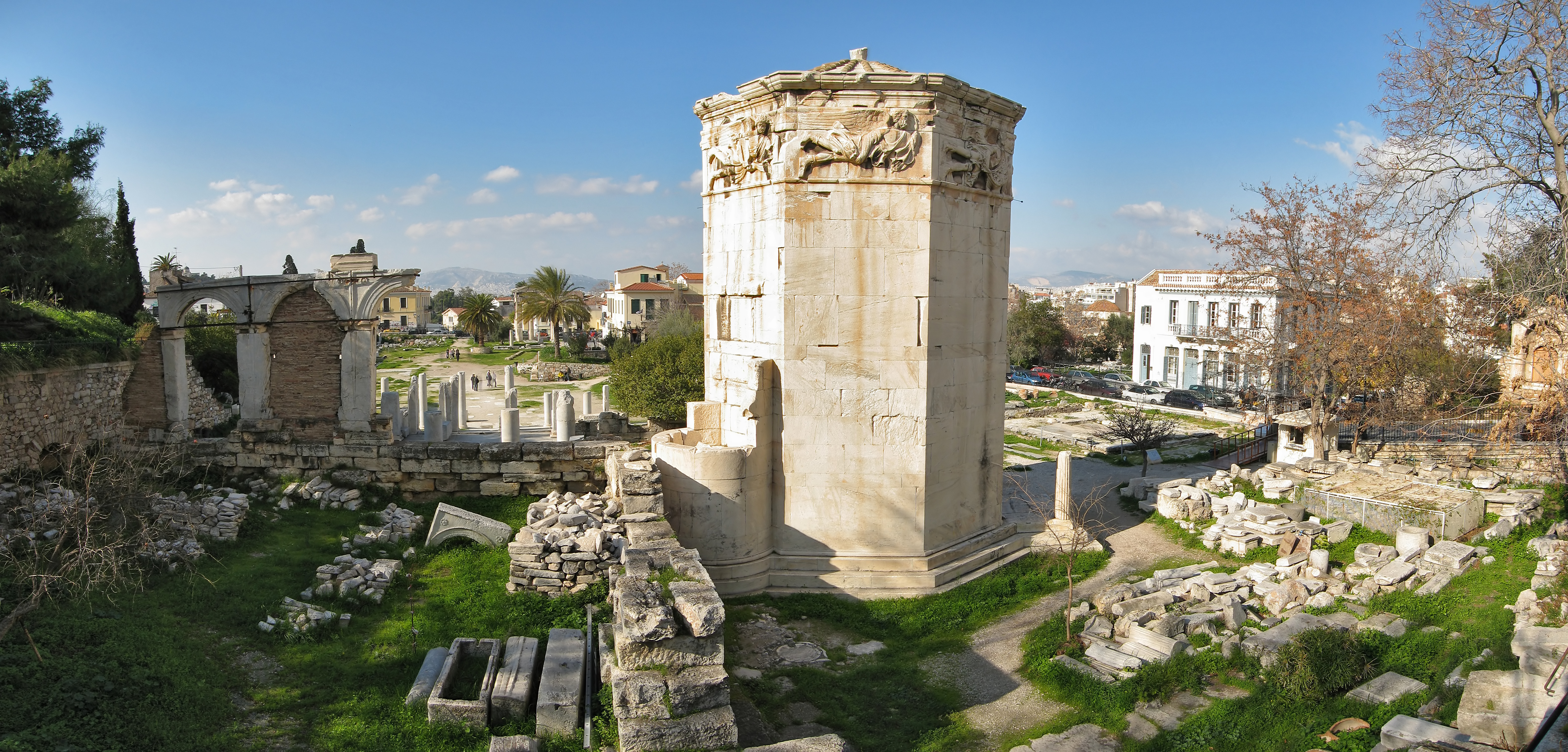
Roman Agora and the Tower of the Winds

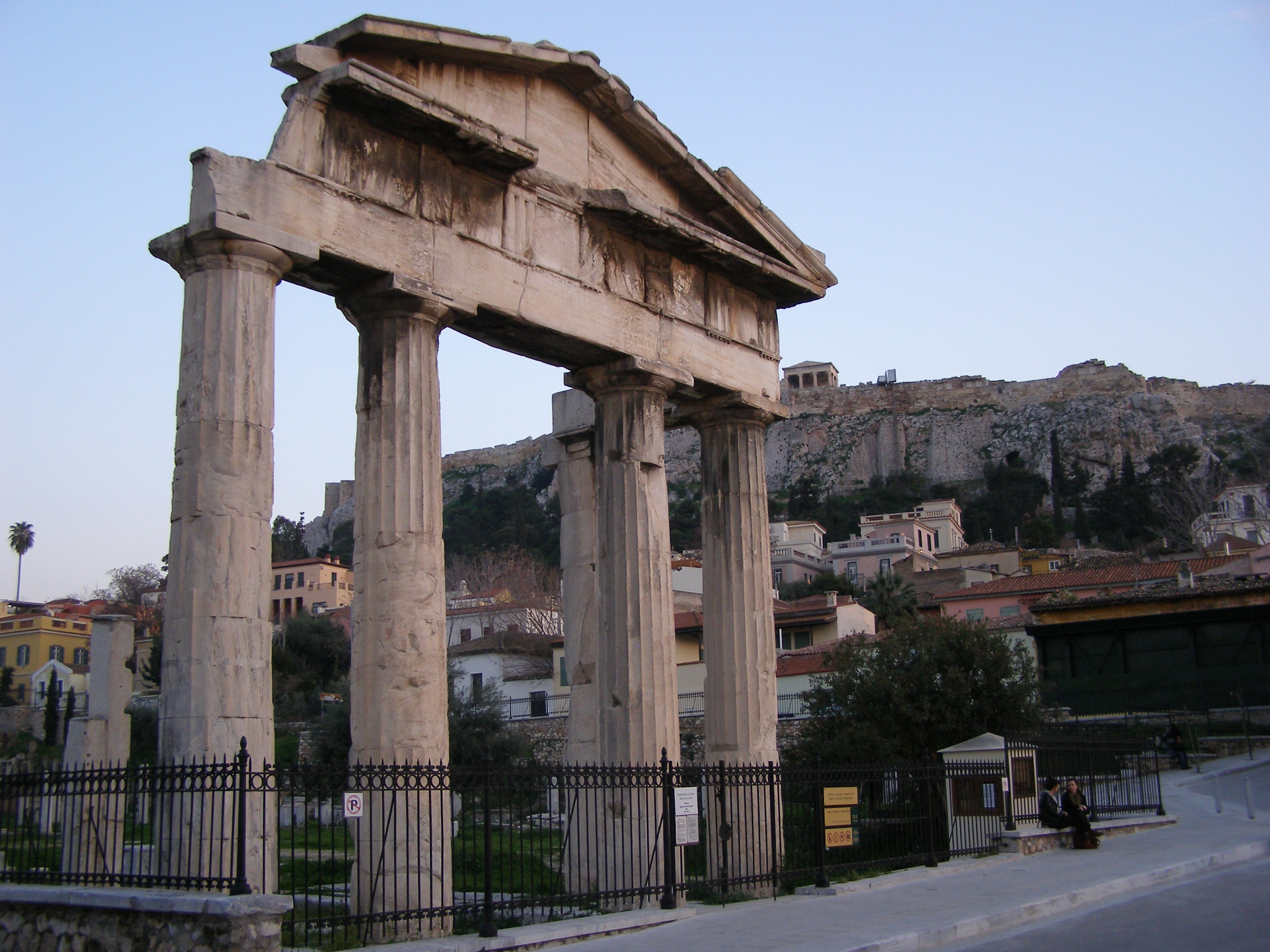
Gate of Athena Archegetis

The Roman Agora (Greek: Ρωμαϊκή Αγορά) is a ruined agora in Athens built in the Roman era to the east of the Ancient Agora and the north of the Acropolis.

== History ==
The Roman Agora was built around 100 metres east of the original agora by Eucles of Marathon between 27 BC and 17 BC (or possibly in 10 BC), using funds donated by Augustus, in fulfilment of a promise originally made by Julius Caesar in 51 BC. The Roman Agora has not today been fully excavated, but is known to have been an open space surrounded by a peristyle. To its south was a fountain. To its west, behind a marble colonnade, were shops and a Doric propylon (entrance), the Gate of Athena Archegetis. To its east was an Ionic gate, the East Propylon, next to the Tower of the Winds and a set of "vespasianae" (public toilets). An inscription records the existence of an Agoranomion (an office for market officials), while another, set on the propylon of Athena Archegetis records a decree from Hadrian's reign regarding the tax obligations of oil merchants.

== See also ==
- Hadrian's Library
- Lists of Roman sites

== Bibliography ==
- Camp, John M. (2001). The Archaeology of Athens. London: Yale University Press. ISBN 0300081979.
- Schmalz, Geoffrey C. R. (2009). Augustan and Julio-Claudian Athens : a new epigraphy and prosopography. Leiden: Brill. ISBN 978-90-04-17009-4.
- Ζαρμακούπη, Μ. (2023). "Ρωμαϊκή Αθήνα". Αρχαιολογία και Τέχνες 141, 125-127, 139.
