= Antipater of Phlya =

1st-century BC seven time Hoplite General

Antipater of Phlya (Ancient Greek: Ἀντίπατρος Ἀντιπατρου Φλυεύς, romanized: Antipatros Antipatrou Phlyeus, fl. 20s-10s BC) was a leading statesman at Athens during the reign of Augustus, serving as Hoplite General (the chief Athenian magistracy) an unprecedented seven times. He appears to have been the main force in the establishment of the Imperial cult of Augustus at Athens. He is known exclusively from inscriptions.

== Life ==
Nothing is known about Antipater's father (also called Antipater) or his earlier ancestry, except that he derived from the deme of Phlya and thus belonged to the tribe of Ptolemais. He is one of several Athenian statesmen whose families had apparently not been part of the Athenian aristocracy before the mid-first century BC, who rose to prominence during the Roman civil war and whose descendants remained prominent in the Roman Imperial period.

The first attestation of Antipater is a decree which honours him for his service as hoplite general around the year 28 BC (Agora XV 284). A statue base (SEG 29.170) and a decree (Agora XV 290) commemorate his third term as hoplite general in the archonship of Apolexis. The date of this archonship disputed. Sean Byrne puts it in 24/3 BC, Geoffrey Schmaltz in 20/19 BC. Around this time he appears as the proposer of a decree (Agora XVI 336) which established new divine honours for Augustus, notably a festival celebrating his birthday. Another decree (Agora XV 293) commemorates Antipater's fifth term as hoplite general in the archonship of Demeas of Azenia (Byrne: ca. 20 BC, Schmalz: 18/17 BC). Two statue bases commemorate his seventh term as hoplite general. One was erected by a Roman called Proculus (IG II^{2} 3539) and the other by a group who identify themselves as "merchants" (SEG 17.71). Byrne places this term around 16 BC and Schmalz ca. 15 BC. He is probably also the honorand of a statue base at Delphi for "Antipater son of Antipater the Athenian" (SEG 18.223), erected in the 20s BC. He was one of the three leading figures in Athens in the Augustan period, alongside Pammenes of Marathon and Eucles of Marathon.

Antipater was granted Roman citizenship by Marcus Vipsanius Agrippa, making him the first Athenian to receive this honour. This citizenship grant is known from the fact that several of his descendants bear the nomen Vipsanius and from a tombstone for three of his shipwrecked slaves who are named as "Rufio, Philemation, and Ma, Vipsani of Antipater". He seems never to have used the name Vipsanius himself. The date of the grant is likely to have been Agrippa's visit to Athens in 16 BC, during which work was begun on the Odeon of Agrippa. As the leading figure of Athens at the time, Antipater was probably responsible for hosting him and negotiating the construction of the building.

== Family and descendants ==
Antipater's son, Aeolion, was archon AD 5-14 and another son, called Antipater served as archon of Athens sometime in the 20s AD. His grandson, also called Antipater, was archon in AD 45/6, and his great-grandson, Aeolion, was an ephebe in the mid-40s AD and archon around AD 75. Another descendant, Laelianus, who is the first member of the family to use the nomen Vipsanius, was an ephebe around AD 60 and funded festival games on Salamis around AD 92. Laelianus' son, Aeolion served as an exegete of the Eleusinian Mysteries and was honoured as a benefactor on Samos around AD 120. His daughter Vipsania Laeliana erected in a statue commemorating her son Titus Vipsanius Flavianus' "initiation from the hearth" around AD 120. The last attested descendants are Vipsanius Aeolion and Vipsanius Anteros who served on the Boule in AD 156/7 or 157/8.

== Bibliography ==
- Byrne, Sean G. (2003). Roman citizens of Athens. Leuven: Peeters. pp. 485–486. ISBN 9042913487.
- Geagan, Daniel J. (1979). "The Third Hoplite Generalship of Antipatros of Phlya". The American Journal of Philology. 100 (1): 59–68. doi:10.2307/294225. ISSN 0002-9475. JSTOR 294225.
- Geagan, Daniel J. (1997). Hoff, Michael C.; Rotroff, Susan I. (eds.). The Romanization of Athens : proceedings of an international conference held at Lincoln, Nebraska (April 1996). Oxford, England: Oxbow Books. pp. 19–32. ISBN 978-1-900188-51-7.
- Schmalz, Geoffrey C. R. (1996). "Athens, Augustus, and the Settlement of 21 B.C." Greek, Roman, and Byzantine Studies. 37 (4): 381–398. ISSN 2159-3159.
- Schmalz, Geoffrey C. R. (2009). Augustan and Julio-Claudian Athens : a new epigraphy and prosopography. Leiden: Brill. ISBN 978-90-04-17009-4.
