= Greece in the Roman era =

- Period: Ancient Greece
- Dates: c. 146/30 BC–4th/5th century AD
- Preceded by: Hellenistic Greece; Hellenistic period
- Followed by: Byzantine Greece; Byzantine empire

Greece in the Roman era (Greek: Έλλάς, Latin: Graecia) refers to the period of ancient Greece (roughly the territory of the modern nation-state of Greece) as well as that of the Greek people and the areas they inhabited and ruled historically, from the Roman Republic's conquest of mainland Greece in 146 BC until the division of the Roman Empire in late antiquity. It covers the periods when Greece was dominated first by the Roman Republic and then by the Roman Empire.

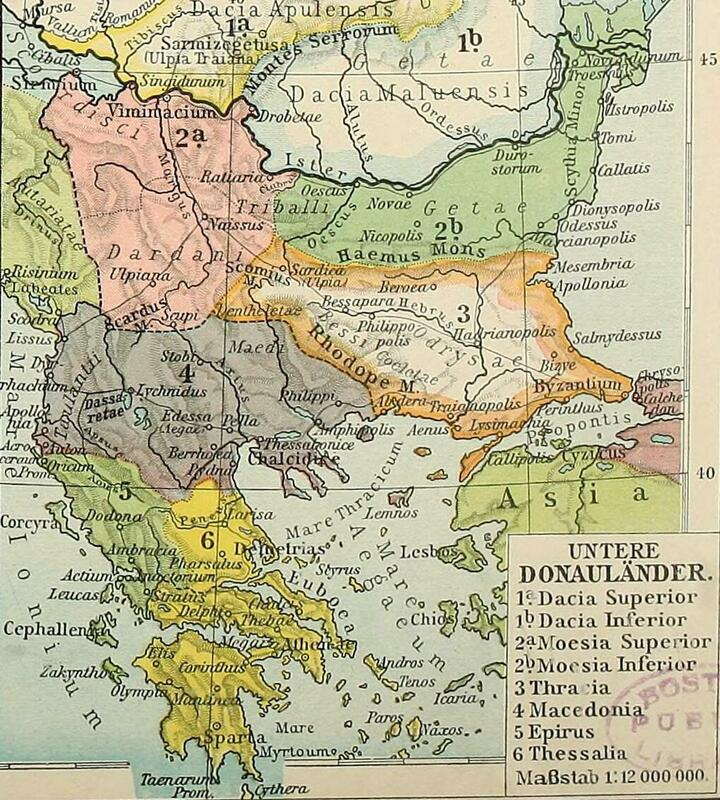
The provincial subdivision of Roman Greece

The Roman Republic had been steadily gaining control of mainland Greece in the Macedonian Wars with the Fourth Macedonian War ending in 148 BC with the final defeat of Macedonia. Two years later the Roman era began with the Corinthian defeat in the Battle of Corinth in 146 BC.

The Roman era of Greek history continued with Emperor Constantine the Great's adoption of Byzantium as Nova Roma, the capital city of the Roman Empire; in 330 AD, the city was renamed Constantinople. After the death of Theodosius I in 395 AD, the Roman Empire split into the Western and the Eastern Roman Empire (known historiographically as the Byzantine Empire), the latter of which had a thriving Greco-Roman culture.

== Roman conquest of Greece ==
The Roman conquest of Ancient Greece in the 2nd century BC

Rome came into contact with Greek political culture first in Magna Graecia, the Greek colonies in Southern Italy and Sicily and following Rome's victory in the Pyrrhic War in 275 BC, most of the cities of southern Italy came under Rome's indirect control.

The Roman Republic had been steadily gaining control of mainland Greece by repeatedly defeating the Kingdom of Macedon in a series of conflicts known as the Macedonian Wars. In the Second Macedonian War the Achaean League allied with Rome against Macedonia in 197 BC. Macedonia came under full Roman control when its king Perseus was defeated in the Third Macedonian War by the Roman Aemilius Paullus at Pydna in 168 BC, with the Romans initially dividing the region into four smaller republics.

The republics collapsed when a Macedonian royal pretender, Andriscus, took power and the Fourth Macedonian War commenced, which ended at the Battle of Pydna in 148 BC with a Roman victory, which Rome used to make Macedonia a Roman province with a permanent Roman garrison. The Greek peninsula fell to the Roman Republic after the Fall of Corinth. Meanwhile, southern Greece also came under Roman hegemony.

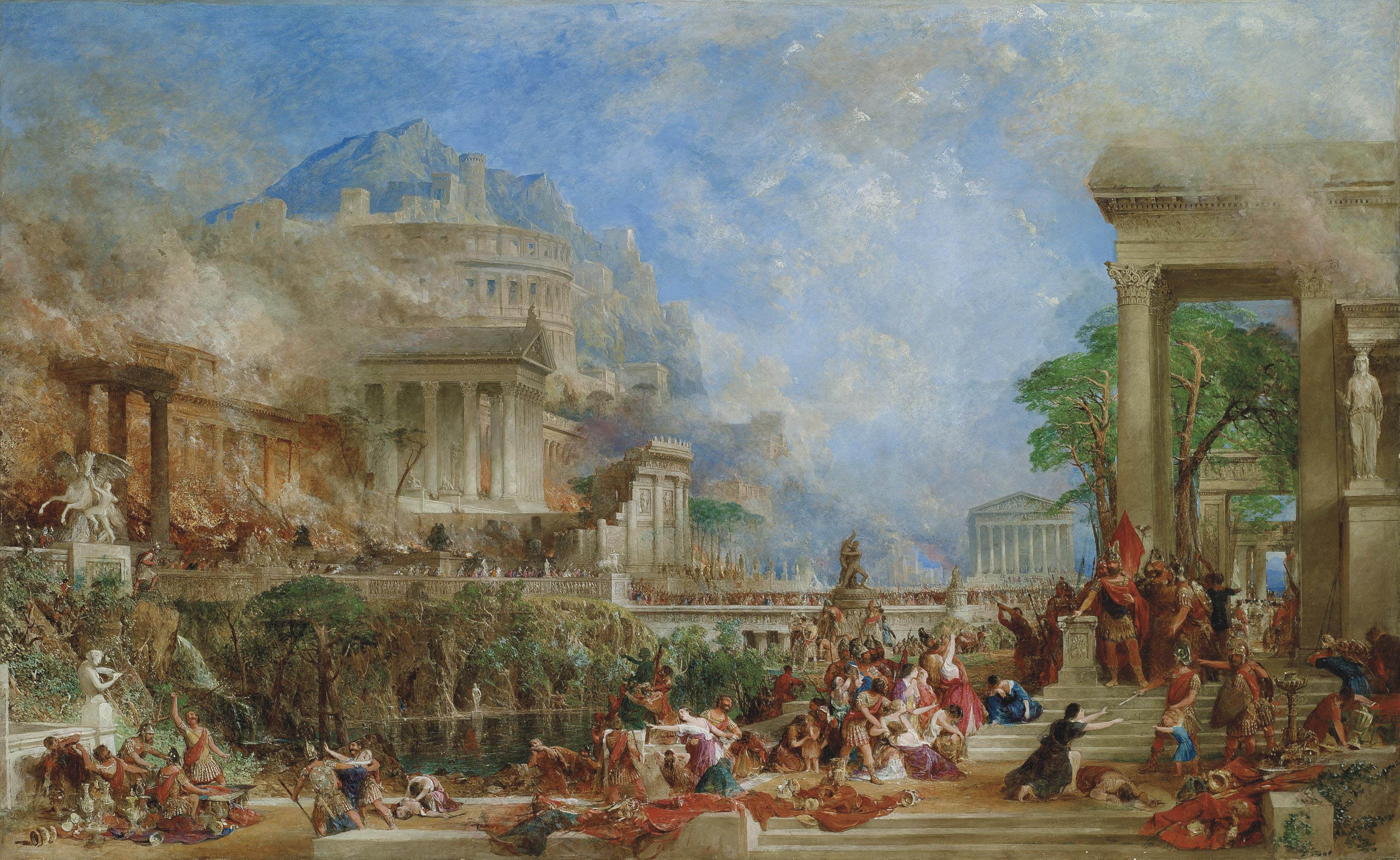
The Sack of Corinth by Thomas Allom, ca. 1870.

== Roman Republic ==
After the Achaean League collapsed a commission of the Roman Senate reorganized Greece as a Roman dependency although scholars disagree on whether or not Achaia was formally incorporated into the province of Macedonia following this defeat, but intermittent interventions in Achaian affairs by the governors are attested. Some key Greek poleis such as Athens and Sparta remained as free cities, which were partly autonomous and avoided direct Roman taxation, and other cities enjoyed local self-government. Rome did transfer government from more democratic parties to more propertied classes, who had an interest in links with Rome. Rome insisted on dissolving the leagues between cities and restricted direct trade between the Greek cities.

Little land was confiscated, although there was a land tax. There were disputes about property rights after the Roman invasion, although the historian Polybius was charged by the Roman Senate with mediating many of them. But Greece was generally such a quiet province that the Romans allowed the cities to form leagues again.

The Via Egnatia was built in the second century BC to aid the fast movement of troops between the Adriatic and the Aegean.

In 88 BC in the First Mithridatic War, Athens and other Greek city-states revolted against Rome. Part of the resentment towards Rome was due to the suppression of democracy. The revolt was suppressed by General Lucius Cornelius Sulla, although the military campaign inflicted great economic harm on Central Greece.

Piracy was an issue for the islands and coastal areas due to the lack of a strong fleet in Greek waters, and while Pompey's campaign against the pirates was successful, the fact that many of the pirates were resettled in Achaea shows the depopulation that they had brought about.

Greece largely sided with Pompey in the civil war with Julius Caesar and supplied him with his fleet. It was the scene of the decisive Battle of Pharsalus in Caesar's civil war in 48 BC that marked Caesar's defeat of Pompey and the end of the Roman Republic. In the war following the assassination of Caesar Greece largely backed the assassins. After the Second Triumvirate won the Battle of Philippi in 42 BC, Octavius and Mark Antony divided the Republic's lands with Antony taking the east, including Greece, and at times using Athens as his base. During the Roman civil wars, Greece was physically and economically devastated by the financial demands of supporting Mark Antony until Augustus organised grain supplies and the created the province of Achaea, in 27 BC.

The definitive Roman occupation of the Greek world was established after the Battle of Actium (31 BC), in which Augustus defeated Cleopatra VII, the Greek Ptolemaic queen of Egypt, and the Roman general Mark Antony, and afterwards conquered Alexandria (30 BC), the last great city of Hellenistic Egypt.

With the establishment of direct trade routes between Italy and the Levant, Greece became less prosperous. and added to the devastation caused by the military campaigns, Rome's initial conquest of Greece damaged the economy, but it readily recovered under Roman administration in the postwar period. Moreover, the Greek cities in Asia Minor recovered from the Roman conquest more rapidly than the cities of peninsular Greece, which had been much damaged in the war with Sulla.

== Early Roman Empire ==
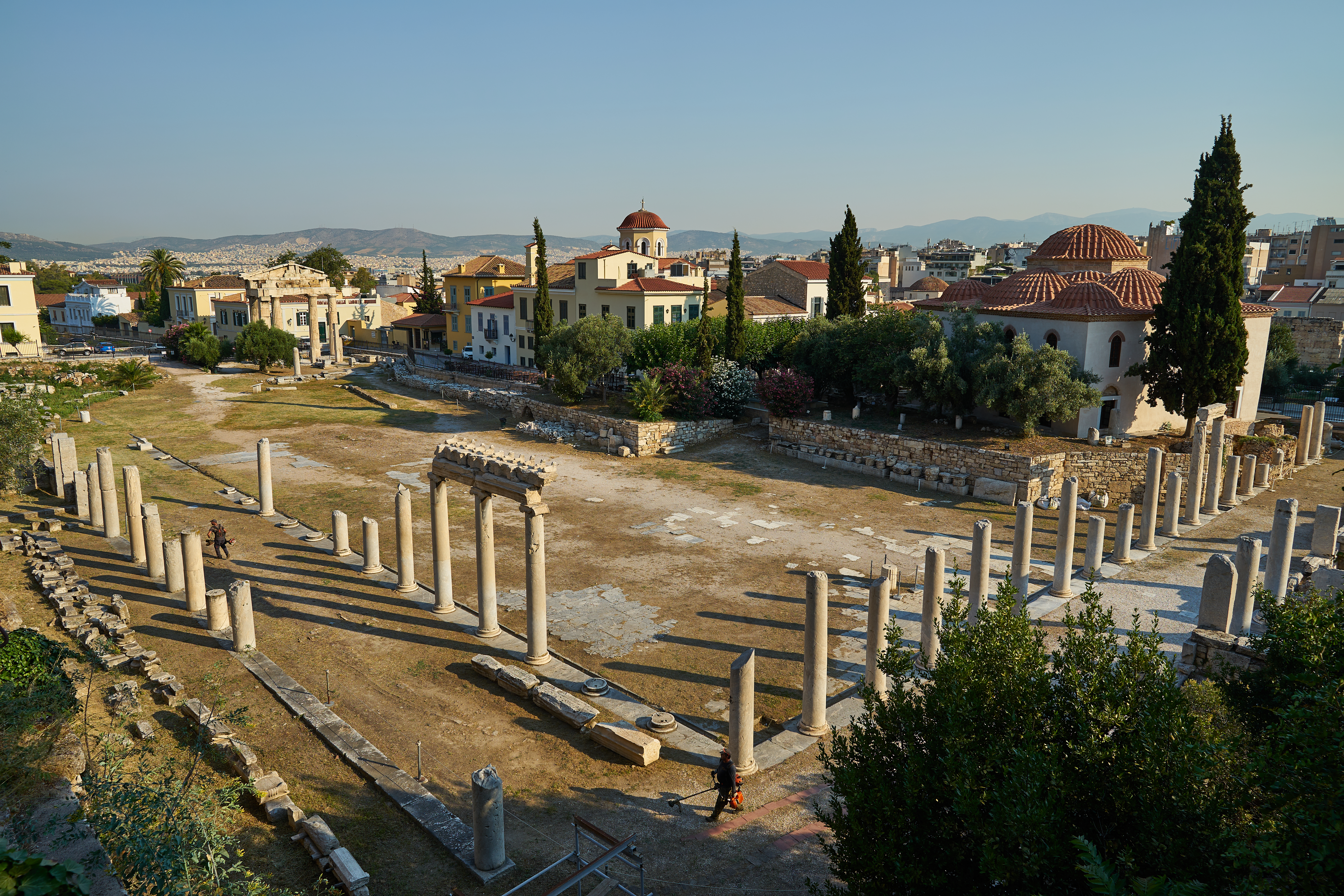
The Roman Agora of Athens

Life in Greece continued under the Roman Empire much the same as it had previously. Roman culture was highly influenced by the Greeks; as Horace said, Graecia capta ferum victorem cepit ("Captive Greece captured her rude conqueror"). Roman society even claimed to share a cultural lineage with Greece, as exemplified by Virgil's epic, the Aeneid, which details their founding myth of how the Roman people descended from the Trojan Aeneas of Homeric lore. Authors such as Seneca the Younger and Ovid wrote using Greek styles. Some Roman nobles regarded the Greeks as backwards and petty, but many others embraced Greek literature and philosophy. The Greek language became a favorite of the educated and elite in Rome, such as Scipio Africanus, who tended to study philosophy and regarded Greek culture and science as an example to be followed.

As an empire, Rome invested resources and rebuilt the cities of Roman Greece, and established Corinth as the capital city of the province of Achaea, and Athens prospered as a cultural hub of philosophy, education and knowledge.

The Roman Emperor Nero visited Greece in 66 AD, and performed at the Ancient Olympic Games, despite the rules against non-Greek participation. He was honoured with a victory in every contest, and in the following year, he proclaimed the freedom of the Greeks at the Isthmian Games in Corinth, just as Flamininus had over 200 years previously.

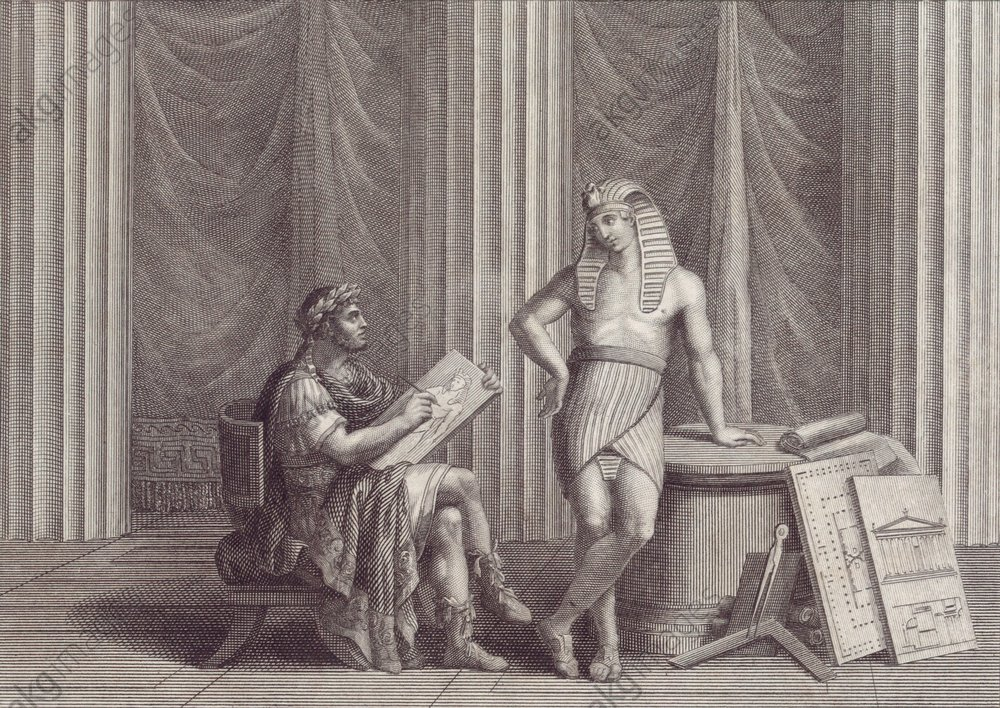
Emperor Hadrian and his Greek favorite Antinous by Bartolomeo Pinelli, ca. 1810.

Many temples and public buildings were built in Greece by emperors and wealthy Roman nobility, especially in Athens. Julius Caesar began construction of the Roman agora in Athens, which was finished by Augustus. The main gate, the Gate of Athena Archegetis, was dedicated to the patron goddess of Athens, Athena. The Agrippeia was built in the centre of the Ancient Agora of Athens by Marcus Vipsanius Agrippa. Emperor Hadrian was a philhellene who before he became emperor had served as eponymous archon of Athens. He saw himself as an heir to Pericles and made many contributions to Athens. He built the Library of Hadrian in the city and completed the construction of the Temple of Olympian Zeus, some 638 years after its construction had been started by Athenian tyrants but ended because of the belief that building on such a scale would cause hubris. The Athenians built the Arch of Hadrian to honor Emperor Hadrian.

The Pax Romana was the longest period of peace in Greek history, and Greece became a major crossroads of maritime trade between Rome and the Greek-speaking eastern half of the empire. The Greek language served as a lingua franca in the eastern provinces and in Italy, and many Greek intellectuals such as Galen would perform their work in Rome.

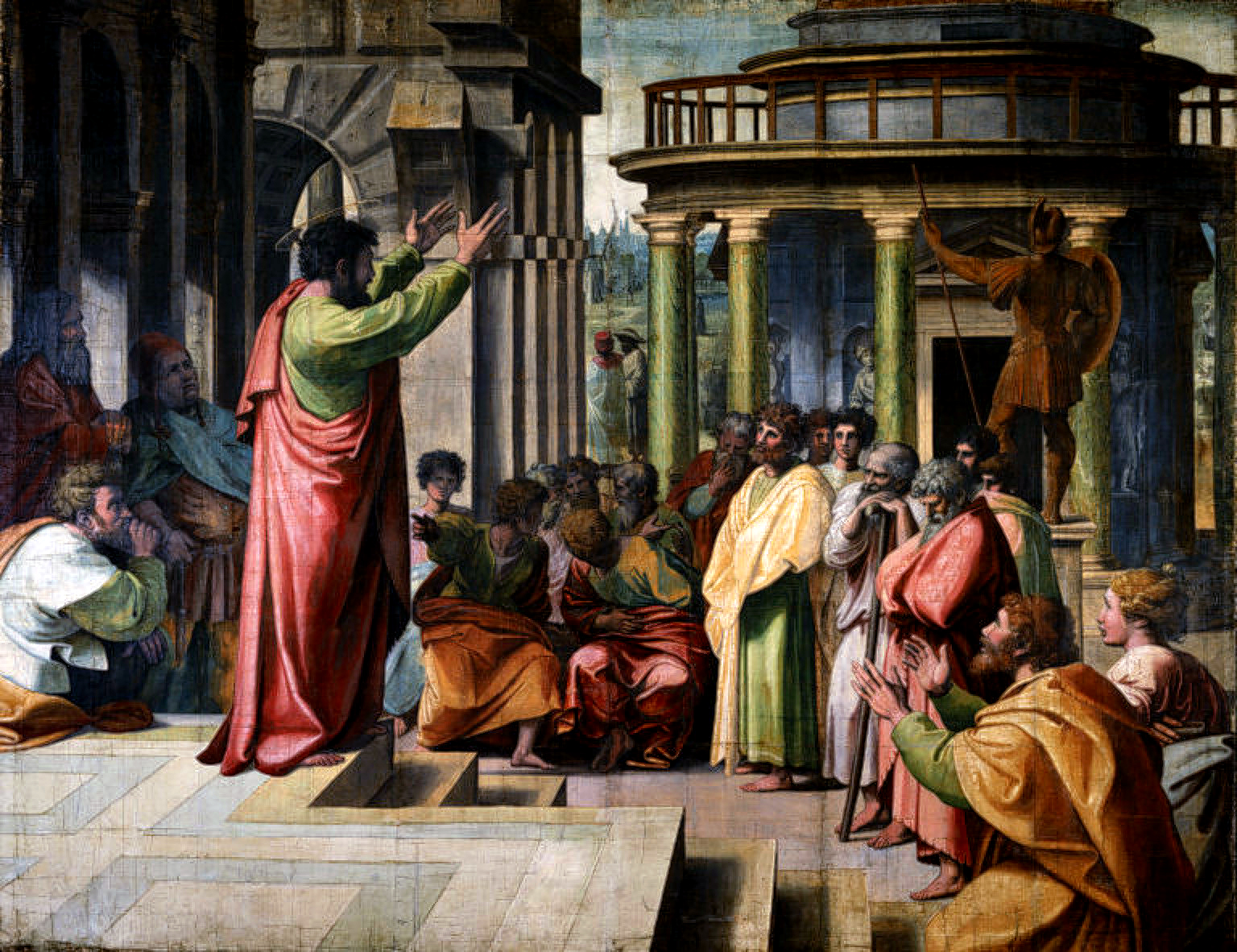
Saint Paul preaching in Athens by Raphael, ca 1515

During this time, Greece and much of the rest of the Roman east came under the influence of Early Christianity. The apostle Paul of Tarsus preached in Philippi, Corinth and Athens, and Thessalonica soon became one of the most highly Christianized areas of the empire.

== Later Roman Empire ==
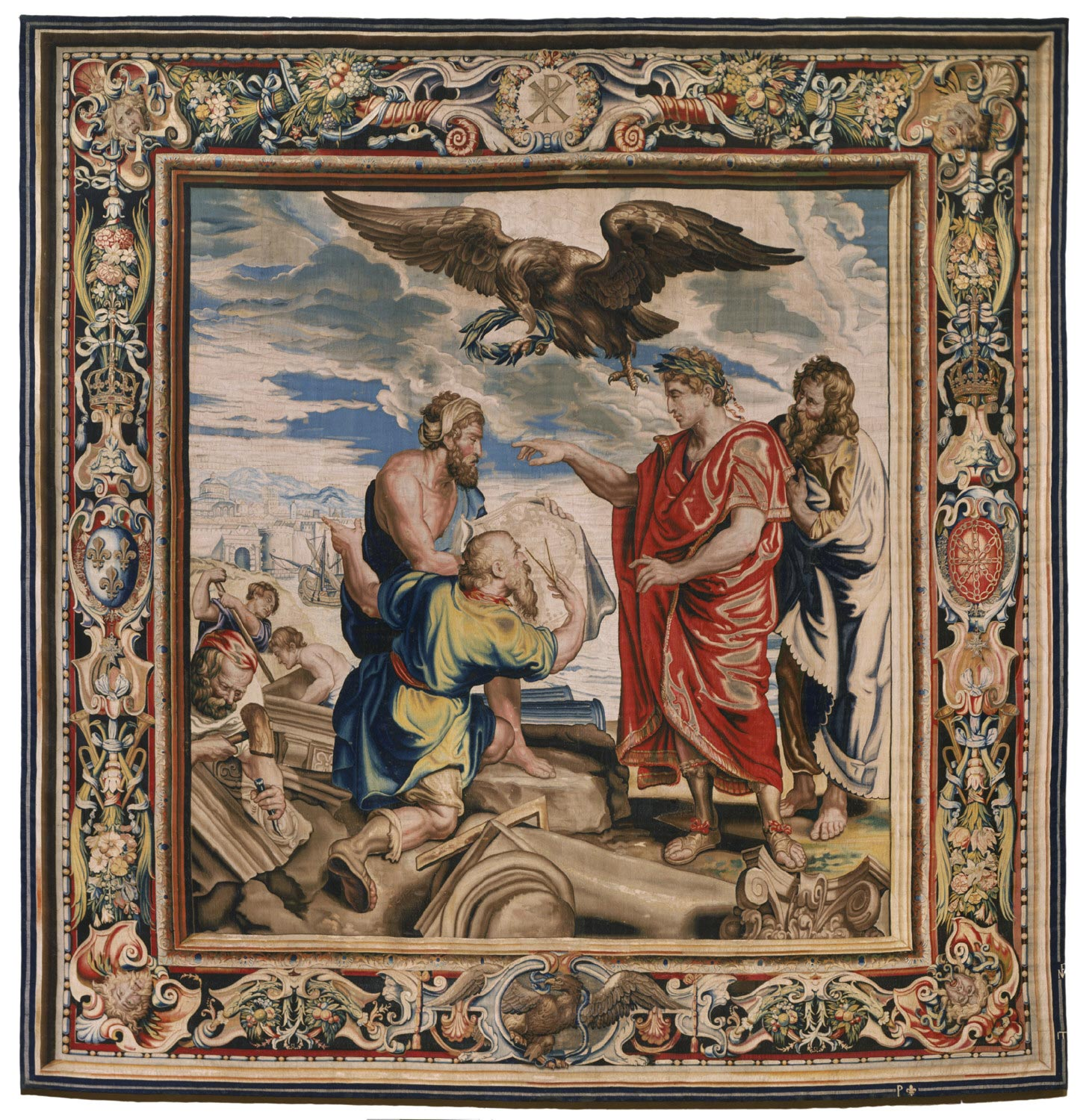
Tapestry depicting Constantine founding the city of Constantinople, ca. 1623-1625.

During the 2nd and 3rd centuries, Greece was divided into provinces including Achaea, Macedonia, Epirus and Thrace. During the reign of Diocletian in the late 3rd century, Moesia was organized as a diocese, and was ruled by Galerius. Under Constantine (who professed Christianity) Greece was part of the prefectures of Macedonia and Thrace. Theodosius divided the prefecture of Macedonia into the provinces of Creta, Achaea, Thessalia, Epirus Vetus, Epirus Nova, and Macedonia. The Aegean islands formed the province of Insulae in the Diocese of Asia.

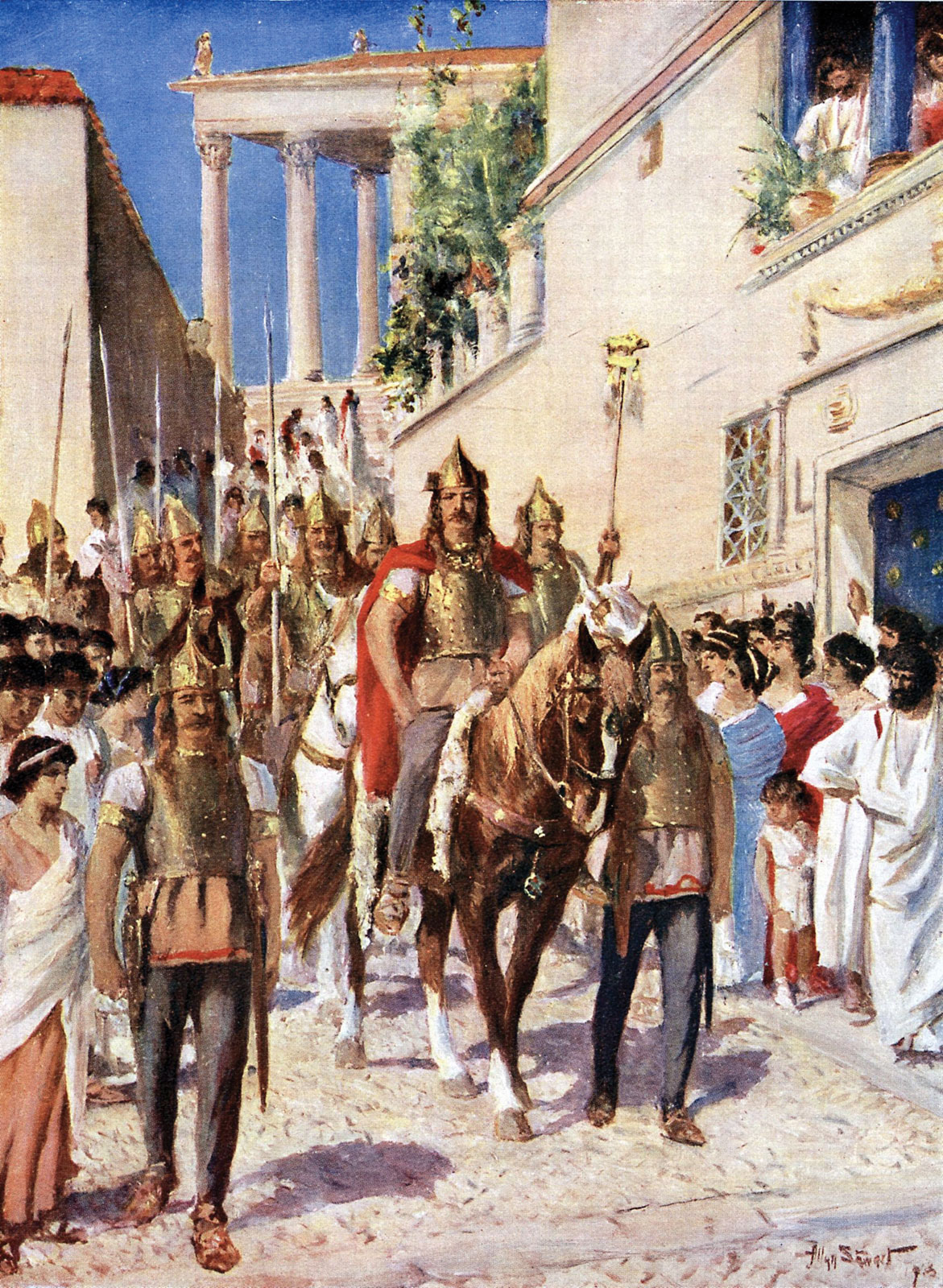
Alaric entering Athens by Allan Stewart, ca. 1915.

Greece faced invasions from the Heruli, Goths, and Vandals during the reign of Theodosius I. Stilicho, who pretended he was a regent for Arcadius, evacuated Thessaly when the Visigoths invaded in the late 4th century. Arcadius' chief advisor Eutropius allowed Alaric to enter Greece, and he looted Athens, Corinth and the Peloponnese. Stilicho eventually drove him out around 397 AD and Alaric was made magister militum in Illyricum. Eventually, Alaric and the Goths migrated to Italy, sacked Rome in 410, and built the Visigothic Kingdom in Iberia, which lasted until 711 with the advent of the Arabs.

== Aftermath ==
Greece remained part of and became the center of the remaining relatively cohesive and robust eastern half of the Roman Empire, the Eastern Roman Empire (now historiographically referred to as the Byzantine Empire), for nearly a thousand more years after the fall of the Western Roman Empire.

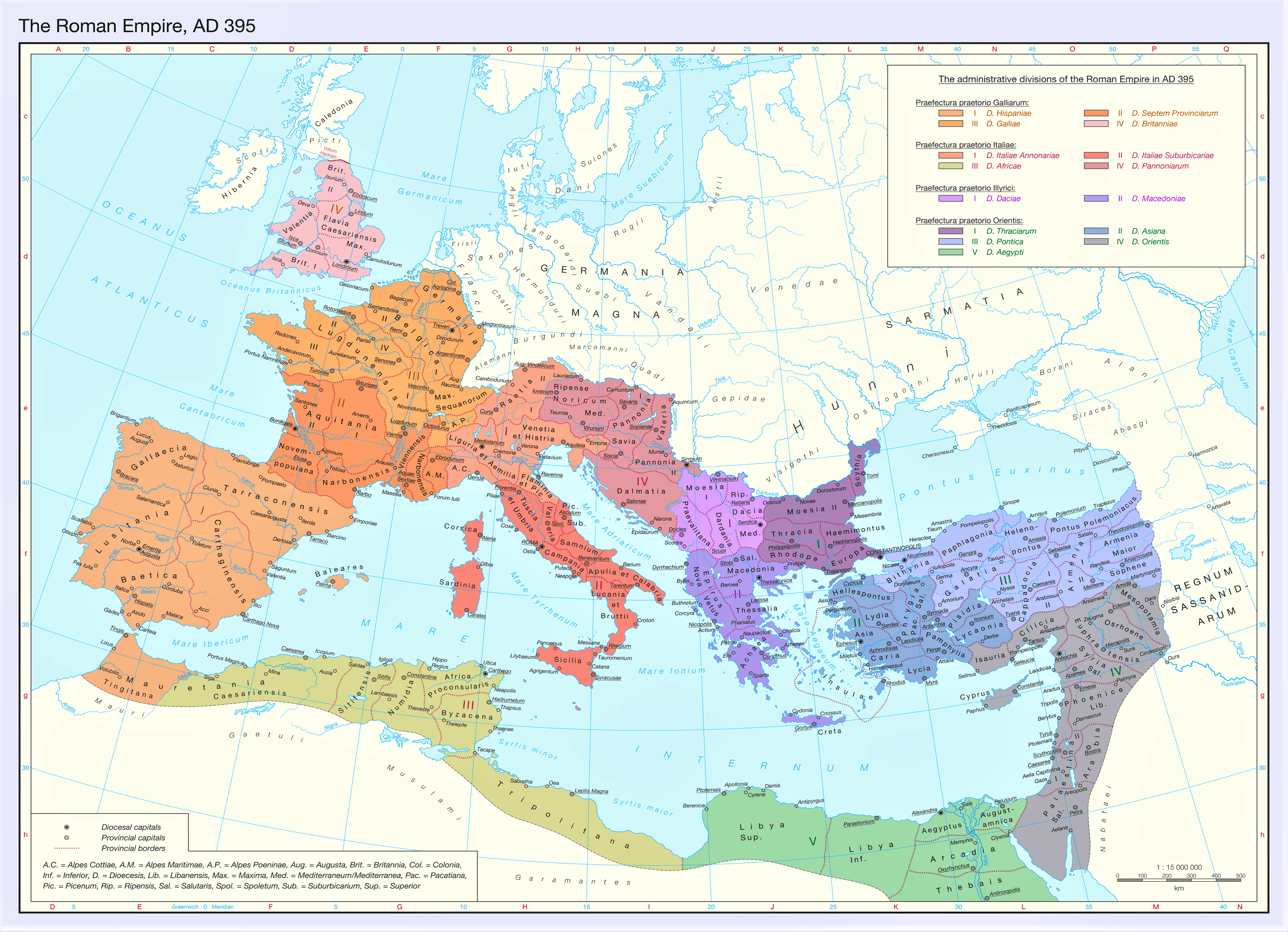
The Roman Empire in 395

Contrary to outdated visions of late antiquity, the Greek peninsula was most likely one of the most prosperous regions of the Roman Empire. Older scenarios of poverty, depopulation, barbarian destruction, and civil decay have been revised in light of recent archaeological discoveries. In fact, the polis, as an institution, appears to have remained prosperous until at least the 6th century, despite the so-called 'decline and fall' in the west. Contemporary texts such as Hierocles' Syndekmos affirm that late antique Greece was highly urbanised and contained approximately eighty cities. This view of broad prosperity is widely accepted today, and it is assumed between the 4th and 7th centuries AD, Greece continued as one of the most economically active regions in the eastern Mediterranean.

As the eastern half of the Mediterranean had always been predominantly Greek, the eastern (and thus the continuing) part of the Roman Empire gradually became Hellenized following the fall of the Latin western empire. Over the course of the following centuries, mainland Greece was mainly contested between the Roman and Bulgarian Empires, and suffered from invasions by Slavic tribes and Normans. Crete and Cyprus were contested between the Romans and Arabs and were later taken by the Crusaders who, following the Sack of Constantinople in 1204, established the Latin Empire in Greece. The Romans retook Constantinople and re-established control in most of the Greek peninsula, although Epirus would remain an independent splinter state until the early 14th century when Roman control was re-established. As civil strife continued to beset the late-Byzantine empire, the Serbian Empire took the opportunity to conquer most of mainland Greece, while a resurgent Bulgarian Empire invaded from the north. In the century that followed, the Ottoman Empire would establish its dominance in the region, annexing all three empires and finishing its conquest of Greece with the fall of the Morea in 1460. Modern Greeks see the Roman period as a negative period between the Ancient Greek period and the Eastern Roman Empire.

== Sources ==
- Bernhardt, Rainer (1977). "Der Status des 146 v. Chr. unterworfenen Teils Griechenlands bis zur Einrichtung der Provinz Achaia" [The status of the part of Greece subjugated in 146 BC until the establishment of the province of Achaia]. Historia: Zeitschrift für Alte Geschichte (in German). 26 (1): 62–73. JSTOR 4435542.
- Boardman, John The Oxford History of Greece & the Hellenistic World 2nd Edition Oxford University Press, 1988. ISBN 0-19-280137-6
- Bourchier, James David (1911). "Greece" . In Chisholm, Hugh (ed.). Encyclopædia Britannica (11th ed.). Cambridge University Press.
- Ferguson, John (2013). "Hellenistic Age: The coming of Rome 225-133". Encyclopædia Britannica. Archived from the original on 20 December 2012.
- Ferguson, John (2013a). "Hellenistic Age: The Greek world under the Roman Empire". Encyclopædia Britannica. Archived from the original on 20 December 2012.
- Francis, Jane E. and Anna Kouremenos Roman Crete: New Perspectives. Oxford: Oxbow, 2016. ISBN 978-1-78570-095-8
- Kouremenos, Anna (April 2019). "PΩΜΑΙΟΚΡΑΤΙΑ ≠ Roman Occupation: (Mis)perceptions of the Roman Period in Greece". Greece & Rome. Second Series. 66 (1). Cambridge University Press: 37–60. JSTOR 26782314.
- Holland, Tom (2004). Rubicon: The Triumph and Tragedy of the Roman Republic. London: Abacus. ISBN 0-349-11563-X.
- Kouremenos, Anna The Province of Achaea in the 2nd Century CE: The Past Present. London and New York: Routledge, 2022. ISBN 1032014857
- Lane Fox, Robin (2005). The Classical World. Penguin Books. ISBN 0-14-102141-1.
- Nigdelis, Pandelis (2007). "III. Roman Macedonia (168 BC - AD 284)". History of Macedonia (PDF). Museum for the Macedonian Struggle (Thessaloniki).
- Papazoglou, F. (1979). "Quelques aspects de l'histoire de la province de Macédoine". ANRW. ii.7.1: 302–369.
- Rothaus, Richard M. Corinth: The First City of Greece. Brill, 2000. ISBN 90-04-10922-6
- Ursin, Frank (2019). Freiheit, Herrschaft, Widerstand. Griechische Erinnerungskultur in der Hohen Kaiserzeit (1.-3. Jahrhundert n. Chr.) [Freedom, rule, resistance. The Greek culture of remembrance in the High Imperial Period (1st-3rd century AD)]. Stuttgart: Steiner. ISBN 978-3-515-12163-7.
- Vanderspoel, John (2010). "Provincia Macedonia". In Roisman, Joseph; Worthington, Ian (eds.). A companion to ancient Macedonia. Chichester, West Sussex, U.K.: Blackwell Publishing. pp. 251–275. ISBN 978-1-405-17936-2.
