= Tiberius Claudius Atticus Herodes (consul 133) =

Late 1st/early 2nd century Greco-Roman senator and consul

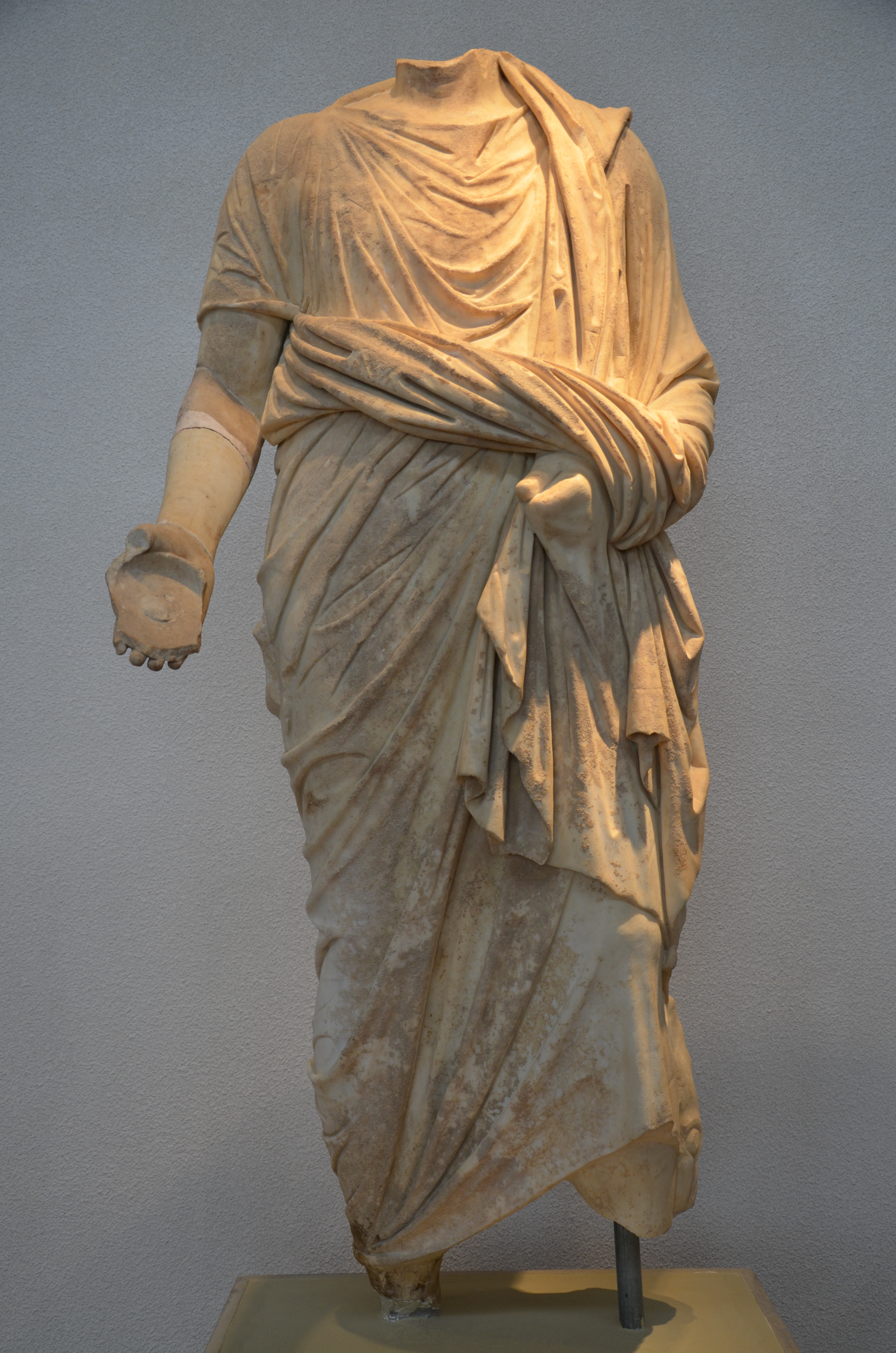
- Statue of Tiberius Claudius Atticus, from the Nymphaeum erected by his son Herodes Atticus at Olympia, between 149 and 153 AD, Olympia Archaeological Museum, Greece.

Legate of Iudaea
- In office 98–101
- Preceded by: Sextus Hermentidius Campanus
- Succeeded by: Gaius Julius Quadratus Bassus

Personal details
- Born: c. 65 Roman Empire
- Died: c. 137
- Occupation: Ancient Roman politician

Tiberius Claudius Atticus Herodes (Greek: Τιβέριος Κλαύδιος Άττικός Ήρώδης; 65 – before 160) was a Greek aristocrat of the Roman Empire. Born into a wealthy family, his father was proscribed by Domitian, had his fortune confiscated, and was exiled or executed. Claudius Atticus restored his family's influence, becoming a senator and suffect consul in 133. His son, Herodes Atticus, erected a statue of him at the Nymphaeum of Herodes Atticus in Olympia.

== Origin and life ==
Claudius Atticus was a Greek of Athenian descent. As he bears the Roman family name, Claudius, it is possible that a paternal ancestor of his received Roman citizenship from a member of the Claudius gens. Claudius Atticus was born and raised into a very distinguished, wealthy family, descended from the Augustan-era politician, Eucles of Marathon. He was the son of Tiberius Claudius Hipparchus (born c. 40); his mother's name is unknown. His sister, Claudia Alcia, married the Athenian aristocrat Lucius Vibullius Rufus.

Claudius Atticus' father, Hipparchus, was considered one of the wealthiest men in the Roman Empire; he was reputed to possess one hundred million sesterces. This reputation is evident in a line from Suetonius (The Twelve Caesars, Vespasian, 13):

When Salvius Liberalis was defending a rich client he earned commendation from Vespasian by daring to ask: ‘Does the Emperor really care whether Hipparchus is, or is not, worth a million gold pieces?’

However, Hipparchus' fortune ultimately led to his downfall. Vespasian's second son Domitian, in either 92 or 93, ordered proscriptions on a large number of wealthy men. The father of Claudius Atticus seems to have been accused of attempting to form an extra-constitutional regime in Athens. Consequently, his fortune and estates were confiscated, and, on Domitian's orders, Hipparchus was either executed or exiled.

In later years, in a house that Claudius Atticus acquired near the Theatre of Dionysus in Athens, he found an immense treasure. As a precaution, he wrote a letter to the Emperor Nerva informing him of this and asking what to do with the treasure. Nerva replied in a letter stating: "Use what you have found". However, Claudius Atticus again wrote to Nerva, stating that this discovery was beyond his station in life, to which Nerva replied: "Then misuse your windfall, for it is yours". It is possible that this treasure was hidden there by Hipparchus during Domitian's proscriptions. With it, Claudius Atticus restored his family's influence and prestige.

In 98, using money from the treasure, Claudius Atticus purchased a seat in the Roman Senate. According to two fragments from the Christian chronicler Hegesippus, Claudius Atticus served as the 7th legate of Iudaea Province from 99 to 102. He was one of the suffect consuls in 133, the first Greek from old Greece to reach the post, and probably also its first member in the Roman Senate.

== Family ==
Claudius Atticus married an Athenian heiress, Vibullia Alcia Agrippina, a member of a very wealthy and prominent family. Vibullia was also his niece, the daughter of his sister, Claudia Alcia. They had three children:

- Lucius Vibullius Hipparchus Tiberius Claudius Atticus Herodes, otherwise known as Herodes Atticus, 101-177
- Tiberius Claudius Atticus Herodianus
- Claudia Tisamenis

Herodes Atticus and his wife, Aspasia Annia Regilla, erected a great outdoor nymphaeum (a monumental fountain) at Olympia, Greece. The monumental fountain features statues and honors members of the ruling imperial family, relatives of Herodes Atticus, and his wife. Among the statues is one of Claudius Atticus, now on display at the Archaeological Museum of Olympia.

== Sources ==
- Byrne, Sean G. (2003). Roman citizens of Athens. Leuven: Peeters. ISBN 9042913487.
- Day, J., An economic history of Athens under Roman domination, Ayers Company Publishers, 1973
- Graindor, P., Un milliardaire antique, Ayers Company Publishers, 1979
- Wilson, N.G., Encyclopedia of Ancient Greece, Routledge, 2006
- Pomeroy, S.B., The murder of Regilla: a case of domestic violence in antiquity, Harvard University Press, 2007
- "Plancia Magna, Aurelia Paulina, and Regilla: Civic Donors"
- "Procurators"

Political offices
Preceded by Quintus Flavius Tertullus, and Junius Rusticus as suffect consuls	Suffect consul of the Roman Empire; 133 with Publius Sufenas Verus	Succeeded by Lucius Julius Ursus Servianus III, and Titus Vibius Varus as ordinary consuls
