= Gate of Athena Archegetis =

Coordinates: 37.9746°N 23.7255°E

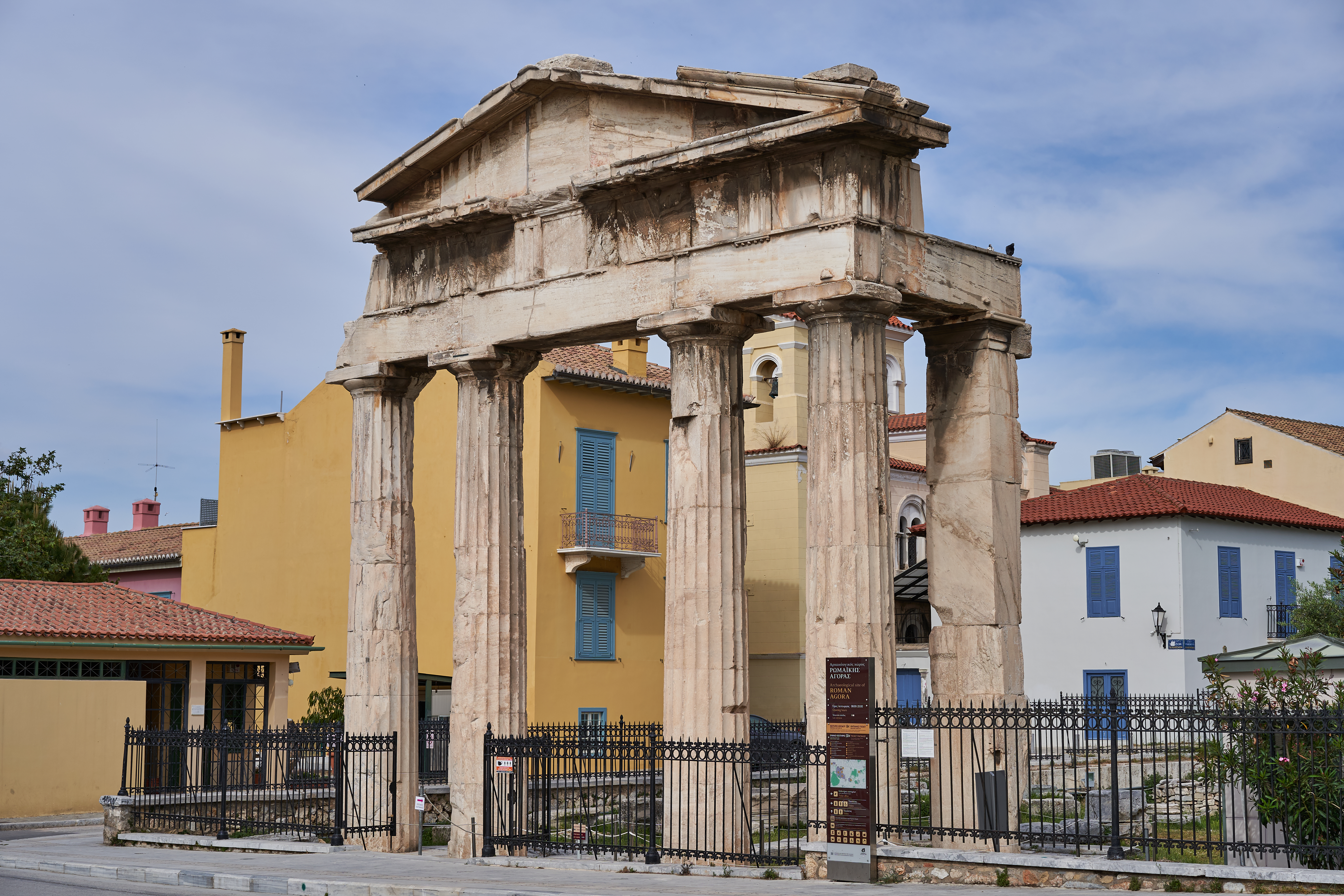
View of gate of Athena Archegetis

The Gate of Athena Archegetis is situated west side of the Roman Agora, in Athens and considered to be the second most prominent ancient building there after the Tower of the Winds.

Constructed in 11 BCE by donations from Julius Caesar and Augustus, the gate was made of an architrave standing on four Doric columns and a base, all of Pentelic marble. A dedicatory inscription offers an insight into the time and circumstances of the monument's construction:

O ΔΗΜOΣ ΑΠO ΤΩΝ ΔOΘΕΙΣΩΝ ΔΩΡΕΩΝ ΥΠO ΓΑΙOΥ ΙOΥΛΙOΥ ΚΑΙΣΑΡOΣ ΘΕOΥ/ ΚΑΙ ΑΥΤOΚΡΑΤOΡOΣ ΘΕOΥ ΥΙOΥ ΣΕΒΑΣΤOΥ/ ΑΘΗΝΑ ΑΡΧΗΓΕΤΙΔΙ ΣΤΡΑΤΗΓOΥΝΤOΣ ΕΠΙ ΤOΥΣ OΠΛΙΤΑΣ ΕΥΚΛΕOΥΣ ΜΑΡΑΘΩΝΙOΥ/ ΤOΥ ΚΑΙ ΔΙΑΔΕΞΑΜΕΝOΥ ΤΗΝ ΕΠΙΜΕΛΕΙΑΝ ΥΠΕΡ ΤOΥ ΠΑΤΡOΣ ΗΡΩΔOΥ ΤOΥ ΚΑΙ ΠΡΕΣΒΕΥΣΑΝΤOΣ/ ΕΠΙ ΑΡΧOΝΤOΣ ΝΙΚΙOΥ ΤOΥ ΣΑΡΑΠΙΩΝOΣ ΑΘΜOΝΕΩΣ (IG II3 4 12)

(The People of Athens from the donations offered by Gaius Julius Caesar the God and the Reverend Emperor son of God To Athena Archegetis, on behalf of the soldiers of Eukles from Marathon, who curated it on behalf of his father Herod and who was also an ambassador under the archon Nicias, son of Sarapion, from the demos of Athmonon) It was a monument dedicated by the Athenians to their patroness Athena Archegetis.

== Gallery ==
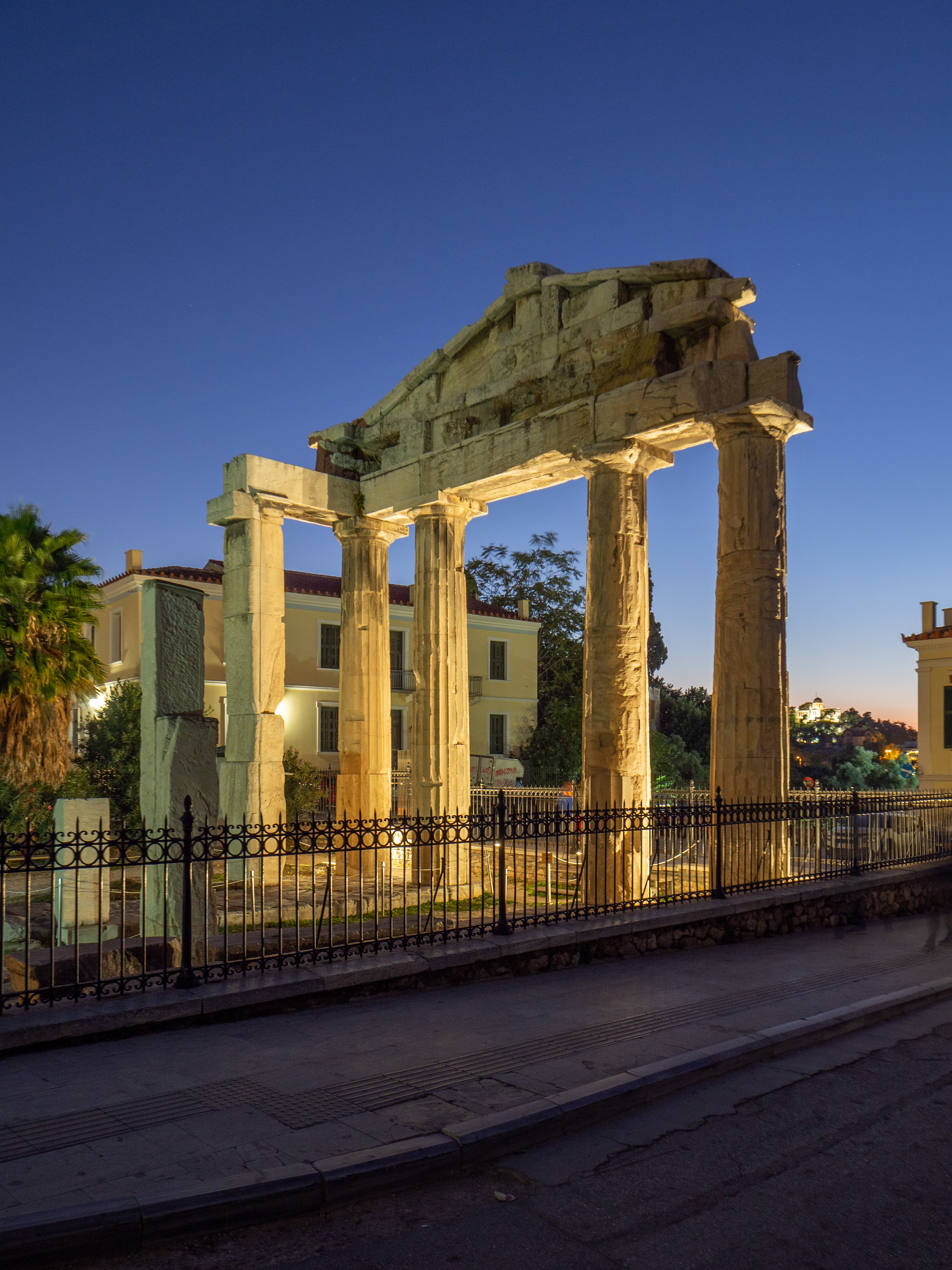
Side view of the gate

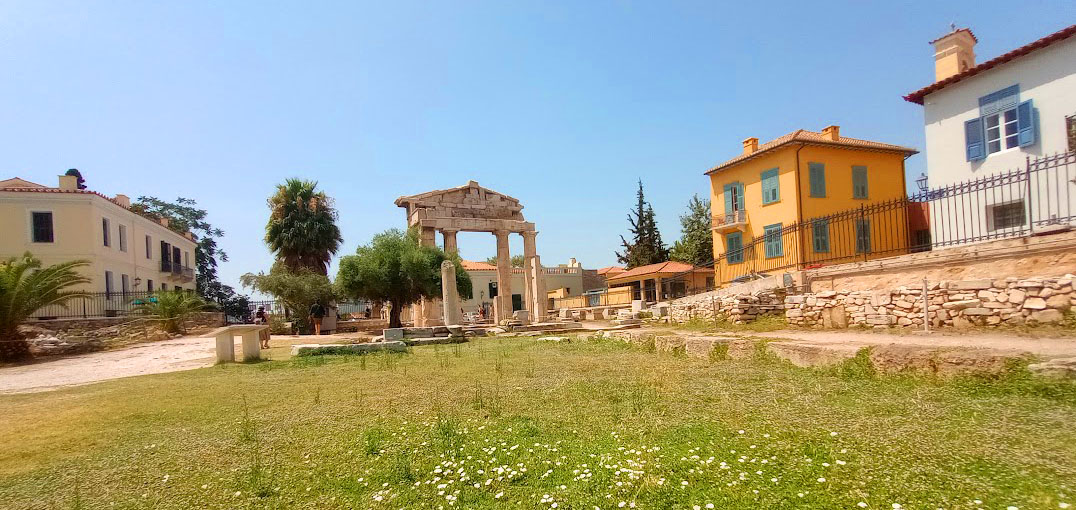
General view of the gate and surroundings in the Roman Agora

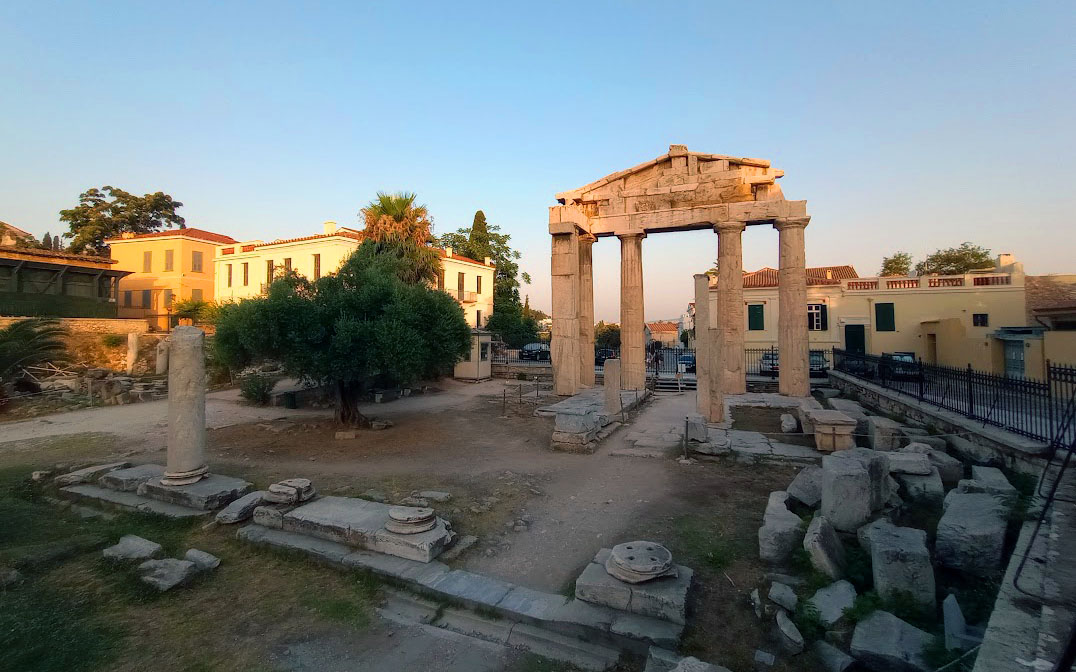
Morning view

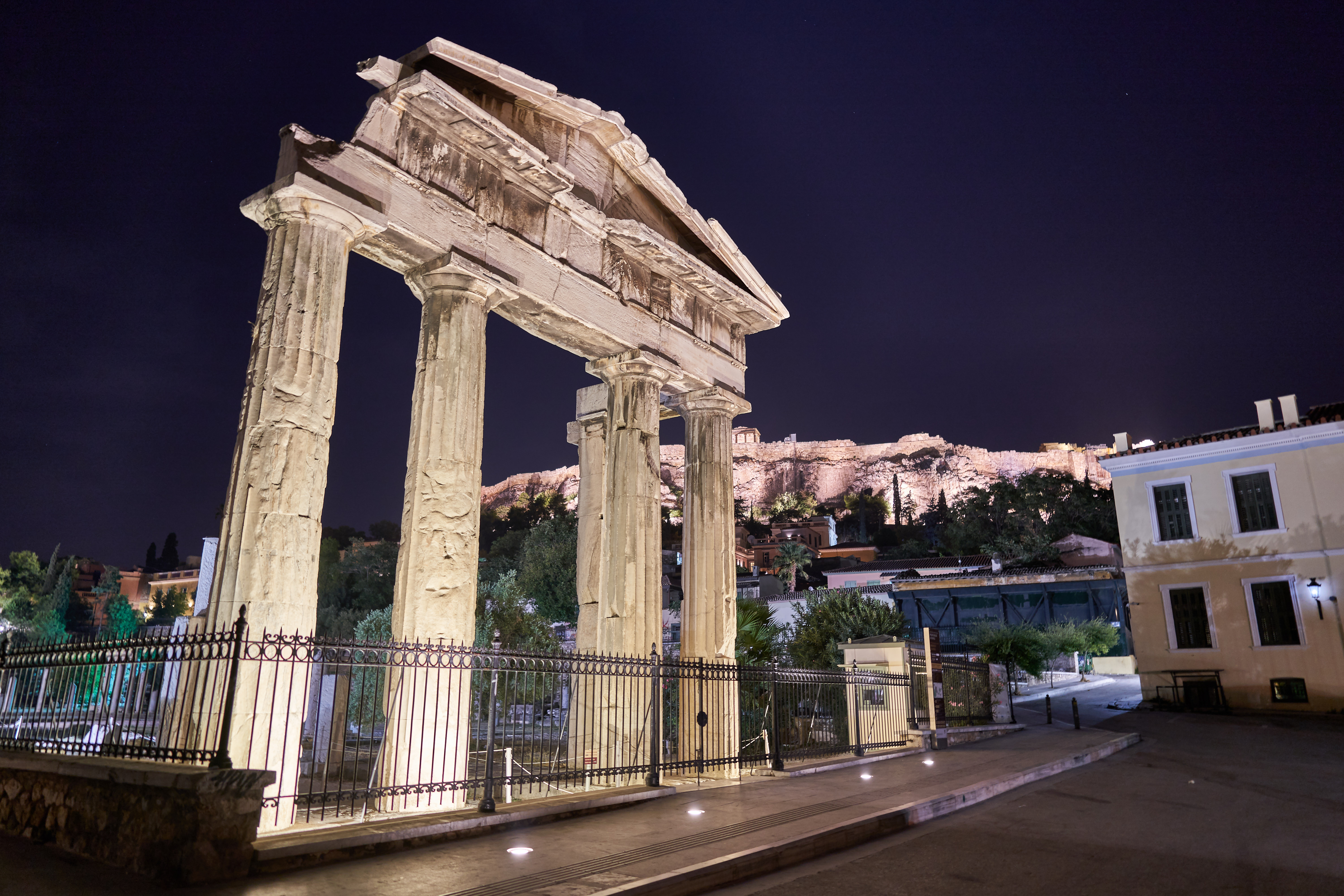
Night view
