= Aristocles =

Aristocles may refer to:

- Plato, Greek philosopher whose given name was apocryphally stated to be Aristocles in some ancient sources
- Aristocles of Rhodes (fl. 1st century BCE), grammarian, rhetorician and Platonist
- Aristocles of Pergamon (fl. 1st century), rhetorician
- Aristocles (physician) (fl. 1st century) physician of Ancient Greece
- Aristocles of Messene (fl. 2nd century), Peripatetic philosopher
- Aristocles Of Lampsacus, stoic philosopher.
- Aristocles, a Stoic philosopher, who wrote a commentary in four books on a work of Chrysippus some time after the 3rd century
- Aristocles, a musician to whom Athenaeus attributes a worked titled "On Song" (Ancient Greek: περὶ χόρων)
- Aristocles, the otherwise unknown author of a solitary epigram in the Greek Anthology
- Aristocles, author of a work on paradoxes (Ancient Greek: Παράδοξα). Some scholars believe this person is identical with Aristocles of Messene.
- Aristocles (sculptors)
