= Panagia Marmariotissa, Chalandri =

Panagia Marmariotissa
- Παναγία Μαρμαριώτισσα
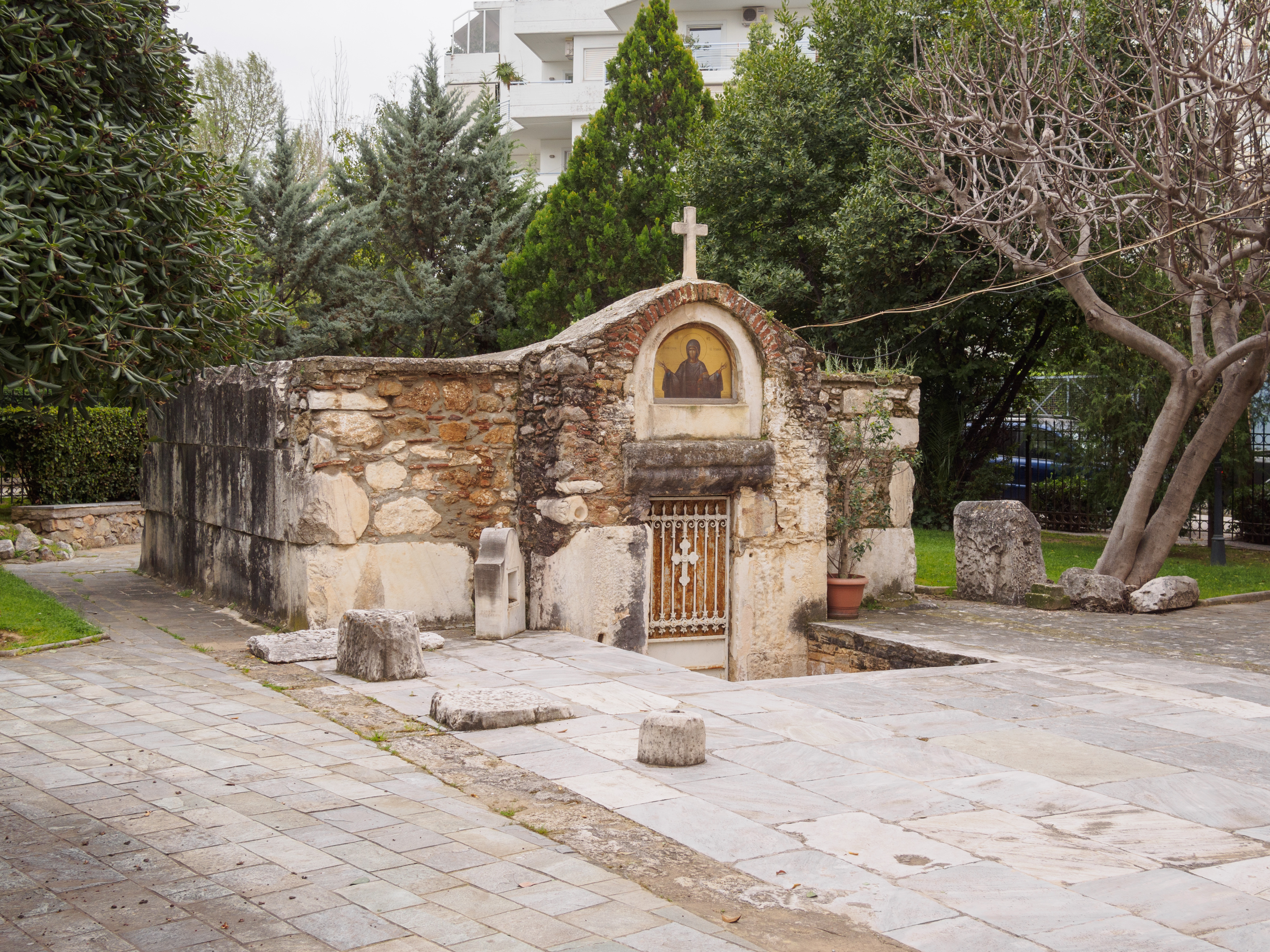

- 38°0′56″N 23°47′54″E
- Location: Chalandri, Attica
- Country: Greece
- Language: Greek
- Denomination: Greek Orthodox

History
- Status: Open

Architecture
- Completed: 1717

The Panagia Marmariotissa (Greek: Παναγία Μαρμαριώτισσα) is a church located in Chalandri. The temple was originally a funerary monument from Roman times but was later converted into a church. Today it is located at the junction of Panagia Marmariotissis and Sofoklis Venizelou streets, behind the new church of the same name. The name "Marmariotissa" refers to the marble from which the monument is constructed.

The building was originally a mausoleum which was built in Roman times, in the municipality of ancient Phlya (note Chalandri). The expensive construction material indicates that it was built by a wealthy resident of the municipality. It appears to be a copy of the funerary monument of Kifissia, a now ruined mausoleum built by Herodes Atticus, and so it has been suggested that he was the builder of the monument.

It is kept in excellent condition. Its floor is a few meters below the current ground surface. In the original monument, the entrance was on the eastern side, where today the sanctuary of the small, semi-hexagonal temple is located. The entrance is now from the west. The ceiling is a semi-cylindrical vault, made of marble wedges. Inside, there are fragments of frescoes from the 17th century, and Anastasios Orlando noticed an engraving on them with the year 1717.
