= Herodes Atticus =

Greek sophist and Roman senator (101–177)

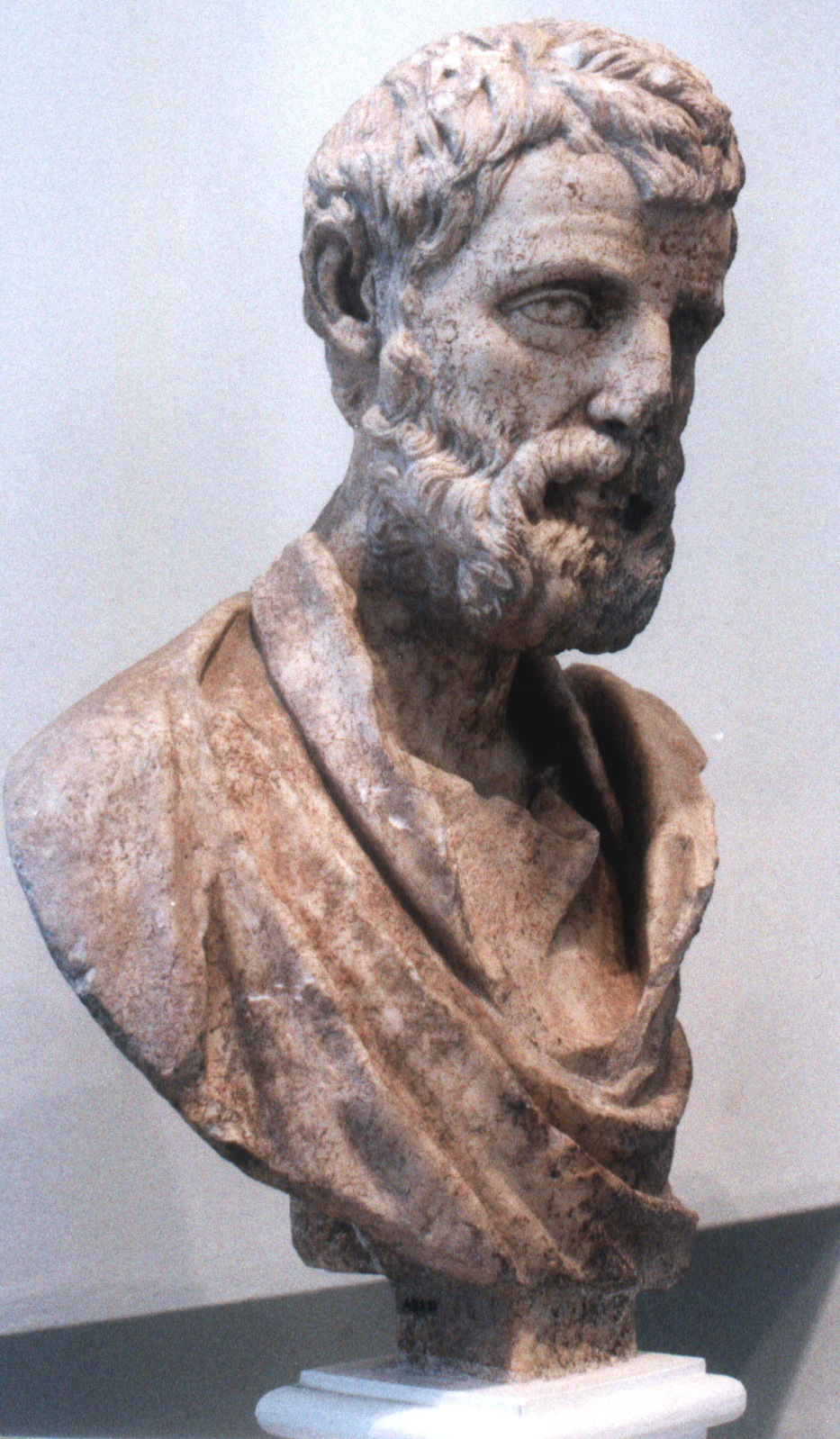
- Herodes Atticus bust, from his villa at Kephissia. mid-2nd century
- Born: Lucius Vibullius Hipparchus Tiberius Claudius Atticus Herodes; 101; Marathon, Greece
- Died: 177 (aged 75–76); Marathon, Greece
- Occupations: Imperial magistrate, engineering and architectural consultant
- Employer(s): Senate and people of Rome
- Organization: Imperial administration
- Criminal charges: First-degree murder of his wife
- Criminal status: Exonerated by emperor Marcus Aurelius

Herodes Atticus (Ancient Greek: Ἡρώδης; AD 101–177) was an Athenian rhetorician, as well as a Roman senator. A great philanthropic magnate, he and his wife Appia Annia Regilla, for whose murder he was potentially responsible, commissioned many Athenian public works, several of which stand to the present day. He was one of the best-known figures of the Antonine Period, and taught rhetoric to the Roman emperors Marcus Aurelius and Lucius Verus, and was advanced to the consulship in 143. His full name as a Roman citizen was Lucius Vibullius Hipparchus Tiberius Claudius Atticus Herodes.

According to Philostratus, Herodes Atticus, in possession of the best education that money could buy, was a notable proponent of the Second Sophistic. Having gone through the cursus honorum of civil posts, he demonstrated a talent for civil engineering, especially the design and construction of water-supply systems; the Nymphaeum at Olympia was therefore one of his dearest projects. His villa (or palace) in the Peloponnese also involved a major aqueduct.

However, he never lost sight of philosophy and rhetoric, becoming a teacher himself. One of his students was the young Marcus Aurelius, last of the "Five Good Emperors".

Moses Finley describes Herodes Atticus as "patron of the arts and letters (and himself a writer and scholar of importance), public benefactor on an imperial scale, not only in Athens but elsewhere in Greece and Asia Minor, holder of many important posts, friend and kinsman of emperors."

== Ancestry and family ==
Herodes Atticus was a Greek of Athenian descent. His ancestry could be traced to the Athenian noblewoman Elpinice, a half-sister of the statesman Cimon and daughter of Miltiades. He claimed lineage from a series of mythic Greek kings: Theseus, Cecrops, and Aeacus, as well as the god Zeus. His father's family, known as the Claudii of Marathon, rose to prominence in the late first century BC, when his great-great-great grandfather Herodes and his great-great grandfather Eucles forged links with Julius Caesar and Augustus. The family received Roman citizenship from Emperor Claudius, receiving the nomen Claudius. They were exceptionally wealthy.

Herodes' father, Tiberius Claudius Atticus Herodes entered the Roman Senate and became Roman consul, the first Athenian to do so. His mother was the wealthy heiress Vibullia Alcia Agrippina. He had a brother named Tiberius Claudius Atticus Herodianus and a sister named Claudia Tisamenis. His maternal grandparents were Claudia Alcia and Lucius Vibullius Rufus, while his paternal grandfather was Hipparchus.

His parents were related as uncle and niece. His maternal grandmother and his father were sister and brother. His maternal uncle Lucius Vibullius Hipparchus was an Archon of Athens in the years 99–100 and his maternal cousin, Publius Aelius Vibullius Rufus, was an Archon of Athens between 143–144.

== Life ==
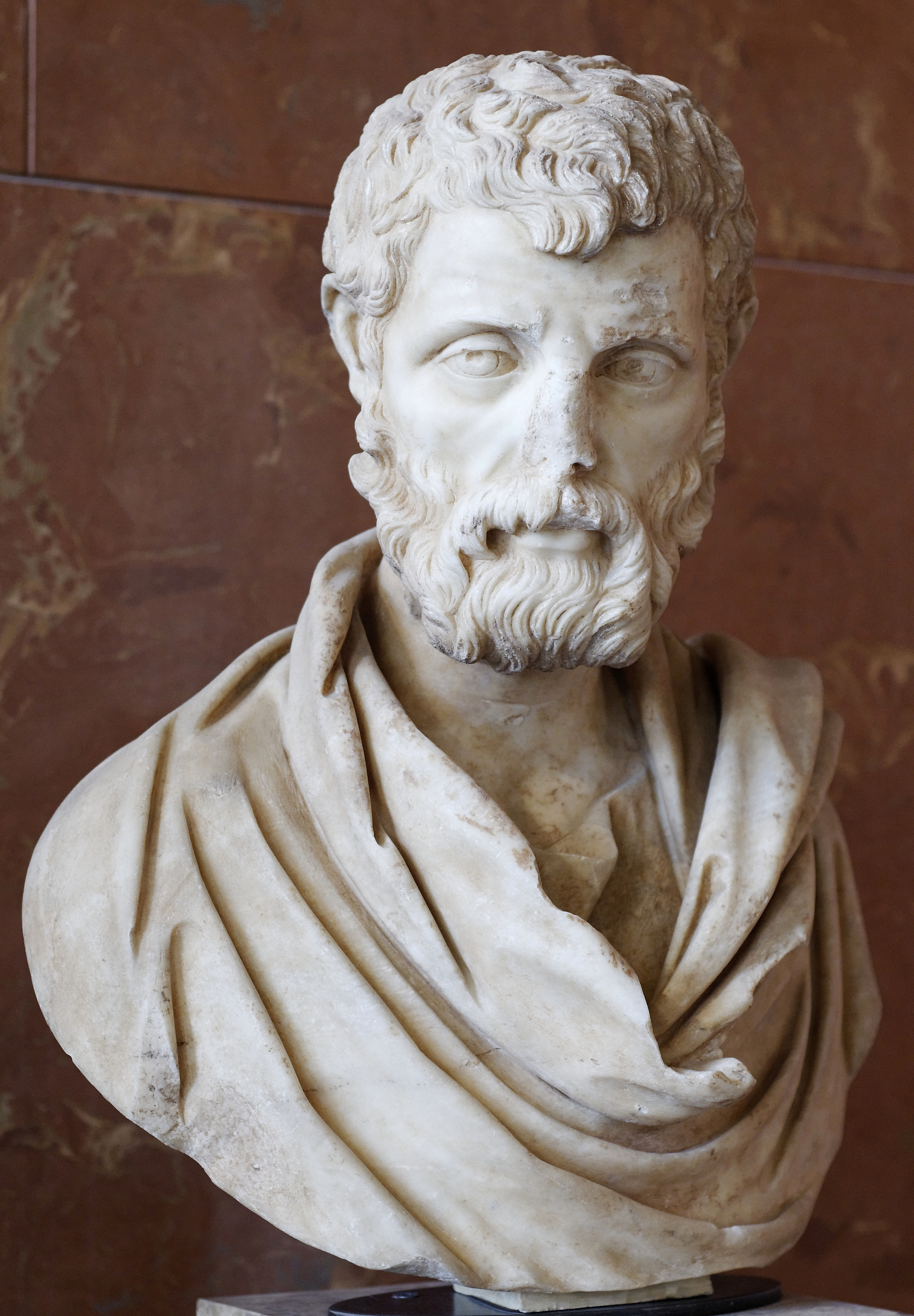
Herodes Atticus. Marble, ca. 161 AD. Found in Probalinthos, Attica— Louvre, Paris

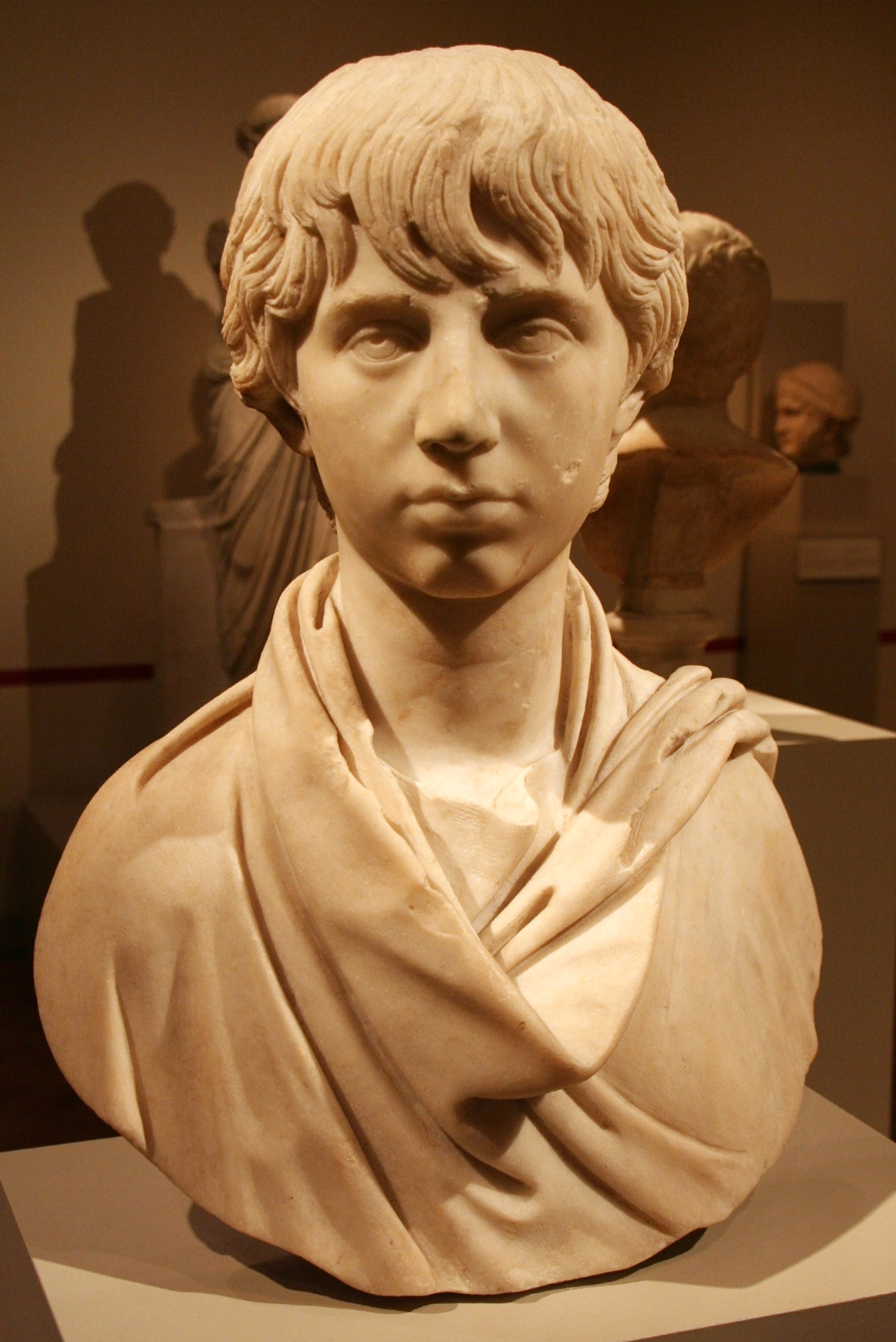
Polydeukes, favourite of Herodes Atticus – Altes Museum, Berlin

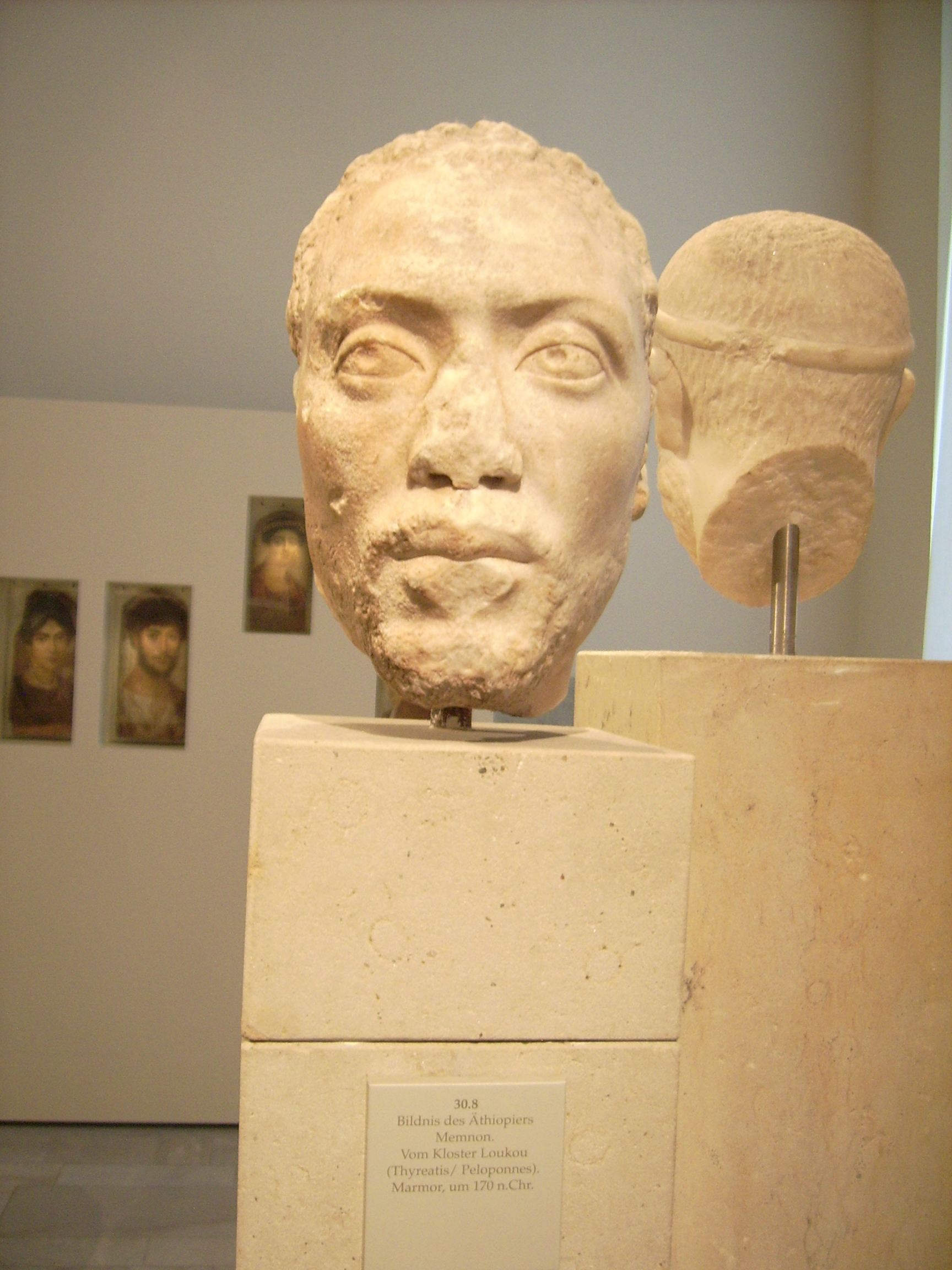
Memnon the Ethiopian, foster child and student of Herodes Atticus; marble, c. 170 AD, from the villa of Herodes Atticus (Altes Museum, Berlin)

Herodes Atticus was born on the family estate in Marathon, Greece, and spent his childhood years between Greece and Italy. According to Juvenal he received an education in rhetoric and philosophy from many of the best teachers from both Greek and Roman culture. However, Herodes Atticus remained entirely Greek in his cultural outlook.

He was sent at the age of 11 or 12 to Rome, to live with Publius Calvisius Tullus Ruso, grandfather of the future emperor Marcus Aurelius. There he became acquainted with the upper strata of the Roman aristocracy and learned Latin.

In 125 Emperor Hadrian appointed him praefectus of the free cities in the Roman province of Asia. There in Smyrna he was a student of Favorinus and later inherited his library. Like Favorinus, he was a harsh critic of Stoicism.

He later returned to Athens, where he became famous as a teacher. In 126-127, Herodes Atticus was elected and served as an Archon of Athens. In 140, the Emperor Antoninus Pius invited him to Rome to educate his two adopted sons, the future Emperors Marcus Aurelius and Lucius Verus. Sometime after, he was betrothed to Appia Annia Regilla, a wealthy Roman aristocrat who was related to the wife of Antoninus Pius, Faustina the Elder. When Regilla and Herodes Atticus married, she was 14 years old and he was 40. As a mark of his friendship, Antoninus Pius appointed Herodes Atticus consul in 143.

Some time after his consulship, he returned to Greece permanently with his wife and their children.

In 160, the year that her brother was consul, Regilla, while eight months pregnant, was brutally kicked in the abdomen by a freedman of Herodes Atticus named Alcimedon. This caused her to go into premature labor, killing her. Consul Appius Annius Atilius Bradua brought charges against his brother-in-law in Rome, alleging that Herodes Atticus had ordered her beaten to death; Emperor Marcus Aurelius exonerated his old tutor of his wife's murder.

Herodes Atticus was the teacher of three notable students: Achilles, Memnon and Polydeuces (Polydeukes). "The aged Herodes Atticus in a public paroxysm of despair at the death of his perhaps eromenos Polydeukes, commissioned games, inscriptions and sculptures on a lavish scale and then died, inconsolable, shortly afterwards." He also taught many orators and philosophers such as Aristocles of Pergamon.

=== Death and legacy ===
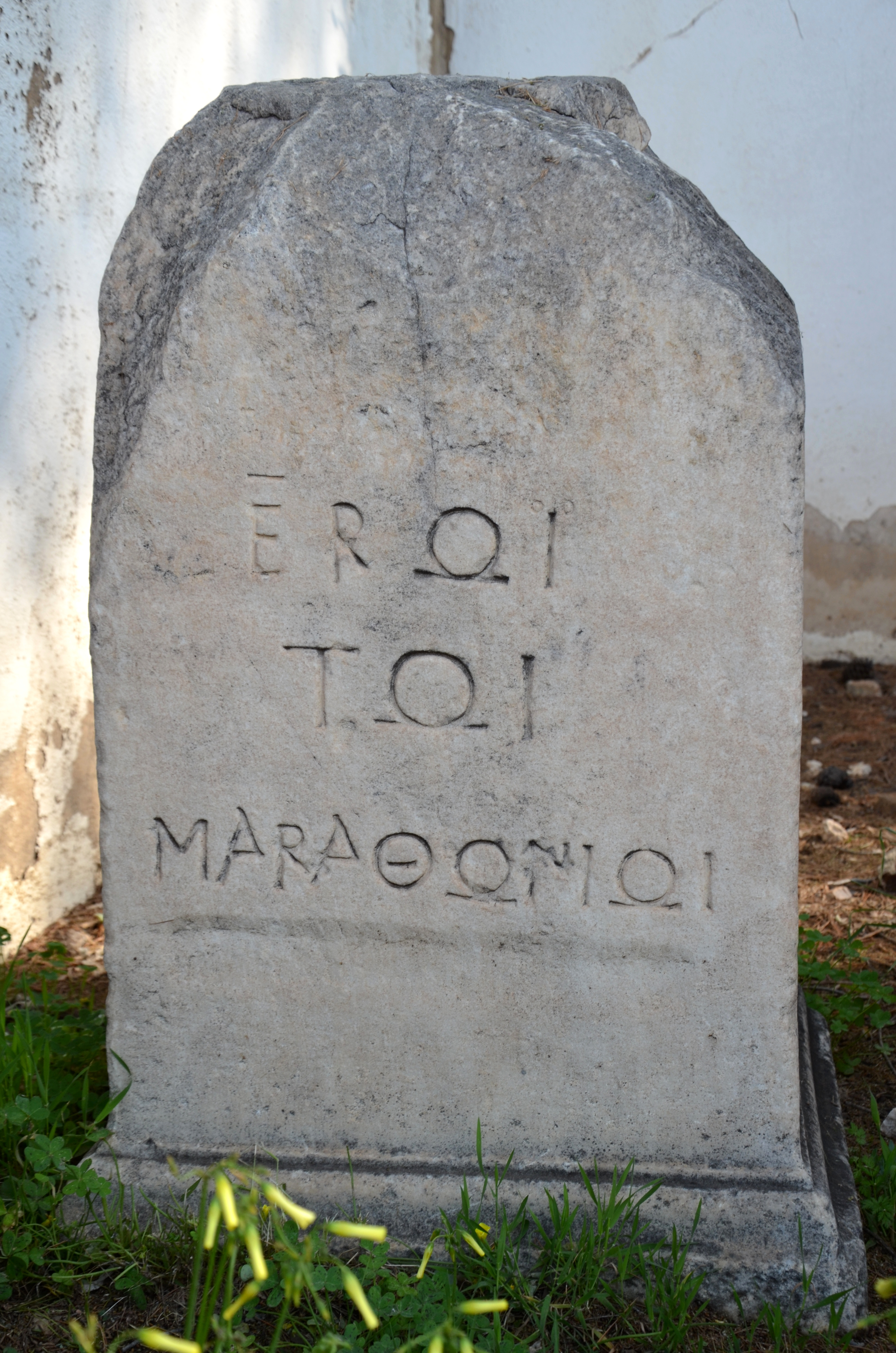
Funerary monument of Herodes Atticus, partly erased

Herodes Atticus had a stormy relationship with the citizens of Athens, but before he died he was reconciled with them. When he died, the citizens of Athens gave him an honoured burial, his funeral taking place in the Panathenaic Stadium, which he had commissioned. A funerary monument for Herodes Atticus was later placed there, calling him the hero of Marathon, though at some point, his name was erased from the monument in an act of damnatio memoriae.

Herodes Atticus had a distinguished reputation for his literary work, most of which is now lost, and was a philanthropist and patron of public works in Greece and Italy.

The couple are commemorated in Herodou Attikou Street and Rigillis Street and Square, in Athens. In Rome, their names are also recorded on modern streets in the Quarto Miglio suburb, close to the area of the Triopio, Rome.

== Buildings and property ==
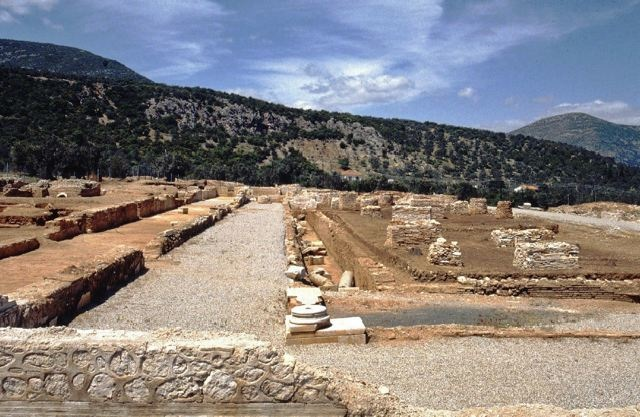
Villa of Herodes Atticus at Loukou in the Peloponnese

Odeon at Corinth

In addition to his villas and estates in Greece and near Rome, he funded more building projects in Roman Greece than anyone aside from the Roman emperors, including:

- the Panathenaic Stadium – Athens
- Odeon – Athens, in memory of his wife
- the odeon at Corinth
- the stadium at Delphi
- the baths at Thermopylae
- the theatre at Patras
- an aqueduct at Canusium in Italy
- an aqueduct at Alexandria Troas
- the Nymphaeum (monumental fountain) with his wife at Olympia
- the baths at Isthmia, in memory of Polydeukion
- various benefactions to the peoples of Thessaly, Epirus, Euboea, Boeotia and Peloponnesus

He owned the marble quarries of Mount Pentelicus which made him a significant profit, as the product was sought after throughout the Roman world.

Herodes Atticus and Regilla controlled a large tract around the third mile of the Appian Way outside Rome known as the "Triopion".

Herodes invested his money by buying land in various areas such as Marathon, Evia, Corinth, Gytheio and the Thyreatis. He seems to have been interested in the production of oil and wine. With these deals he significantly increased the fortune he inherited from his father.

=== Estate at Marathon ===
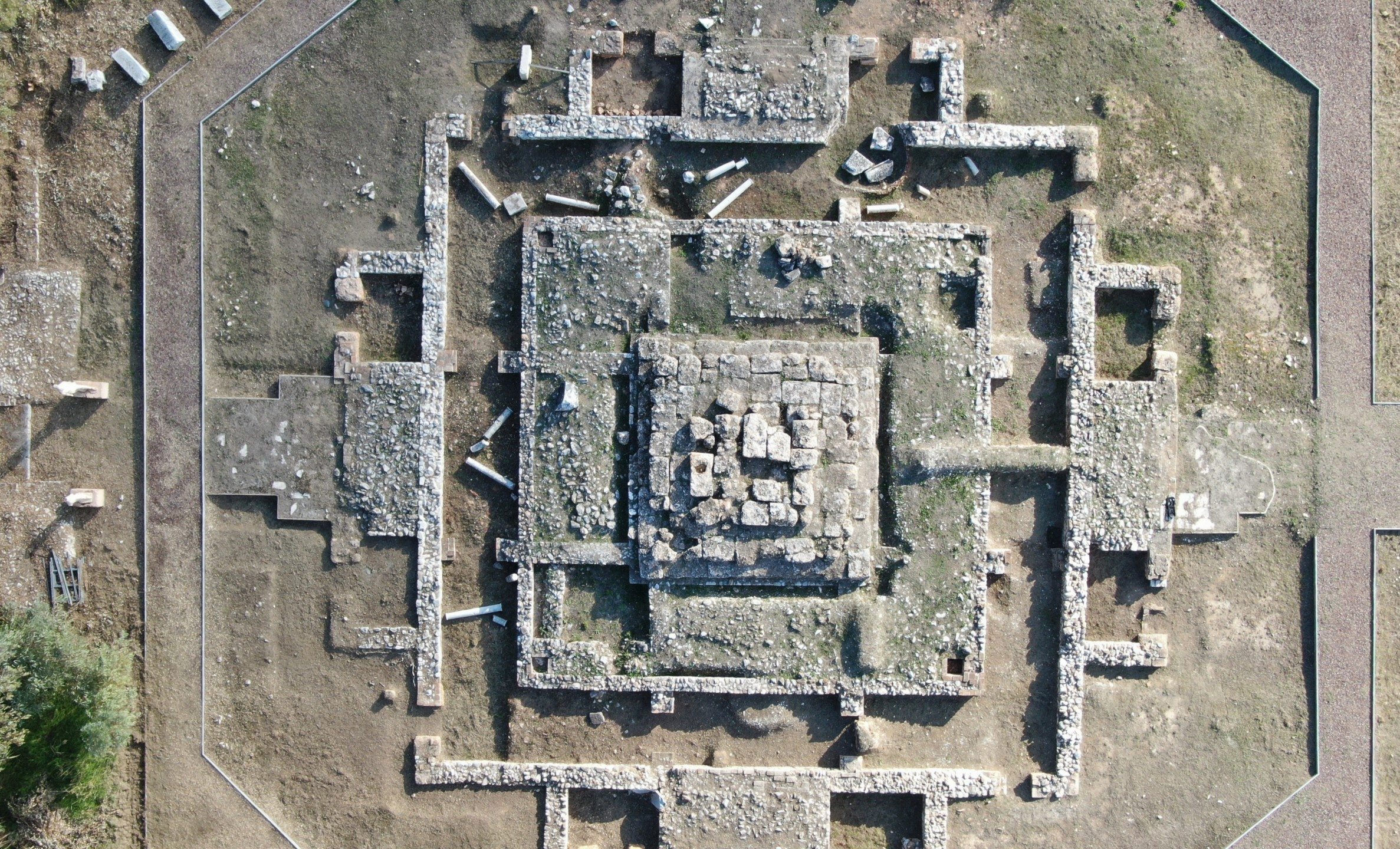
Temple of Isis

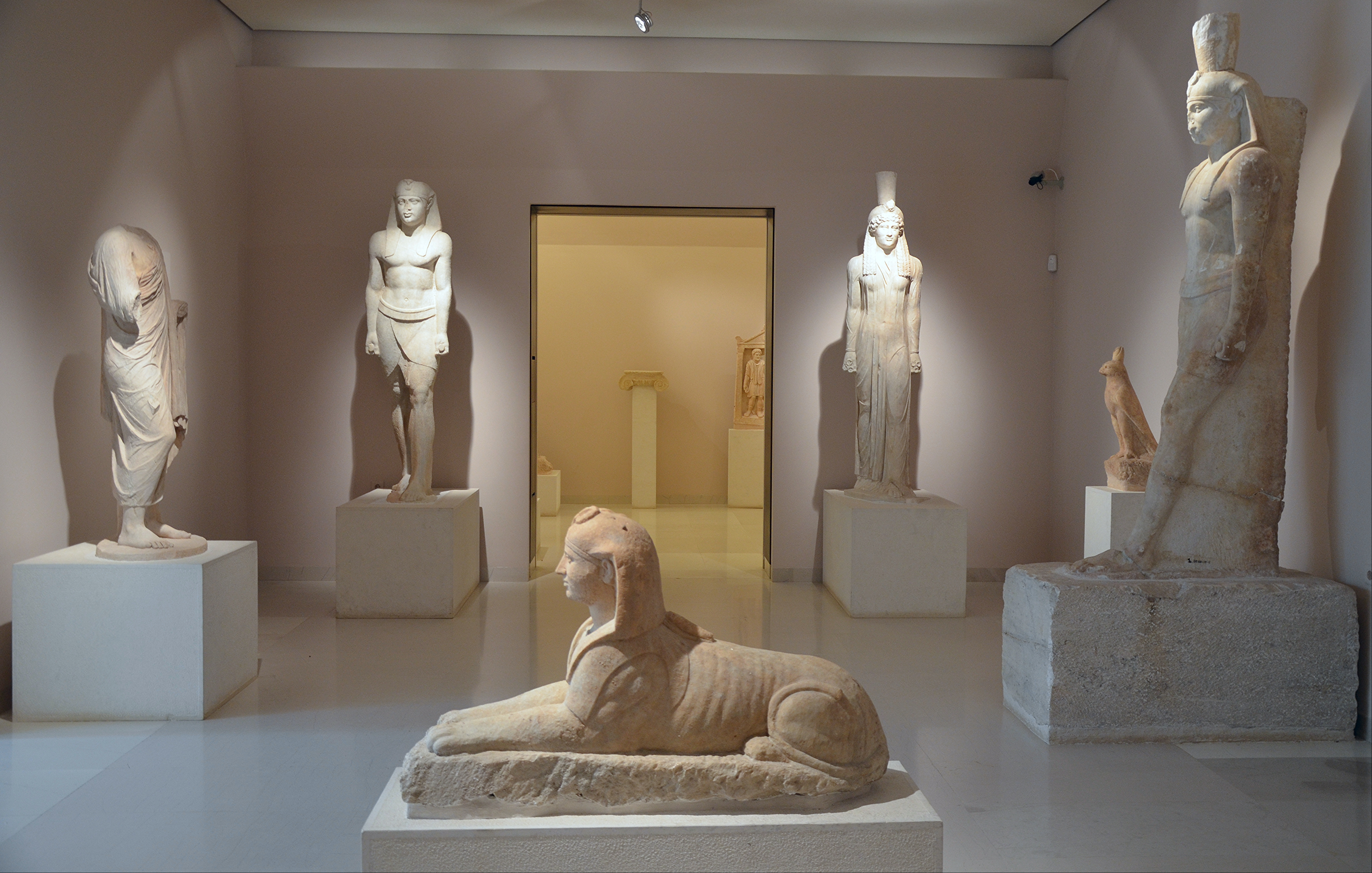
Sculptures from the Sanctuary

Herodes inherited an estate and villa in Marathon south of Oenoe with an area of 680 acres as revealed by an inscription. Finds from the villa are exhibited in the Archaeological Museum of Marathon which also has parts of the monumental arch that covered its entrance. Inscriptions on the arch name it as the "Gateway of Immortal Harmony" and also indicate that the villa compound with 3.3 km-long perimeter wall known today as Mandra tis Grias belonged to Regilla, while he owned an area outside it.

Within the estate, at Brexiza near the seashore, Herodes built an elaborate sanctuary to the Egyptian goddess Isis in 160 AD. According to Philostratos and the inscriptions found, the sanctuary was named Canopus after the famous Serapeum at Canopus, in the Nile Delta near Alexandria. It is believed that Herodes built the sanctuary on an artificial island in this marshy place to imitate the Canopus at Hadrian's Villa, Tivoli. The temple had dimensions of 50 x 50m with a pyramid at the centre. It was framed by statues of deities, some of which are exhibited in the Museum of Marathon and the National Archaeological Museum. From this sanctuary also come the busts of the emperors Marcus Aurelius, Lucius Verus and the well-known one of Herodes, which are now in the museums of the Louvre and Oxford. The building complex also included luxurious marble-clad baths near the seashore with round and hexagonal heated rooms around a large elliptical pool, and an adjoining courtyard to the east with a stoa.

=== Triopion estate ===
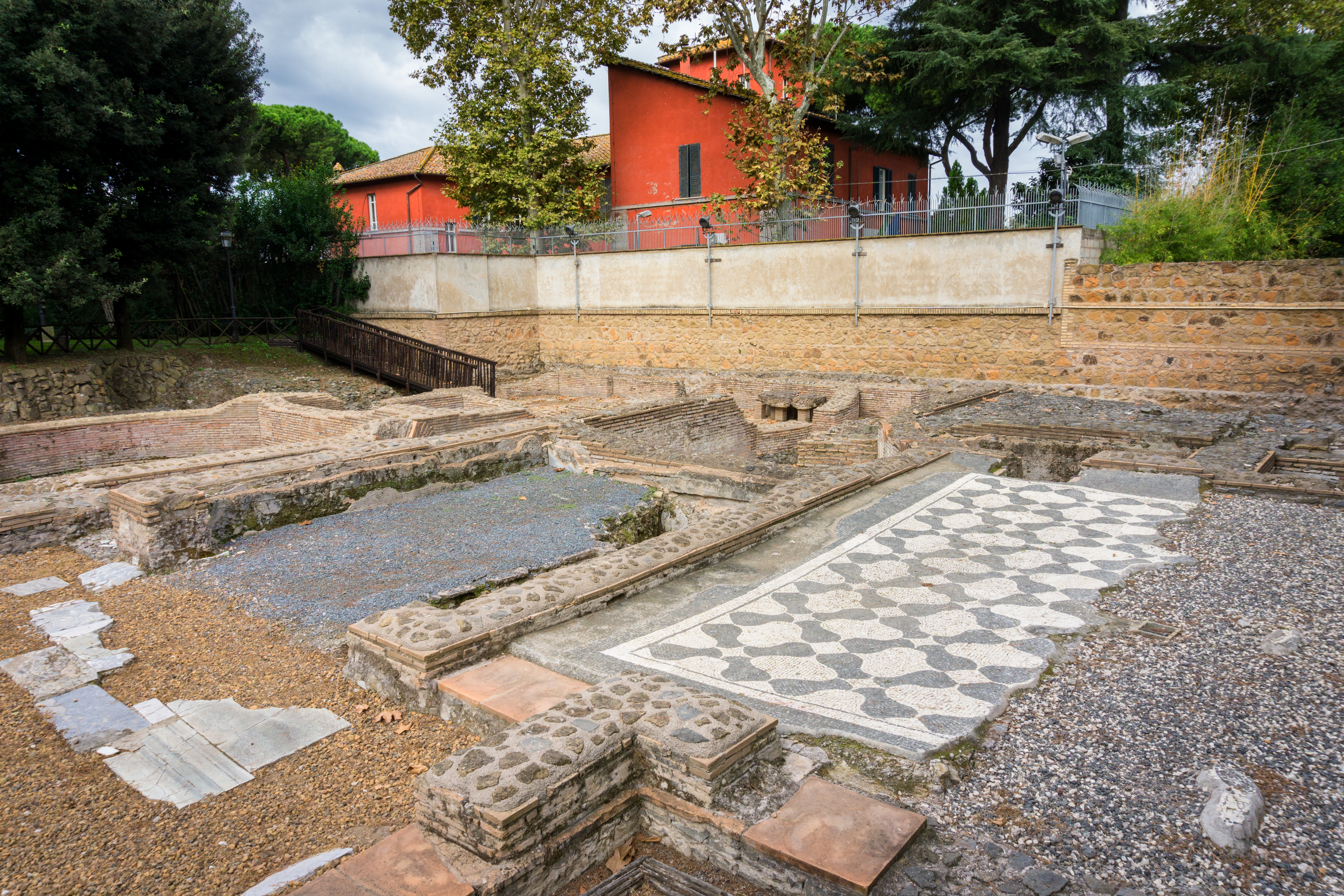
Baths at Capo di Bove, Rome

Herodes owned an estate just outside Rome in an exclusive area around the third milestone of the Appian Way. The estate came from the property of his wife, Regilla, from inscriptions on columns of her cenotaph found near the Via Appia including two long poems by Marcellus of Side. Herodes built a sanctuary there, completed after 155 AD, which he named the "Triopion" (perhaps after the mythical hero Triopas, founder of Cnidos). The sanctuary included a cenotaph to Regilla and a temple to Demeter, Persephone and the "new Demeter" (the deified Faustina Major, wife of Emperor Antoninus Pius). The cenotaph is believed to have been a round domed building with two inscribed columns supporting its front porch that was drawn by Pirro Ligorio. It was located on the right of the Via Appia about 200 m south of the tomb of Caecilia Metella.

The estate probably included a villa and several other buildings that have been discovered nearby, including the baths at Capo di Bove where an inscription to Regilla was found. A building with six caryatid statues may have come from this estate. One column, the "Townley Caryatid", is now in the British Museum. One of the others, fragments of which are in the Villa Albani, Rome, is inscribed with the names of the sculptors Crito and Nicolaus.

The estate later became imperial property and was included in the Villa of Maxentius.

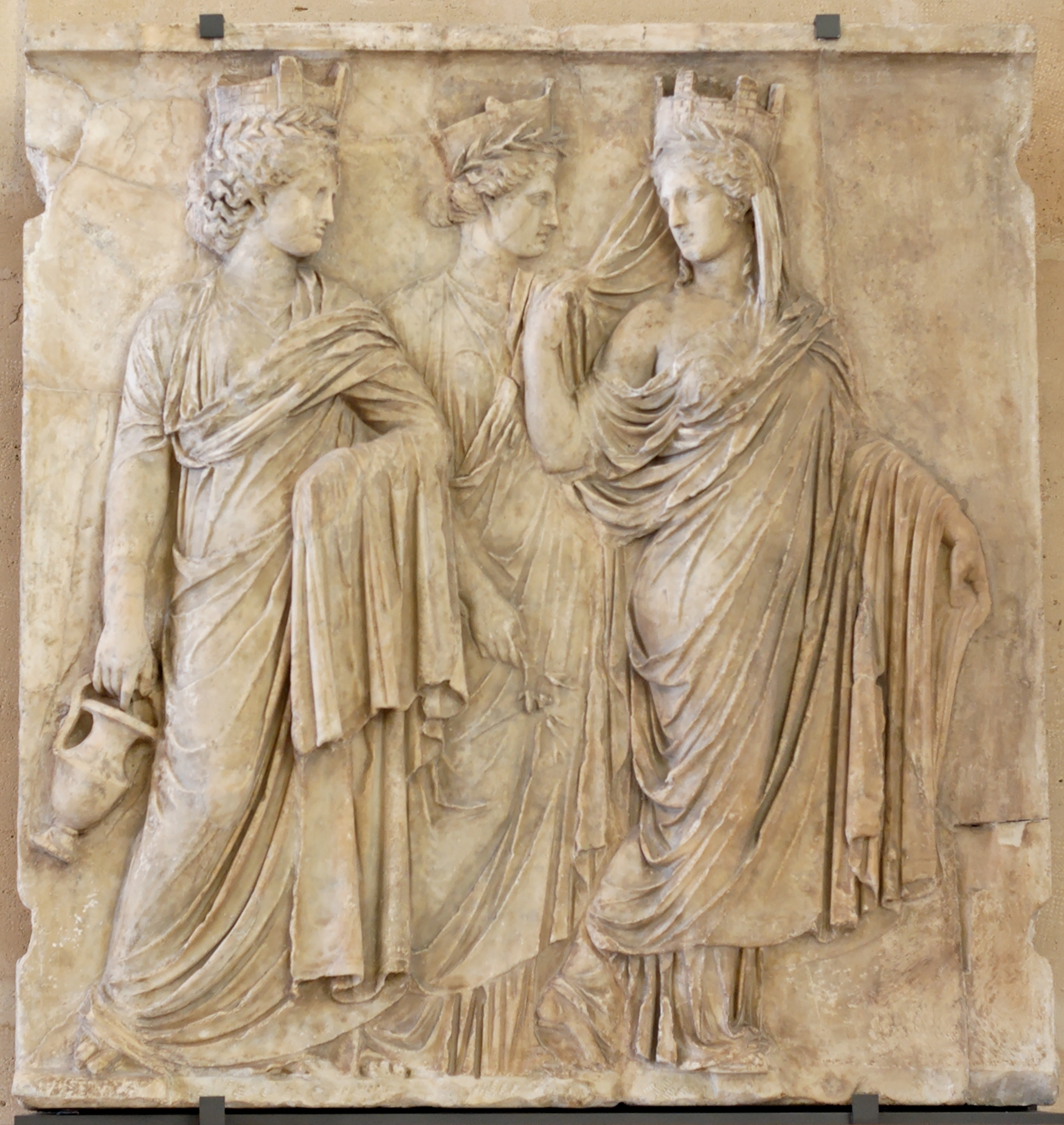
Relief of three Tyches likely from the funeral complex for Regilla (Louvre)

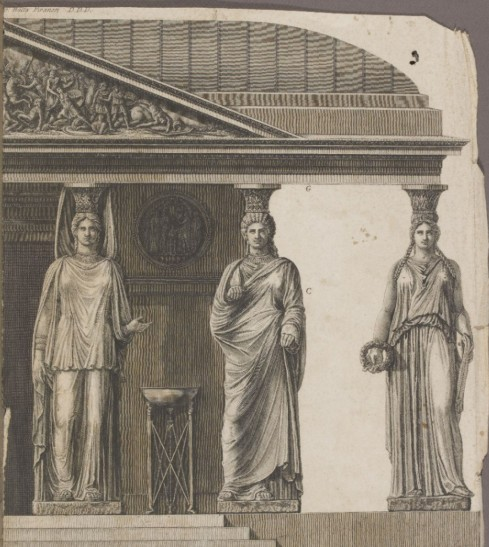
Part of an engraving of the Caryatid building and the "Townley Caryatid" (Giovanni Battista Piranesi 1778)

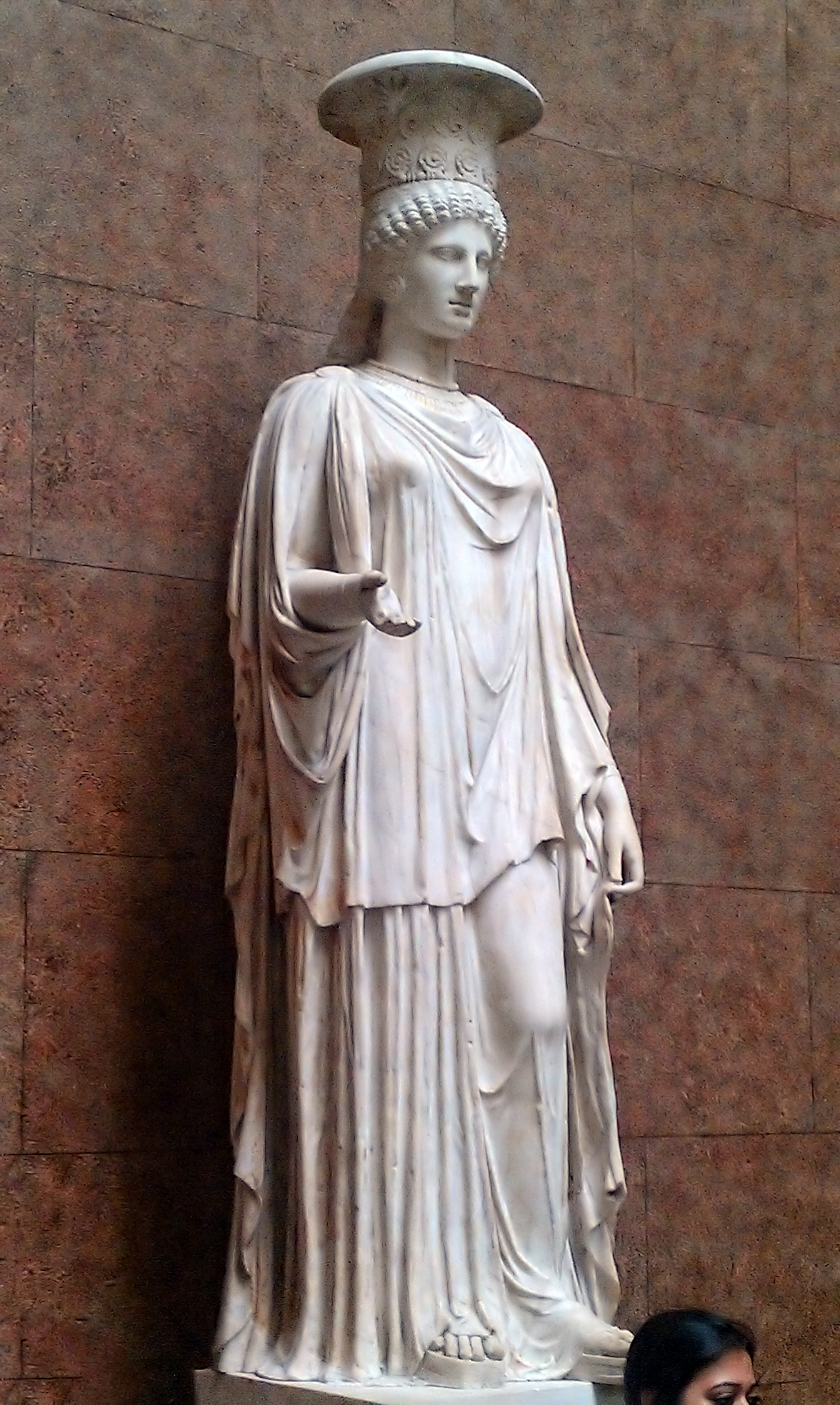
The Townley Caryatid (AD 140-170), British Museum

=== Villa and mausoleum in Kifissia ===
Herodes built his villa in Cephisia near Athens on his estate which spanned a large area in the middle of the town, roughly between the river and today's Kifissia Grove. Cephisia was already reputed as a famous retreat of philosophers by the reign of Hadrian and the healthier climate and environment attracted the Athenian elite who organised symposia on local estates. It was common for Herodes also to provide free instruction in philosophy for selected youths from Athens:

While we were students in Athens, Herodes Atticus, a man of consular rank and of true Grecian eloquence, often invited me to his country houses near that city [...] And there at that time, while we were with him at the villa called Cephisia, both in the heat of summer and under the burning autumnal sun, we protected ourselves against the trying temperature by the shade of its spacious groves, its long, soft promenades, the cool location of the house, its elegant baths with their abundance of sparkling water, and the charm of the villa as a whole, which was everywhere melodious with plashing waters and tuneful birds.

— Aulus Gellius, Noctes Atticae, § 1.2

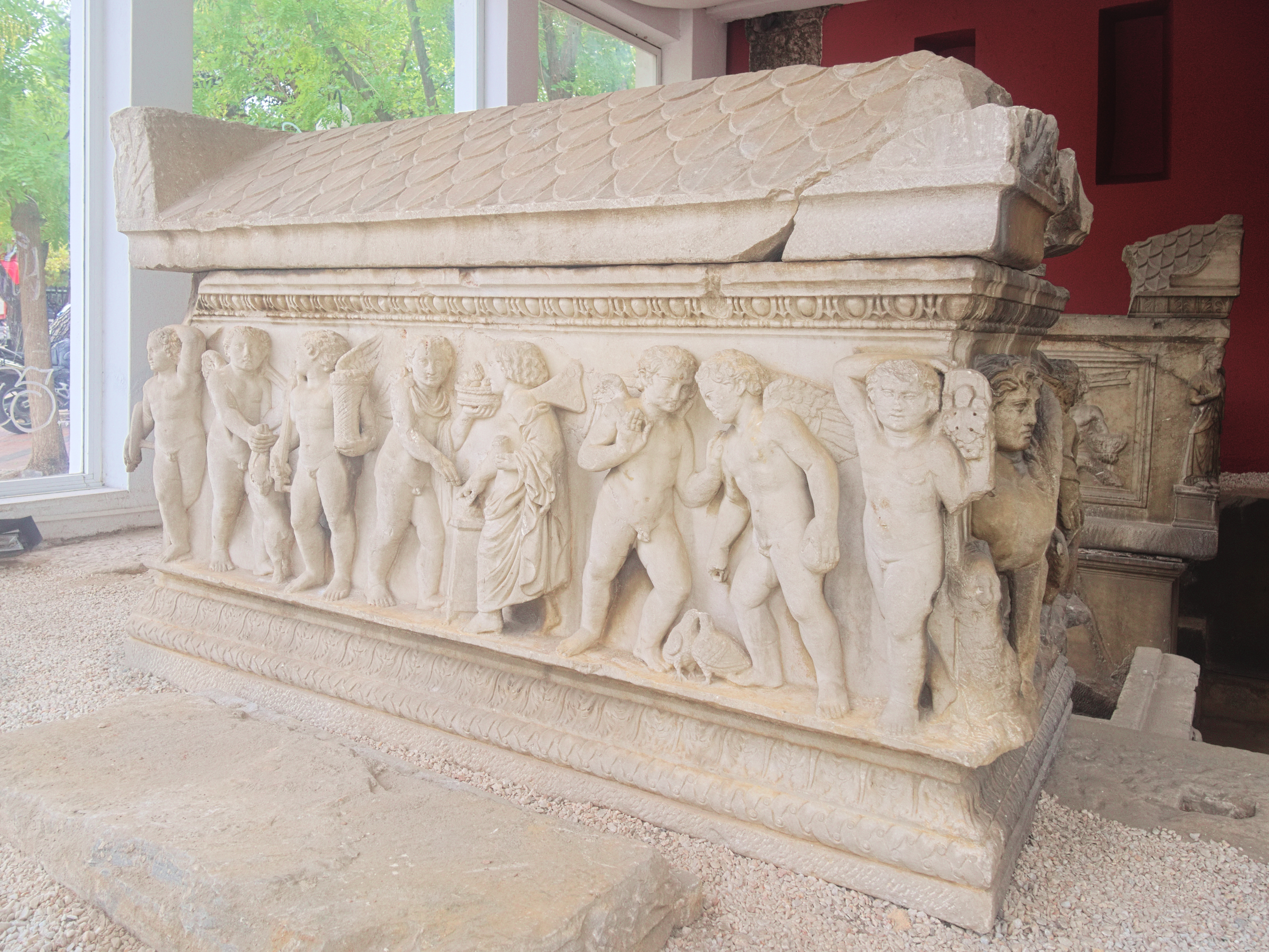
One of the sarcophagi of Herodes' children

Finds from the area include a bust of himself and his pupil and favourite, Polydeuces, other sculptures, many inscriptions, and baths. Kifissia also housed a mausoleum for four of Herodes' children from which four marble sarcophagi survive in their original location in Platanos Square. The so-called Leda sarcophagus was probably that of Elpinice. Recently an exquisite mosaic floor has been discovered along with frescoes that are believed to be part of the villa.

== Children ==
Regilla bore Herodes Atticus six children, of whom three survived to adulthood. They were:

- Son, Claudius – born and died in 141
- Daughter, Elpinice – born as Appia Annia Claudia Atilia Regilla Elpinice Agrippina Atria Polla, 142–165
- Daughter, Athenais (Marcia Annia Claudia Alcia Athenais Gavidia Latiaria), married Lucius Vibullius Rufus. They had a son, Lucius Vibullius Hipparchus, the only recorded grandchild of Herodes Atticus.
- Son, Atticus Bradua – born in 145 as Tiberius Claudius Marcus Appius Atilius Bradua Regillus Atticus
- Son, Regillus – born as Tiberius Claudius Herodes Lucius Vibullius Regillus, 150–155
- Unnamed child who died with Regilla or perhaps three months later in 160

After Regilla died in 160, Herodes Atticus never married again. Sometime after his wife's death, he adopted his cousin's first grandson Lucius Vibullius Claudius Herodes as his son. When Herodes Atticus died in 177, his son Atticus Bradua and his grandchild survived him.

== Sources ==
=== Primary sources ===
- Aulus Gellius, Attic Nights
- Philostratus, Leben der Sophisten. Greek and German by Kai Brodersen. Wiesbaden: Marix 2014, ISBN 978-3-86539-368-5
- Philostratus, Lives of the Sophists, 2.1 (paragraphs 545–566)

=== Secondary material ===
- Byrne, Sean G. (2003). Roman citizens of Athens. Leuven: Peeters. ISBN 9042913487.
- Day, J., An economic history of Athens under Roman domination, Ayers Company Publishers, 1973
- Geagan, Daniel J. (1997). Hoff, Michael C.; Rotroff, Susan I. (eds.). The Romanization of Athens : proceedings of an international conference held at Lincoln, Nebraska (April 1996). Oxford, England: Oxbow Books. pp. 19–32. ISBN 978-1-900188-51-7.
- Gibbon, E., The History of the Decline and Fall of the Roman Empire
- Graindor, P., Un milliardaire antique, Ayers Company Publishers, 1979
- Kennell, Nigel M. "Herodes and the Rhetoric of Tyranny", Classical Philology, 4 (1997), pp. 316–362.
- Lambert, R., Beloved and God: The Story of Hadrian and Antinous, Viking, 1984.
- Papalas, A. J. (1981). "Herodes Atticus: An Essay on Education in the Antonine Age". History of Education Quarterly. 21 (2): 171–188. doi:10.2307/367689. ISSN 0018-2680. JSTOR 367689. S2CID 147284273.
- Pomeroy, S. B. (2007). The murder of Regilla: a case of domestic violence in antiquity. Cambridge, MA: Harvard University Press.
- Potter, David Stone, The Roman Empire at Bay, AD 18–395, Routledge, 2004. ISBN 978-0-415-10058-8
- Rutledge, Harry Carraci (1960). Herodes Atticus: World Citizen, A.D. 101-177 (PhD). Ann Arbor, Michigan: University Microfilms, Inc. Archived from the original on 9 January 2023.
- Schmalz, Geoffrey C. R. (2009). Augustan and Julio-Claudian Athens : a new epigraphy and prosopography. Leiden: Brill. ISBN 978-90-04-17009-4.
- Spawford, Anthony (2012). "Claudius, Atticus Herodes (1), Tiberius". In Hornblower, Simon; Spawford, Anthony (eds.). The Oxford Classical Dictionary (4th ed.). Oxford University Press. p. 325.
- Tobin, Jennifer, Herodes Attikos and the City of Athens: Patronage and Conflict Under the Antonines, J. C. Gieben, 1997.
- Wilson, N. G., Encyclopedia of Ancient Greece, Routledge 2006

Political offices
Preceded by (Sulpicius?) Julianus, and Titus Julius Castus as suffect consuls	Roman consul 143 with Gaius Bellicius Flaccus Torquatus	Succeeded by Quintus Junius Calamus, and Marcus Valerius Junianus as suffect consuls
