= Nymphaeum (Olympia) =

Water distribution structure in Olympia, West Greece Region, Greece

- νυμφαῖον (Ancient Greek)
- Early archaeological name of exedra, "spring house"
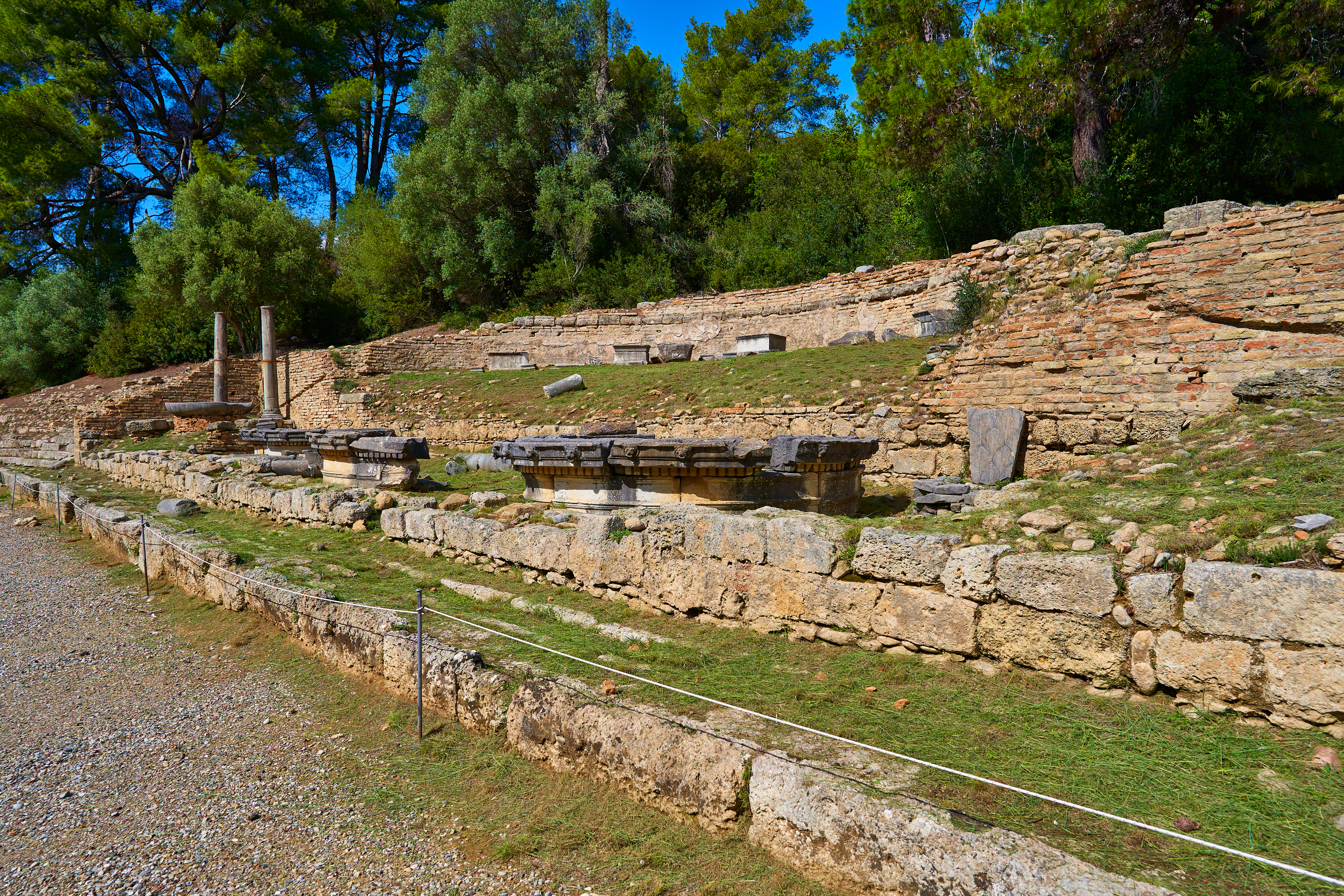
- Ruins of the Nymphaeum at Olympia seen from below. The lowest stage was an open trough leading throughout the site, into which the thirsty or overheated person dipped his patera, or drinking bowl.

- 37°38′20″N 21°37′50″E

Site notes
- Elevation: 50 m (160 ft)
- Archaeologists: German Archaeological Institute at Athens
- Condition: Foundations, partial columns, some restored columns.
- Owner: Ministry of Culture and Sports (Greece)
- Public access: Yes, with purchase of ticket to the site

Nymphaeum (Olympia) (Latin, Ancient Greek: νυμφαῖον), etymologically "home of the nymphs" or water goddesses, at ancient Olympia was the official name of a water-distribution structure constructed in the mid-2nd century at that site to provide water to the masses who attended the Olympic Games in July and August. Nymphaeum was the general name throughout the Mediterranean for an ornate structure that terminated an aqueduct bringing water from distant elevated terrain, say a stream or copious springs. (Note: Noting that the use of the term Nymphaeum for secular purposes dates to the 2nd century, Aristodemou distinguishes several types of Roman Nymphaea: 1. Caves 2. Royal (rectangular with arch and apse) 3. Cascading, or water theatre 4a. "Sigmoid" (exedrae or fountain-houses, such as the Olympic) 4b. Rectilinear 4c. Row of niches.) This one had substructures, statues, and ornately patterned stonework; its main purpose, however, was functional. It received water from the aqueduct into a cistern and released it by stages into a system of open and closed channels leading around the site. The end partaker of the water carried a secular patera, or small drinking bowl, around with him, dipping into an open trough for the water, as is suggested by the fact that at least some of the statues carried such paterae in one hand (though they may also have been performing libations). Troughs went everywhere through the site to accommodate the crowds.

The Nymphaeum is a late feature at the site. Prior to then the more permanent population of athletes, trainers, and administrators relied on wells or short conduits to the Kladeos river, while the spectators suffered greatly, with only the water they could carry in. In mid-century Herodes Atticus, a wealthy savant, engineer, and friend, teacher, and confidant of emperors, was invited to attend the games with his wife Appia Annia Regilla, who was made an honorary priestess of Demeter to get around the exclusion of women. After experiencing the water deficit first hand, he promised to construct at his expense ample water facilities. By the next Olympiad, a first-rate water distribution system, which came to be known as the Nymphaeum of Herodes Atticus, had been constructed. It served as a copious water supply for new baths and the swimming pool of the new grand hotel. More importantly, long troughs brought drinking water along the sides of every playing field for the use of anyone there.

The construction involved more than just the fountain: an aqueduct was an essential part of it. The engineering team had to locate a good source of fresh water and build an aqueduct from it, tunneling through the hill. As it turned out, the source was very likely part of the municipal water supply of ancient Greek Pisa. From the fountain, the water had to be distributed to the whole site. The engineers provided open troughs in publicly accessible places. Hidden pipes went through the walls for transport in places not accessed by the public.

== Development of the water problem at Olympia ==
The Nymphaeum and its entire water supply system are historical developments of Roman Olympia; that is, of the imperial period during which the Romans took a deep interest in the Olympic Games, contributing funds to Olympia, helping to manage the site, competing in its games, and contributing to the new Greco-Roman culture. This phase flourished in the 2nd century. The Romans had dominated at Olympia since the late Roman Republic, but with varying policy toward and varying treatment of it, until, in the time of the "good emperors," they came down solidly in its favor and made many contributions.

A closer connection of Olympia to the Romans began when Elis joined the Achaean League after the Second Macedonian War (200–196 BC), during which the League had been an ally of Rome against Macedon. Rome won. In the subsequent Third Macedonian War (171–168 BC) the League chose the wrong side, leading to its punishment in the Achaean War (146 BC). Roman commander Lucius Mummius Achaicus sacked Corinth. The Senate subsequently dissolved the League and lumped its members into the new province of Macedonia. Olympia was disrespected as the symbol of a subjected enemy. Its moveable wealth was plundered and the statuary was shipped off to Rome.

Finally defeating the last contenders of the long Roman civil war, Octavius Caesar implemented the plan he had made with his adopted father, Julius. The platform had two main planks. First, powerful men were to be suppressed so that they would trouble Rome no more with their bids for power. Second, peace and good government were to be cultivated assiduously (Pax Romana). A new province was created for Greece, Achaea. Changing their policy toward Olympia, the Romans began to invest heavily in its future. The price to the Greeks was that the Romans adopted the place, competing in its games and becoming partners in its management.

All throughout the reigns of the Julio-Claudian dynasty and succeeding Flavian Dynasty; that is, the 1st century, Olympia attracted large numbers of contenders and spectators, becoming an international attraction. It expanded to accommodate the traffic. Among other changes, the stadium was pushed out and the palaistra was moved from the Echo Stoa to its current location. The water resources were not equal to the population. Both pump-up and gravity-flow facilities provided a minimum of drinkable water. By 1898 archaeologists had found nine wells, which required lifting water out. The lines must have been long. Each spectator would have had to bring his own jug.

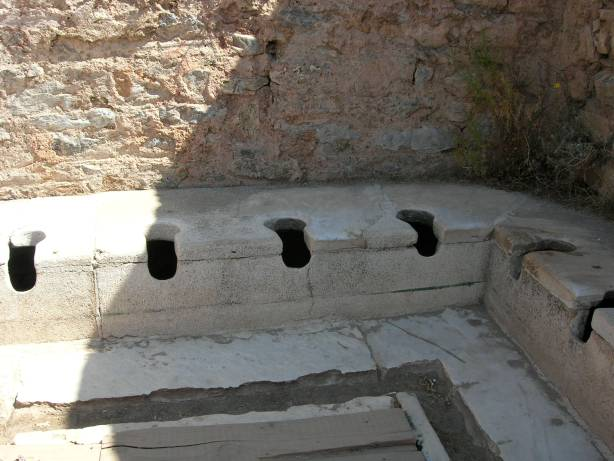
Roman public latrine in the thermae of Ephesus

There were a few facilities that received water from the Kladeos by short aqueducts, notably the "Greek baths," an open swimming pool, built over in the Roman period by the Kladeos baths. The pool was 24 m (26 yd) by 16 m (17 yd) by 1.6 m (5.2 ft) deep. Under it are the remains of a channel pointed south, presumed to have connected to the pool and the Kladeos lower down. It was presumed supplied by surface channels nearby, but not enough of them remains to trace the connections exactly, and that is true of a more extensive channel system northwest of the Phillipeion; that is, between Kronos and the Kladeos Wall. These channels date from the 5th to the 2nd centuries BC. As the elevation of the Kladeos baths is only 35 m (115 ft) and the elevation of the river at the bridge from the town to the park is 38 m (125 ft), the channels must have taken water from the north of the park, above the Kladeos Wall, and diverted it to the facilities. The location of the future Nymphaeum was higher than these mini-aqueducts and thus inaccessible to them. Whether any structures, such as a spring capture, preceded the Nymphaeum is not known. Waste water must have drained to the south toward the confluence of the Kladeos and the Alfeios. The town must have had first options on the Kladeos above Olympia for its municipal water, but that is not known either.

The flow of the Kladeos was never great. When it rained it grew muddy. The lower Kladeos could not be used because all rivers next to settlements received the effluent of sewer ditches, mainly latrines. Roman sanitary regulations required a ditch or other channel with water flowing in it. The toilet seats were placed over the ditch, typically in a row, without regard to male or female. If there were any wooden superstructures, they did not survive. (Note: Judging from the graffiti and the baths it is probably safe to say that the Greeks and Romans were somewhat more frank about the body than today. Their idealization of it in sculpture is among the world's great art.) On the south side, the swifter and more copious Alpheios was of little help because the water, flowing through limestone its whole distance, was too hard (high in dissolved carbonates) to drink.

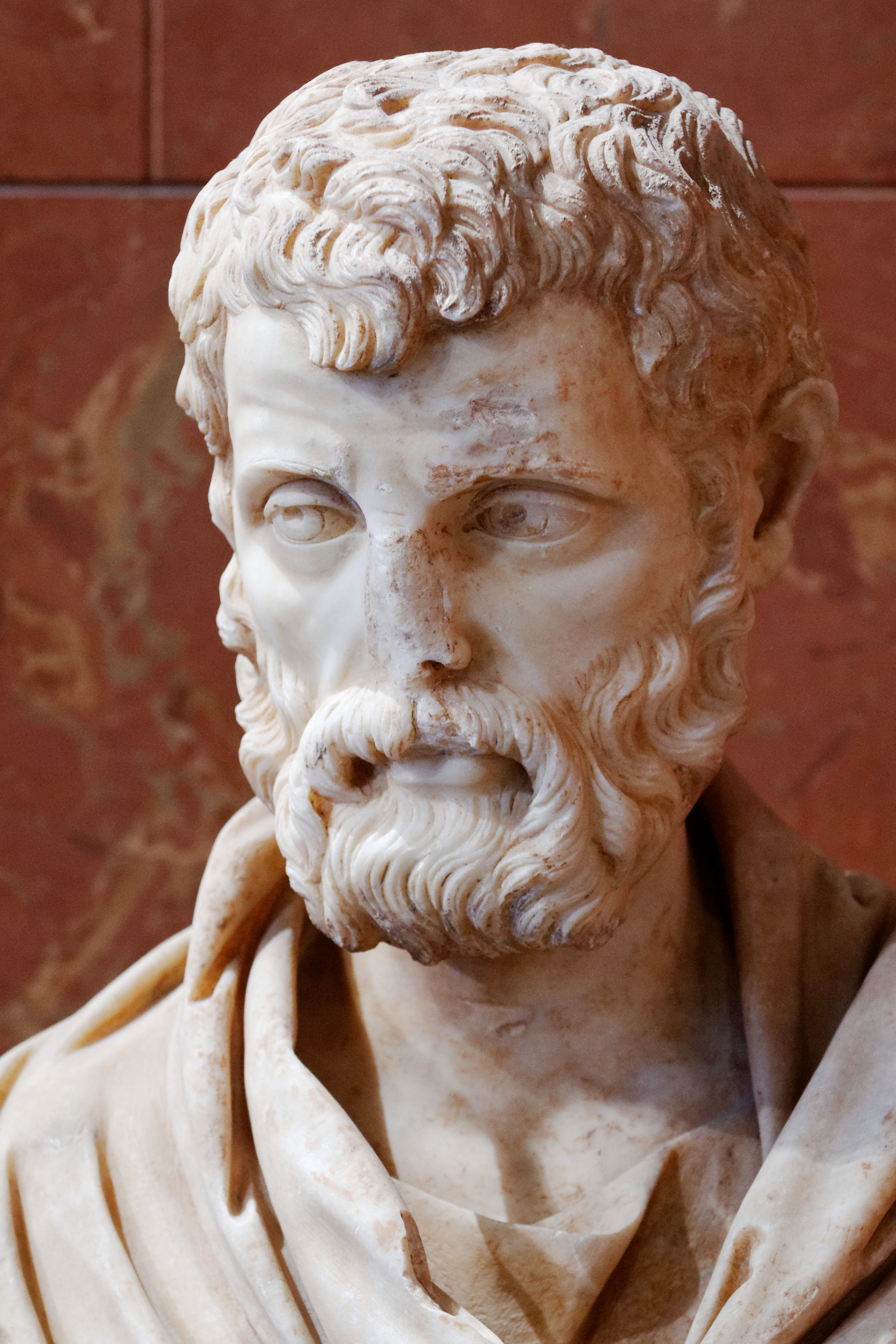
Herodes Atticus, Louvre

The Romans did not address the problem, for reasons unknown now. It was probably true that some people, such as the athletes, trainers and managers, as well as important visitors, had no problem obtaining water. The masses that arrived in July and August, the hottest months of the year, unrelieved by rain, apparently suffered the most. Infectious diseases were rampant, which the citizenry blamed on lack of water (being unfamiliar with microbes). Visiting Olympia could be a hellish experience, yet the spectators continued to show up in large numbers. This was the situation as Herodes Atticus found it in the middle of the 2nd century.

== The gravity flow system of Herodes Atticus ==
=== Engineering principles ===
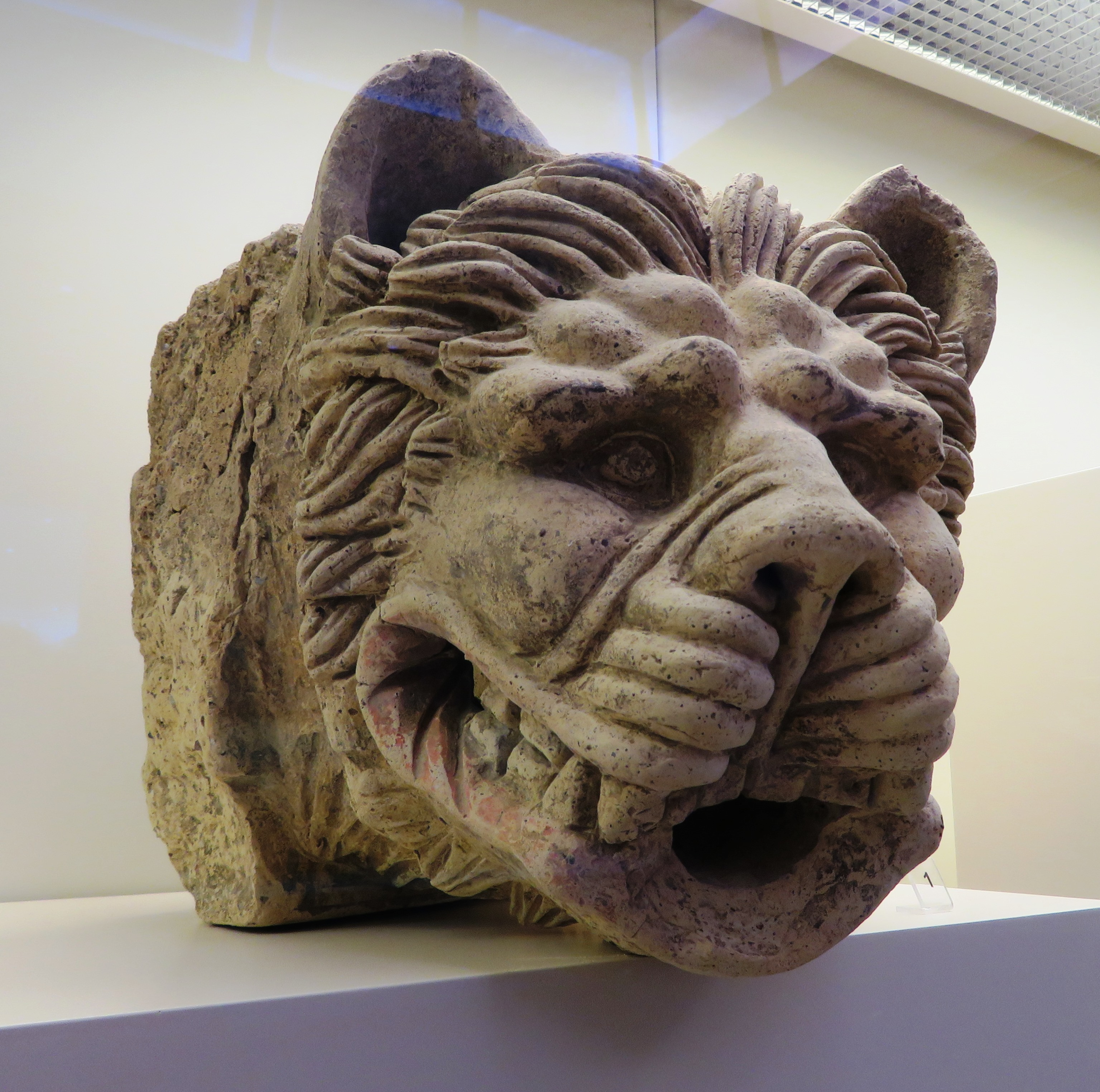
Lion-head spout from Olympia

The ancients had many methods of obtaining water from a source, all either pump-up or gravity flow. The simplest pump-up was a woman filling and carrying a water vessel to the location of use. If the source was not a surface one they dug for it, as at Mycenae, where a tunnel led down to a spring. Potential energy is added in pump-up, not necessarily by humans, but also by animals and mechanical devices.

In gravity flow the water loses potential energy. The water must always be kept moving downhill. Rain capture is one such system, in which rain falling on a roof or terrace drains into a gutter and exits the latter from a spout. So many lion's head spouts were found at Olympia that all the larger buildings must have had them. The method is not effective, however, if it does not rain. A second method is spring capture, in which a spring empties into a collection basin and is piped or channeled from there, such as Delphi had. There was, however, no Mount Parnassus at Olympia.

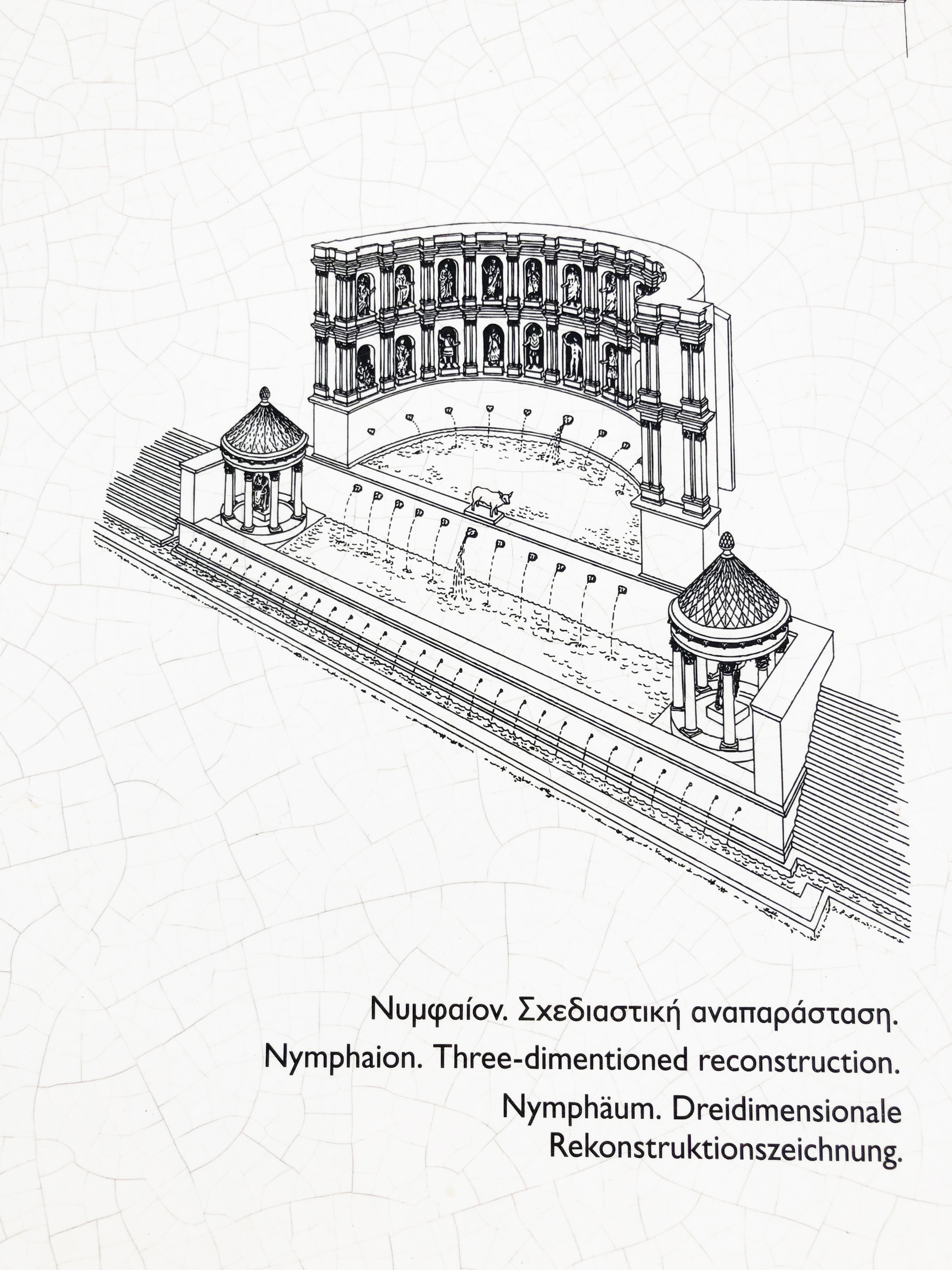
Current, open reconstruction of the "home of the nymphs," the distribution point of the aqueduct to Olympia

None of these methods being effective for municipal water, the Romans became adept at stream capture. Military camps were sited at locations where a stream would run through the camp, usually halfway up a hill. Larger settlements tapped streams from elevated terrain many miles away. The Romans built chutes, or aqueducts, that descended at a low gradient, crossing valleys on bridges and going through hills in tunnels. The key engineering principle was that the downward slope must be kept over the entire length. At the terminus was an elaborate distribution structure, called in the 2nd century a nymphaeum, "home of the nymphs," or water goddesses.

It is in the building of these systems that Herodes Atticus had become in essence a civil engineer with expertise in water supply. It was the duty of wealthy men to manage projects such as these, as it had been under the Republic, at their own expense, or assisted by empire funds, although they could levy taxes to cover it (not a popular method). Prominent men who refused the duty found themselves in public odium, or worse, imperial odium.

=== The aqueduct ===
The Nymphaeum at Olympia was excavated 1877–1878 and the results were published in 1892. The initial excavators believed they had found a spring capture, which they called "the exedra" (ex-hedra for *ex-sedra, "sitting room") in the sense of "spring house." The name stuck for decades. They saw it as a kind of grotto carved into the hill from which a spring was presumed to have flowed. (Note: One of the last presentations of the site as a grotto can be found in Elderkin, G.W. (1941). "The natural and the artificial grotto". Hesperia. 10 (2): 125–137. JSTOR 146536. In it following Adler the rear wall is presented as a sort of hood buried in a cutting in the hill. By Adler's publication the aqueduct had been discovered, but the concept of a spring-house in a grotto still clung to it.)

Some troubling questions remained. If that much water was flowing from the hill, why was it not still flowing? Moreover, there were no seats, and the site was too elevated for easy access. Soon they discovered a large cistern at the back of the main wall fed by a brick tunnel going eastward through the base of the hill along the "treasury terrace" and then turning into the hill. (Note: The tunnel was vaulted, 0.4 m (1.3 ft) wide, 0.72 m (2.4 ft) high.) The tunnel is mounted atop a buttressed wall for stability and elevation control. Whether it was visible in ancient times is unknown. The visible length is 88 m (96 yd), elevation at cistern 50 m (160 ft), elevation at hill entrance 55 m (180 ft). The 20-foot difference gave plenty of momentum to the flow, which must have come jetting impressively out the spouts of the Nymphaeum. (Note: The area of the water entering the cistern is more than one square foot. If the entire closed conduit were full and there were no pressure component from the hill, the standing pressure would be over 62.4x20/144 or 8.6 psi. However, the water was never standing or the conduit full. The pressure that counted for the velocity of water in the upper spouts was the pressure of the depth of water over the entrances of the spouts. This is where the practical knowledge of the Graeco-Roman hydraulic engineers comes into play. Their 4-pool system: the cistern under the hill, the cistern behind the Nymphaeum, and the two upper pools of the Nymphaeum, insures that there is no unbroken water column hundreds of feet high causing unmanageable and dangerous pressures in the bottom-most spouts. Contrary to purely artistic interpretations, the shape of the fountain was primarily functional.)

The hill above the wall has since been sacrificed to the road, which passes through a cut. A "cave" opening is visible at the top of the cut, about 70 m (230 ft). (Note: The point of visibility in Google Street View is at the location on the curve closest to Treasury Terrace, on its perpendicular bisector, 37.63927°N 21.63120°E.) The cut has removed any subterranean phases of the aqueduct leading into the hill. At the time of the cut it is not certain the excavators knew the aqueduct came out of the hill. (Note: Although it is a valuable check on some material aspects of antiquity, archaeology is a less than perfect method. It is usually limited by being restricted to one site or part of one at a time; for example, Schliemann's Troy turned out not to be the city of Troy, but only the citadel. The city remains mainly unexcavated. In her recent book (Barringer, Judith M. (2021). Olympia: A Cultural History. Princeton: Princeton University Press. pp. 220–221.) J. Barringer, relying on earlier studies of Olympia, states "This whole structure framed a basin into which water flowed from a 1km-long aqueduct, which came from the south along the north-south path east of the Leonidaion." However, the rule that water flows downhill, being a law of nature as we know it, is invariant. The Nymphaion was made the high point of the park for a reason. Olympia is on a slope of the Alfeios valley at the very foot of the hills above it. The slope is toward the Alfeios on the south; aqueducts cannot come from there unless from the hills on the other side of the valley, for which there is even less evidence. The channel taken as influent must be effluent. Adler's 1km quoted by Barringer has no meaning out of context; discounting the Alfeios itself, there are no sources 1km away except to the north, beyond the Kronos hill. In Ch. 5 Plate 1, Barringer has the real aqueduct labeled as a retaining wall, which it can't be, since there is no loose or rocky slope to retain. The wall instead is retained from toppling by metal braces.) A French map of 1878 and a Russian map of 1885 show the aqueduct on the terrace but no road. Dörpfeld's map of 1887 shows it with worksheds along it (long since gone). The date of the road is therefore most likely 1886 (given accurate maps).

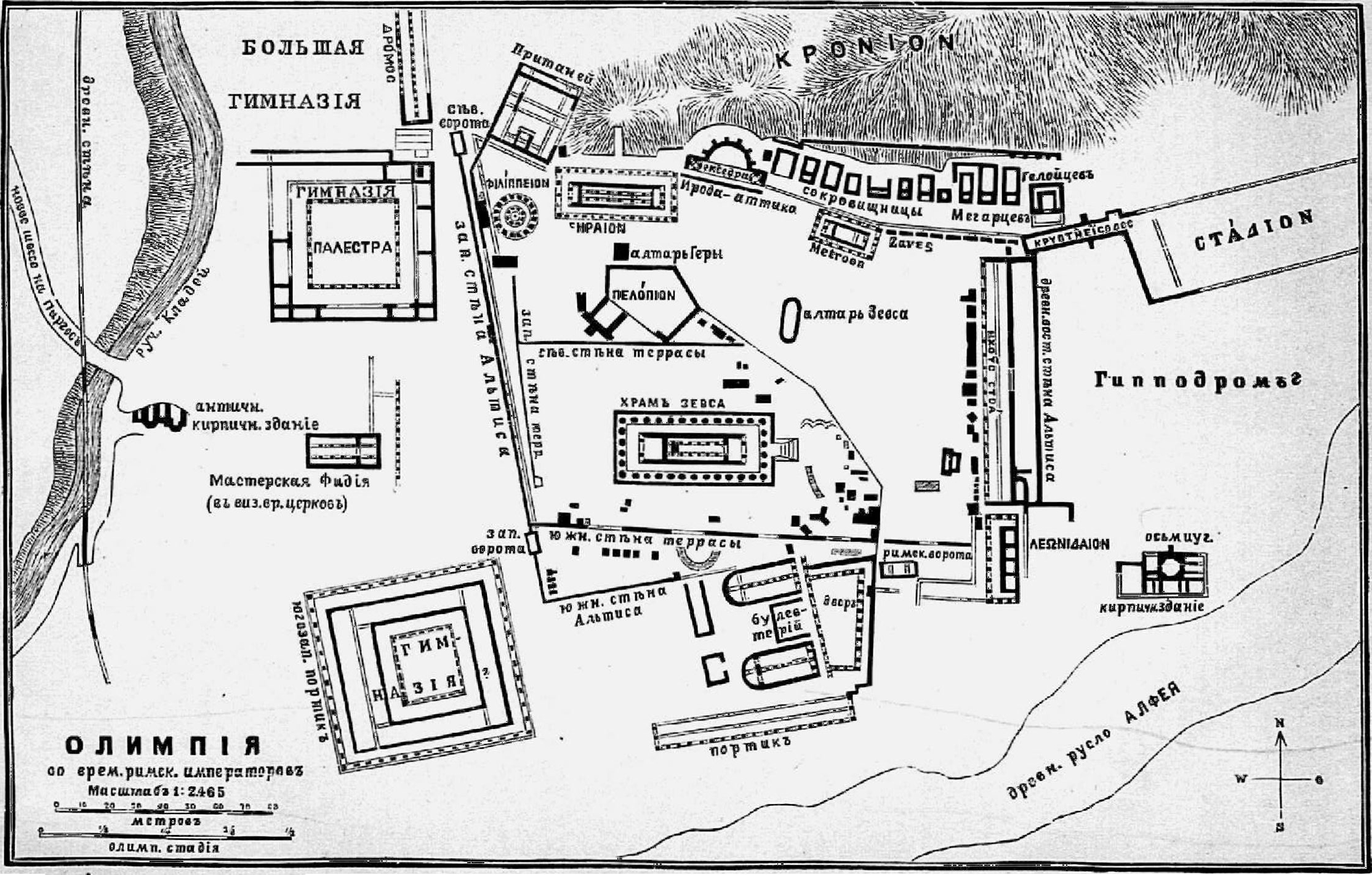
Russian map of Olympia, 1885

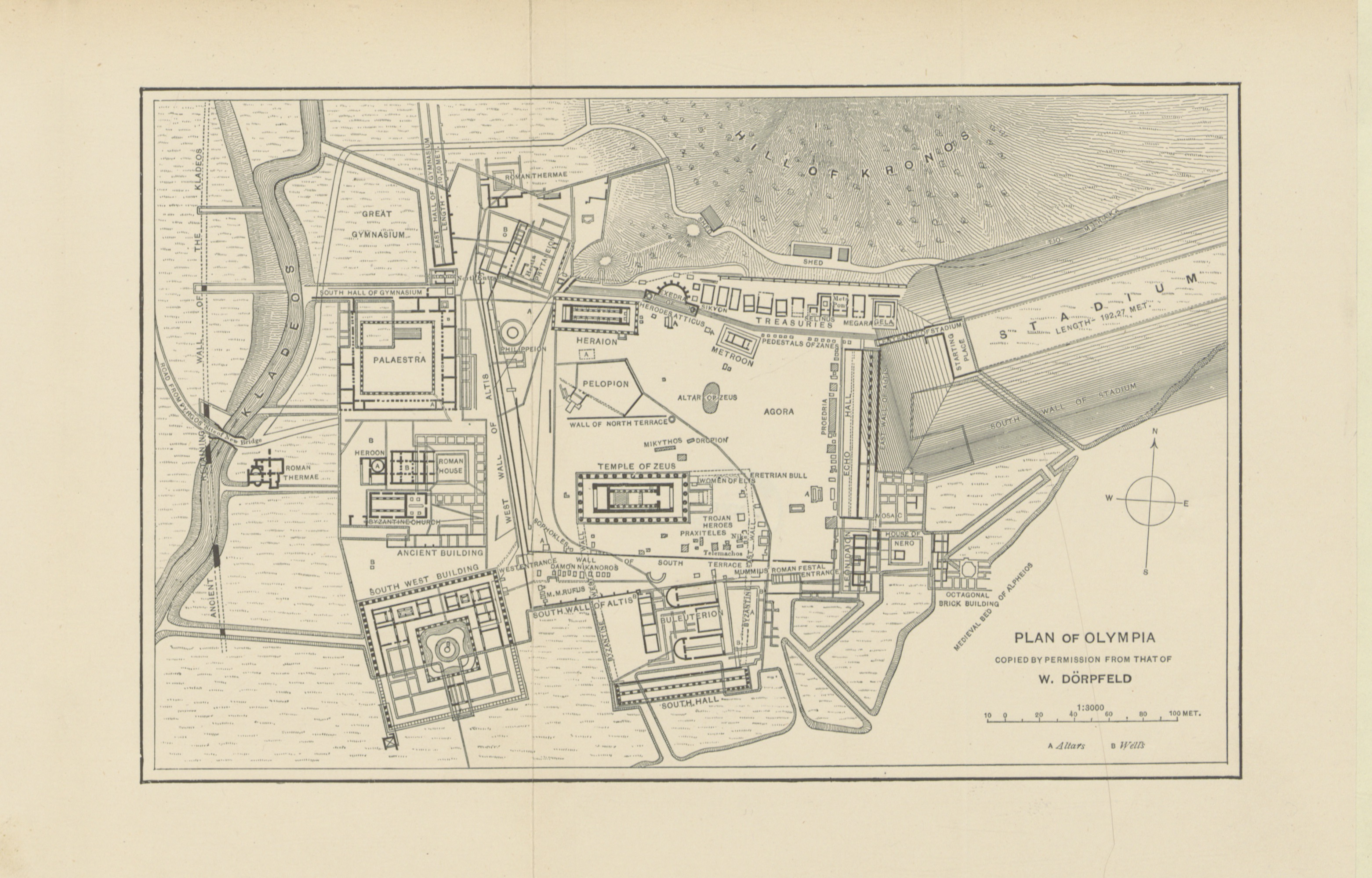
After Dörpfeld's map of 1887

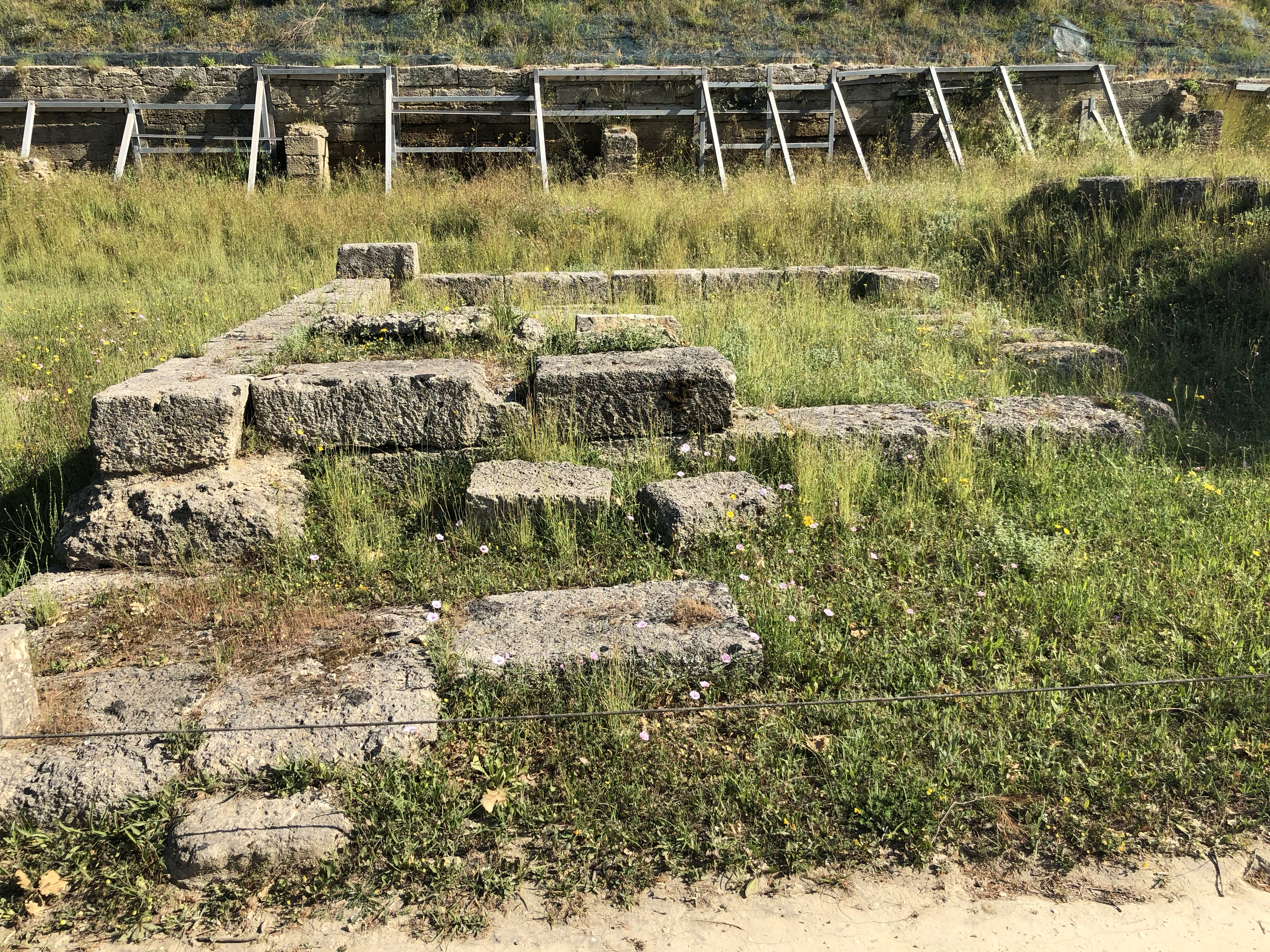
The aqueduct shown behind the Treasury of Cyrene, shored up by a metal framework

Adler believed the source was the upper Kladeos "in the southwestern spur of Erymanthus Mountain." The terrain map shows Erymanthos as a massif in the vicinity of Pothos (37.70253°N 21.68732°E and Lalas (37.71020°N 21.72002°E), with a long ridge extending to the SW, of which Kronion is the very last hill. The Kladeos begins in the vicinity of the village of Kladeos to the north of the spur; however, it is far too northward to be Adler's 1 km from Olympia.

The 1 km only gets you upriver as far as the north of the village of Archaia Olympia. Adler apparently based the number on elevation. The 50 m elevation of the river at that point matches the 50 m elevation of the top of the Nymphaeum. As an established archaeologist would have been familiar with both the hydrology and terrain maps, an explanation might be sought in the original date of his comment, which was perhaps before discovery and excavation of the remaining aqueduct. The high end of the aqueduct at about 55 m is matched by the elevation of the river at Koskinas 2 km north of Olympia. If the water did come from a tunnel through the hill, the terrain on the other side is at about 60 m, but the cave in the road cut is about 70 m. An aqueduct of 74 m on the north side of the spur would have to reach the sources of the Kladeos in Erymanthos, near Mageiras at 3.5 km from Olympia.

There are, however, good reasons for thinking the engineers did not run the aqueduct to the north of the spur. If the existing sources from the middle Kladeos were not adequate, then the different branches of the upper Kladeos, each containing less water, would not be either. Since the climate is about the same as it was and the geology has not changed much, the ancient water was probably most copious where the modern water is, in the higher mountains to the east, the sources of the municipal water supplies there.

The surviving aqueduct enters from the east, not the west, placing it on the southeastern face of the ridge. The only other remnant was a projection above the surface on a hilltop in the village of Miraka, now in downtown Pisa, reported about the time of the excavation of Olympia. The projection was presumably removed during urban renewal. The elevation is about 108 m (354 ft), but only ephemeral streams are in the vicinity, not much good for permanent water sources. The population used them for discharge of waste water, which descended to the Alpheios.

The average precipitation in Greece today is roughly 600 mm per year in the plains and 2000 mm or more per year in the mountains. The imbalance was probably not much different in classical times; i.e., the water was to be found in the mountains, which is where Herodes Atticus' engineers would have looked for it, in the "hills of Linaria and Muria." However, urban Linaria is at 44 m (144 ft), 4.53 km (2.81 mi) from Olympia; Muria at 60 m (200 ft) 6.77 km (4.21 mi), so the flow was not from those places. Ephemeral rivers extend north to the required elevations, but being ephemeral they transported only waste water, not drinking water.

A little further to the east, at 15.14 km (9.41 mi) from Olympia and 115 m (377 ft) elevation, is the right-bank tributary of the Alfeios, the Erymanthos, descending copiously from the heights of Mount Erymanthos through rapids. The mountain stream descends as a pebble-bottom ditch choked with vegetation from springs and waterfalls of the upper col until it reaches Tripotama as a good-sized, fast-flowing shallow river. There it enters Erymanthos gorge. There are no tracks along its whitewater extent through there until it reaches Haratsariou gorge, where there is a road crossing over an iron bridge, the Nemouta bridge. Southward from there a difficult hiking trail crosses the mouths of two ravines conducting additional water through a cascading region known as Nemouta Falls, some 30 waterfalls draining a wider region, which enhance the flow below.

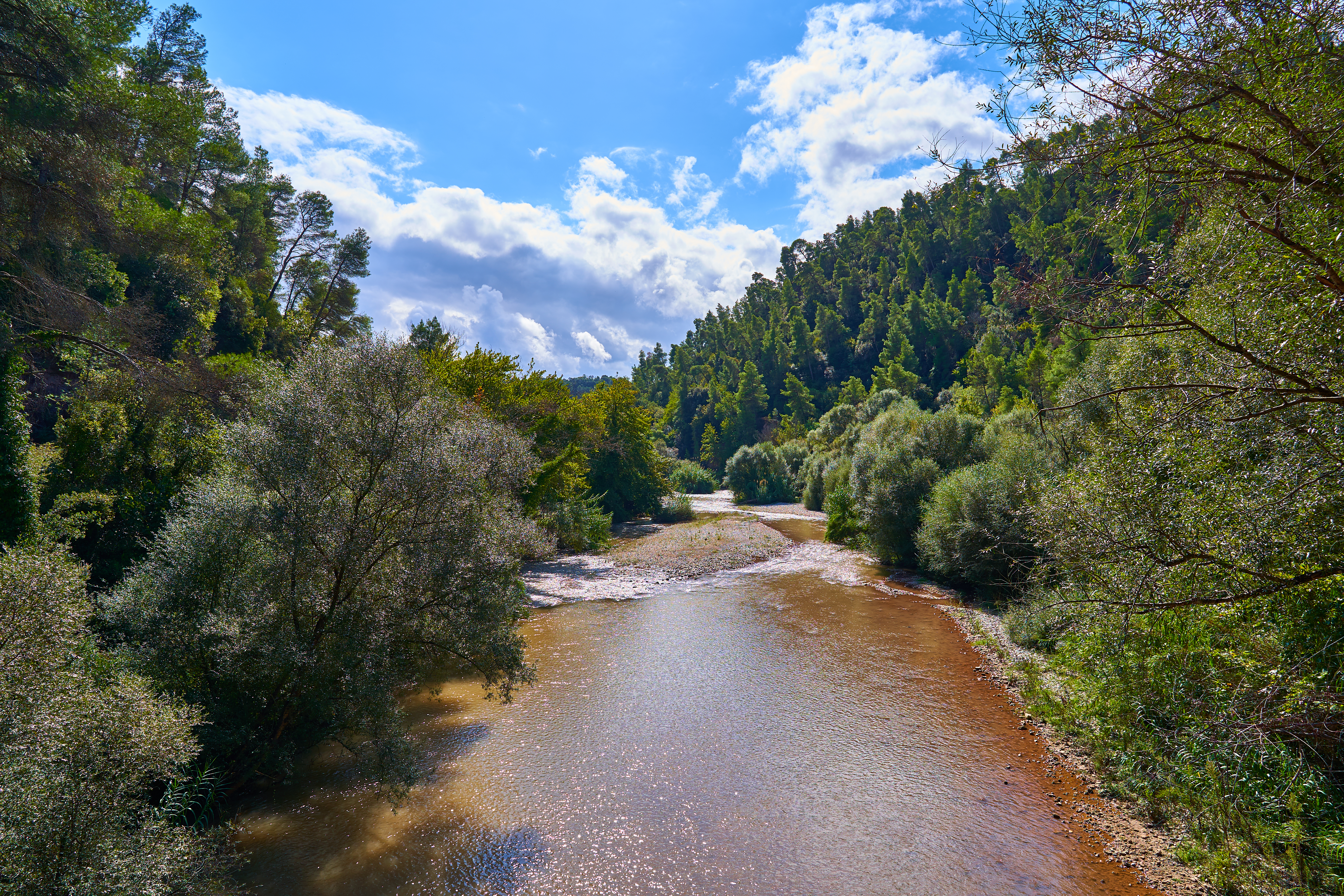
The Erymanthos looking upstream from the bridge above the modern water treatment plant.

Further up the Alfeios is another tributary, the Ladon, of similar flow. A hydroelectric dam has been placed across it at 37.5861°N 21.795°E, Ladon Lake. The lake is far to the north, but at lower elevations the Erymanthos rises faster than the Ladon by about 20 m, which excludes the Ladon from being the source of the aqueduct at Miraka. The Erymanthos, then, is the best logical choice for the source of the aqueduct according to the circumstantial evidence. Starting in 2013, a new water treatment plant on the Elis side of the middle Erymanthos river began delivering (via gravity-flow underground channels) a fixed rate of 0.6 cubic meters per second of drinking water on a fixed monthly schedule to all the communities downstream in the Alfeios system as far as Pyrgos; i.e., all north and central Elis. Hydroelectric and irrigational water is taken from different streams on an optimal allocation basis. Evidently, the value of the Erymanthos for municipal supplies has long been known and appreciated.

All the hydrologic circumstances together offer a credible view of Herodes Atticus' engineering plan and account for its success, although little of it can as yet be proved by regional archaeology. Before Herodes, Olympia depended on wells, rainfall, and the Olympia municipal water system; i.e., the Kladeos, for its water supplies, which became less adequate as the whole system was taxed by population growth and Roman internationalism. Herodes liberated Olympia from dependence on local water and brought in water from the Pisa municipal system, which was probably already tapping the Erymanthos, as there was plenty of water for all.

== Reference bibliography ==
- Frazer, J.G. (1898). Pausanias's Description of Greece: Translation. Vol. IV Commentary on Books VI – VIII. London: Macmillen and Co., Limited.
- Laurence, Karen A. (2012). "Chapter 4: The sanctuary of Zeus at Olympia: Conservatism and change in a Panhellenic sanctuary". Roman Infrastructural Changes to Greek Sanctuaries and Games: Panhellenism in the Roman Empire, Formations of New Identities (PhD). University of Michigan. hdl:2027.42/93878. Contains a chapter on the Altis during the Roman period.
- Rutledge, Harry Carraci (1960). Herodes Atticus: World Citizen, A.D. 101-177 (PhD). Ann Arbor, Michigan: University Microfilms, Inc.
