= Capo di Bove =

Ancient Roman thermal baths on the Appian Way outside Rome

- Capo di Bove
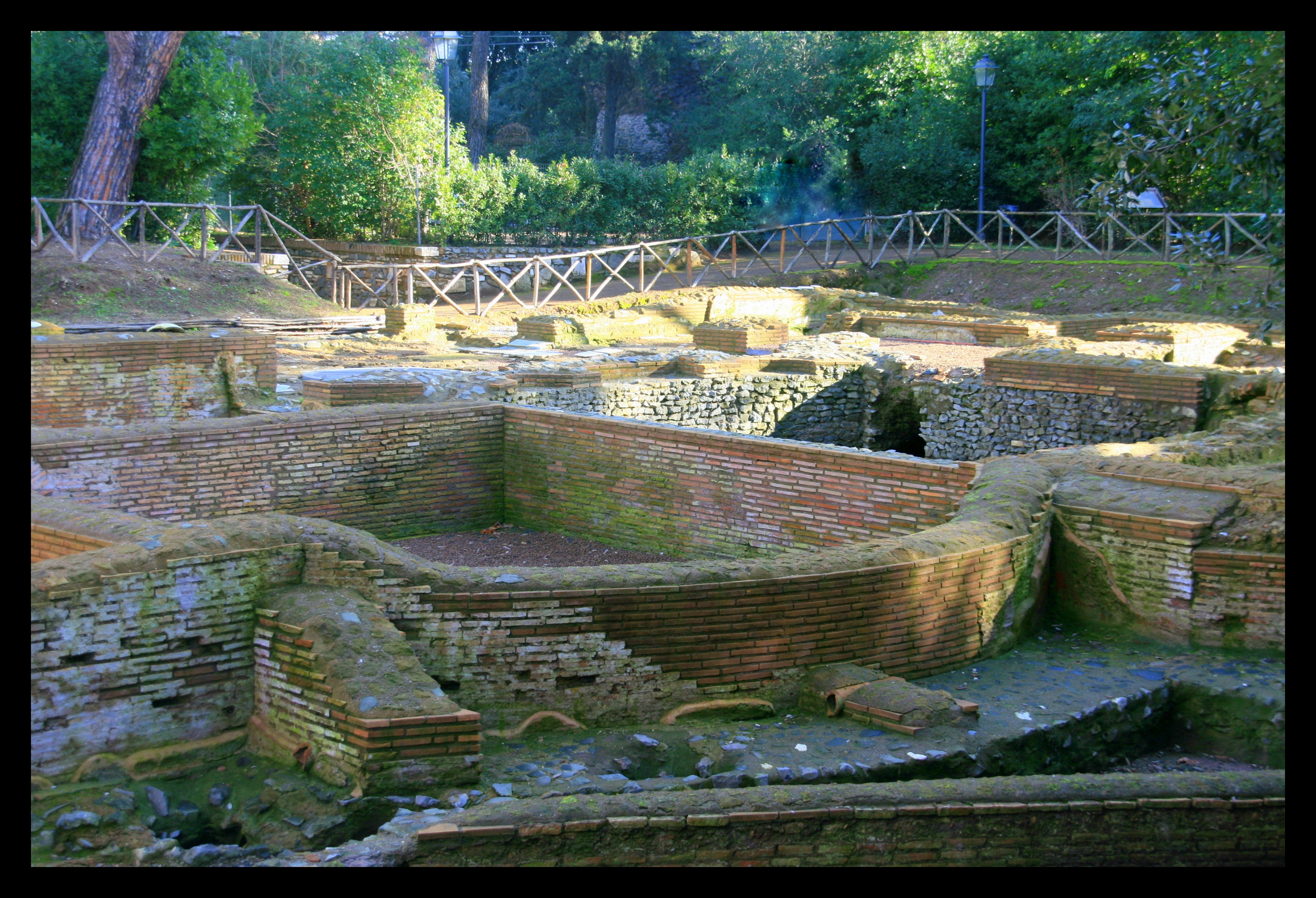
- The excavations at Capo di Bove.

- Location within Italy
- 41°50′54.28″N 12°31′26.5″E
- Type: Dwelling
- Periods: Roman Imperial
- Cultures: Roman
- Location: Rome, Italy
- Region: Lazio

Site notes
- Condition: Ruined
- Owner: Public
- Public access: Yes
- Website: Official website

Capo di Bove is an archaeological site on the Appian Way on the outskirts of Rome, Italy. It contains the thermal baths of a vast property owned in the 2nd century AD by Herodes Atticus and his wife Annia Regilla.

== History ==
Formerly privately owned, the property at No. 222 on the Appian Way was acquired by the Italian Government in 2002. The area of the baths was at that time being used for grape growing. The origin of the name given to the site dates back to medieval times, when the area was known as the “Casale di Capo di Bove e di Capo di Vacca” (Hamlet of the Heads of the Ox and Cow), so named after the sculptures on the nearby tomb of Caecilia Metella. The area was purchased in 1302 by Cardinal Francesco Caetani, nephew of Pope Boniface VIII. In the 17th century the area served as a hospital while in the 19th century it was under the control of the monastery at the Basilica of Saint Paul Outside the Walls.

The excavations, which can be visited daily free of charge, revealed thermal baths dating back to the middle of the 2nd century. These baths were used until at least the 4th century and were almost certainly for private use. Greek inscriptions found there remind us of the Greek origins of Herodes Atticus. There are several well-preserved mosaics and the high quality of building materials used suggest a very elegant environment with the usual rooms found in Roman baths, i.e. a caldarium (hot bath), a tepidarium (warm bath) and frigidarium (cold bath). Water was provided by two large cisterns.

The site also includes a former farmhouse converted by the previous occupant of the site into a villa. The building incorporates numerous Roman ruins into the walls, including pipes from the baths that are built into some of the windows. An internal exhibition contains photographs of the Appian Way in the first half of the 20th century.

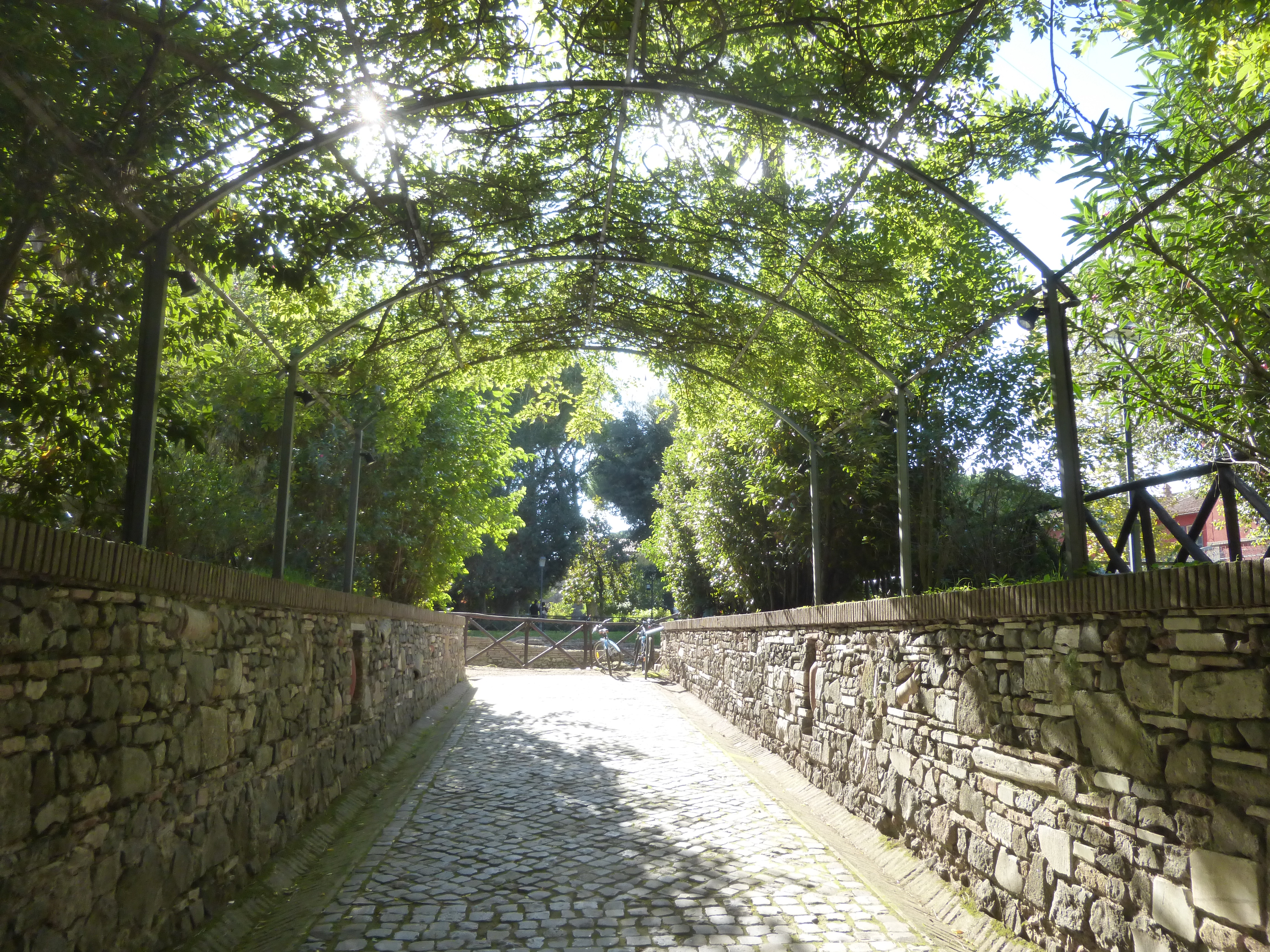
Capo di Bove entrance

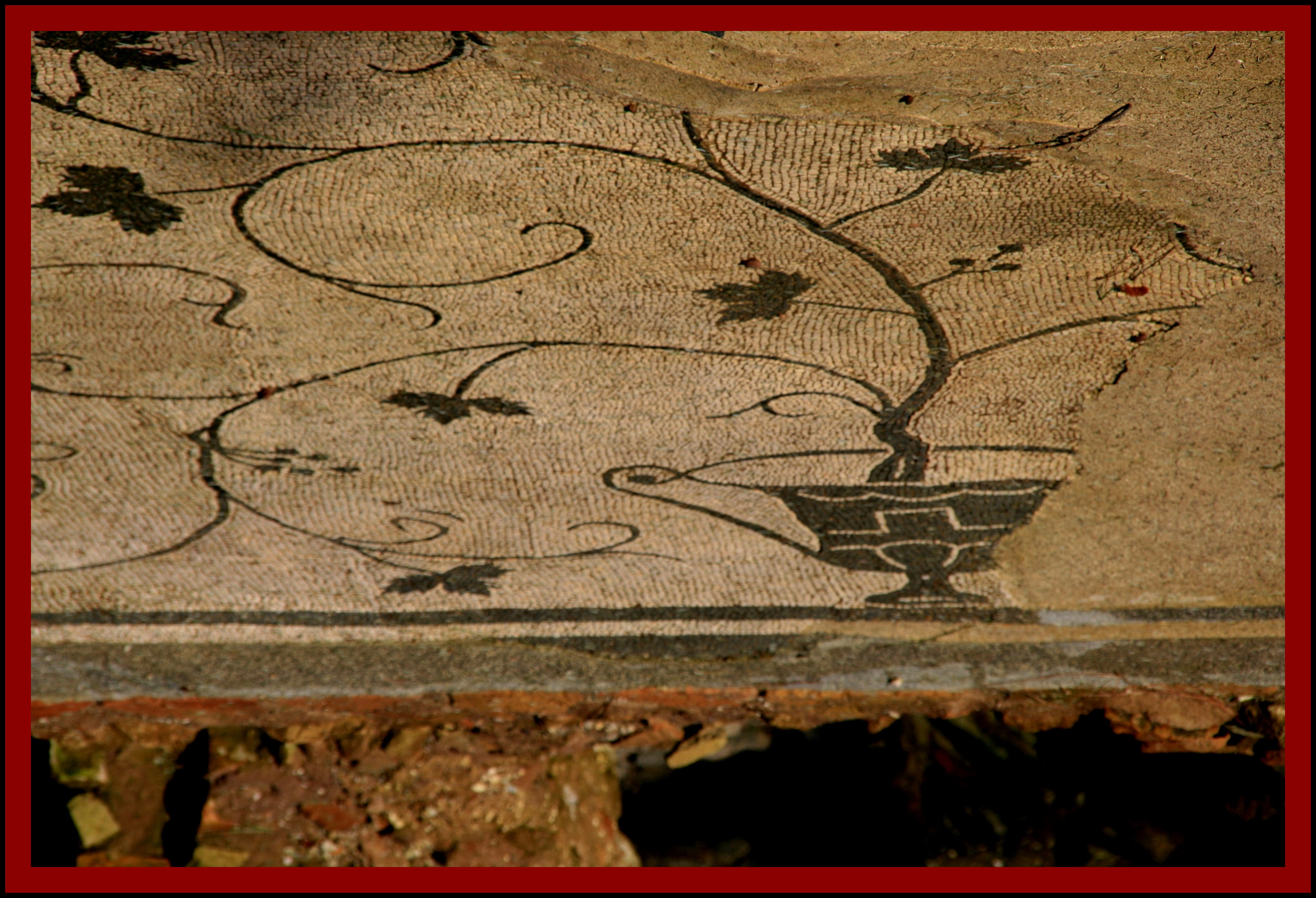
Mosaic in the baths

== See also ==
- Roman villa
- Villa of Livia
- Villa Magna
- Villa of the Quintilii
- Villa of the sette bassi
