= Archaeological Museum of Marathon =

Archaeological museum in Marathon, Attica, Greece

Coordinates: 38.1219°N 23.9467°E

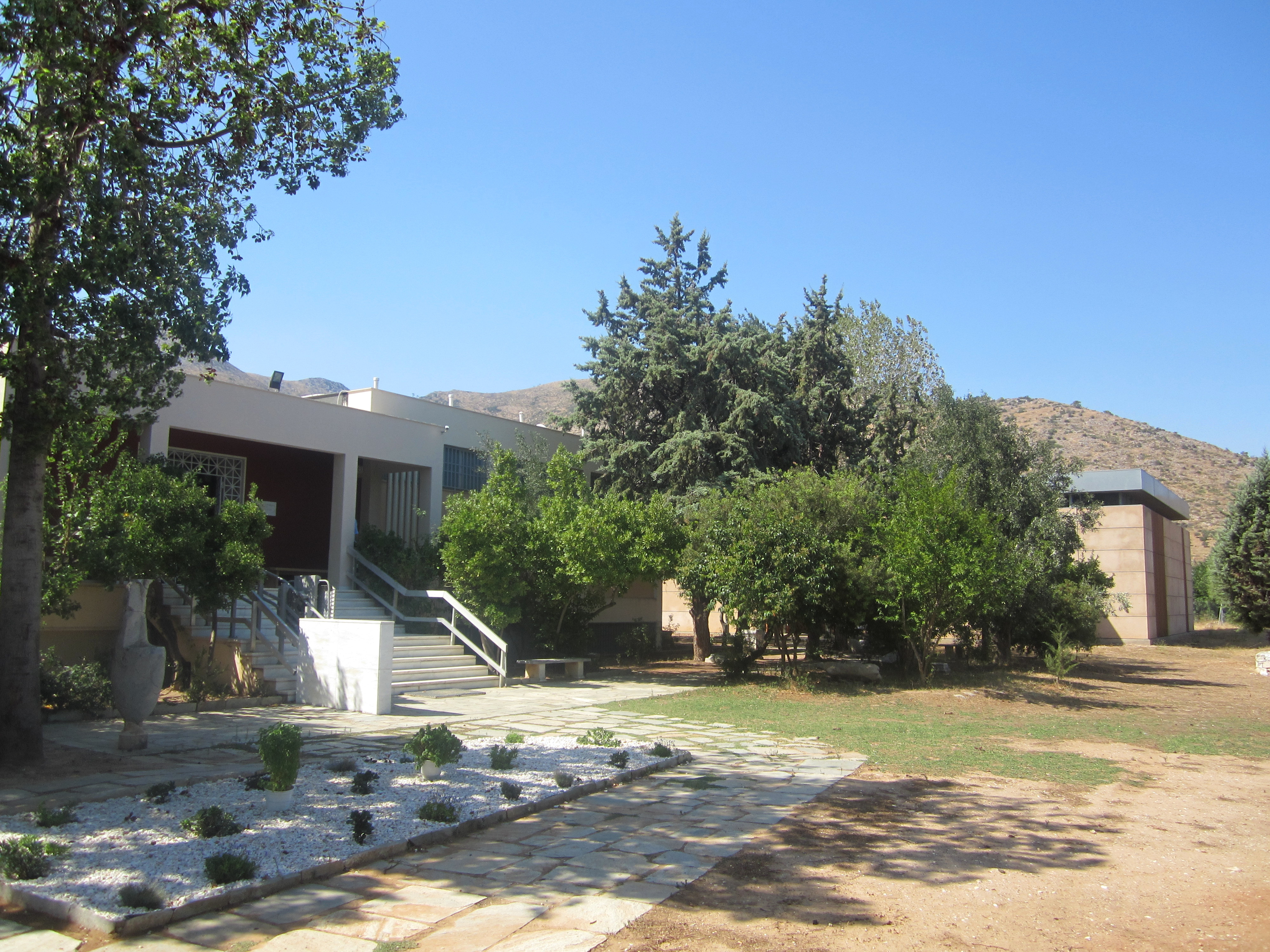
- Established: 1975
- Location: 114, Platon avenue, Varnavas, Marathon, Greece - Λ. Πλαταιών 114, Βρανάς
- Type: Archaeological

The Archeological Museum of Marathon is a museum in Marathon, Attica, Greece. The museum mainly houses findings originating from the Battle of Marathon and from the Egyptian temple built nearby.

== Gallery ==
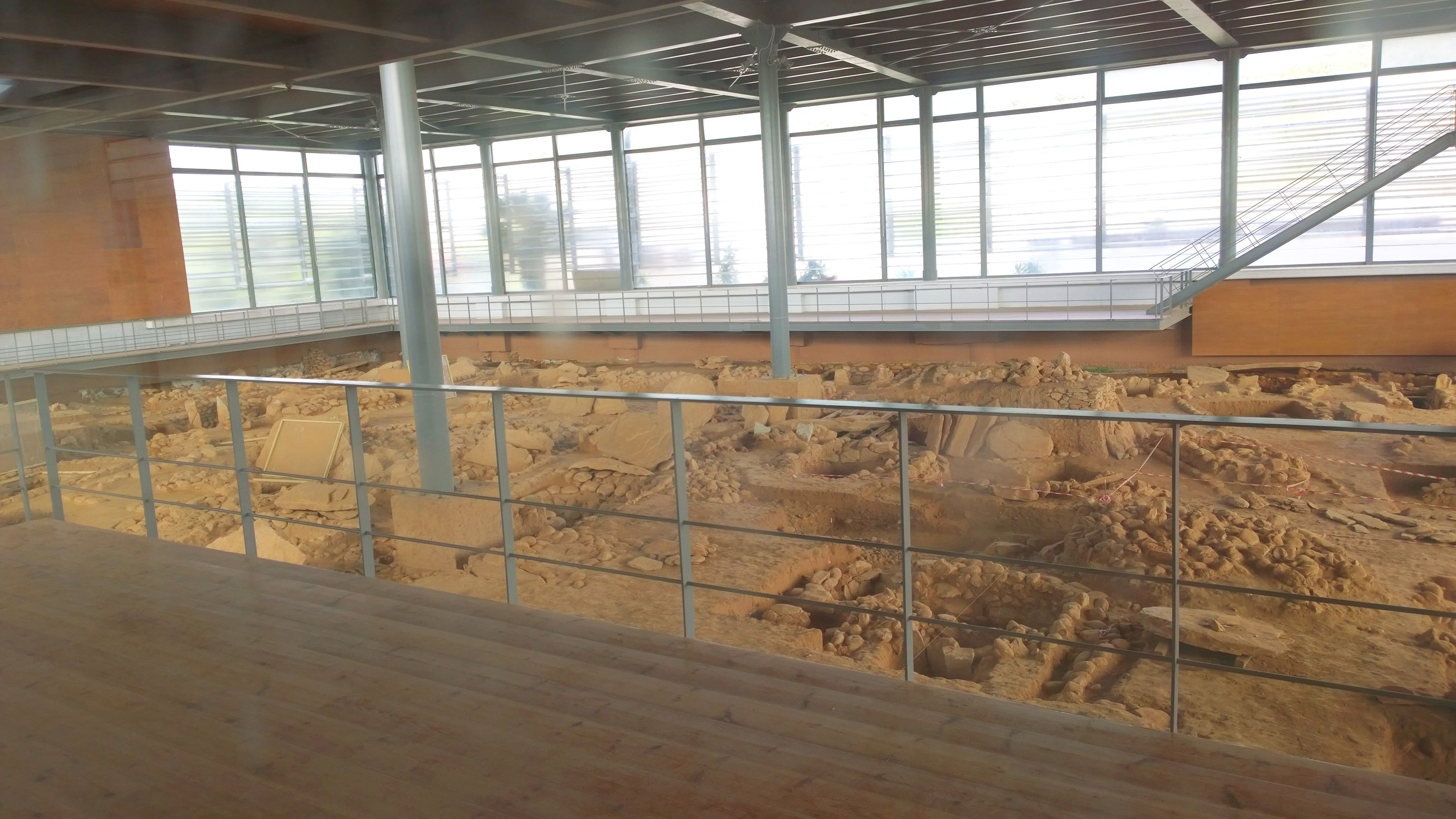
Varnavas necropoly

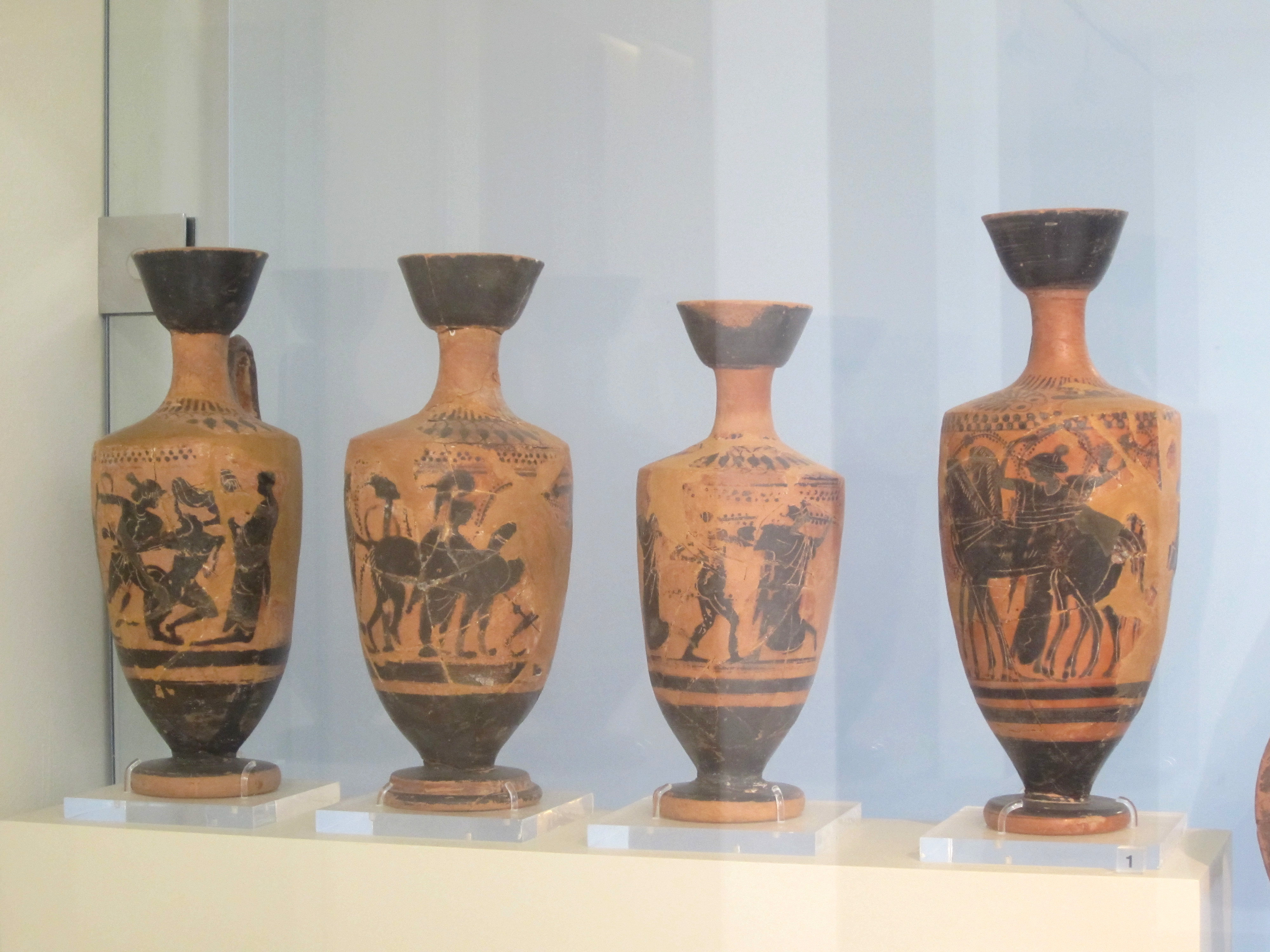
Black figure vases

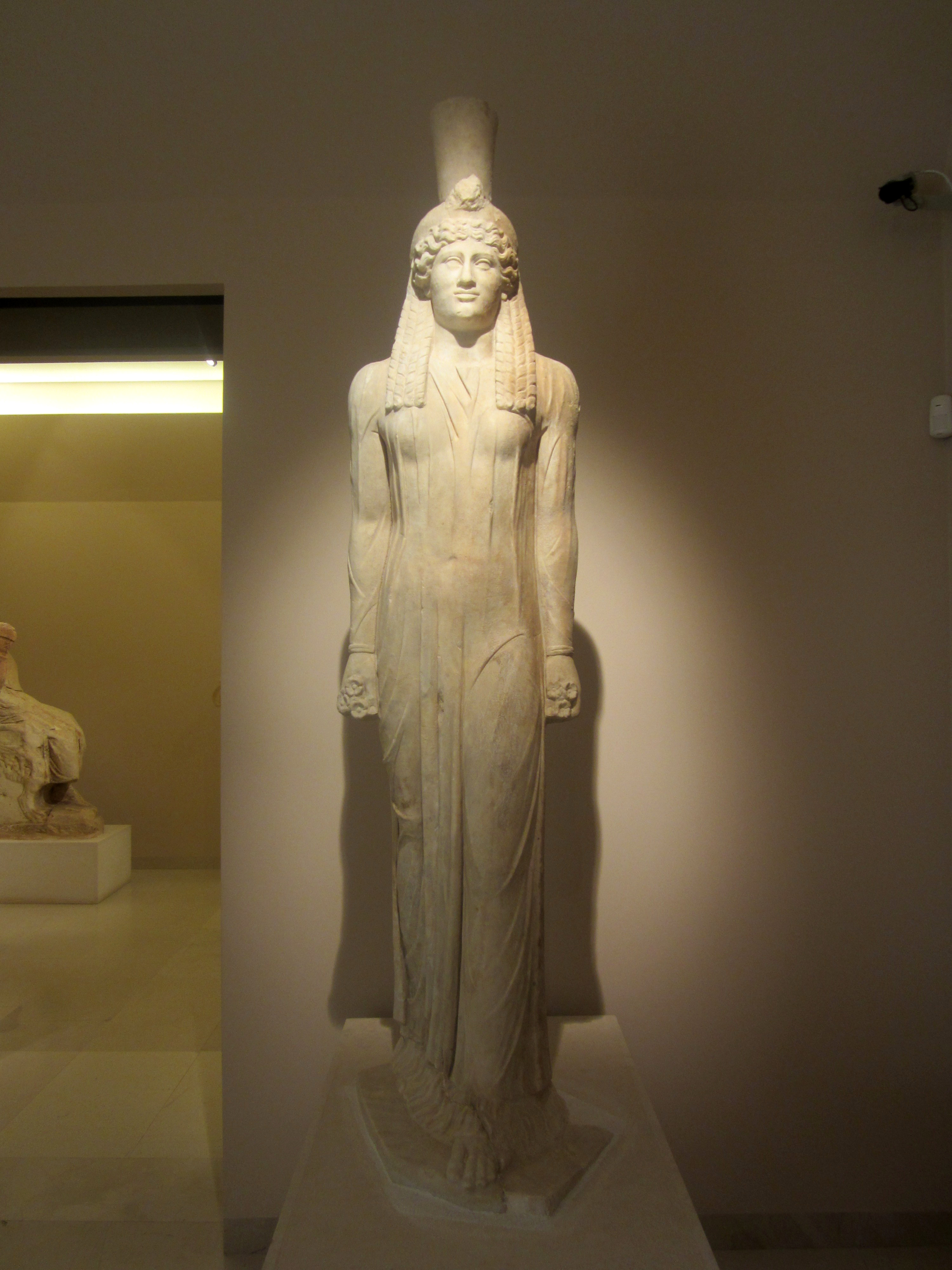
Egyptian-style statue
