= Aristocles (physician) =

Ancient Greek physician

Aristocles (/əˈrɪstəˌkliːz/; Ancient Greek: Ἀριστοκλῆς) was a physician of the ancient world whose medicines are several times quoted by one of the physicians named Andromachus. He is also mentioned in the first volume of John Cramer's Anecdota Graeca.

Nothing is known of the events of his life, but he must have lived some time in or before the first century.
