= Isthmia =

Isthmia may refer to:

- Isthmia (sanctuary) at the east side of the Isthmus of Corinth, Greece

- The ancient Isthmian Games, held at the sanctuary
- Temple of Isthmia, located in the sanctuary

- Isthmia, Corinthia, a village in the municipal unit Loutraki-Perachora, Corinthia, Greece, near ancient Isthmia
- Isthmia (genus), a genus of diatom in the Mediophyceae class
