= Aristocles of Pergamon =

Aristocles of Pergamon (/əˈrɪstəˌkliːz/; Ancient Greek: Ἀριστοκλῆς ὁ ἐκ τοῦ Περγάμου) was a sophist and rhetorician who lived in the time of the Roman emperors Trajan and Hadrian. He spent the early part of his life on the study of Peripatetic philosophy, and during this period he completely neglected his outward appearance. But afterwards he was seized by the desire of becoming a rhetorician, and went to Rome, where he enrolled himself among the pupils of Herodes Atticus. After his return to Pergamus, he made a complete change in his mode of life, and appears to have enjoyed a great reputation as a teacher of rhetoric. His declamations are praised for their perspicacity and for the purity of the Attic Greek; but they were wanting in passion and animation, and resembled philosophical discussions. In the Suda, it is ascribed to him a work on rhetoric (Ancient Greek: τέχνη ῥητορική), letters, declamations, and other subjects.
