= Aristocles of Rhodes =

Aristocles (/əˈrɪstəˌkliːz/; Ancient Greek: Ἀριστοκλῆς) of Rhodes was a grammarian, rhetorician, Platonist, and musician of Ancient Greece, who was a contemporary of Strabo. He is probably the writer whose work "On Poetics" (Ancient Greek: περὶ ποιητκῆς) is mentioned in the book "On the Differences of Synonymous Expressions" (Ancient Greek: περὶ ὁμοίων καὶ διαφόρων λέξεων), which was traditionally attributed to Ammonius Grammaticus, but which scholars since the 19th century have begun to believe was actually written by Philo of Byblos.

There are several other grammatical and historical works that are only ascribed to "Aristocles" and which some writers over the years have ascribed or suspected were the works of this Aristocles but it is ambiguous whether Aristocles of Rhodes, specifically, was intended as the writer, or some other Aristocles was meant:

- "On Plato's Dialogues" (Ancient Greek: περὶ διαλέκτου)
- "The Spartan State" (Ancient Greek: Λακῶνων πολιτεία)
- An unnamed work on the history of Italy

Aristocles of Rhodes was also at times described as the author of the (lost) dialogue Magikos—principally by late 19th century scholar Valentin Rose—which has elsewhere variously been attributed to Aristotle and others, but most scholars consider this extremely unlikely.

Similarly, in the 4th century, the philosopher Proclus mentions an Aristocles who wrote a work on Plato's Timaeus, and elsewhere talks about a "philosopher from Rhodes", and scholars are divided over whether Aristocles of Rhodes is meant here or whether it is first century philosopher Aristocles of Messene.
