= Temples of Cybele in Rome =

Temple of Cybele

A number of temples to Cybele in Rome have been identified. Originally an Anatolian mother goddess, the cult of Cybele was formally brought to Rome during the Second Punic War (218 to 201 BCE) after a consultation with the Sibylline Books.

== Circus Maximus ==
A shrine of Cybele in the Circus Maximus is mentioned in the Notitia (Reg. XI), and by Tertullian. The reliefs representing the circus and a mosaic at Barcelona, represent Cybele sitting on a lion on the spina of the circus, just east of its centre.

== Almo ==
Annually, on 27 March, the sacred black stone of the Magna Mater was brought from her temple on the Palatine to where the brook of the Almo (now called the Acquataccio) crossed the via Appia south of the Porta Capena, for the ceremony of "Lavatio" (washing). Although there are numerous references to this ceremony, it seems to have constituted a "locus sacratus" or sacred place rather than a permanent building, in view of the lack of archaeological evidence for it.

== Sacra Via ==
A tholos, adorned with frescoes, is at the top of the Sacra via, where the Clivus Palatinus branched off to the south. Its approximate site is also probably indicated by the Haterii relief on which, to the immediate left of the arch of Titus, is a statue of the Magna Mater seated under an arch at the top of a flight of thirteen steps. Spano believes the arch to be a Janus erected at the four cross-roads near the meta sudans – perhaps on or near the site of the arch of Constantine. He does not even quote the passage of Martial. A passage in Cass. Dio is generally supposed to refer to this temple.

== Vatican Hill ==
A shrine was located on the right bank of the River Tiber, near the racecourse of Caligula (Gaianum), known from several inscriptions on fragmentary marble altars, dating from 305 to 390 CE, all but one of which were found under the façade of S. Peter's in 1609. This shrine is probably the Frigianum (Phrygianum) of the Not. Given that an inscription on an altar at Lyon of the time of Hadrian refers to this shrine, it would indicate that this was an important religious centre.

== See also ==
- List of Ancient Roman temples

== Sources ==
- Cicero De Natura Deorum III.52; Ovid Fasti IV.337‑340;
- Mart. III.47.2; Stat. Silv. V.1.222;
- Lucan I.600; Sil. Ital. VIII.363;
- Ammian. XXIII.3.7; Vib. Sequester 2;1 Fast. Philoc. ad VI Kal. Apr., CIL I2 pp260, 314;
- Pol. Silv. Fast. Rust. ib. p261;
- ib. VI.10098 =33961 = Carm. epig. 1110;
- Prud. Peristeph. X.160; HJ 215.
