= Almo (god) =

Ancient Roman river god

Almo was in ancient Roman religion the eponymous god of the small river Almo, a tributary of the Tiber in the vicinity of Rome.

The river god Almo itself, though identified by the river which carries its name in the modern day, has been identified with the streams Aquataccio, the Marrana della Caffarella, and Acquasanta.

Not much is known about the worship of Almo, but, like other river gods, his importance was bound to his connection to the rivers and waterways. Like Tiberinus and other river gods, he was prayed to and his name invoked by the augura of Rome, as rivers were seen as sacred limits, and integral to auspicial practices.

Aside from this, many river gods' importance was often in connection with other more prominent deities. So too was the case with Almo, in the water of Almo; where it adjoins the Tiber, the aniconic stone embodying the mother of the gods, Cybele, used to be washed annually. This was due to the fact that the river Almo was considered the sacred limit of Roman territory in the archaic era. The goddess' journey from abroad to the Roman territory was thereby recreated by bringing the idol to the edge of the Roman territory and back again.

A grotto located in the Park of the Caffarella, more commonly known as "the nymphaeum of Egeria" (Italian: Ninfeo di Egeria), which was the river's source, is said to have contained a statue (and a fountain) representing the river god Almo in a recumbent pose in a niche in the grotto's wall. The water was used exclusively by the vestal virgins in their rites. It is thought to have been constructed as a part of the villa estate of Herodicus Atticus in the 2nd century. The presence of such a place suggests that Almo had some importance to the region and was the subject of local worship by the inhabitants of the area.

A small building called the Tempio Dio Redicolo (English: Temple of the Returning God) was historically thought to have been consecrated as a temple to the river god, but constructed as a cenotaph for the wife of Herodes Atticus, the Roman noblewoman Appia Annia Regilla. The closeness of the building to the banks of the Almo does not, however, rule out that the location might have been chosen due to the importance attached to the river and its genius loci.

Not much is known about the minor river god, but his appearance in several texts described him as handsome and his personality as heroic or fatherly.

Though the myths about Almo are scarce, he figures in Ovid’s Fasti, where Almo is said to be giving advice to his loqaucious naidad daughter Lara (or Lala) to not gossip around what she hears. Lara disobeyed her fathers admonishment and revealed Jupiter's affair with Juturna to his wife Juno, for which she was punished with muteness by Jupiter. Through his daughter's later rape by the god Mercury, Almo was the grandfather of the household deities the Lares Praestites.

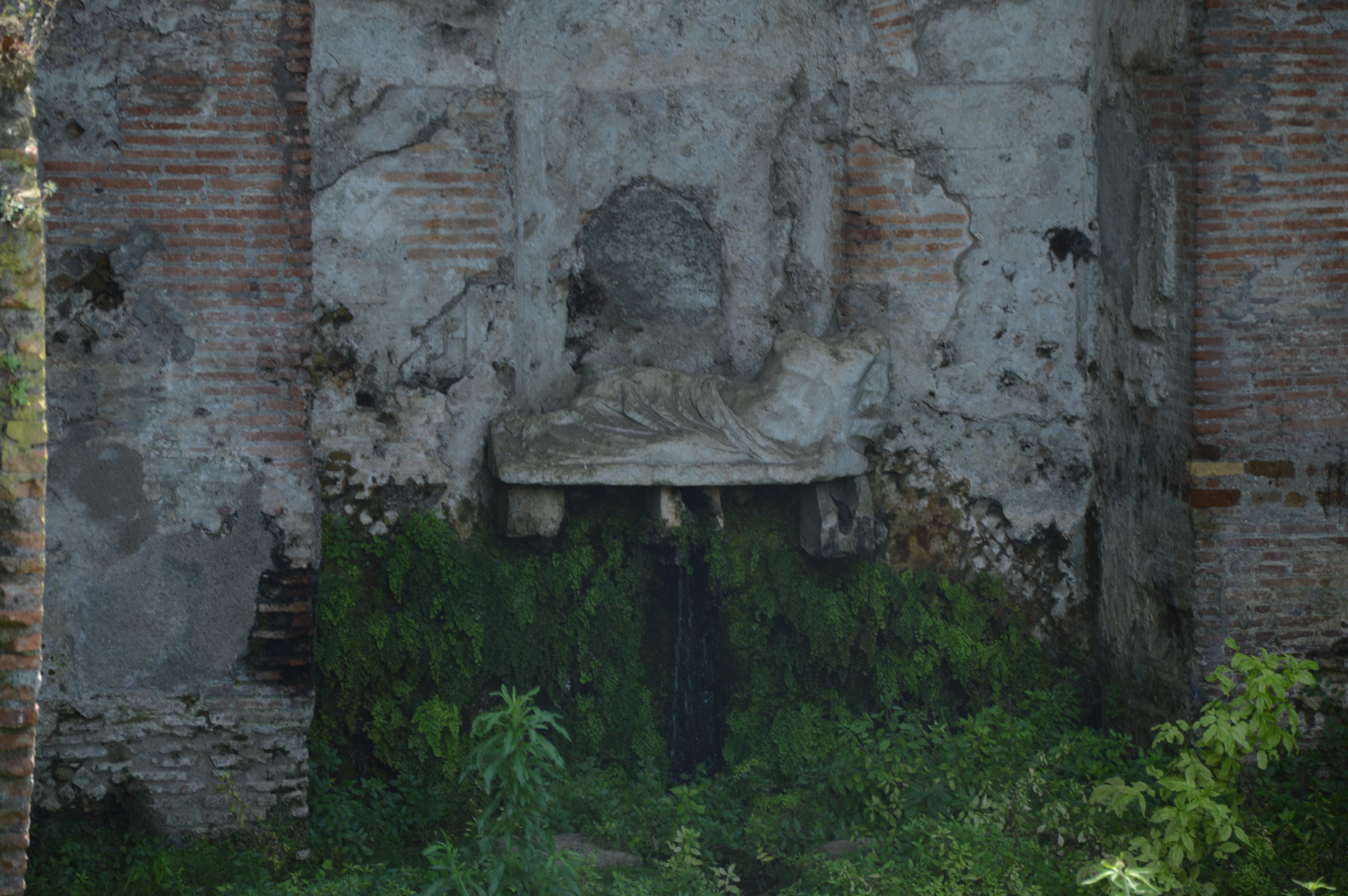
Grotto of Egeria at Park of Caffarella with statue

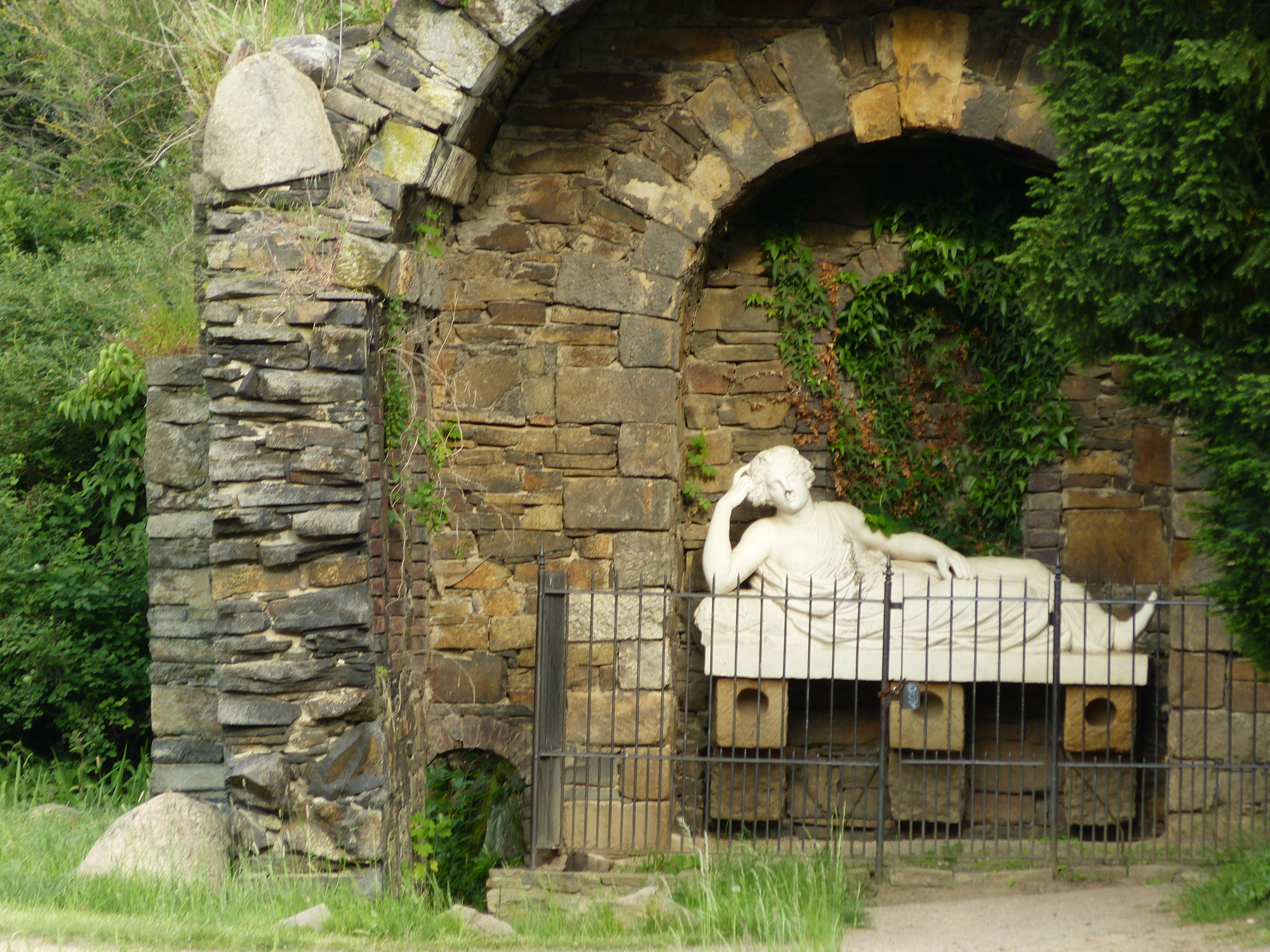
A recreation of the nyphaeum of Egeria with reclining god in the Dessauer-Wörlitz park

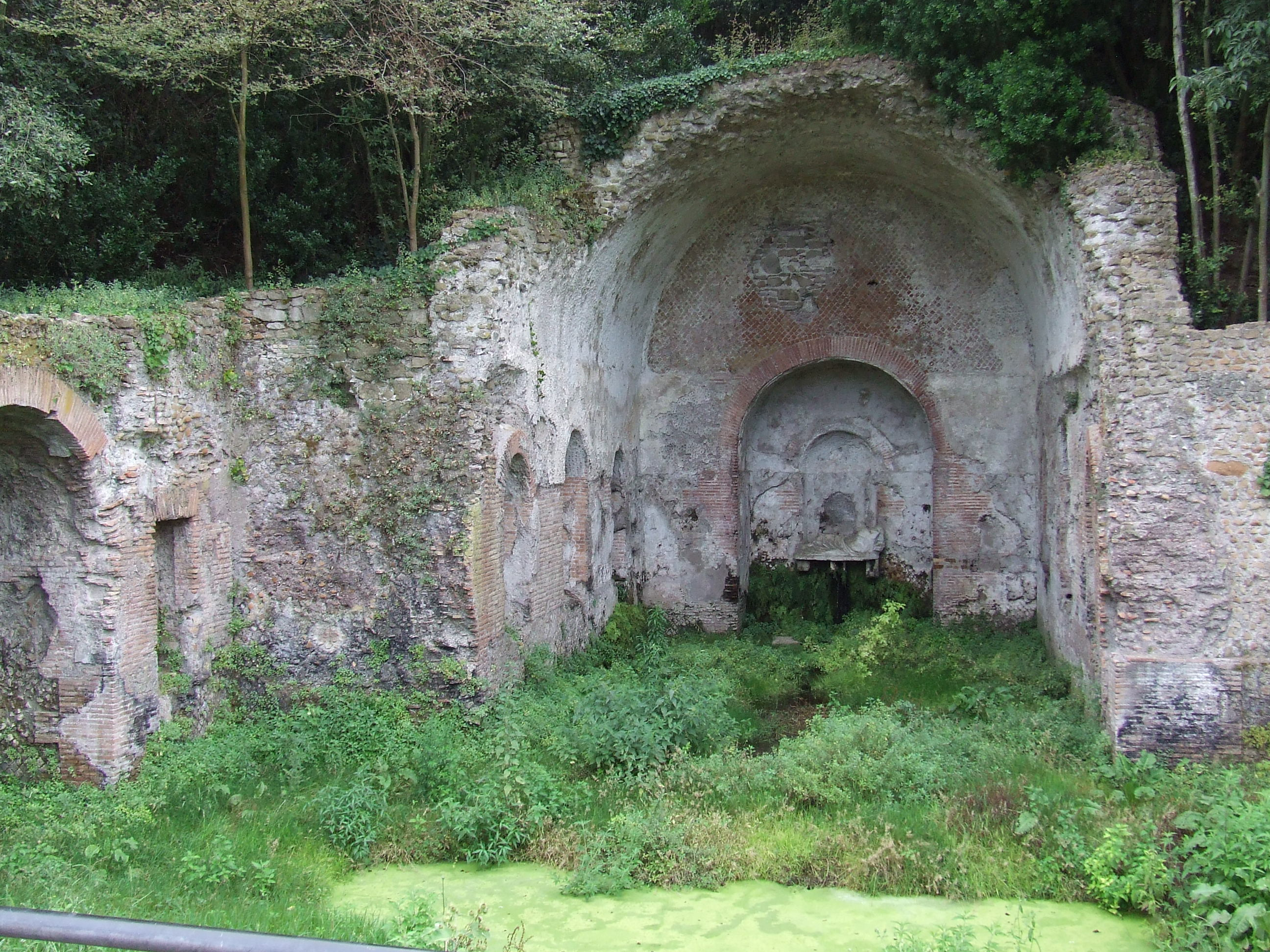
