= Sant'Urbano alla Caffarella, Rome =

Unused church in Rome built on site of former Roman temple

Sant'Urbano alla Caffarella
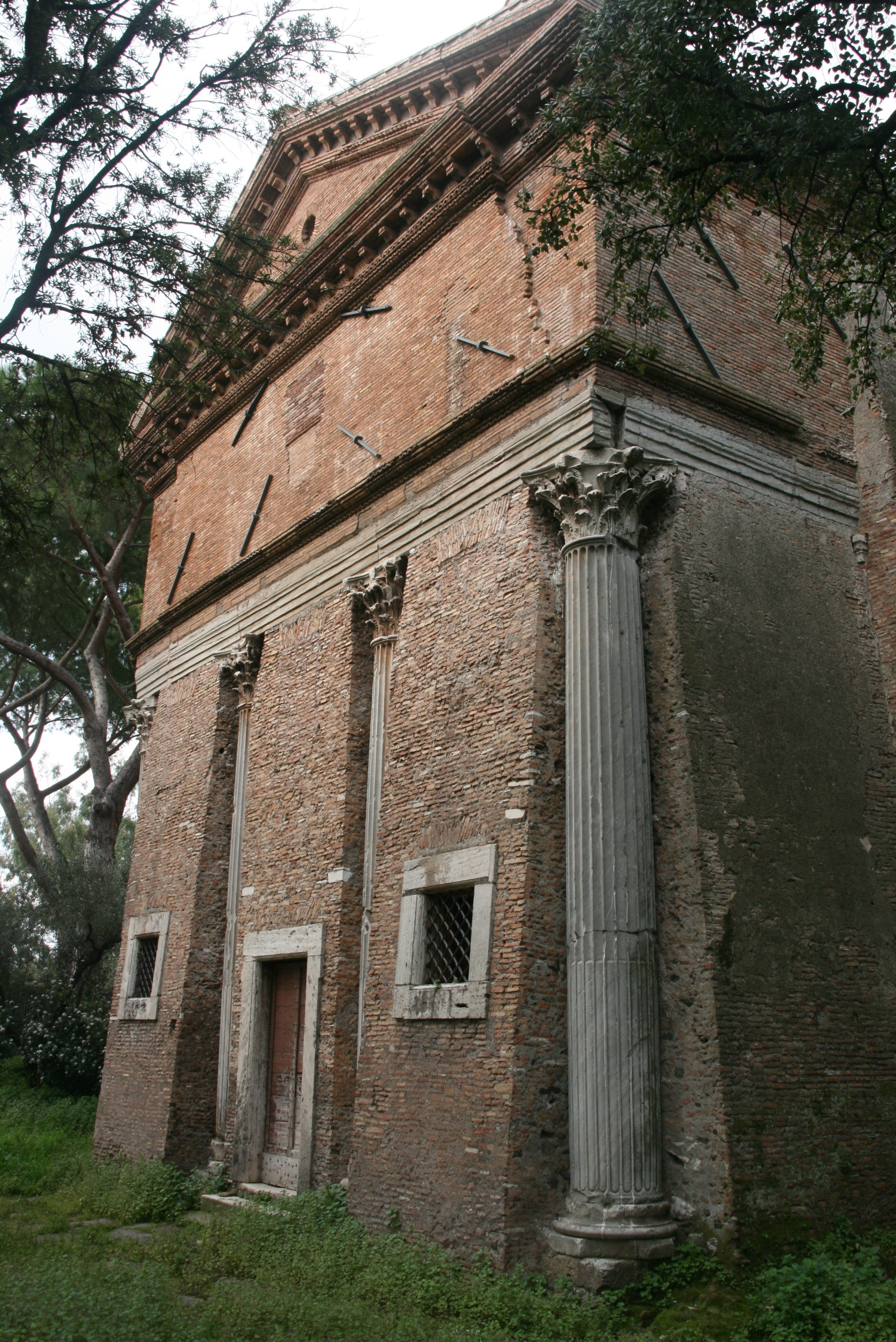
- Front view of Sant'Urbano
- Click on the map for a fullscreen view
- 41°51′28″N 12°31′28″E
- Location: Edge of the Caffarella Park, Rome
- Country: Italy

History
- Consecrated: 10th century

Architecture
- Architectural type: Church

The church of Sant'Urbano alla Caffarella is found on the edge of the Caffarella Park in the southeast of Rome. It was originally a Roman temple. In the 10th century, the structure was modified and consecrated as a church and it was extensively altered in the 17th century.

== History ==
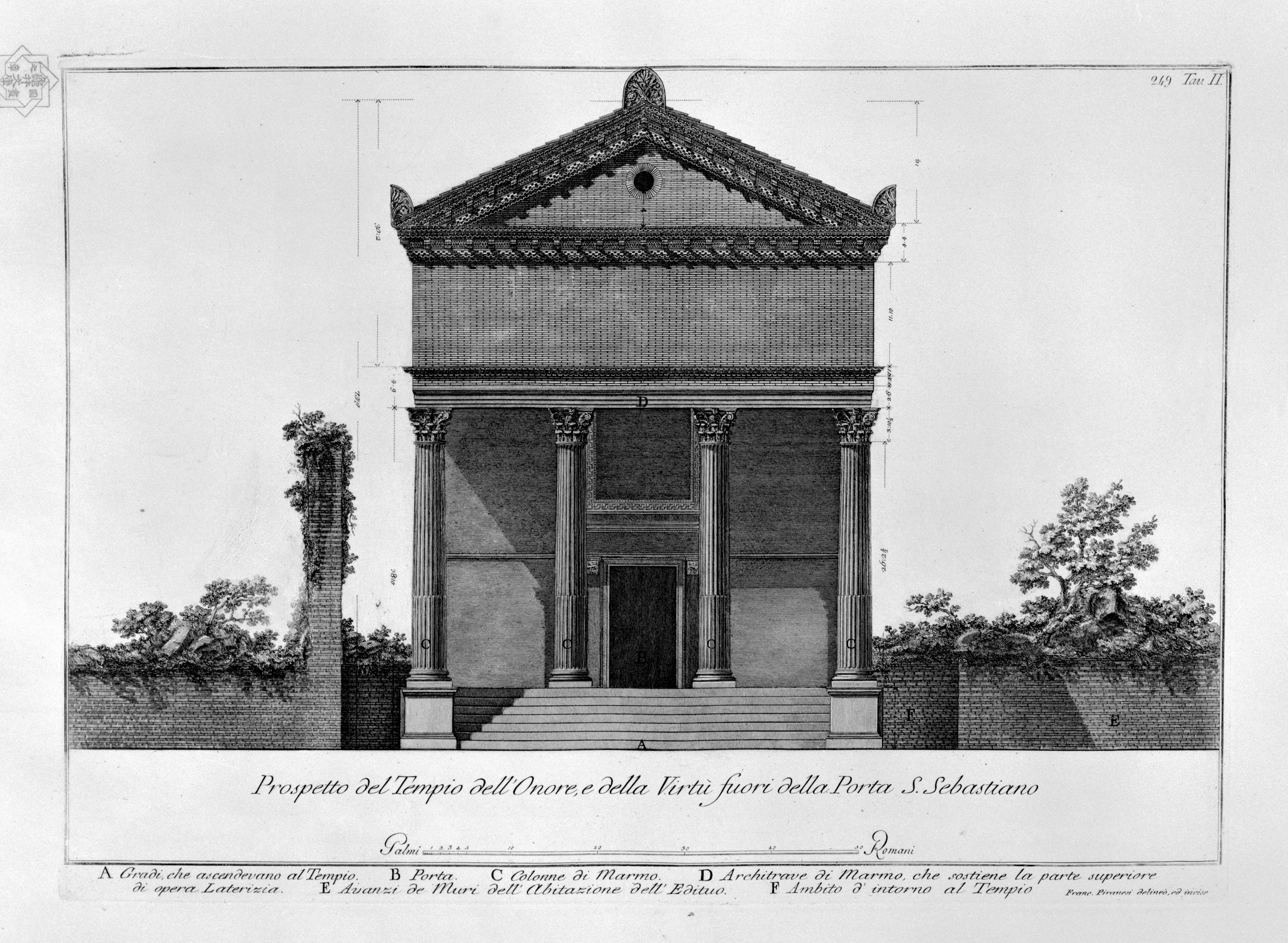
Reconstruction of the original appearance of the façade

The original construction on the site was a pagan temple or perhaps a tomb from around 160 AD. It is thought to have been dedicated to Ceres and Faustina, wife of Antoninus Pius, although one early historian, Pompilio Totti, believed that it was dedicated to Bacchus. The site lies on land that was formerly part of the Triopio, an estate owned by the Roman senator of Greek origin, Herodes Atticus and his wife Aspasia Annia Regilla. It is thought that the temple was also dedicated to her by her husband after her death at the hands of one of his freed slaves.

The church was built inside the temple in the 10th century and was dedicated to St. Urban who was pope from 222 to 230. Internal frescoes were added in the 12th century. Often abandoned, the church was eventually restored by Pope Urban VIII and his nephew Cardinal Francesco Barberini, beginning in 1634. Cardinal Francesco Maria Del Monte, an influential patron of the artist Caravaggio Michelangelo Merisi da Caravaggio, was buried there. The columns at the front are in marble bought from Greece by Herodes Atticus. They originally formed part of a portico but walls between them were added during this renovation in order to provide stability.

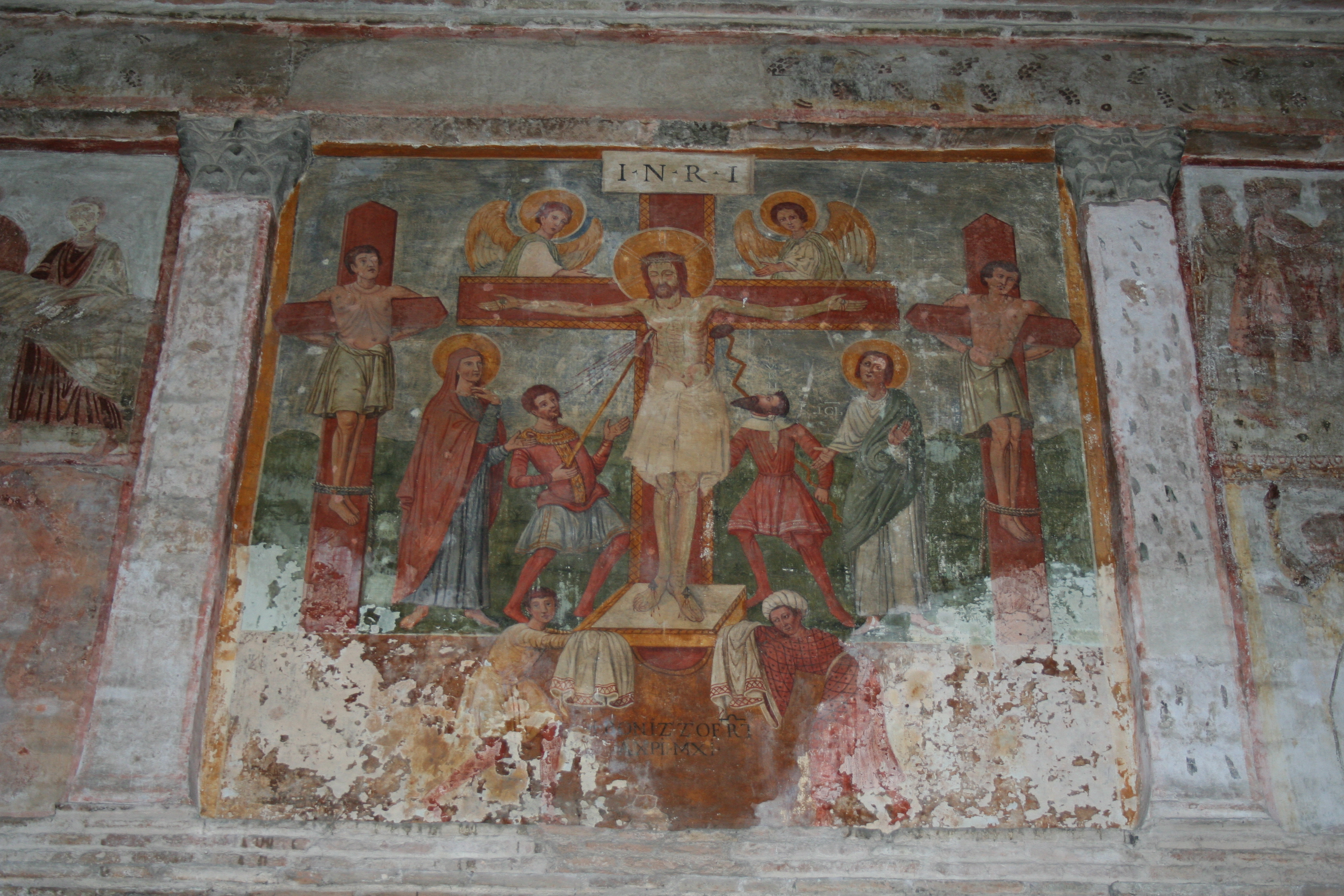
Interior fresco showing crucifixion of Christ

Even after the renovation, the church's remote position meant that it was often subject to vandalism and it was eventually abandoned. In 1962 it was annexed by the owner of the neighboring property. The building was acquired by the city of Rome in 2002 and given to the Diocese of Rome and now serves as a rectory in the parish of San Sebastiano fuori le mura. It underwent restoration in 2010–11. Open to the public only on Sunday mornings prior to restoration, it was still closed to the public in late 2015, with the exception of occasional guided tours.

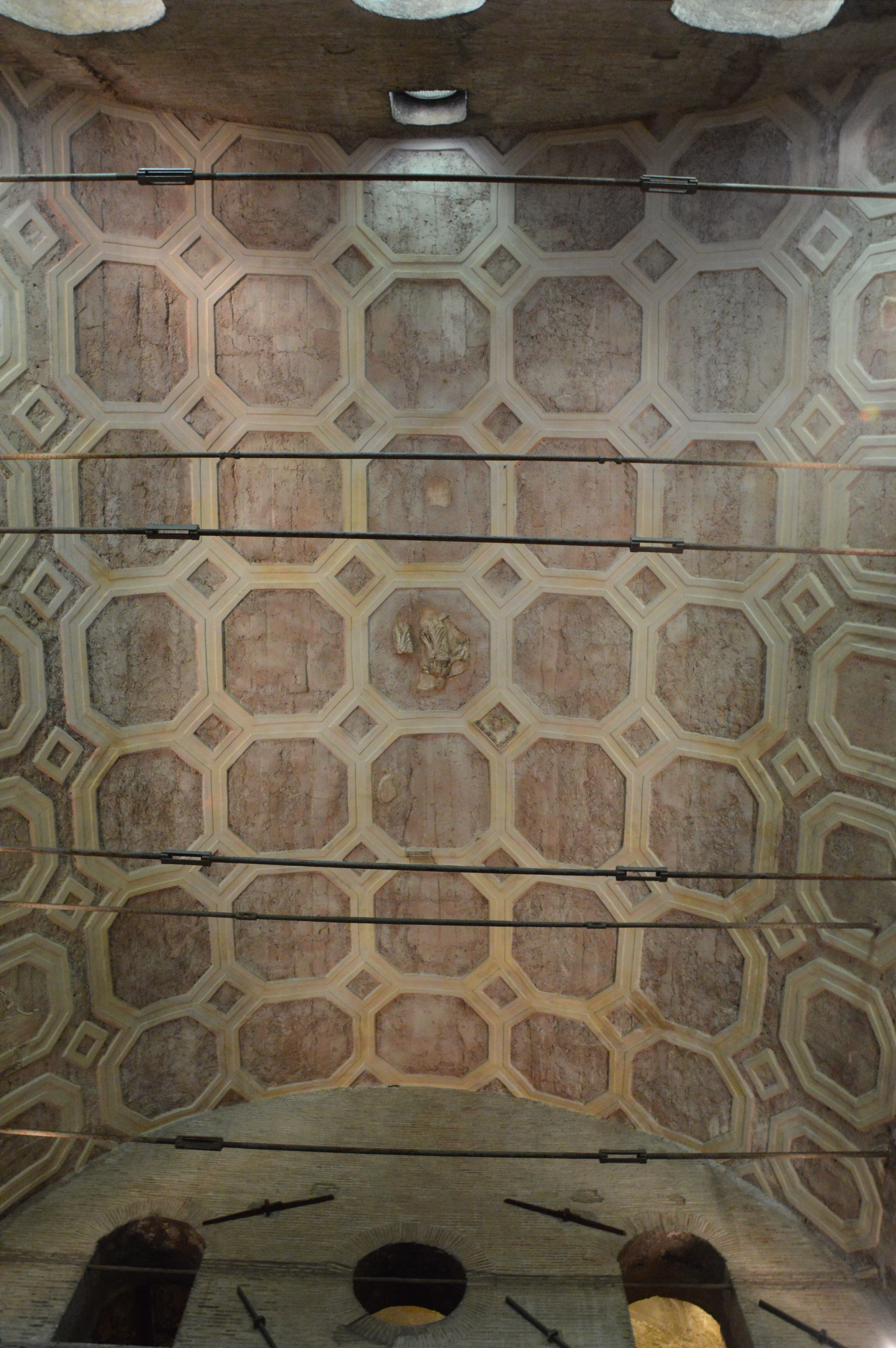
cement ceiling including an element of original painting and stonework
