= Almone =

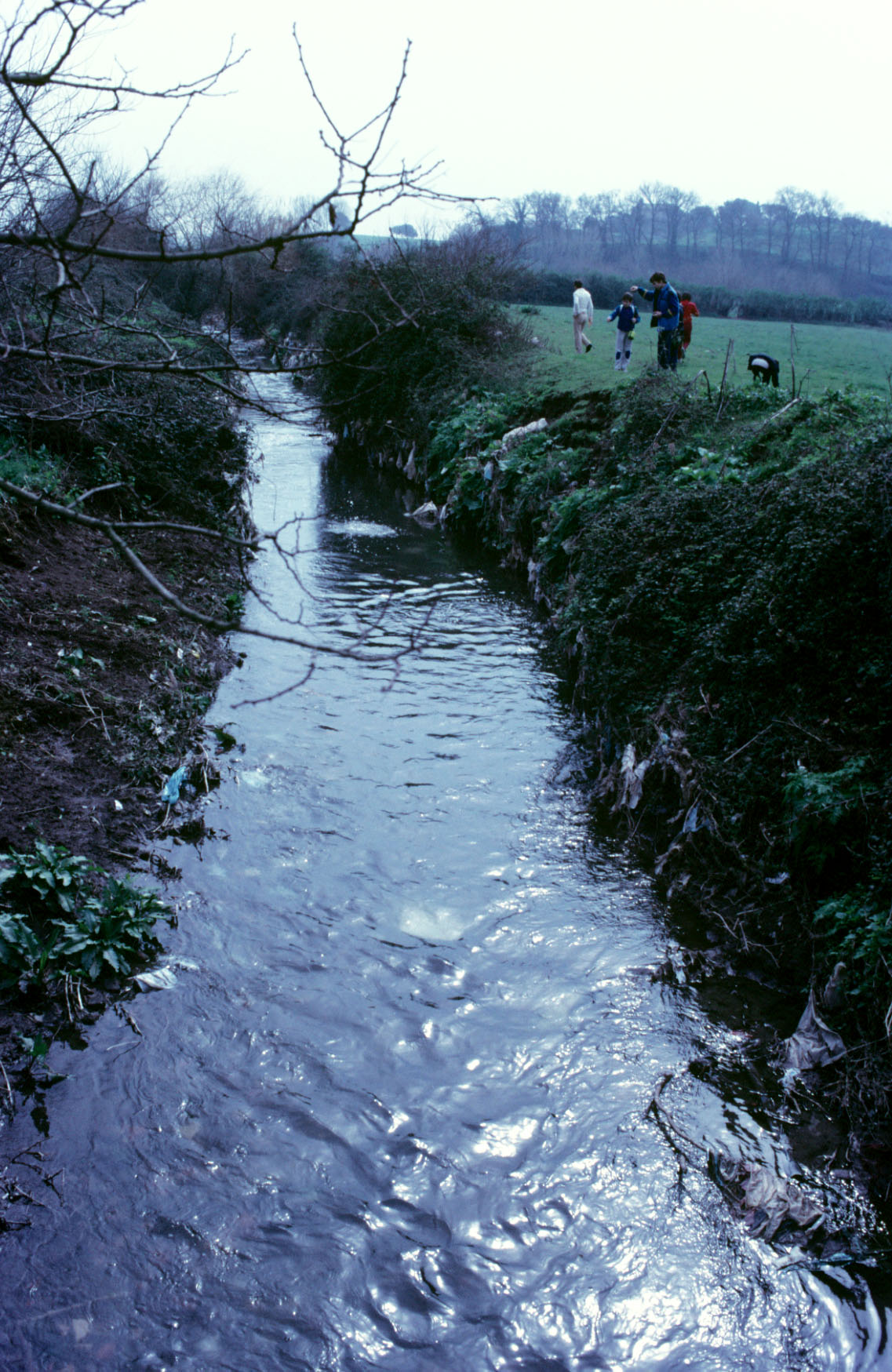
- The Almone where it flows through the Park of the Caffarella

Location
- Country: Italy

Physical characteristics
- Mouth: Tiber
  - coordinates: 41.8662°N 12.4765°E

Basin features
- Progression: Tiber→ Tyrrhenian Sea

The Almone (Latin: Almo) is a small river of the Ager Romanus, a few miles south of the city of Rome. Today the river is polluted and is channelled to a sewage treatment plant and no longer reaches its natural confluence with the Tiber.

== Name ==
The Latin name of the Almone, Almo (also the name of its corresponding deity), is derived from the Latin word almus, meaning "fertile" or "nourishing," which may derive from its connection to Cybele, also known as Magna Mater ("Great Mother").

Since medieval times the stream has been called Marrana della Caffarella. Marrana (or marana in Roman dialect) is a term that derives from the name of the ancient ager maranus, the fields that surround the Via Appia, and refers to the drainage channels that flow through the countryside near Rome. "Caffarella" refers to the valley, now a park, that the river runs through. The river has also been known as Acquataccio, a name with two possible derivations. It either refers to the nearby Appian Way, a corruption of Acqua d'Appia (which became d'Accia), or the suffix -accio is to be taken in its pejorative sense, and it refers to the marshy waters of the Caffarella valley.

== Origin, course, and diversion ==
The Almone originates in the Alban Hills from springs fed by the water of Lake Albano, (Note: According to Antonio Nibby, the water derives its source from the confluence of the Ferentine waters (Caput Aquae Ferentinum), which come from the area near Marino through the emissary of Lake Nemi.) and runs through the Appian Way Regional Park, fed by the waters of the numerous springs present in the area, including the so-called Acqua Santa ("Holy Water") of the Fonte Egeria. There, the Via Ostiensis crossed the river with a bridge known as the Travicella.

In the second century, the river was used to provide water for the luxurious gardens of the villa called Triopio of Herodes Atticus, erected on land brought to him by his wife, Aspasia Annia Regilla, and centuries after Rome's fall it was employed for agricultural purposes: to irrigate fields, to water cattle, and to move millstones. The final stretch of the river flowed where the present-day Circonvallazione Ostiense in the Garbatella neighborhood lies. The Almone began to be used for industrial purposes in the early years of the twentieth century, when its waters were diverted to feed a paper mill on the Appian Way, but its decline accelerated in the 1920s, when its final course into the Tiber was covered over to allow the construction of the Rome-Lido railway, and also to provide water to the former thermal power plant on the Via Ostiense.

Pollution of the stream has made it such that today, its waters are entirely channeled into the Magliana sewage treatment plant and no longer reach the Tiber at all. It is diverted as soon as it runs under the Via Appia Antica, near Parco Scott, in back of the Piazza dei Navigatori. The closest landmark to the place where it formerly emptied into the Tiber is the large Gazometro. (Note: See this area: 41°52′10″N 12°28′29″E.)

== In antiquity ==
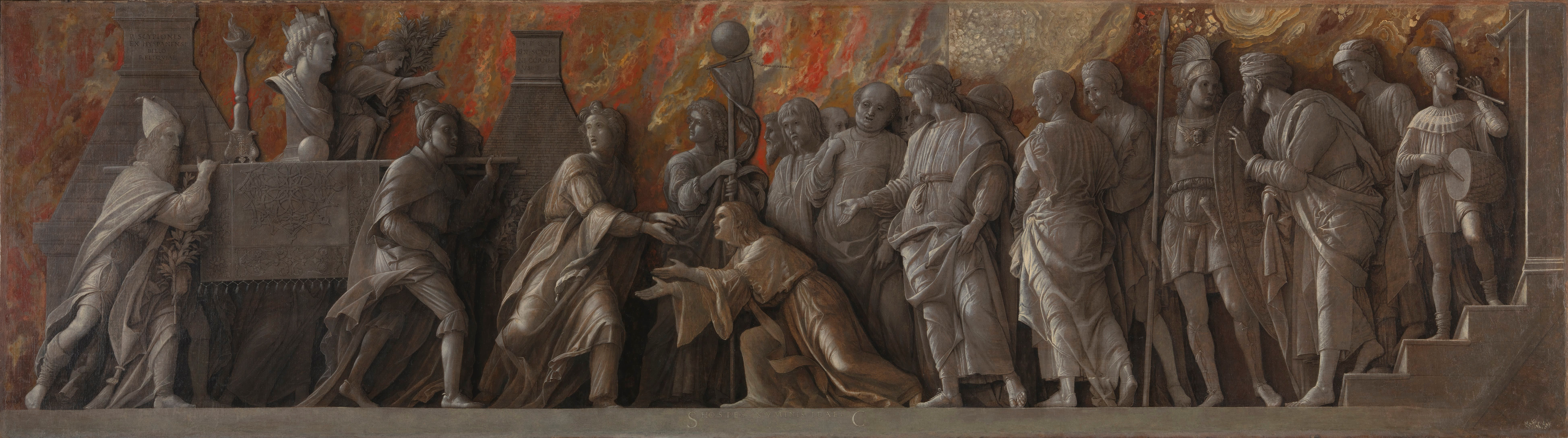
The Almone was deeply connected to the arrival of the cult of Cybele to the city of Rome, and played a central role in the city's observance of its rituals. (Andrea Mantegna, Introduction of the Cult of Cybele to Rome, 1505–1506.)

=== Cult of Cybele ===
The Almone's importance in Roman times was linked to the annual festival of the lavatio (ceremonial washing) of the sacred stone of the Phrygian goddess Cybele, which was held on March 27, the dies sanguinis, "day of blood". The sacred black stone, which was identified with the goddess herself, was taken in procession from its temple on the Palatine Hill, through the Porta Capena, and down the Appian Way to the Almone. There it was washed, along with the sacrificial knives pertaining to the deity's cult, at the place where the Almone flowed into the Tiber. The priestly college of the quindecimviri attended the lavatio ceremony, and the return trip was made with great festivity.

The choice of the Almone for this ceremony was inspired by events supposedly surrounding the arrival of the cult of Cybele to the city. The sacred stone was brought to Rome in 204 BC, during the Second Punic War, upon the recommendation of the Sibylline Books. While the ship bearing the stone was navigating the Tiber, it became beached near the area where the Almone flowed into the larger river. The ship was able to sail again only after a ritual of purification was completed. The ceremony therefore alluded to, even if it did not reenact, Cybele's original arrival in the city.

Based on the discovery of a small tuff basin in the Temple of Magna Mater on the Palatine, some have hypothesized that the ritual bathing of the black stone originally occurred there, and that its annual journey to the Almone was only begun during the reign of Augustus. Whatever the case, there is evidence for some kind of shrine connected to Cybele on the Almone, although it seems to have been closer to the Via Appia than the place where the stream flowed into the Tiber.

The lavatio was carried out until AD 389, when pagan rites were abolished in favor of Christianity.

=== In classical literature ===
Hic iuvenis primam ante aciem stridente sagitta,
natorum Tyrrhi fuerat qui maximus, Almo,
sternitur; haesit enim sub gutture volnus et udae
vocis iter tenuemque inclusit sanguine vitam.

— Virgil, Aeneid VII, 531–534 (Note: "First Almon falls, old Tyrrheus' eldest care, / Pierc'd with an arrow from the distant war: / Fix'd in his throat the flying weapon stood, / And stopp'd his breath, and drank his vital blood" (John Dryden).)

The stream lends its name to one of the heroes in Virgil's Aeneid, the eldest son of Tyrrhus and one of the first casualties of the war between the Trojans and the Latins in Book VII.

Cicero, in his treatise De Natura Deorum, names the Almo as one of the local rivers and streams invoked by the Roman augurs. (Note: "But if the earth is divine, so too is the sea, which you identified with Neptune, and so, therefore, are the rivers and springs. That is why Maso dedicated a shrine of Fons from his Corsican spoils, and why we see the Tiber, the Spino, the Almo, the Nodinus, and other names belonging to neighbouring streams, in the litany of the augurs" (De natura deorum III, 20).)

== Notes and references ==
Notes
