= Arch of Domitian =

Ancient Roman arch

The Arch of Domitian (Latin: Arcus Domitiani) was an ancient Roman arch located between the Roman Forum and the Palatine Hill.

This arch was one of only two known arches erected by the emperor Domitian that was not pulled down following his Damnatio memoriae (the other being his rebuilding of the pre-existing Porta Carmentalis). The arch was located on the Clivus Palatinus, and it stood before the entrance to the forecourt of the Flavian Palace, where it formed the boundary marker between the city's public space and the emperor's private property.

Along with the Clivus Palatinus, the arch was substantially modified during the reign of the emperor Trajan. Only the arch's footings have survived.
