= Park of the Caffarella =

Large park to the southeast of Rome, Italy

Coordinates: 41°51′51″N 12°30′57″E

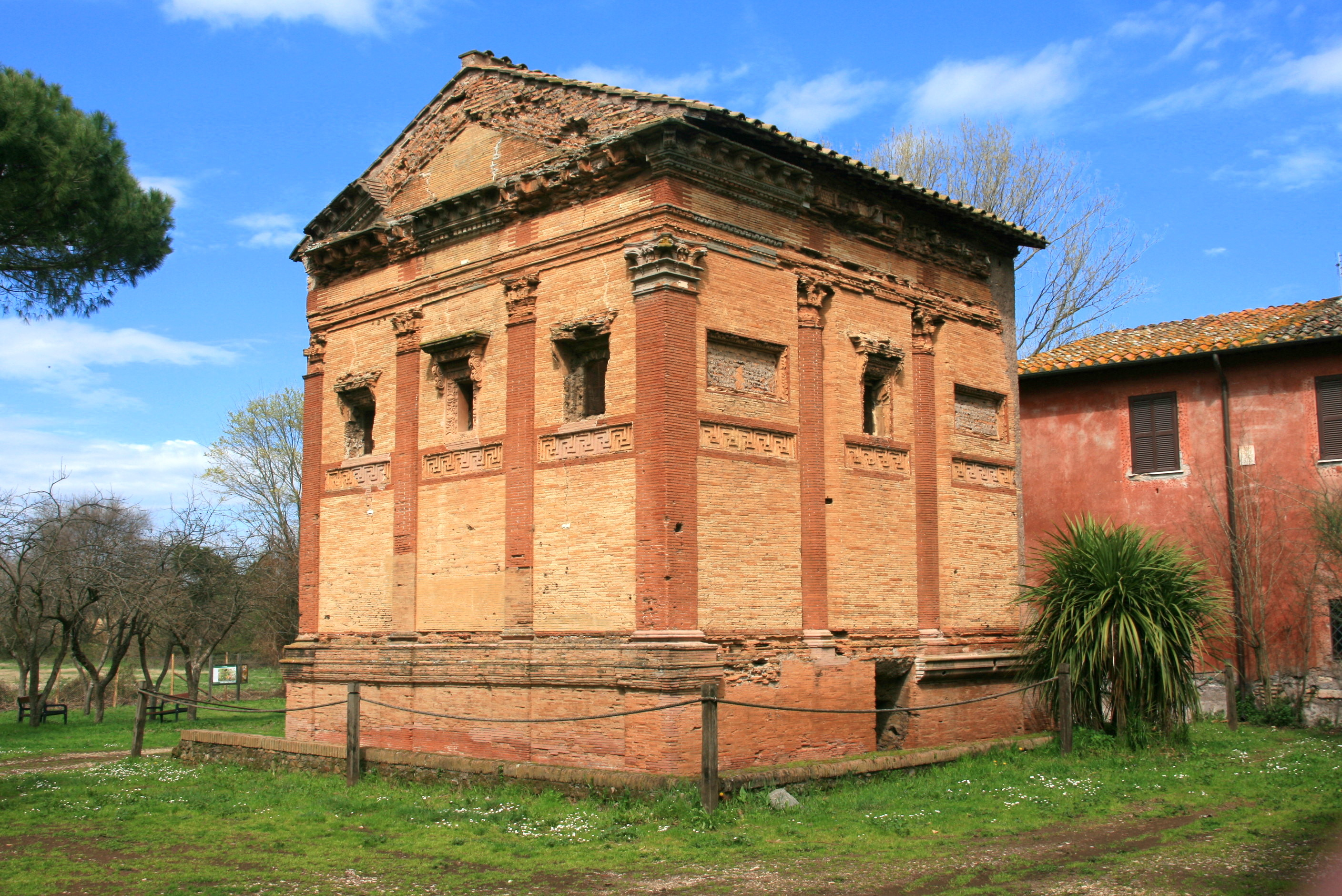
"Tomb of Annia Regilla"

The Caffarella Park (Italian: Parco della Caffarella) is a large park in Rome, Italy, protected from development. It is part of the Parco Regionale Appia Antica (Appian Way Regional Park). The park is contained in the Caffarella Valley and is bordered on its northern side by the Via Latina and on its southern by the Appian Way. It stretches from the main Rome-Pisa railroad tracks near the Aurelian Wall at its western edge to the Via dell'Almone to the east. It contains several sites of archaeological interest, as well as a working farm, and has considerable ecological value, with 78 species of birds and fauna. The Catacombs of Rome and Colli Albani (Rome Metro) are nearby.

== History ==
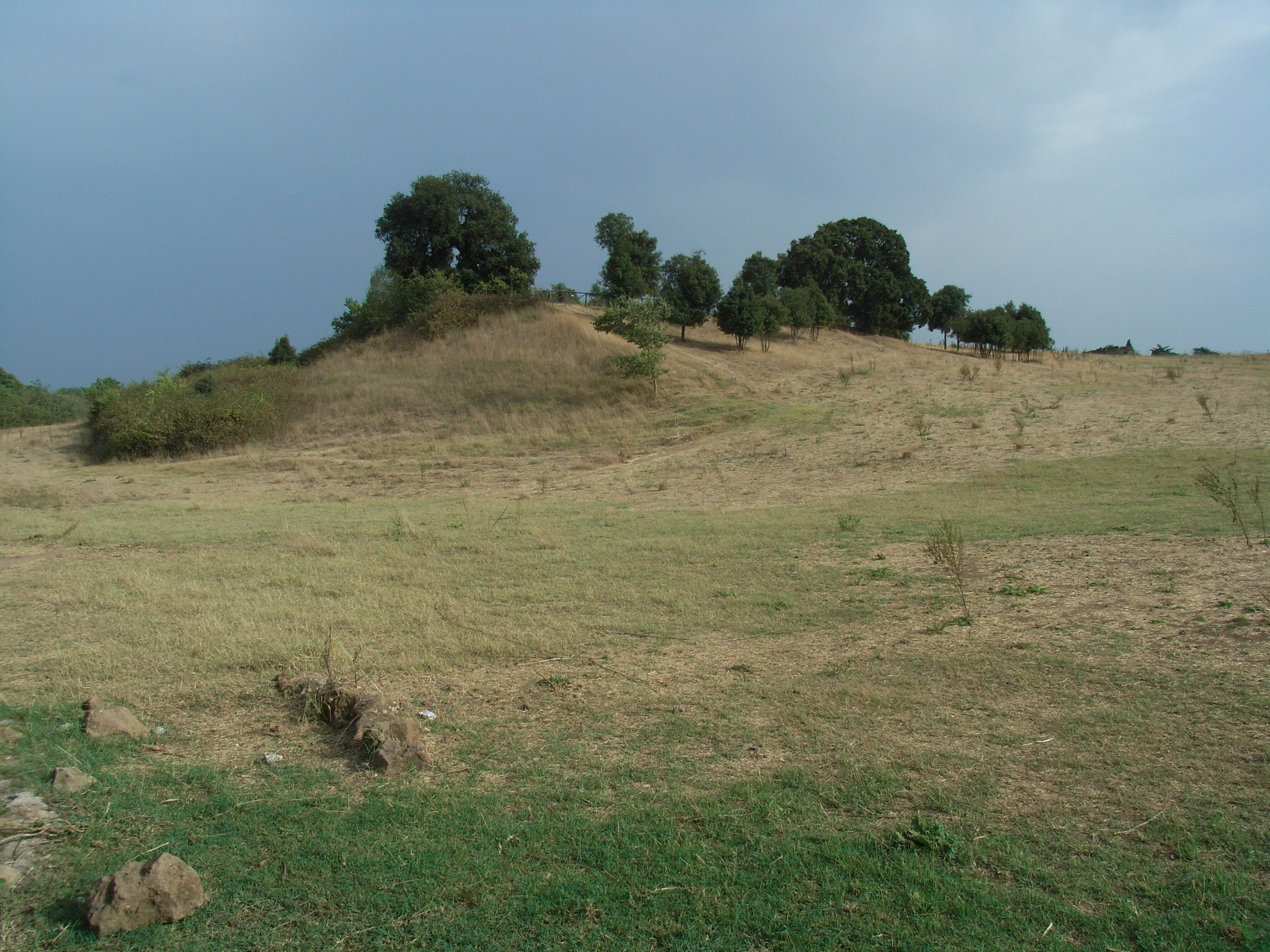
View in Caffarella Park--The Sacred Woods

In Roman times much of the area was occupied by a large estate known as the Triopius. Herodes Atticus was a Greek who became a Roman senator. Through his marriage to Annia Regilla, he acquired the land of the estate that stretched from the Caffarella Park to the Appian Way. Two ruins in the park date from that time: the tomb of Annia Regilla and the Nympheum of Egeria. Several towers in the park are medieval and served mainly as watch towers.

The modern name of the park comes from the Caffarelli family, which operated a farm in the area in the 16th century. It was subsequently owned by the Pallavicini family and the Torlonias. In the mid-20th century the area was in major danger of being used for urban expansion, but it was protected and then incorporated into the Appian Way park following popular campaigns for its preservation.

== Major features ==
- The Nympheum of Egeria. This spring and the surrounding construction can be dated back to the middle of the 2nd century AD by reference to the types of bricks used in its construction. The water springs from the rear of the nympheum under a now-headless reclining statue of the god Almo (a personification of the River Almone). The Nympheum was constructed by Herodes Atticus after he was cleared of the murder of Annia Regilla. It is mentioned by Valerius Antias.

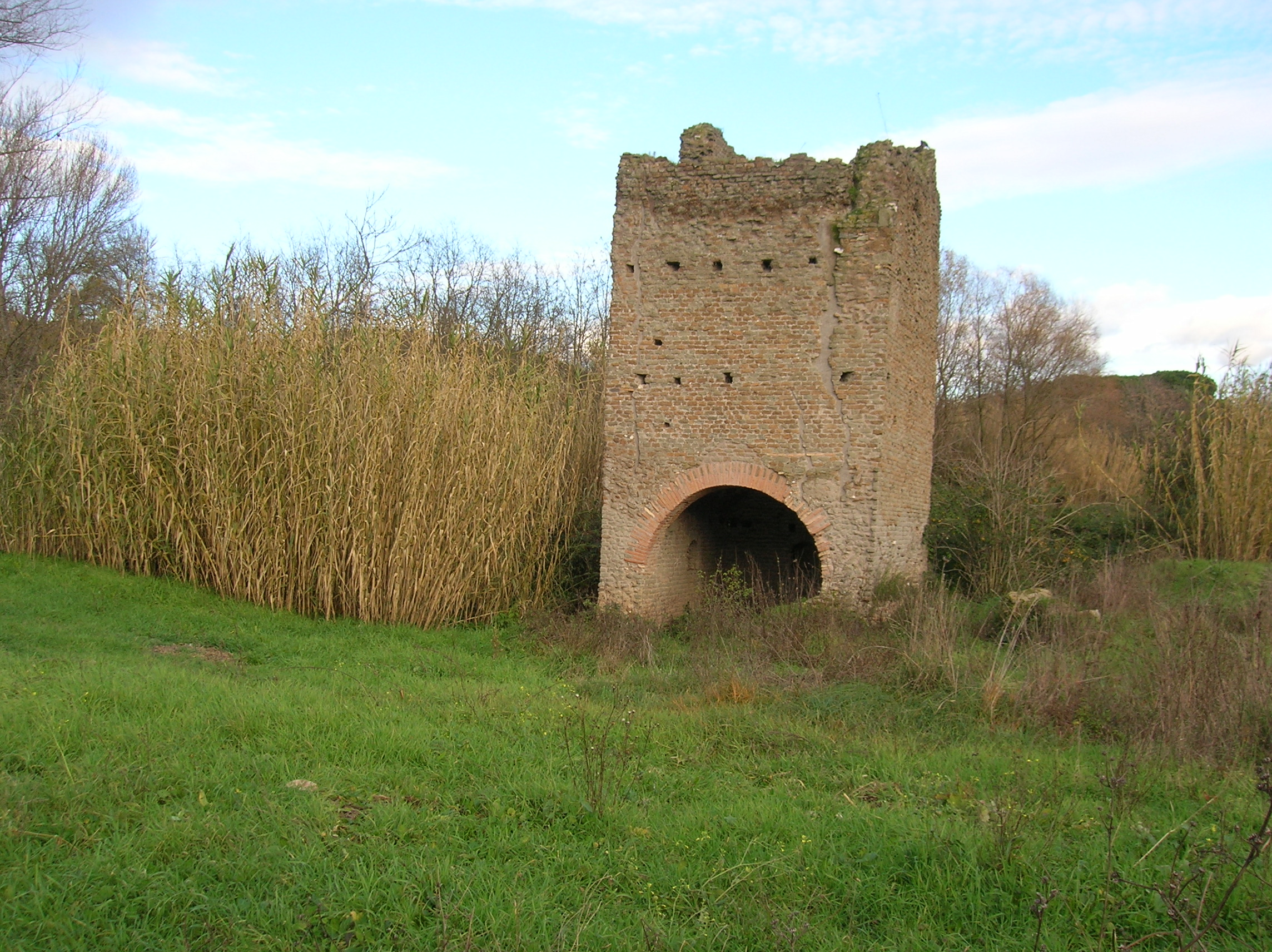
The Valca Tower

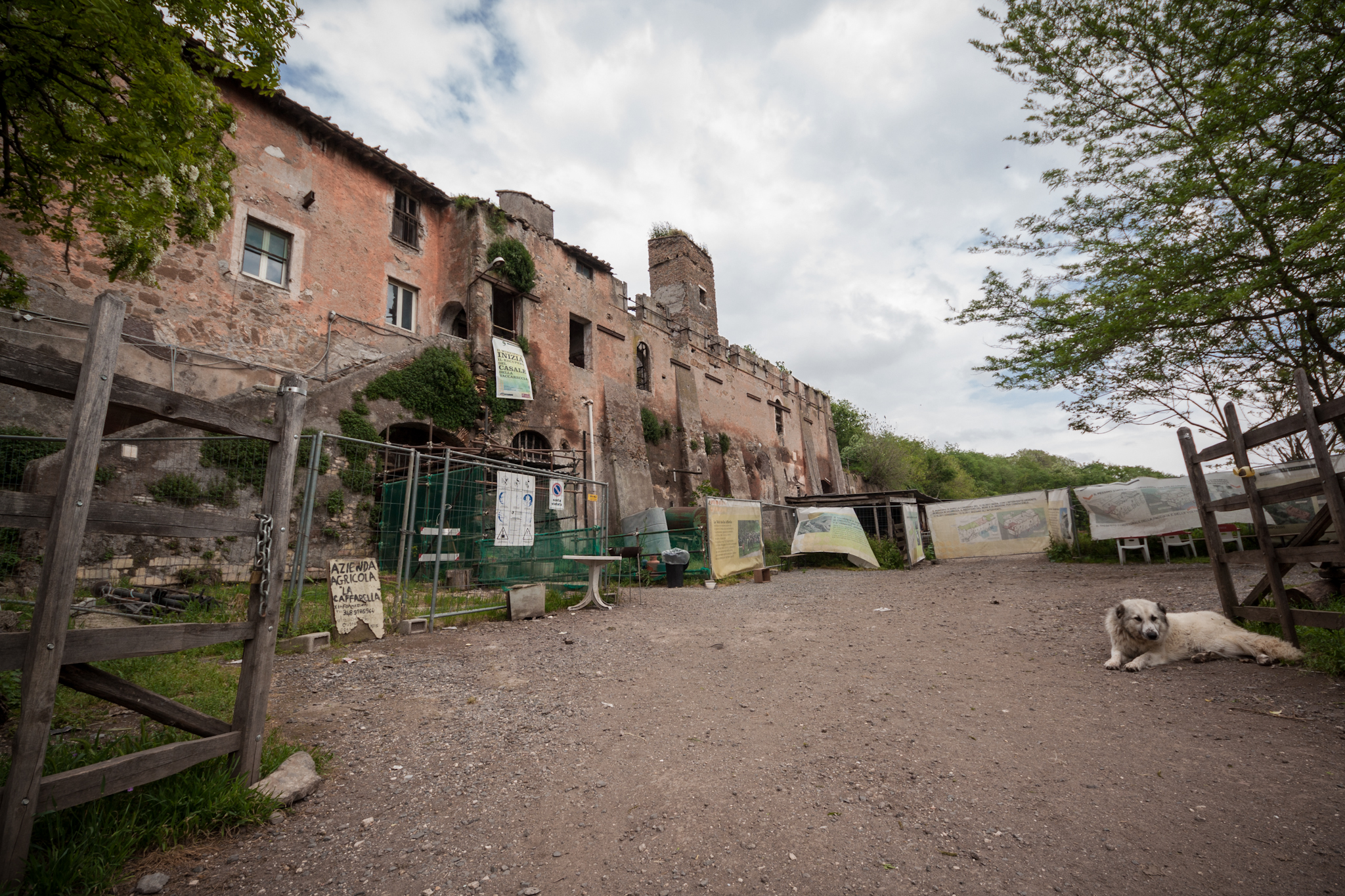
The old Casale della Vaccareccia

- Tomb of Annia Regilla. This well-preserved building is also known as the Temple of the God Rediculus, as scholars erroneously believed that its temple-like appearance meant that it had been built in honour of Rediculus, the god that Romans honoured at the beginning and end of each journey. Designed as a sepulchre, it is not certain that it is the tomb of Annia Regilla. The construction is of red and yellow brick and there are two floors, with significant remaining external decoration. In the Middle Ages, it served as a hay loft for a neighbouring farmhouse.
- Valca Tower. This building is constructed from rectangular blocks of tuff and dates back to the 12th or 13th century. It was protected by a first wall of defence and a drawbridge. The tower is believed to have been part of a fulling mill.

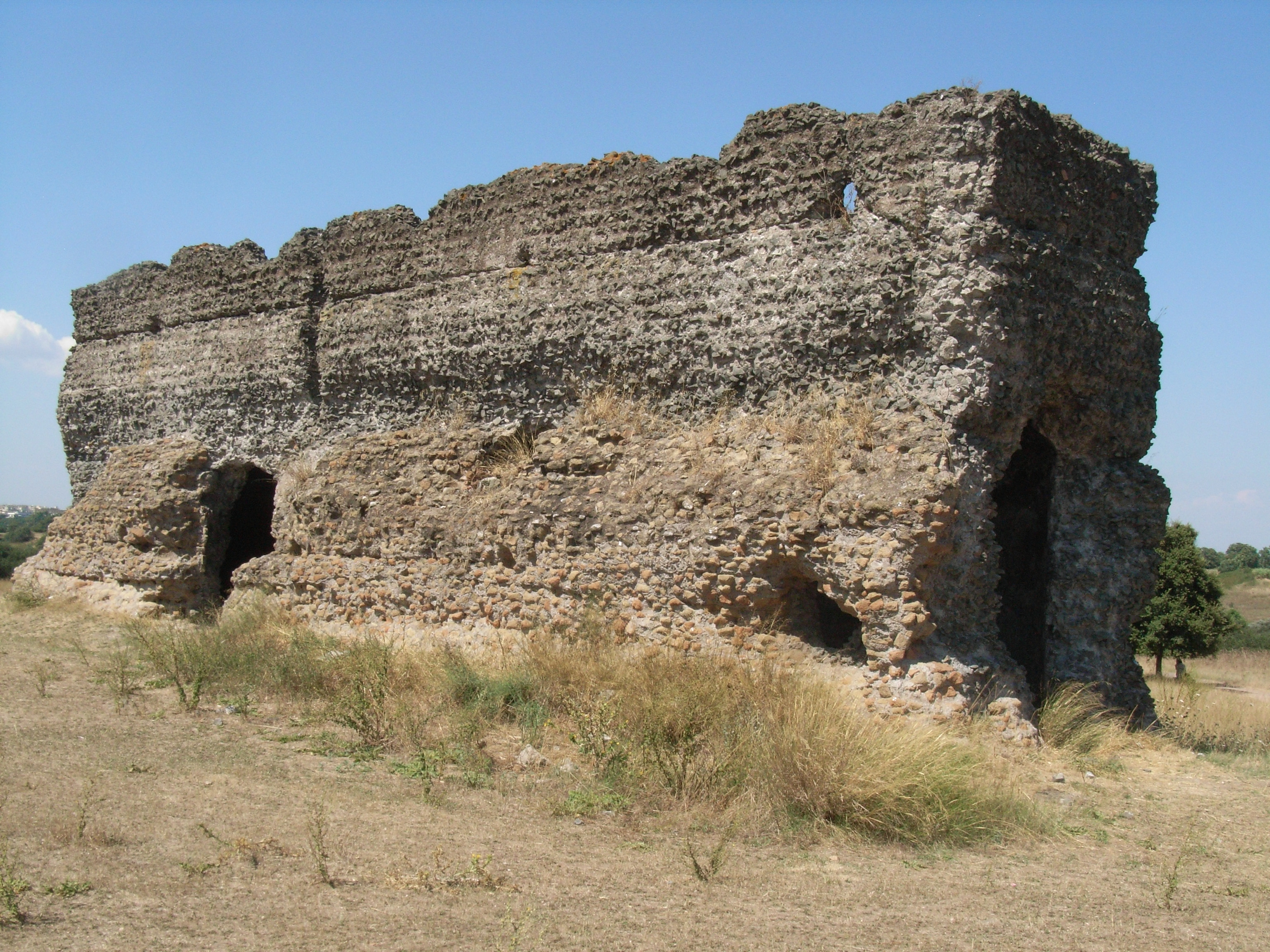
Roman cistern

- Roman cistern. Constructed around 100 AD and originally underground, this cistern was exposed when earth moving was carried out for the construction of the nearby Circus of Maxentius.
- Columbarium of Constantine. This columbarium, a building for housing the ashes of the deceased, dates back to the 2nd century AD. During the Middle Ages it was converted into a mill.
- The Sacred Wood is a spot on a hill overlooking the valley and with good views of the mountains surrounding Rome and the Castelli Romani. According to tradition, this is the spot at which Herodes Atticus ordered a sacred wood to be planted.

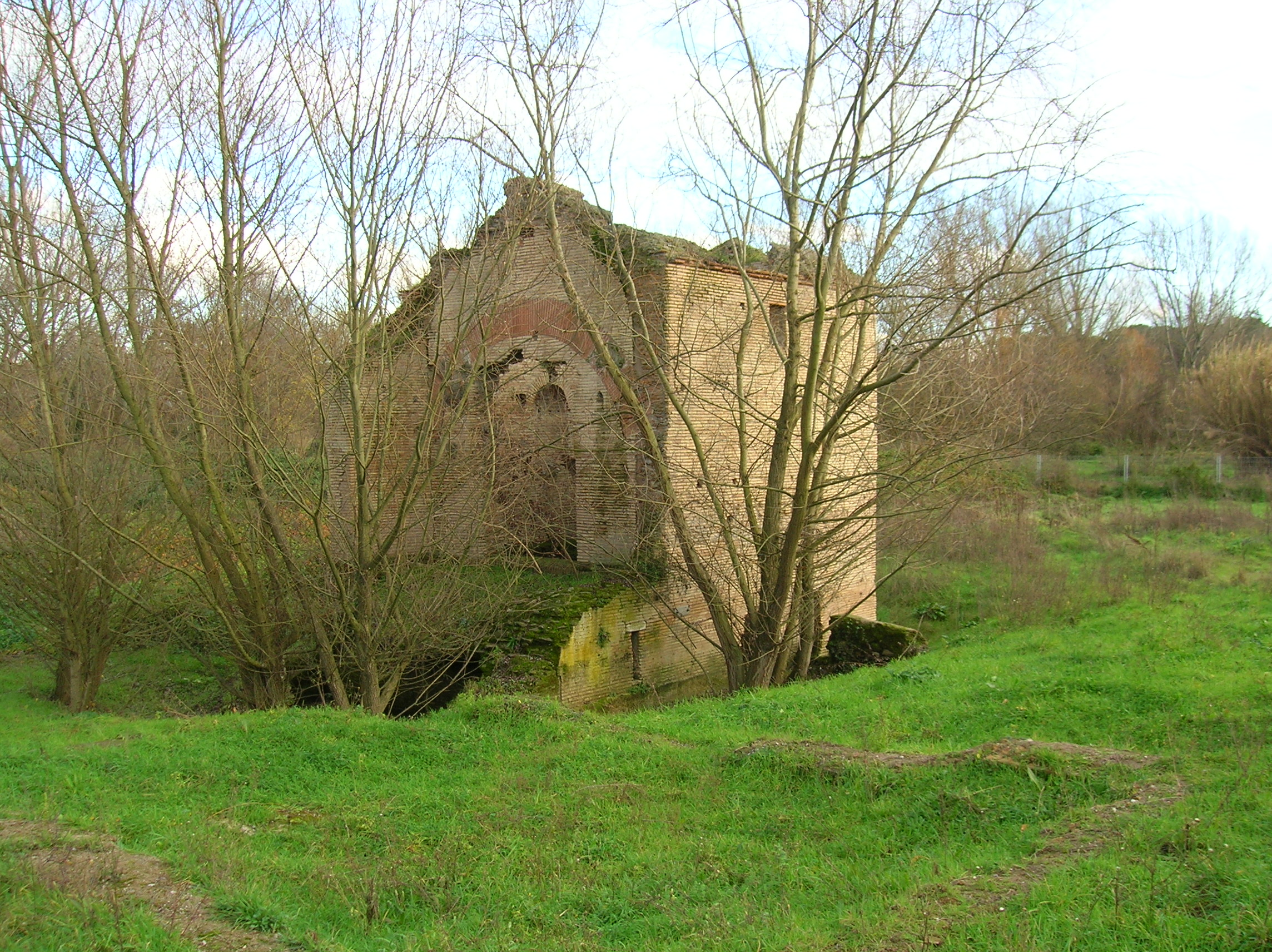
Colombario Costantiniano

- Church of Sant'Urbano alla Caffarella. A 7th-century church built over a 2nd-century pagan temple.

== See also ==
- List of parks and gardens in Rome
