= Lucius Valerius Antias =

Lucius Valerius Antias (fl. 215 BC) was a commander of ancient Rome. He was sent by Publius Valerius Flaccus with five ships in 215 BCE to convey to Rome the Carthaginian ambassadors, who had been captured by the Romans on their way to Philip V of Macedon.

Some historians have speculated that Livy's mention of this man is derived from the works of the historian Valerius Antias, who may have invented "Lucius Valerius Antias" as a naval ancestor for himself, to indicate that his family had played an early role in the Roman political life of the Valerii. Other historians think it plausible this Antias existed, and may have served with Flaccus as a family dependent.
