= Valerius Antias =

1st-century BC Roman historian

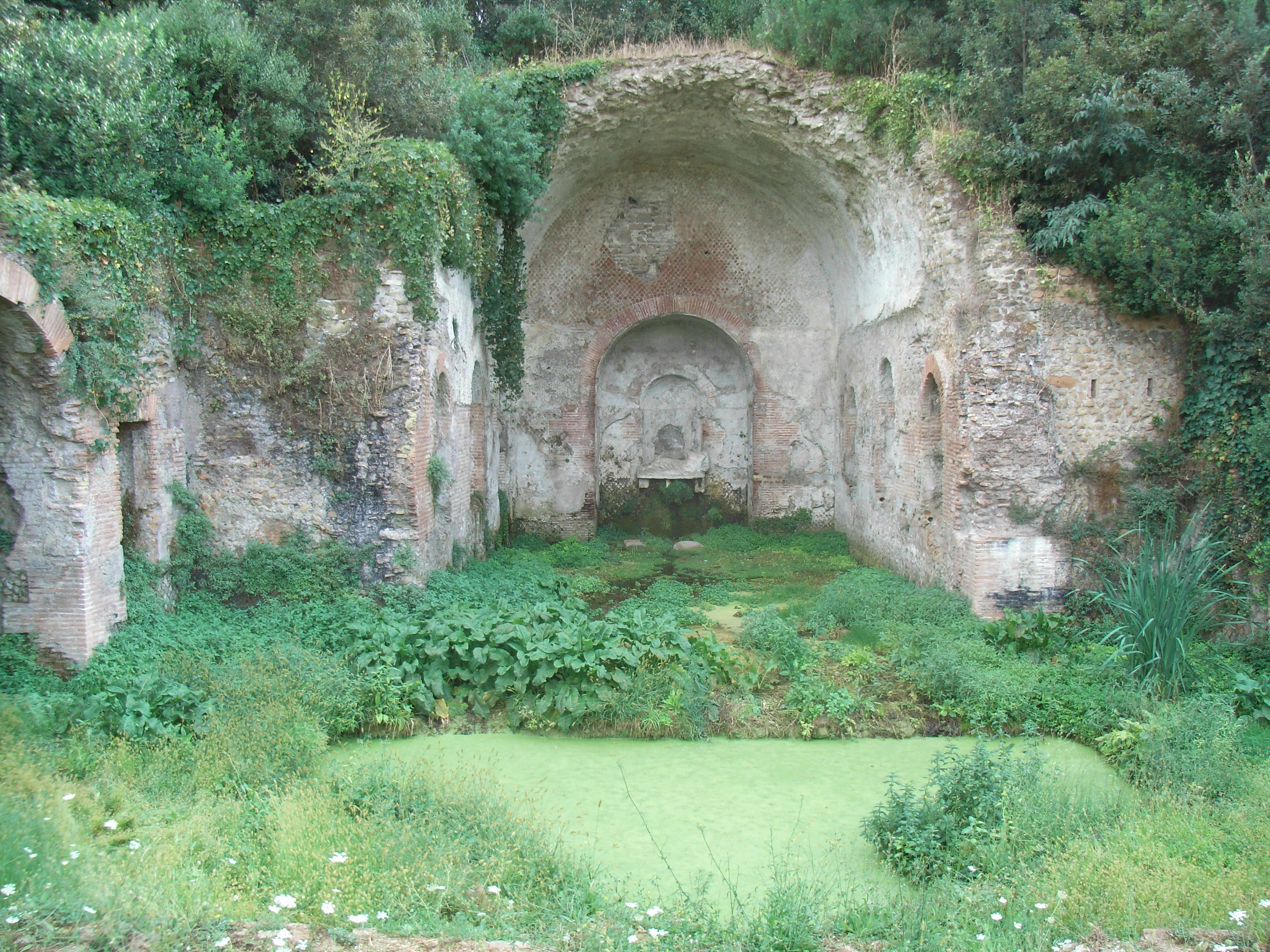
Shrine of the nymph Egeria, Caffarella Park, Rome. Numa Pompilius consulted her frequently, but on the early Aventine. The life of Numa was of extensive interest to Antias. In Fragment 6 (Plutarch, Numa, 15 and elsewhere) following the nymph's advice he summons Jupiter from heaven and forces him to accept a remedy of onion and fish heads to counter the effects of a lightning strike, instead of the human heads proposed by the god. Livy ignores the story.

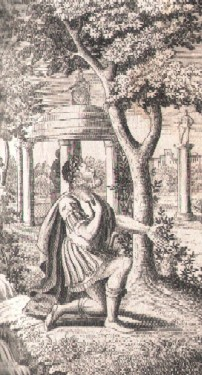
Numa Pompilius consulting Egeria.

Valerius Antias (fl. 1st century BC) was an ancient Roman annalist whom Livy mentions as a source. No complete works of his survive but from the sixty-five fragments said to be his in the works of other authors it has been deduced that he wrote a chronicle of ancient Rome in at least seventy-five books. The latest dateable event in the fragments is mention of the heirs of the orator Lucius Licinius Crassus, who died in 91 BC. Of the seventy references to Antias in classical literature, sixty-one mention him as an authority on Roman legendary history.

== Life ==
Little can be deduced about the life of Valerius Antias. Historians surmise that his family were the Valerii Antiates, a branch of the Valeria gens residing (at least from early republican times) in the vicinity of Antium. He may have been descended from Lucius Valerius Antias.

He was probably a younger contemporary of Quintus Claudius Quadrigarius and lived in the times of Sulla. However some scholars dispute this, arguing that he lived later (perhaps a contemporary of Julius Caesar) and wrote his work after 50 BC, because Cicero does not include him in a list of historians in De Legibus. Antias was considered the most important of the younger annalists.

== Work ==
The nearly completely lost work of Antias – cited as annales or as historiae – began its account of the Roman history with the foundation of Rome and extended at least to the year 91 BC. The second book told about the legendary Roman king Numa Pompilius, the twenty-second book about the capitulation of Gaius Hostilius Mancinus in 136 BC (this event Livy only reports in book 55 of his history). Therefore, the earlier times were reported much shorter than the contemporary history of the author.

The work of Antias was not very reliable. Livy criticizes his exaggerated numbers of killed and captured enemies in the Roman wars. Sometimes he seems to have even invented battles. But sometimes he also delivered correct values, which fact can be concluded from a comparison with some values given by Polybius.

Antias’ account of each year included the allocation of troops and provinces, important omen, battles, foundation of new colonies etc. At the end of the description of each year he reported about plays, temple inaugurations, and other news, in particular about events in the city of Rome. Under the influence of Hellenistic historiography Antias related his stories very long-winded and filled with sensationalism to entertain his readers. He embroidered the mostly short accounts of older historians with dramatic details and also recounted legends and miracles. He falsified the report about the trials of the Scipio brothers (compare Livy 38.50-60) and seems to have invented high offices and deeds of members of his house, the gens Valeria, who lived in the early Roman republic because there were no reliable sources about these early times, which could have disproved his assertions. Antias gave a rationalistic account about the discovery of the coffins with the books of king Numa, because he had the coffins uncovered by rain and not by excavation like in the older tradition.

The style of Antias was simple, but not archaic, and Marcus Cornelius Fronto (epistel ad Verus 1, 1, p. 134, 2 ed. Van den Hout) judged his language and style to be unattractive (invenuste). Therefore, he was rarely cited literally by later grammarians.

== Legacy ==
In one long-standing view of Antias' influence on Livy, the latter relied mainly on the former in Books 1-10 of Ab Urbe Condita Libri, the legendary history of Rome. To elucidate this possible influence, A.A. Howard compared each of Antias' fragments with the equivalent story in Livy. He deduced that there is no evidence of such influence in the first ten books. Of twenty fragments falling within the period Livy does not use any, either omitting the information, or explicitly disagreeing with it. Howard says:

"The argument that Livy made free use of Antias and mentioned him only in case of disagreement is absolutely without foundation, for we have seen fourteen specific instances in which, although Livy does not mention him, he nevertheless disagrees with his statements as known to us from other sources, or absolutely disregards them...."

For example, in Fragment 1 Acca Larentia willed her property to Romulus. Livy does not mention it. Fragment 3 mentions that exactly 527 Sabine Women were kidnapped. Livy says the number is greater than 30, and so on. For the entire period covered by Livy, 33 fragments of Antias come from Livy. He disagrees with six of these, criticizes eleven more, quotes Antias in disagreement on ten, and agrees with, but later disproves, two. Howard concludes disparagingly that

"It is on such evidence as this that we are asked to believe that Antias was the source of considerable portions of Livy's history and that Livy followed blindly, at least in the earlier part of his work. "

== See also ==
- Livy's History of Rome
