= Clivus Palatinus =

Road in ancient Rome

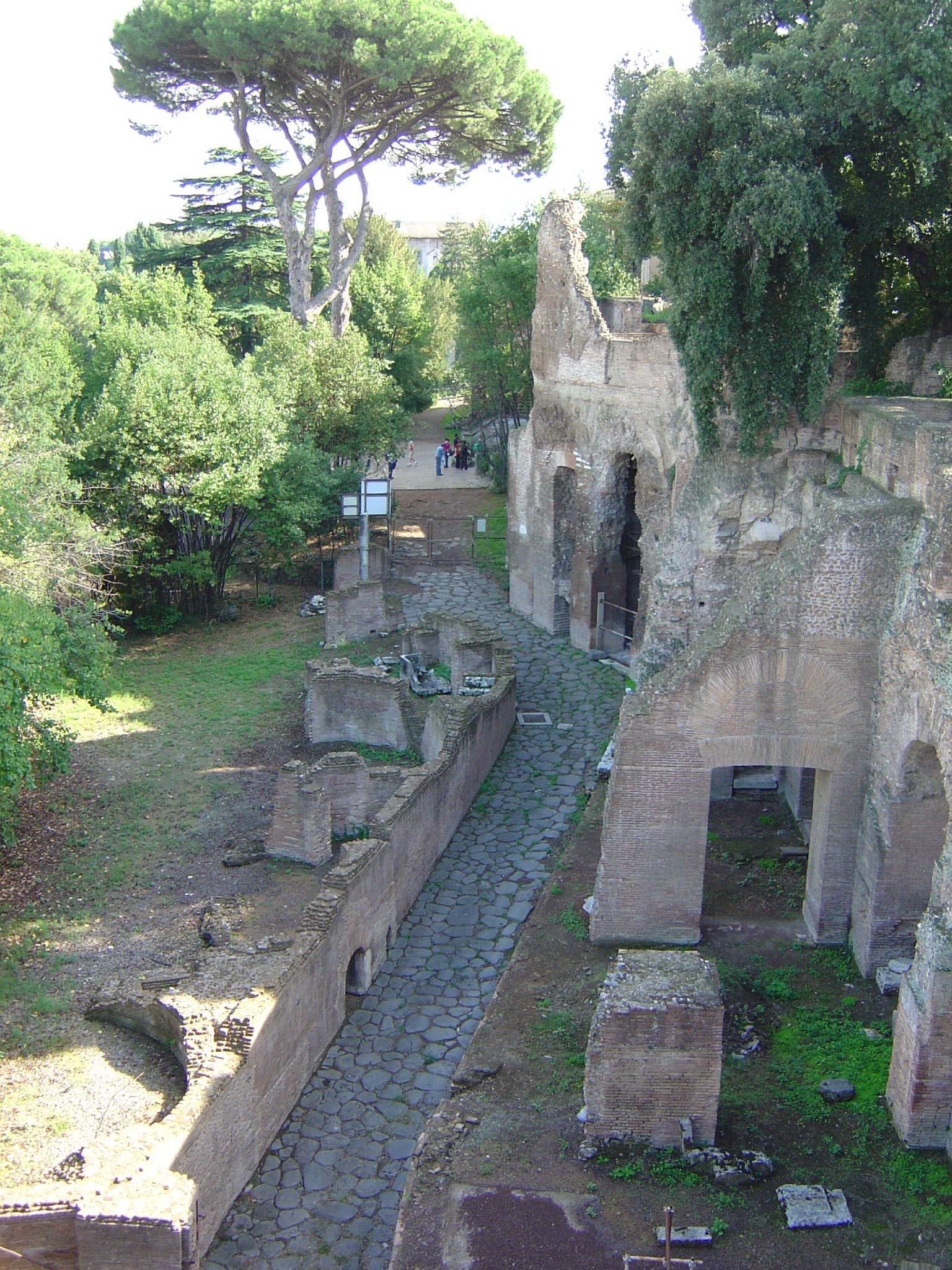
Clivus Palatinus intersecting with Clivus Victoriae

The Clivus Palatinus is a modern term for a road in ancient Rome between the Roman Forum and the Palatine Hill. It formed a processional route that issues off the Via Sacra near the Arch of Titus and runs up onto the Palatine, where it terminates, though it probably ran as far as the Domus Augustana. Several stretches of the road's paving remain. The Arch of Domitian once stood on this road.

== Bibliography ==
- "Clivus Palatinus", in L. Richardson, A New Topographical Dictionary of Ancient Rome, Baltimore - London, 1992, ISBN 0801843006, pp.90.
