= Egeria (mythology) =

Legendary wife of Roman king Numa, minor goddess

- Nymph, giver of laws and rituals
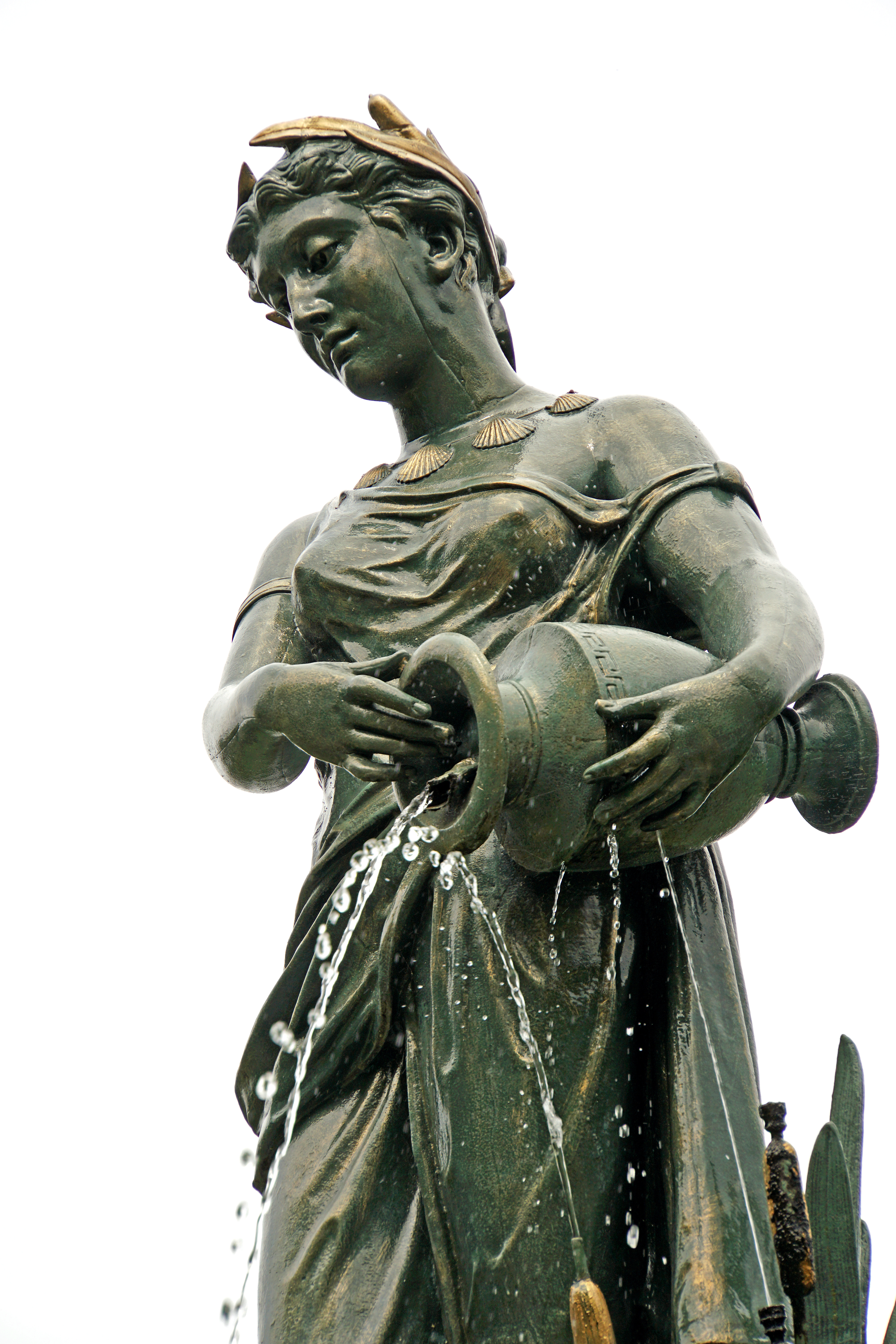
- Sculpture of Egeria on a fountain in Halifax, Nova Scotia
- Other names: Aegeria
- Major cult center: spring and grove near the Porta Capena; Nympheum of Egeria; Temple of Diana at Nemi
- Gender: female
- Consort: possibly Numa Pompilius

Equivalents
- Etruscan: possibly Vegoia

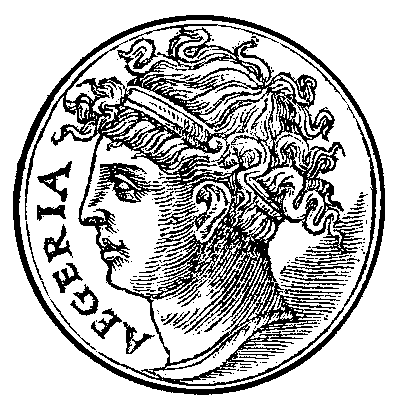
A sixteenth-century drawing of Egeria

Egeria (Latin: [eːˈgɛria]; Ancient Greek: Ἠγερία) was a nymph attributed a legendary role in the early history of Rome as a divine consort and counselor of Numa Pompilius, the second king of Rome (r. 715 – 672 BC), to whom she imparted laws and rituals pertaining to ancient Roman religion. Her name has become an eponym for a female advisor or counselor.

== Origin and etymology ==
Egeria may predate Roman myth: she could have been of Italic origin in the sacred forest of Aricia in Latium, her immemorial site, which was equally the grove of Diana Nemorensis ("Diana of Nemi"). At Aricia there was also a Manius Egerius, a male counterpart of Egeria.

The name Egeria has been diversely interpreted. Georges Dumézil proposed it came from ē-gerere ("bear out"), suggesting an origin from her childbirth role. Her role as prophetess and author of "sacred books" is similar to the Etruscan Vegoia, to whom were attributed various books of prophecy, including the "Libri Fulgurales", which were used to interpret the will of the gods through lightning strikes.

== Function ==
Egeria as a nymph or minor goddess of the Roman religious system is of unclear origin; she is consistently, though not in a very clear way, associated with another figure of the Diana type; their cult is known to have been celebrated at sacred groves, such as the site of Nemi at Aricia, and another one close to Rome (see section below); both goddesses are also associated with water bearing wondrous, religious or medical properties (the source in that grove at Rome was dedicated to the exclusive use of the Vestals); their cult was associated with other, male figures of even more obscure meaning, such as one named Virbius, or a Manius Egerius, presumably a youthful male, that anyway in later years was identified with figures like Atys or Hippolyte, because of the Diana reference (see Frazer).

Described sometime as a "mountain nymph" (Plutarch), she is usually regarded as a water nymph and somehow her cult also involved some link with childbirth, like the Greek goddess Ilithyia, but most of all, Egeria gave wisdom and prophecy in return for libations of water or milk at her sacred groves. This quality has been made especially popular through the tale of her relationship with Numa Pompilius (the second legendary king of Rome, who succeeded its founder Romulus).

== Relationship with Numa Pompilius ==
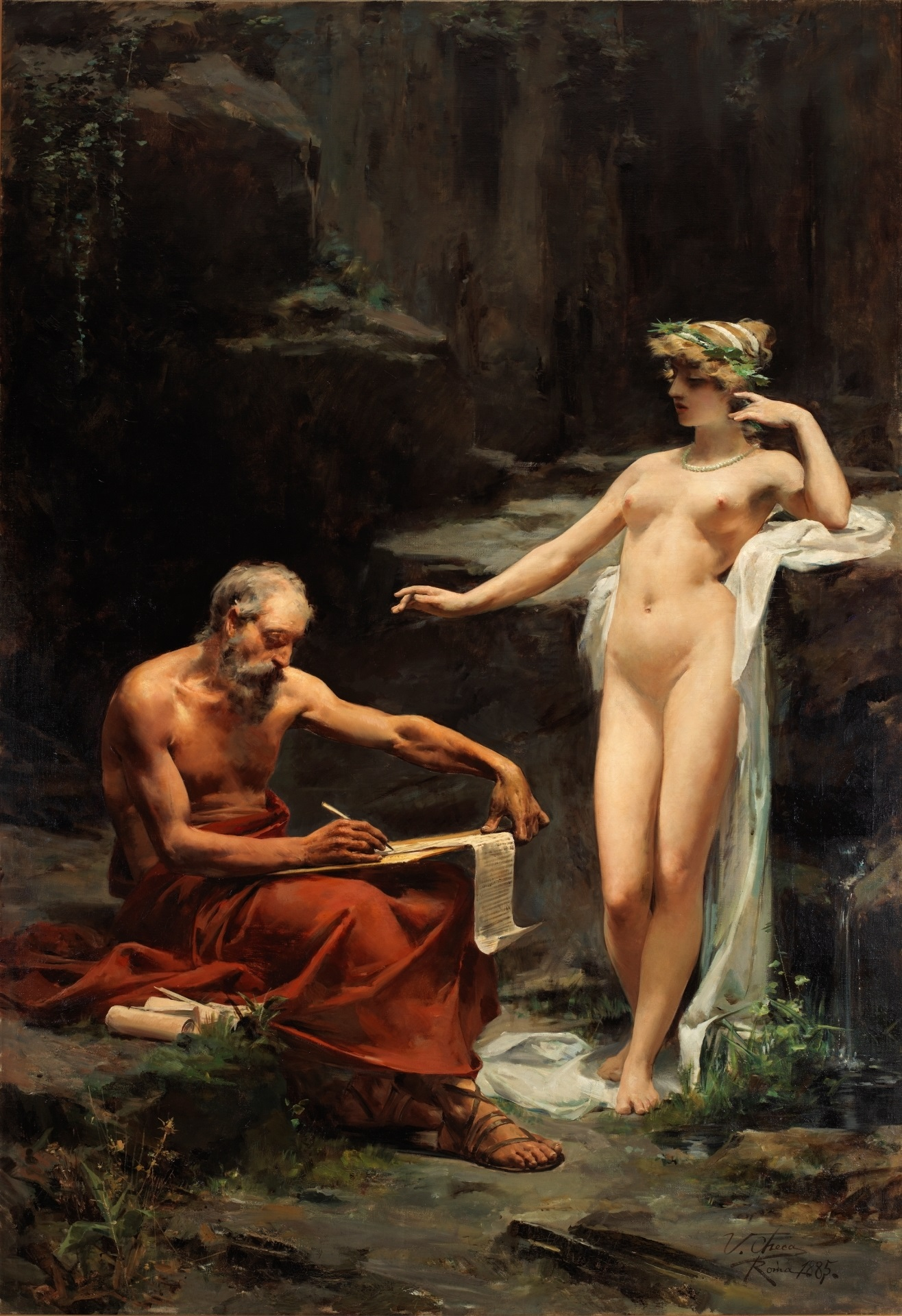
The nymph Egeria dictating the laws of Rome to Numa Pompilius, by Ulpiano Checa.

According to mythology, she counseled and guided the King Numa Pompilius (Latin numen designates "the expressed will of a deity") in the establishment of the original framework of laws and rituals of Rome. Numa is reputed to have written down the teachings of Egeria in "sacred books" that he had buried with him. When a chance accident brought them back to light some 500 years later, the Senate deemed them inappropriate for disclosure to the people, and ordered their destruction. What made them inappropriate was some matter of religious nature with political bearing that apparently has not been handed down by Valerius Antias, the source that Plutarch was using. Dionysius of Halicarnassus hints that they were actually kept as a very close secret by the Pontifices.

She is also gifted with oracular capabilities (she interpreted for Numa the abstruse omens of gods, for instance the episode of the omen from Faunus). In another episode, she helps Numa in a battle of wits with Jupiter himself, whereby Numa sought to gain a protective ritual against lightning strikes and thunder.

Numa also invoked communicating with other deities, such as the Muses; hence naturally enough, the somewhat pale figure of Egeria was later categorized by the Romans as one of the Camenae, deities who came to be equated with the Greek Muses as Rome fell under the cultural influence of Greece; so Dionysius listed Egeria among the Muses.

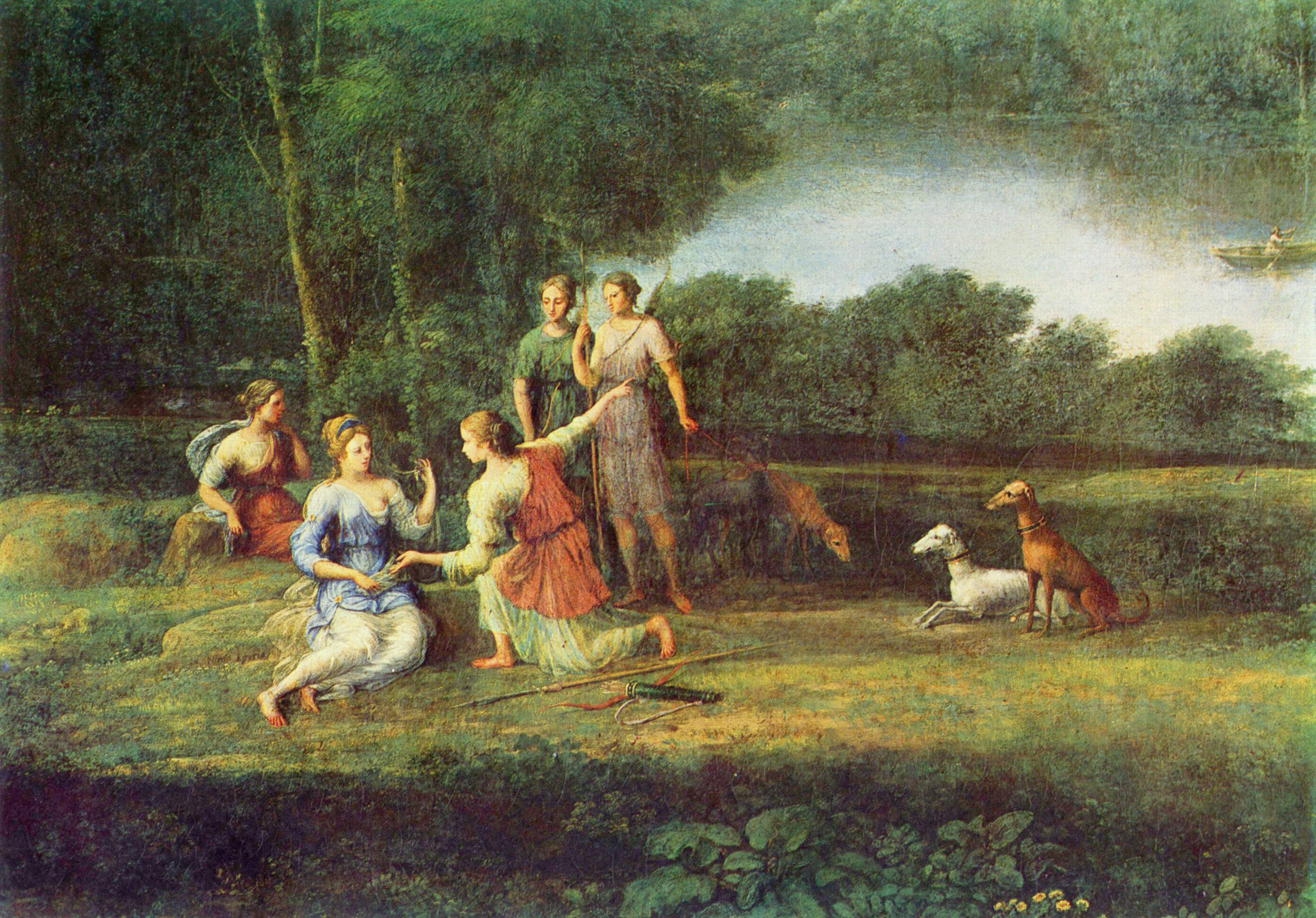
Egeria mourns Numa (1669) by Claude Lorrain

The precise level of Egeria's relationship to Numa has been described diversely. She is typically given the respectful label coniuncta ("consort"); Plutarch is very evasive as of the actual mode of intimacy between Numa and Egeria, and hints that Numa himself entertained a level of ambiguity. By Juvenal's day, that tradition was treated more critically. Juvenal called her Numa's amica ("girlfriend") in a sceptical phrase.

According to the traditional chronology, Numa died of old age about 673 BC. In Ovid's Metamorphoses, following Numa's death, Egeria melted into tears of sorrow, thus becoming a spring (...donec pietate dolentis / mota soror Phoebi gelidum de corpore fontem / fecit...), traditionally identified with the one near Rome's Porta Capena.

== Egeria spring in Rome ==
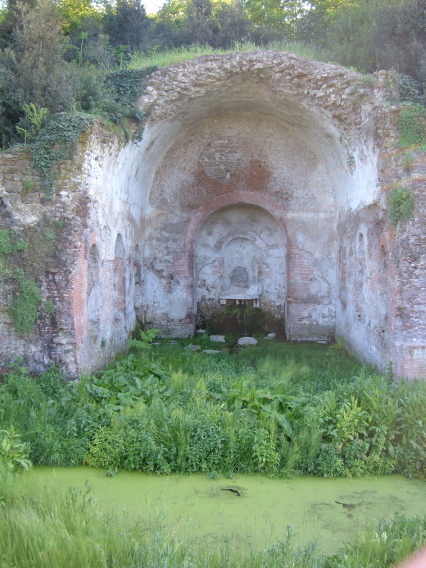
Apse of the Ninfeo d'Egeria, Parco della Caffarella, Rome

A spring and a grove once sacred to Egeria stand close to a gate of Rome, the Porta Capena. Its waters were dedicated to the exclusive use of the Vestals. The ninfeo, a favored picnic spot for nineteenth-century Romans, can still be visited in the archaeological Park of the Caffarella, between the Appian Way and the even more ancient Via Latina, nearby the Baths of Caracalla (a later construction).

In the second century, when Herodes Atticus recast an inherited villa nearby as a great landscaped estate, the natural grotto was formalized as an arched interior with an apsidal end where a statue of Egeria once stood in a niche; the surfaces were enriched with revetments of green and white marble facings and green porphyry flooring and friezes of mosaic. The primeval spring, one of dozens of springs that flow into the river Almone, was made to feed large pools, one of which was known as Lacus Salutaris or "Lake of Health". Juvenal regretted an earlier phase of architectural elaboration:

Nymph of the Spring! More honour'd hadst thou been,
If, free from art, an edge of living green,
Thy bubbling fount had circumscribed alone,
And marble ne’er profaned the native stone.

== In culture ==
- In Nathaniel Lee's English Restoration tragedy Lucius Junius Brutus (1680), Egeria appears in a vision to Brutus' son Titus.
- Two letters written by John Adams to Charles Adams and John Quincy Adams in January of 1794 make allusions to the myth of Numa and Egeria in relation to recent developments in Thomas Jefferson’s political career. Adams’s references to Jefferson’s “Conversations with Egeria in the Groves” at Monticello have been interpreted by some historians as euphemistic acknowledgment of the affair between Jefferson and Sally Hemings.
- Canto IV of Byron's 1812-1818 narrative poem Childe Harold's Pilgrimage mentions Egeria twice and refers to her grotto.
- Letitia Elizabeth Landon's poem Egeria's Grotto in The New Monthly Magazine, 1826, descriptive of an artistic representation of Egeria's Spring.
- In Elizabeth Gaskell's 1864-1866 novel Wives and Daughters, a main character who has not yet fallen in love with anyone imagines his future life partner to be "a grand woman, his equal, and his empress; beautiful in person, serene in wisdom, ready for counsel, as was Egeria."
- In Oscar Wilde's 1895 drawing-room play The Importance of Being Earnest, the canon, Chasuble, refers to Cecily's tutor, Miss Prism, as "Egeria."
- In Joseph Conrad's 1911 novel Under Western Eyes, Madame de S___, a Russian lady of "advanced views", is referred to as the Egeria of Peter Ivanovich, the "heroic fugitive" who wrote books preaching and practicing the cult of women under the rites of special devotion to the transcendental merits of Madame de S___.
- In the Stargate franchise, Egeria is the founder of the Tok'ra.
- In the video game Genshin Impact, Egeria, also known as the Mistress of Many Waters, was the original Hydro Archon, creator of the oceanids and Fontainian Humans, and the predecessor of the latest Hydro Archon, Focalors.
