= Compsosomatini =

Scientific classification
- Kingdom: Animalia
- Phylum: Arthropoda
- Clade: Pancrustacea
- Class: Insecta
- Order: Coleoptera
- Suborder: Polyphaga
- Infraorder: Cucujiformia
- Family: Cerambycidae
- Subfamily: Lamiinae
- Tribe: Compsosomatini; Thomson, 1857

Tribe of beetles

Compsosomatini is a tribe of longhorn beetles of the subfamily Lamiinae.

== Taxonomy ==
Genera:

- Aerenea
- Antennaerenea
- Brasiliosoma
- Compsosoma
- Cristaerenea
- Desmiphoropsis
- Eusphaerium
- Laraesima
- Paracompsosoma
- Parapythais
- Pythais
- Tessarecphora
- Tucales
