= Compsosoma =

Scientific classification
- Domain: Eukaryota
- Kingdom: Animalia
- Phylum: Arthropoda
- Class: Insecta
- Order: Coleoptera
- Suborder: Polyphaga
- Infraorder: Cucujiformia
- Family: Cerambycidae
- Tribe: Compsosomatini
- Genus: Compsosoma; Lacordaire, 1830

Genus of beetles

Compsosoma is a genus of longhorn beetles of the subfamily Lamiinae.

- Compsosoma alboapicalis Breuning, 1980
- Compsosoma chabrillacii Thomson, 1857
- Compsosoma fasciatum Monné, 1980
- Compsosoma geayi Gounelle, 1908
- Compsosoma mniszechii Thomson, 1857
- Compsosoma monnei Martins & Galileo, 1996
- Compsosoma mutillarium (Klug, 1825)
- Compsosoma nubilum Gounelle, 1908
- Compsosoma perpulchrum (Vigors, 1825)
- Compsosoma phaleratum Thomson, 1857
- Compsosoma v-notatum (Vigors, 1825)
- Compsosoma vestitipenne Zajciw, 1962
