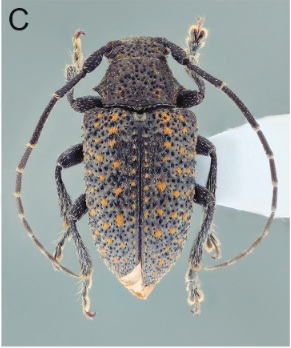

Scientific classification
- Kingdom: Animalia
- Phylum: Arthropoda
- Clade: Pancrustacea
- Class: Insecta
- Order: Coleoptera
- Suborder: Polyphaga
- Infraorder: Cucujiformia
- Family: Cerambycidae
- Genus: Laraesima
- Species: L. scutellaris

Binomial name
- Laraesima scutellaris Thomson, 1868

= Laraesima scutellaris =

Species of beetle

Laraesima scutellaris is a species of beetle in the family Cerambycidae. It was described by Thomson in 1868. It is known from Argentina and Brazil.
