= Laraesima =

Scientific classification
- Kingdom: Animalia
- Phylum: Arthropoda
- Class: Insecta
- Order: Coleoptera
- Suborder: Polyphaga
- Infraorder: Cucujiformia
- Family: Cerambycidae
- Subfamily: Lamiinae
- Tribe: Compsosomatini
- Genus: Laraesima; Thomson, 1868

Genus of beetles

Laraesima is a genus of longhorn beetles of the subfamily Lamiinae.

- Laraesima albosignata (Bates, 1885)
- Laraesima asperata (Bates, 1885)
- Laraesima brunneoscutellaris (Tippmann, 1960)
- Laraesima densepunctata Breuning, 1950
- Laraesima ecuadorensis Breuning, 1974
- Laraesima fuliginea (Bates, 1885)
- Laraesima hispida (Thomson, 1868)
- Laraesima nitida Monné, 1980
- Laraesima ochreoapicalis Breuning, 1973
- Laraesima pilosa Monné, 1980
- Laraesima scutellaris Thomson, 1868
