= Laraesima albosignata =

Scientific classification
- Kingdom: Animalia
- Phylum: Arthropoda
- Class: Insecta
- Order: Coleoptera
- Suborder: Polyphaga
- Infraorder: Cucujiformia
- Family: Cerambycidae
- Genus: Laraesima
- Species: L. albosignata

Binomial name
- Laraesima albosignata (Bates, 1885)

Synonyms
- Penessada albosignata Bates, 1885

Species of beetle

Laraesima albosignata is a species of beetle in the family Cerambycidae. It was described by Henry Walter Bates in 1885. It is known from Guatemala.
