= Laraesima ochreoapicalis =

Scientific classification
- Kingdom: Animalia
- Phylum: Arthropoda
- Class: Insecta
- Order: Coleoptera
- Suborder: Polyphaga
- Infraorder: Cucujiformia
- Family: Cerambycidae
- Genus: Laraesima
- Species: L. ochreoapicalis

Binomial name
- Laraesima ochreoapicalis Breuning, 1973

Species of beetle

Laraesima ochreoapicalis is a species of beetle in the family Cerambycidae. It was described by Stephan von Breuning in 1973. It is known from Brazil.
