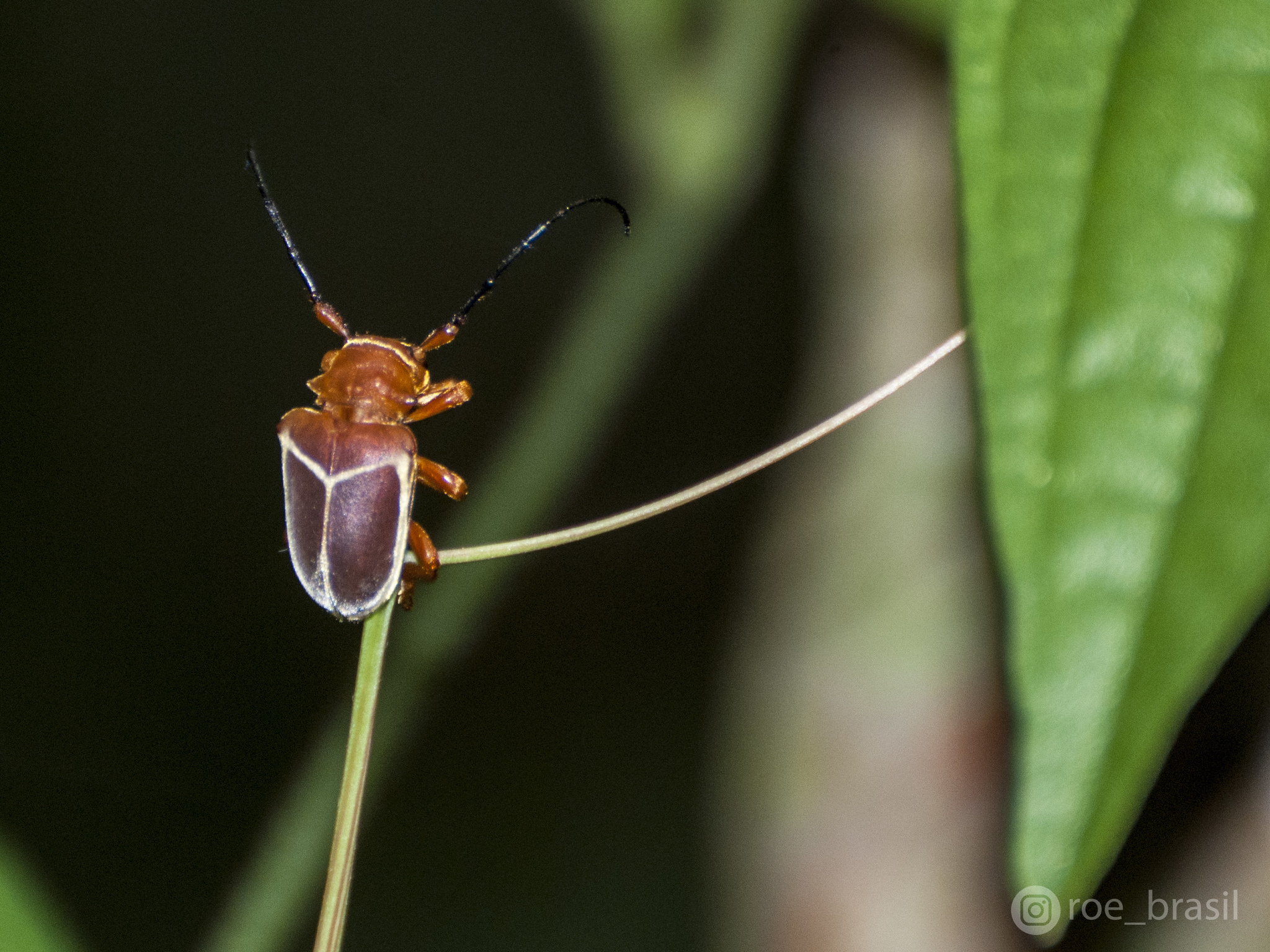
- Pythais scutigera, Brazil

Scientific classification
- Domain: Eukaryota
- Kingdom: Animalia
- Phylum: Arthropoda
- Class: Insecta
- Order: Coleoptera
- Suborder: Polyphaga
- Infraorder: Cucujiformia
- Family: Cerambycidae
- Subfamily: Lamiinae
- Tribe: Compsosomatini
- Genus: Pythais; Thomson, 1857
- Species: P. scutigera

Binomial name
- Pythais scutigera (Vigors, 1826)

= Pythais =

Genus of beetles

Pythais is a genus of flat-faced longhorns in the beetle family Cerambycidae. This genus has a single species, Pythais scutigera, found in Brazil.
