= Tucales terrenus =

Scientific classification
- Kingdom: Animalia
- Phylum: Arthropoda
- Class: Insecta
- Order: Coleoptera
- Suborder: Polyphaga
- Infraorder: Cucujiformia
- Family: Cerambycidae
- Genus: Tucales
- Species: T. terrenus

Binomial name
- Tucales terrenus (Pascoe, 1859)

Synonyms
- Aerenea terrena Pascoe, 1859; Compsosoma terrena Lacordaire, 1872; Compsosoma terrenum Bates, 1866

Species of beetle

Tucales terrenus is a species of beetle in the family Cerambycidae. It was described by Pascoe in 1859. It is known from Brazil.
