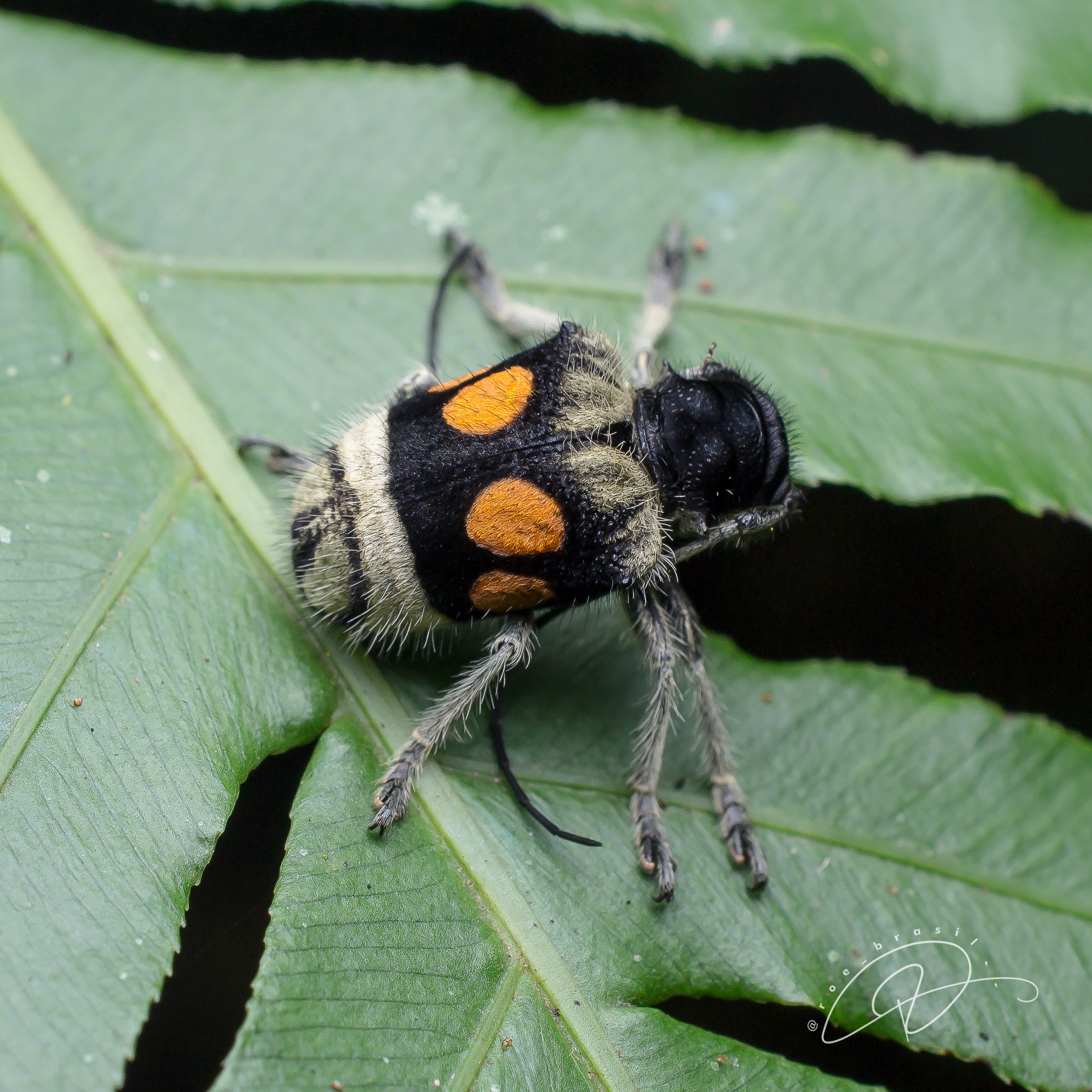

Scientific classification
- Domain: Eukaryota
- Kingdom: Animalia
- Phylum: Arthropoda
- Class: Insecta
- Order: Coleoptera
- Suborder: Polyphaga
- Infraorder: Cucujiformia
- Family: Cerambycidae
- Genus: Compsosoma
- Species: C. mutillarium

Binomial name
- Compsosoma mutillarium (Klug, 1825)

= Compsosoma mutillarium =

Species of beetle

Compsosoma mutillarium is a species of beetle in the family Cerambycidae. It was described by Johann Christoph Friedrich Klug in 1825. It is known from Brazil.
