= Laraesima fuliginea =

Scientific classification
- Kingdom: Animalia
- Phylum: Arthropoda
- Class: Insecta
- Order: Coleoptera
- Suborder: Polyphaga
- Infraorder: Cucujiformia
- Family: Cerambycidae
- Genus: Laraesima
- Species: L. fuliginea

Binomial name
- Laraesima fuliginea (Bates, 1885)

Synonyms
- Penessada fuliginea Bates, 1885

Species of beetle

Laraesima fuliginea is a species of beetle in the family Cerambycidae. It was described by Henry Walter Bates in 1885. It is known from Mexico and Guatemala.
