= Compsosoma v-notatum =

Scientific classification
- Domain: Eukaryota
- Kingdom: Animalia
- Phylum: Arthropoda
- Class: Insecta
- Order: Coleoptera
- Suborder: Polyphaga
- Infraorder: Cucujiformia
- Family: Cerambycidae
- Genus: Compsosoma
- Species: C. v-notatum

Binomial name
- Compsosoma v-notatum (Vigors, 1825)

Synonyms
- Lamia v-notata Vigors, 1825; Compsosoma niveosignata Audinet-Serville, 1835; Compsosoma notatum White, 1846; Compsosoma quinquenotatum Thomson, 1857; Compsosoma niveo-signata Chenu, 1870; Compsosoma quinquenotata Lacordaire, 1872; Compsosoma (Compsosoma) v-notatum Aurivillius, 1923; Compsosoma v-notata Blackwelder, 1946; Compsosoma (Pseudoguariteres) v-notatum Breuning, 1961; Compsosoma v-notatum Monné, 1980; Compsosoma niveosignatum Bousquet & al., 2009; Compsosoma v-notatum Lingafelter & Wappes, 2014

Species of beetle

Compsosoma v-notatum is a species of beetle in the family Cerambycidae. It was described by Vigors in 1825. It is known from Brazil.
