= Compsosoma phaleratum =

Scientific classification
- Domain: Eukaryota
- Kingdom: Animalia
- Phylum: Arthropoda
- Class: Insecta
- Order: Coleoptera
- Suborder: Polyphaga
- Infraorder: Cucujiformia
- Family: Cerambycidae
- Genus: Compsosoma
- Species: C. phaleratum

Binomial name
- Compsosoma phaleratum Thomson, 1857

Synonyms
- Compsosoma phalerata Thomson, 1857 (misspelling)

Species of beetle

Compsosoma phaleratum is a species of beetle in the family Cerambycidae. It was described by Thomson in 1857. It is known from Brazil.
