= Brasiliosoma =

Scientific classification
- Kingdom: Animalia
- Phylum: Arthropoda
- Class: Insecta
- Order: Coleoptera
- Suborder: Polyphaga
- Infraorder: Cucujiformia
- Family: Cerambycidae
- Tribe: Compsosomatini
- Genus: Brasiliosoma; Breuning, 1960

Genus of beetles

Brasiliosoma is a genus of longhorn beetles of the subfamily Lamiinae.

- Brasiliosoma apicale Monné, 1980
- Brasiliosoma tibiale (Breuning, 1948)
