= Compsosoma mniszechii =

Scientific classification
- Domain: Eukaryota
- Kingdom: Animalia
- Phylum: Arthropoda
- Class: Insecta
- Order: Coleoptera
- Suborder: Polyphaga
- Infraorder: Cucujiformia
- Family: Cerambycidae
- Genus: Compsosoma
- Species: C. mniszechii

Binomial name
- Compsosoma mniszechii Thomson, 1857

Species of beetle

Compsosoma mniszechii is a species of beetle in the family Cerambycidae. It was described by Thomson in 1857. It is known from Brazil and Peru.
