= Tucales pastranai =

Scientific classification
- Kingdom: Animalia
- Phylum: Arthropoda
- Class: Insecta
- Order: Coleoptera
- Suborder: Polyphaga
- Infraorder: Cucujiformia
- Family: Cerambycidae
- Genus: Tucales
- Species: T. pastranai

Binomial name
- Tucales pastranai (Prosen, 1954)

Synonyms
- Compsosoma pastranai Zajciw, 1967; Vaziella pastranai Prosen, 1954

Species of beetle

Tucales pastranai is a species of beetle in the family Cerambycidae. It was described by Prosen in 1954. It is known from Argentina and Brazil.
