= Laraesima pilosa =

Scientific classification
- Kingdom: Animalia
- Phylum: Arthropoda
- Class: Insecta
- Order: Coleoptera
- Suborder: Polyphaga
- Infraorder: Cucujiformia
- Family: Cerambycidae
- Genus: Laraesima
- Species: L. pilosa

Binomial name
- Laraesima pilosa Monné, 1980

Species of beetle

Laraesima pilosa is a species of beetle in the family Cerambycidae. It was described by Monné in 1980. It is known from Peru.
