= Compsosoma monnei =

Scientific classification
- Domain: Eukaryota
- Kingdom: Animalia
- Phylum: Arthropoda
- Class: Insecta
- Order: Coleoptera
- Suborder: Polyphaga
- Infraorder: Cucujiformia
- Family: Cerambycidae
- Genus: Compsosoma
- Species: C. monnei

Binomial name
- Compsosoma monnei Martins & Galileo, 1996

Species of beetle

Compsosoma monnei is a species of beetle in the family Cerambycidae. It was described by Martins and Galileo in 1996. It is known from Bolivia.
