= Laraesima hispida =

Scientific classification
- Kingdom: Animalia
- Phylum: Arthropoda
- Class: Insecta
- Order: Coleoptera
- Suborder: Polyphaga
- Infraorder: Cucujiformia
- Family: Cerambycidae
- Genus: Laraesima
- Species: L. hispida

Binomial name
- Laraesima hispida (Thomson, 1868)

Synonyms
- Laraesima asperipennis Breuning, 1948; Penessada hispida Thomson, 1868

Species of beetle

Laraesima hispida is a species of beetle in the family Cerambycidae. It was described by Thomson in 1868. It is known from Brazil.
