= Brasiliosoma tibiale =

Scientific classification
- Kingdom: Animalia
- Phylum: Arthropoda
- Class: Insecta
- Order: Coleoptera
- Suborder: Polyphaga
- Infraorder: Cucujiformia
- Family: Cerambycidae
- Genus: Brasiliosoma
- Species: B. tibiale

Binomial name
- Brasiliosoma tibiale (Breuning, 1948)

Synonyms
- Phrynosoma tibialis Breuning, 1948

Species of beetle

Brasiliosoma tibiale is a species of beetle in the family Cerambycidae. It was described by Stephan von Breuning in 1948. It is known from Brazil.
