= Laraesima ecuadorensis =

Scientific classification
- Kingdom: Animalia
- Phylum: Arthropoda
- Class: Insecta
- Order: Coleoptera
- Suborder: Polyphaga
- Infraorder: Cucujiformia
- Family: Cerambycidae
- Genus: Laraesima
- Species: L. ecuadorensis

Binomial name
- Laraesima ecuadorensis Breuning, 1974

Species of beetle

Laraesima ecuadorensis is a species of beetle in the family Cerambycidae. It was described by Stephan von Breuning in 1974. It is known from Ecuador.
