= Tucales franciscus =

Scientific classification
- Kingdom: Animalia
- Phylum: Arthropoda
- Class: Insecta
- Order: Coleoptera
- Suborder: Polyphaga
- Infraorder: Cucujiformia
- Family: Cerambycidae
- Genus: Tucales
- Species: T. franciscus

Binomial name
- Tucales franciscus (Thomson, 1857)

Synonyms
- Compsosoma franciscum Thomson, 1857 (misspelling); Tucales franciscum (Thomson, 1857) (misspelling); Compsosoma franciscanum Thomson, 1857 (unjustified emendation)

Species of beetle

Tucales franciscus is a species of beetle in the family Cerambycidae. It was described by Thomson in 1857. It is known from Brazil, Mexico, and French Guiana.
