= Tucales =

Scientific classification
- Kingdom: Animalia
- Phylum: Arthropoda
- Class: Insecta
- Order: Coleoptera
- Suborder: Polyphaga
- Infraorder: Cucujiformia
- Family: Cerambycidae
- Subfamily: Lamiinae
- Tribe: Compsosomatini
- Genus: Tucales; Gounelle, 1908

Genus of beetles

Tucales is a genus of longhorn beetles of the subfamily Lamiinae.

- Tucales franciscus (Thomson, 1857)
- Tucales pastranai (Prosen, 1954)
- Tucales terrenus (Pascoe, 1859)
