= Desmiphoropsis mannerheimi =

Scientific classification
- Kingdom: Animalia
- Phylum: Arthropoda
- Class: Insecta
- Order: Coleoptera
- Suborder: Polyphaga
- Infraorder: Cucujiformia
- Family: Cerambycidae
- Genus: Desmiphoropsis
- Species: D. mannerheimi

Binomial name
- Desmiphoropsis mannerheimi (Thomson, 1865)

Species of beetle

Desmiphoropsis mannerheimi is a species of beetle in the family Cerambycidae. It was described by Thomson in 1865. It is known from French Guiana.
