= Desmiphoropsis =

Scientific classification
- Kingdom: Animalia
- Phylum: Arthropoda
- Class: Insecta
- Order: Coleoptera
- Suborder: Polyphaga
- Infraorder: Cucujiformia
- Family: Cerambycidae
- Subfamily: Lamiinae
- Tribe: Compsosomatini
- Genus: Desmiphoropsis; Gounelle, 1908

Genus of beetles

Desmiphoropsis is a genus of longhorn beetles of the subfamily Lamiinae.

- Desmiphoropsis mannerheimi (Thomson, 1865)
- Desmiphoropsis variegata (Audinet-Serville, 1835)
