= Laraesima brunneoscutellaris =

Scientific classification
- Kingdom: Animalia
- Phylum: Arthropoda
- Class: Insecta
- Order: Coleoptera
- Suborder: Polyphaga
- Infraorder: Cucujiformia
- Family: Cerambycidae
- Genus: Laraesima
- Species: L. brunneoscutellaris

Binomial name
- Laraesima brunneoscutellaris (Tippmann, 1960)

Synonyms
- Penessada brunneoscutellaris Tippmann, 1960

Species of beetle

Laraesima brunneoscutellaris is a species of beetle in the family Cerambycidae. It was described by Tippmann in 1960. It is known from Brazil.
