= Compsosoma geayi =

Scientific classification
- Domain: Eukaryota
- Kingdom: Animalia
- Phylum: Arthropoda
- Class: Insecta
- Order: Coleoptera
- Suborder: Polyphaga
- Infraorder: Cucujiformia
- Family: Cerambycidae
- Genus: Compsosoma
- Species: C. geayi

Binomial name
- Compsosoma geayi Gounelle, 1908

Species of beetle

Compsosoma geayi is a species of beetle in the family Cerambycidae. It was described by Gounelle in 1908. It is known from Brazil and French Guiana.
