= Antennaerenea =

Scientific classification
- Kingdom: Animalia
- Phylum: Arthropoda
- Class: Insecta
- Order: Coleoptera
- Suborder: Polyphaga
- Infraorder: Cucujiformia
- Family: Cerambycidae
- Tribe: Compsosomatini
- Genus: Antennaerenea
- Species: A. niveosignata

Binomial name
- Antennaerenea niveosignata Breuning, 1980

Genus of beetles

Antennaerenea is a genus of beetles in the family Cerambycidae, containing a single species, Antennaerenea niveosignata. It was described by Breuning in 1980.
