= Laraesima densepunctata =

Scientific classification
- Kingdom: Animalia
- Phylum: Arthropoda
- Class: Insecta
- Order: Coleoptera
- Suborder: Polyphaga
- Infraorder: Cucujiformia
- Family: Cerambycidae
- Genus: Laraesima
- Species: L. densepunctata

Binomial name
- Laraesima densepunctata Breuning, 1950

Species of beetle

Laraesima densepunctata is a species of beetle in the family Cerambycidae. It was described by Stephan von Breuning in 1950. It is known from Brazil.
