= Compsosoma vestitipenne =

Scientific classification
- Domain: Eukaryota
- Kingdom: Animalia
- Phylum: Arthropoda
- Class: Insecta
- Order: Coleoptera
- Suborder: Polyphaga
- Infraorder: Cucujiformia
- Family: Cerambycidae
- Genus: Compsosoma
- Species: C. vestitipenne

Binomial name
- Compsosoma vestitipenne Zajciw, 1962

Species of beetle

Compsosoma vestitipenne is a species of beetle in the family Cerambycidae. It was described by Dmytro Zajciw in 1962. It is known from Brazil.
