= Tessarecphora =

Scientific classification
- Kingdom: Animalia
- Phylum: Arthropoda
- Class: Insecta
- Order: Coleoptera
- Suborder: Polyphaga
- Infraorder: Cucujiformia
- Family: Cerambycidae
- Genus: Tessarecphora
- Species: T. arachnoides

Binomial name
- Tessarecphora arachnoides Thomson, 1857

Genus of beetles

Tessarecphora arachnoides is a species of beetle in the family Cerambycidae and the only species in the genus Tessarecphora. It was described by Thomson in 1857.
