= Desmiphoropsis variegata =

Scientific classification
- Kingdom: Animalia
- Phylum: Arthropoda
- Class: Insecta
- Order: Coleoptera
- Suborder: Polyphaga
- Infraorder: Cucujiformia
- Family: Cerambycidae
- Genus: Desmiphoropsis
- Species: D. variegata

Binomial name
- Desmiphoropsis variegata (Audinet-Serville, 1835)

Synonyms
- Compsosoma alboapicale Breuning, 1980; Compsosoma variegatum Audinet-Serville, 1835; Compsosoma alboapicalis Breuning, 1980 (misspelling); Compsosoma variegata Audinet-Serville, 1835 (misspelling)

Species of beetle

Desmiphoropsis variegata is a species of beetle in the family Cerambycidae. It was described by Audinet-Serville in 1835. It is known from Argentina and Brazil.
