= Parapythais =

Scientific classification
- Kingdom: Animalia
- Phylum: Arthropoda
- Class: Insecta
- Order: Coleoptera
- Suborder: Polyphaga
- Infraorder: Cucujiformia
- Family: Cerambycidae
- Genus: Parapythais
- Species: P. melzeri

Binomial name
- Parapythais melzeri Monné, 1980

Genus of beetles

Parapythais melzeri is a species of beetle in the family Cerambycidae, and the only species in the genus Parapythais. It was described by Monné in 1980.
