= Cristaerenea =

Scientific classification
- Kingdom: Animalia
- Phylum: Arthropoda
- Clade: Pancrustacea
- Class: Insecta
- Order: Coleoptera
- Suborder: Polyphaga
- Infraorder: Cucujiformia
- Family: Cerambycidae
- Genus: Cristaerenea
- Species: C. cognata

Binomial name
- Cristaerenea cognata (Pascoe, 1859)

Genus of beetles

Cristaerenea cognata is a species of beetle in the family Cerambycidae, and the only species in the genus Cristaerenea. It was described by Pascoe in 1859.
