= Eusphaerium =

Scientific classification
- Kingdom: Animalia
- Phylum: Arthropoda
- Class: Insecta
- Order: Coleoptera
- Suborder: Polyphaga
- Infraorder: Cucujiformia
- Family: Cerambycidae
- Genus: Eusphaerium
- Species: E. purpureum

Binomial name
- Eusphaerium purpureum Newmann, 1838

Genus of beetles

Eusphaerium purpureum is a species of beetle in the family Cerambycidae, and the only species in the genus Eusphaerium. It was described by Newmann in 1838.
