= Paracompsosoma =

Scientific classification
- Kingdom: Animalia
- Phylum: Arthropoda
- Class: Insecta
- Order: Coleoptera
- Suborder: Polyphaga
- Infraorder: Cucujiformia
- Family: Cerambycidae
- Genus: Paracompsosoma; Breuning, 1948
- Species: P. humerale

Binomial name
- Paracompsosoma humerale Breuning, 1948

Genus of beetles

Paracompsosoma humerale is a species of beetle in the family Cerambycidae, and the only species in the genus Paracompsosoma. It was described by Breuning in 1948.
