= Hadrian =

Roman emperor from 117 to 138

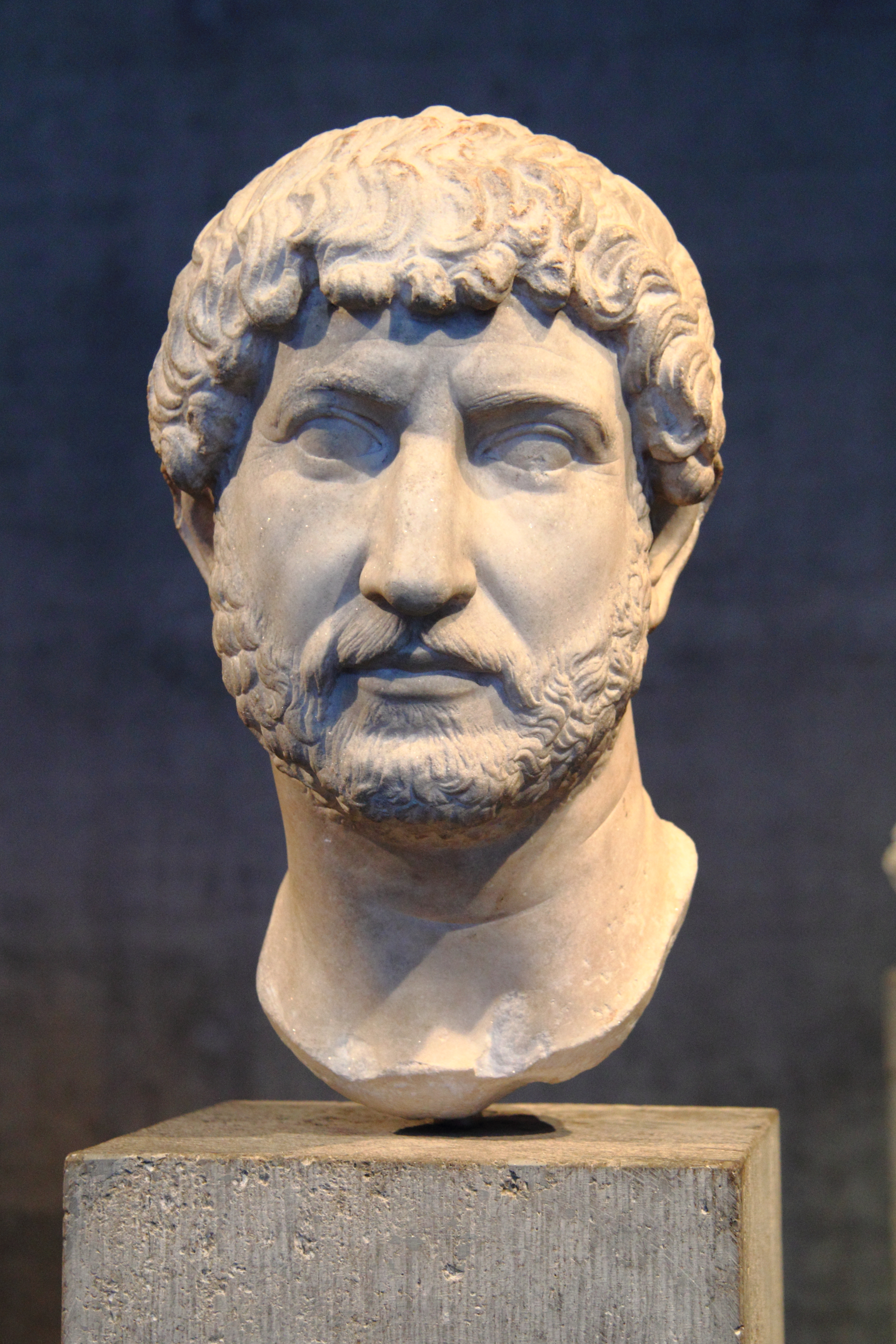
- Bust of Hadrian, c. 130; Glyptothek, Munich

Roman emperor
- Reign: 11 August 117 – 10 July 138
- Predecessor: Trajan
- Successor: Antoninus Pius
- Born: Publius Aelius Hadrianus; 24 January 76; Italica, Hispania Baetica, Roman Empire (present-day Santiponce, Spain)
- Died: 10 July 138 (aged 62); Baiae, Italia, Roman Empire
- Burial: Puteoli; Gardens of Domitia; Hadrian's Mausoleum
- Spouse: Vibia Sabina
- Adoptive children: Lucius Aelius Caesar; Antoninus Pius
Regnal name
- Imperator Caesar Trajanus Hadrianus Augustus
- Dynasty: Nerva–Antonine
- Father: Publius Aelius Hadrianus Afer; Trajan (adoptive)
- Mother: Domitia Paulina Major
- Religion: Hellenistic religion

Hadrian (/ˈheɪdriən/ HAY-dree-ən; born Publius Aelius Hadrianus, 24 January 76 – 10 July 138) was the Roman emperor from 117 to 138. His form of address as Roman emperor was Imperator Caesar Traianus Hadrianus Augustus. Hadrian was born in Italica, in the present-day Andalusian province of Seville in southern Spain, an Italic settlement in Hispania Baetica; his gens Aelia came from the town of Hadria in central Italy. He was a member of the Nerva–Antonine dynasty.

Early in his political career, Hadrian married Vibia Sabina, grandniece of the ruling emperor, Trajan, and his second cousin once removed. The marriage and Hadrian's later succession as emperor were probably promoted by Trajan's wife Pompeia Plotina. Soon after his succession, Hadrian had four leading senators unlawfully put to death, most likely because they seemed to threaten the security of his reign; this earned him the senate's lifelong enmity. He earned further disapproval by abandoning Trajan's expansionist policies and territorial gains in Mesopotamia, Assyria, Armenia, and parts of Dacia. Hadrian preferred to invest in the development of stable, defensible borders and the unification of the Roman empire's disparate peoples and subjects. He was a promoter of philhellenism.

Hadrian energetically pursued his Imperial ideals and personal interests. He visited almost every province of the Empire, and indulged a preference for direct intervention in imperial and provincial affairs, especially building projects. He is particularly known for building Hadrian's Wall, which marked the northern limit of Britannia. In Rome, he rebuilt the Pantheon and constructed the vast Temple of Venus and Roma, as well as the Villa Adriana in Tivoli. In Egypt, he may have rebuilt the Serapeum of Alexandria. As an ardent admirer of Greek culture, he promoted Athens as the cultural capital of the Empire. His intense relationship with a Greek youth, Antinous and the latter's untimely death led Hadrian to establish a widespread, popular cult. Late in Hadrian's reign, he suppressed the Bar Kokhba Revolt, which he saw as a failure of his universal project and philhellenic ideal.

Hadrian's last years were marred by chronic illness. His marriage had been both unhappy and childless. In 138, he adopted Antoninus Pius and nominated him as a successor, on condition that Antoninus adopt Marcus Aurelius and Lucius Verus as his heirs. Hadrian died the same year at Baiae, and Antoninus had him deified, despite opposition from the Senate. Later historians counted him as one of Rome's so-called "Five Good Emperors" and as a benevolent autocrat. His Senate found him remote and authoritarian. He has been described as enigmatic and contradictory, with a capacity for great generosity and extreme cruelty and driven by insatiable curiosity, conceit, and ambition.

== Early life ==
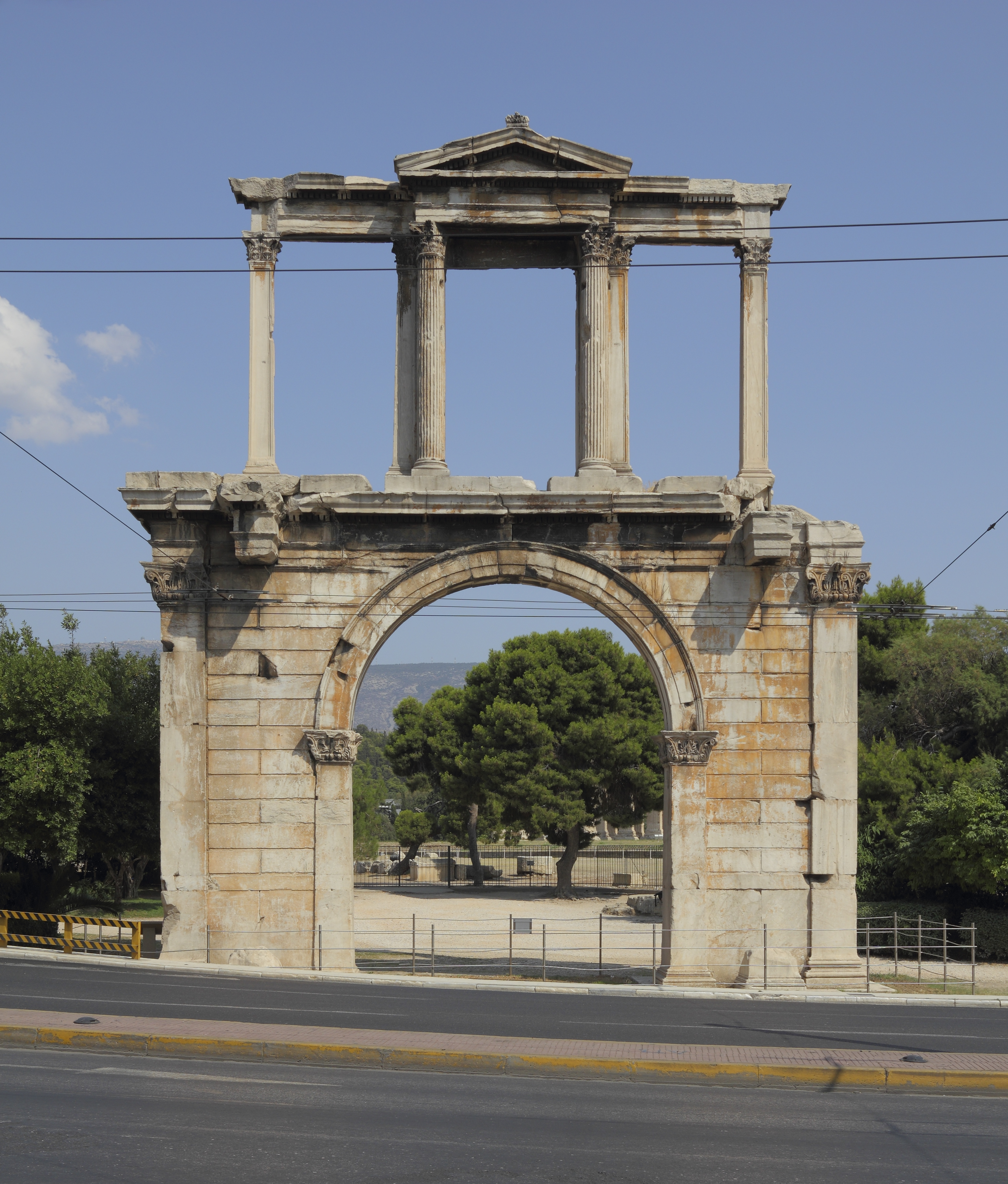
Hadrian's Arch in central Athens, Greece. Hadrian's admiration for Greece materialised in such projects ordered during his reign

Publius Aelius Hadrianus was born on 24 January 76, in Italica (modern Santiponce, near Seville), a Roman town founded by Italic settlers in the province of Hispania Baetica during the Second Punic War at the initiative of Scipio Africanus; Hadrian's branch of the Aelia gens came from Hadria (modern Atri), an ancient town in the Picenum region of Italia, the source of the name Hadrianus. One Roman biographer claims instead that Hadrian was born in Rome, but this view is held by a minority of scholars.

Hadrian's father was Publius Aelius Hadrianus Afer, a senator of praetorian rank, born and raised in Italica. Hadrian's mother was Domitia Paulina, daughter of a distinguished Roman senatorial family based in Gades (Cádiz). His only sibling was an elder sister, Aelia Domitia Paulina. His wet nurse was the slave Germana, probably of Germanic origin, to whom he was devoted throughout his life. He later freed her, and she ultimately outlived him, as shown by her funerary inscription, which was found at Hadrian's Villa at Tivoli. Hadrian's great-nephew, Gnaeus Pedanius Fuscus Salinator, from Barcino (Barcelona) would become Hadrian's colleague as co-consul in 118. As a senator, Hadrian's father would have spent much of his time in Rome. In terms of his later career, Hadrian's most significant family connection was to Trajan, his father's first cousin, who was also of senatorial stock and a native of Italica. Although they were considered to be, in the words of Aurelius Victor, advenae ("aliens", people "from the outside"), both Trajan and Hadrian were of Italic lineage and belonged to the upper class of Roman society. One author has proposed to consider them part of the "Ulpio-Aelian dynasty".

Hadrian's parents died in 86 when he was ten years old. He and his sister became wards of Trajan and Publius Acilius Attianus (who later became Trajan's Praetorian prefect). Hadrian was physically active and enjoyed hunting; when he was 14, Trajan called him to Rome and arranged his further education in subjects appropriate to a young Roman aristocrat. Hadrian's enthusiasm for Greek literature and culture earned him the nickname Graeculus ("Greekling"), intended as a form of "mild mockery".

== Public service ==
Hadrian's first official post in Rome was as a member of the decemviri stlitibus judicandis, one among many vigintivirate offices at the lowest level of the cursus honorum ("course of honours") that could lead to higher office and a senatorial career. He then served as a military tribune, first with the Legio II Adiutrix in 95, then with the Legio V Macedonica. During Hadrian's second stint as tribune, the frail and aged reigning emperor Nerva adopted Trajan as his heir; Hadrian was dispatched to give Trajan the news – or most probably was one of many emissaries charged with this same commission. Then Hadrian was transferred to Legio XXII Primigenia and a third tribunate. Hadrian's three tribunates gave him some career advantage. Most scions of the older senatorial families might serve one, or at most two, military tribunates as a prerequisite to higher office. When Nerva died in 98, Hadrian is said to have hastened to Trajan, to inform him ahead of the official envoy sent by the governor, Hadrian's brother-in-law and rival Lucius Julius Ursus Servianus.

In 101, Hadrian was back in Rome; he was elected quaestor, then quaestor imperatoris Traiani, liaison officer between Emperor and the assembled Senate, to whom he read the Emperor's communiqués and speeches – which he possibly composed on the emperor's behalf. His next post was as ab actis senatus, keeping the Senate's records. During the First Dacian War, Hadrian took the field as a member of Trajan's personal entourage, but was excused from his military post to take office in Rome as tribune of the plebs, in 105. After the war, he was probably elected praetor. During the Second Dacian War, Hadrian was in Trajan's personal service again. He was released to serve as legate of Legio I Minervia, then as governor of Lower Pannonia in 107, tasked with "holding back the Sarmatians". Between 107 and 108, Hadrian defeated an invasion of Roman-controlled Banat and Oltenia by the Iazyges tribe. The exact terms of the peace treaty are not known. It is believed the Romans kept Oltenia in exchange for some form of concession, likely involving a one-time tribute payment. The Iazyges also took possession of Banat around this time, which may have been part of the treaty. By 108 became the imperial ghostwriter, taking the place of the recently deceased Lucius Licinius Sura, Trajan's all-powerful friend and kingmaker.

Now in his mid-thirties, Hadrian travelled to Greece; he was granted Athenian citizenship and was appointed eponymous archon of Athens for a brief time in 112. The Athenians awarded him a statue with an inscription in the Theatre of Dionysus (IG II2 3286) offering a detailed account of his cursus honorum thus far. Thereafter, no more is heard of him until Trajan's Parthian campaign. It is possible that he remained in Greece until his recall to the imperial retinue, when he joined Trajan's expedition against Parthia as a legate. When the governor of Syria was sent to deal with renewed troubles in Dacia, Hadrian was appointed his replacement, with independent command. Trajan became seriously ill, and took ship for Rome, while Hadrian remained in Syria, de facto general commander of the Eastern Roman army. Trajan got as far as the coastal city of Selinus, in Cilicia, and died there on 8 August 117; he would be regarded as one of Rome's best, most admired, and most popular emperors.

=== Relationship with Trajan and his family ===
Around the time of his quaestorship, in 100 or 101, Hadrian had married Trajan's seventeen- or eighteen-year-old grandniece, Vibia Sabina, who was his second cousin once removed. Trajan himself seems to have been less than enthusiastic about the marriage, and with good reason, as the couple's relationship would prove to be scandalously poor. The marriage might have been arranged by Trajan's empress, Plotina. This highly cultured, influential woman shared many of Hadrian's values and interests, including the idea of the Roman Empire as a commonwealth with an underlying Hellenic culture. If Hadrian were to be appointed Trajan's successor, Plotina and her extended family could retain their social profile and political influence after Trajan's death. Hadrian could also count on the support of his mother-in-law, Salonia Matidia, who was the daughter of Trajan's beloved sister Ulpia Marciana. When Ulpia Marciana died in 112, Trajan had her deified, and made Salonia Matidia an Augusta.

Bust of Emperor Trajan; Musée Saint-Raymond, Toulouse

Hadrian's personal relationship with Trajan was complex and may have been difficult. Hadrian seems to have sought influence over Trajan, or Trajan's decisions, through cultivation of the latter's boy favourites; this gave rise to some unexplained quarrel, around the time of Hadrian's marriage to Sabina. Late in Trajan's reign, Hadrian failed to achieve a senior consulship, being only suffect consul for 108; this gave him parity of status with other members of the senatorial nobility, but no particular distinction befitting an heir designate. Had Trajan wished it, he could have promoted his protege to patrician rank and its privileges, which included opportunities for a fast track to consulship without prior experience as tribune; he chose not to. While Hadrian seems to have been granted the office of tribune of the plebs a year or so younger than was customary, he had to leave Dacia, and Trajan, to take up the appointment; Trajan might simply have wanted him out of the way. The Historia Augusta describes Trajan's gift to Hadrian of a diamond ring that Trajan himself had received from Nerva, which "encouraged [Hadrian's] hopes of succeeding to the throne". While Trajan actively promoted Hadrian's advancement, he did so with caution.

=== Succession ===
Failure to nominate an heir could invite chaotic, destructive wresting of power by a succession of competing claimants – a civil war. Too early a nomination could be seen as an abdication and reduce the chance for an orderly transmission of power. As Trajan lay dying, nursed by his wife, Plotina, and closely watched by Prefect Attianus, he could have lawfully adopted Hadrian as heir by means of a simple deathbed wish, expressed before witnesses; but when an adoption document was eventually presented, it was signed not by Trajan but by Plotina. That Hadrian was still in Syria was a further irregularity, as Roman adoption law required the presence of both parties at the adoption ceremony. Rumours, doubts, and speculation attended Hadrian's adoption and succession. It has been suggested that Trajan's young manservant Phaedimus, who died very soon after Trajan, was killed (or killed himself) rather than face awkward questions. Ancient sources are divided on the legitimacy of Hadrian's adoption: Cassius Dio saw it as bogus and the Historia Augusta writer as genuine. An aureus minted early in Hadrian's reign represents the official position; it presents Hadrian as Trajan's "Caesar" (Trajan's heir designate).

== Emperor (117) ==
=== Securing power ===
The Roman Empire in 125, under the rule of Hadrian

According to the Historia Augusta, Hadrian informed the Senate of his accession in a letter as a fait accompli, explaining that "the unseemly haste of the troops in acclaiming him emperor was due to the belief that the state could not be without an emperor". The new emperor rewarded the legions' loyalty with the customary bonus, and the Senate endorsed the acclamation. Various public ceremonies were organised on Hadrian's behalf, celebrating his "divine election" by all the gods, whose community now included Trajan, deified at Hadrian's request.

Hadrian remained in the east for a while, suppressing the Jewish revolt that had broken out under Trajan. He relieved Judea's governor, the outstanding Moorish general Lusius Quietus, of his personal guard of Moorish auxiliaries; then he moved on to quell disturbances along the Danube frontier.

In Rome, Hadrian's former guardian and current praetorian prefect, Attianus, claimed to have uncovered a conspiracy involving Lusius Quietus and three other leading senators, Lucius Publilius Celsus, Aulus Cornelius Palma Frontonianus and Gaius Avidius Nigrinus. There was no public trial for the four – they were tried in absentia, hunted down and killed. Hadrian claimed that Attianus had acted on his own initiative, and rewarded him with senatorial status and consular rank; then pensioned him off, no later than 120. (Note: Hadrian may have been wary of the powerful prefect's ambition and might have used the reward as a mean to neutralise him; professor Antonio Caballos Rufino believes Attianus did not survive Hadrian.) Hadrian assured the senate that henceforth their ancient right to prosecute and judge their own would be respected. The reasons for these four executions remain obscure. Official recognition of Hadrian as a legitimate heir may have come too late to dissuade other potential claimants. Hadrian's greatest rivals were Trajan's closest friends, the most experienced and senior members of the imperial council; any of them might have been a legitimate competitor for the imperial office (capaces imperii); and any of them might have supported Trajan's expansionist policies, which Hadrian intended to change. One of their number was Aulus Cornelius Palma who as a former conqueror of Arabia Nabatea would have retained a stake in the East. The Historia Augusta describes Palma and a third executed senator, Lucius Publilius Celsus (consul for the second time in 113), as Hadrian's personal enemies, who had spoken in public against him. The fourth was Gaius Avidius Nigrinus, an ex-consul, intellectual, friend of Pliny the Younger and (briefly) Governor of Dacia at the start of Hadrian's reign. He was probably Hadrian's chief rival for the throne; a senator of the highest rank, breeding, and connections; according to the Historia Augusta, Hadrian had considered making Nigrinus his heir apparent before deciding to get rid of him.

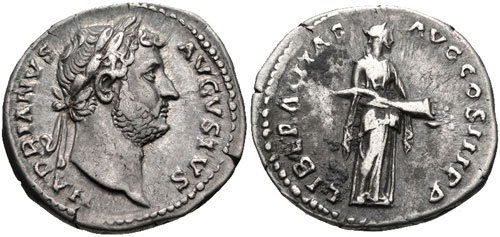
A denarius of Hadrian issued in 119 AD for his third consulship. The legends read as: HADRIANVS AVGVSTVS / LIBERALITAS AVG. CO[N]S III, P. P.

Soon after, in 125, Hadrian appointed Quintus Marcius Turbo as his Praetorian Prefect. Turbo was his close friend, a leading figure of the equestrian order, a senior court judge and a procurator. As Hadrian also forbade equestrians to try cases against senators, the Senate retained full legal authority over its members; it also remained the highest court of appeal, and formal appeals to the emperor regarding its decisions were forbidden. If this was an attempt to repair the damage done by Attianus, with or without Hadrian's full knowledge, it was not enough; Hadrian's reputation and relationship with his Senate were irredeemably soured, for the rest of his reign. Some sources describe Hadrian's occasional recourse to a network of informers, the frumentarii, to discreetly investigate persons of high social standing, including senators and his close friends.

== Travels ==
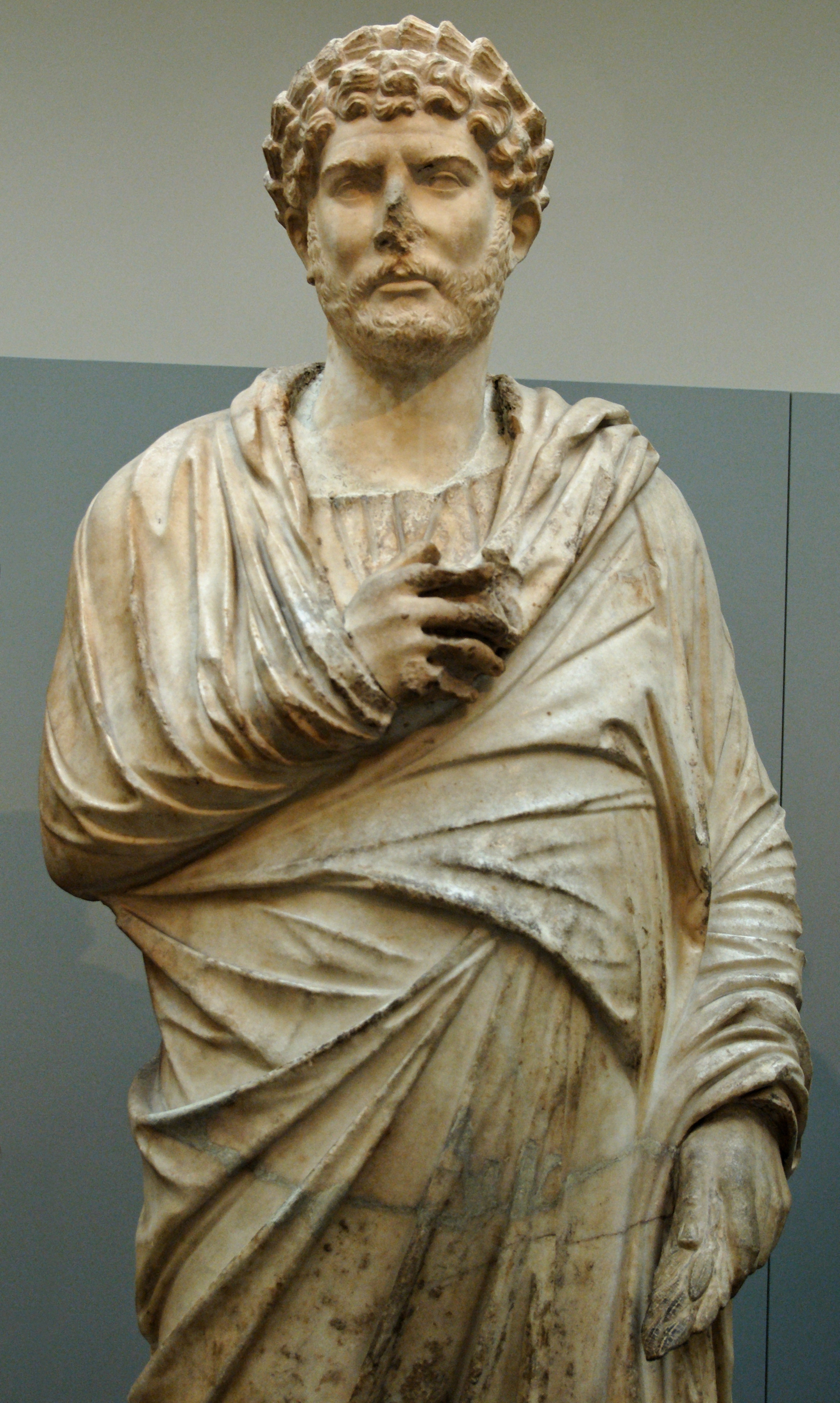
This statue of Hadrian in Greek dress was revealed in 2008 to have been forged in the Victorian era by cobbling together a head of Hadrian and an unknown body. For years, the statue had been used by historians as proof of Hadrian's love of Hellenic culture. British Museum, London

Hadrian was to spend more than half his reign outside Italy. Whereas previous emperors had, for the most part, relied on the reports of their imperial representatives around the Empire, Hadrian wished to see things for himself. Previous emperors had often left Rome for long periods, but mostly to go to war, returning once the conflict was settled. Hadrian's near-incessant travels may represent a calculated break with traditions and attitudes in which the empire was a purely Roman hegemony. Hadrian sought to include provincials in a commonwealth of civilised peoples and a common Hellenic culture under Roman supervision. He supported the creation of provincial towns (municipia), semi-autonomous urban communities with their own customs and laws, rather than the imposition of new Roman colonies with Roman constitutions.

A cosmopolitan, ecumenical intent is evident in coin issues of Hadrian's later reign, showing the emperor "raising up" the personifications of various provinces. Aelius Aristides would later write that Hadrian "extended over his subjects a protecting hand, raising them as one helps fallen men on their feet". All this did not go well with Roman traditionalists. The self-indulgent emperor Nero had enjoyed a prolonged and peaceful tour of Greece and had been criticised by the Roman elite for abandoning his fundamental responsibilities as emperor. In the eastern provinces, and to some extent in the west, Nero had enjoyed popular support; claims of his imminent return or rebirth emerged almost immediately after his death. Hadrian may have consciously exploited these positive, popular connections during his own travels. In the Historia Augusta, Hadrian is described as "a little too much Greek", too cosmopolitan for a Roman emperor.

=== Britannia and the West (122) ===
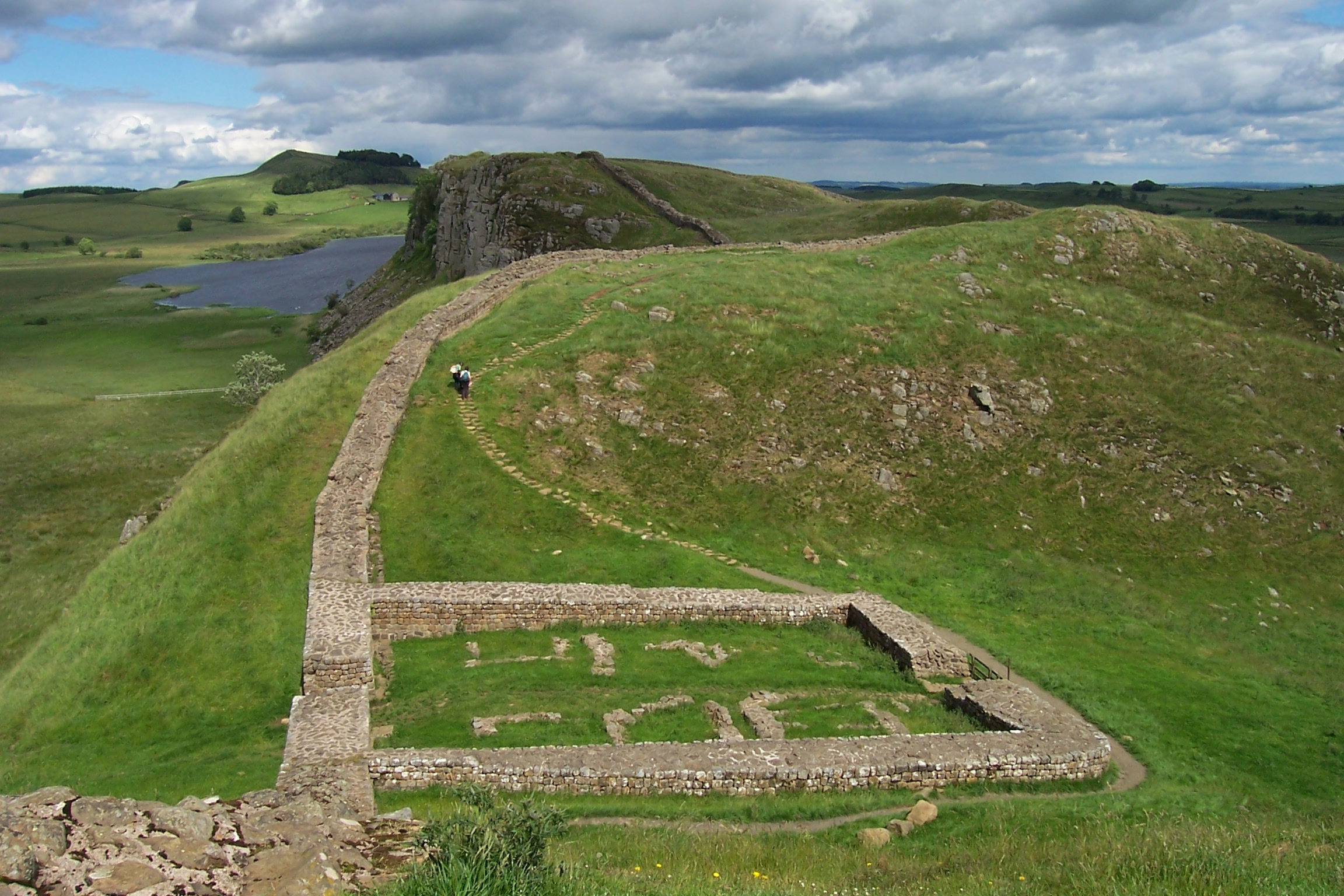
Hadrian's Wall, the Roman frontier fortification in northern England, looking east. Milecastle 39 is in the foreground. Scotland lies to the north, or left.

Prior to Hadrian's arrival in Britannia, the province had suffered a major rebellion from 118 to 119. Inscriptions tell of an expeditio Britannica that involved major troop movements, including the dispatch of a detachment (vexillatio), comprising some 3,000 soldiers. Fronto writes about military losses in Britannia at the time. Coin legends of 119–120 attest that Quintus Pompeius Falco was sent to restore order. In 122 Hadrian initiated the construction of a wall "to separate Romans from barbarians". The idea that the wall was built in order to deal with an actual threat or its resurgence, however, is probable but nevertheless conjectural. A general desire to cease the Empire's extension may have been the determining motive. Reduction of defence costs may also have played a role, as the Wall deterred attacks on Roman territory at a lower cost than a massed border army, and controlled cross-border trade and immigration. A shrine was erected in York to Britannia as the divine personification of Britain; coins were struck, bearing her image, which are identified as Britannia. By the end of 122, Hadrian had concluded his visit to Britannia. He never saw the finished wall that bears his name.

Hadrian appears to have continued through southern Gaul. At Nemausus, he may have overseen the building of a basilica dedicated to his patroness Plotina, who had recently died in Rome and had been deified at Hadrian's request. At around this time, Hadrian dismissed his secretary ab epistulis, the biographer Suetonius, for "excessive familiarity" towards the empress. Marcius Turbo's colleague as praetorian prefect, Gaius Septicius Clarus, was dismissed for the same alleged reason, perhaps a pretext to remove him from office. Hadrian spent the winter of 122/123 at Tarraco, in Spain, where he restored the Temple of Augustus.

=== Africa, Parthia (123) ===
In 123, Hadrian crossed the Mediterranean to Mauretania, where he personally led a minor campaign against local rebels. The visit was cut short by reports of war preparations by Parthia; Hadrian quickly headed eastwards. At some point, he visited Cyrene, where he personally funded the training of young men from well-bred families for the Roman military. Cyrene had benefited earlier in Hadrian's reign (in 119) from his restoration of public buildings destroyed during the earlier, Trajanic Jewish revolt. Birley describes this kind of investment as "characteristic of Hadrian".

=== Anatolia; Antinous (123–124) ===
When Hadrian arrived on the Euphrates, he personally negotiated a settlement with the Parthian King Osroes I, inspected the Roman defences, then set off westwards, along the Black Sea coast. He probably wintered in Nicomedia, the main city of Bithynia. Nicomedia had been hit by an earthquake only shortly before his stay; Hadrian provided funds for its rebuilding and was acclaimed as restorer of the province.

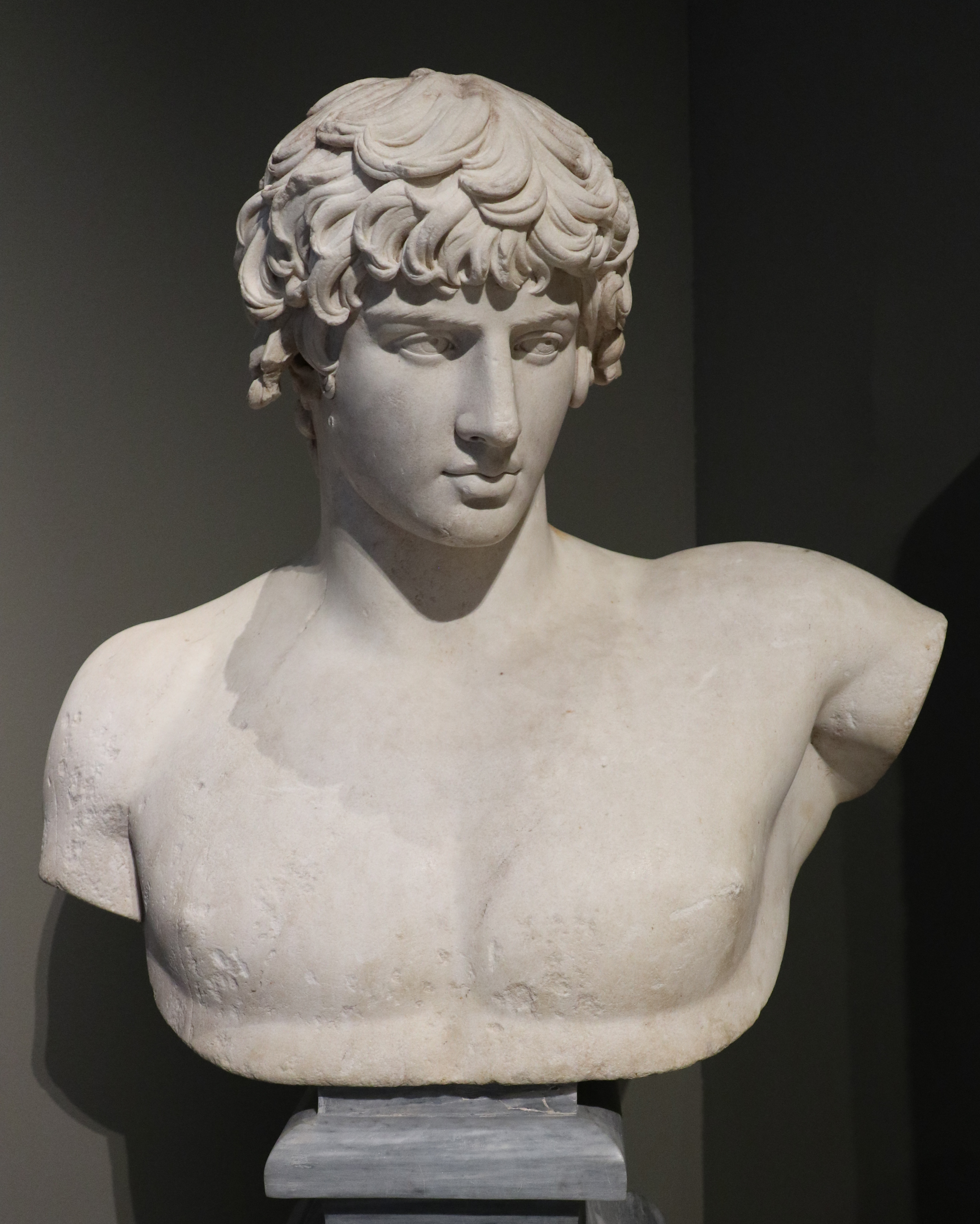
Bust of Antinous from Patras, National Archaeological Museum, Athens

It is possible that Hadrian visited Claudiopolis and saw the beautiful Antinous, a young man of humble birth who became Hadrian's lover. Literary and epigraphic sources say nothing of when or where they met; depictions of Antinous show him aged 20 or so, shortly before his death in 130. In 123, he would most likely have been a youth of 13 or 14. It is also possible that Antinous was sent to Rome to be trained as a page to serve the emperor and only gradually rose to the status of imperial favourite. The actual historical detail of their relationship is mostly unknown.

With or without Antinous, Hadrian travelled through Anatolia. Various traditions suggest his presence at particular locations and allege his foundation of a city within Mysia, Hadrianutherae, after a successful boar hunt. At about this time, plans to complete the Temple of Zeus in Cyzicus, begun by the kings of Pergamon, were put into practice. The temple received a colossal statue of Hadrian. Cyzicus, Pergamon, Smyrna, Ephesus and Sardes were promoted as regional centres for the imperial cult (neocoros).

=== Greece (124–125) ===
Hadrian arrived in Greece during the autumn of 124 and participated in the Eleusinian Mysteries. He had a particular commitment to Athens, which had previously granted him citizenship and an archonate; at the Athenians' request, he revised their constitution – among other things, he added a new phyle (tribe), which was named after him. Hadrian combined active, hands-on interventions with cautious restraint. He refused to intervene in a local dispute between producers of olive oil and the Athenian Assembly and Council, who had imposed production quotas on oil producers; yet he granted an imperial subsidy for the Athenian grain supply. Hadrian created two foundations to fund Athens' public games, festivals and competitions if no citizen proved wealthy or willing enough to sponsor them as a Gymnasiarch or Agonothetes. Generally Hadrian preferred that Greek notables, including priests of the imperial cult, focus on more essential and durable provisions, especially munera such as aqueducts and public fountains (nymphaea). Athens was given two nymphaea; one brought water from Mount Parnes to the Athenia Agora via a complex, challenging and ambitious system of aqueduct tunnels and reservoirs, to be constructed over several years. Several were given to Argos, to remedy a water-shortage so severe and so long-standing that "thirsty Argos" featured in Homeric epic.

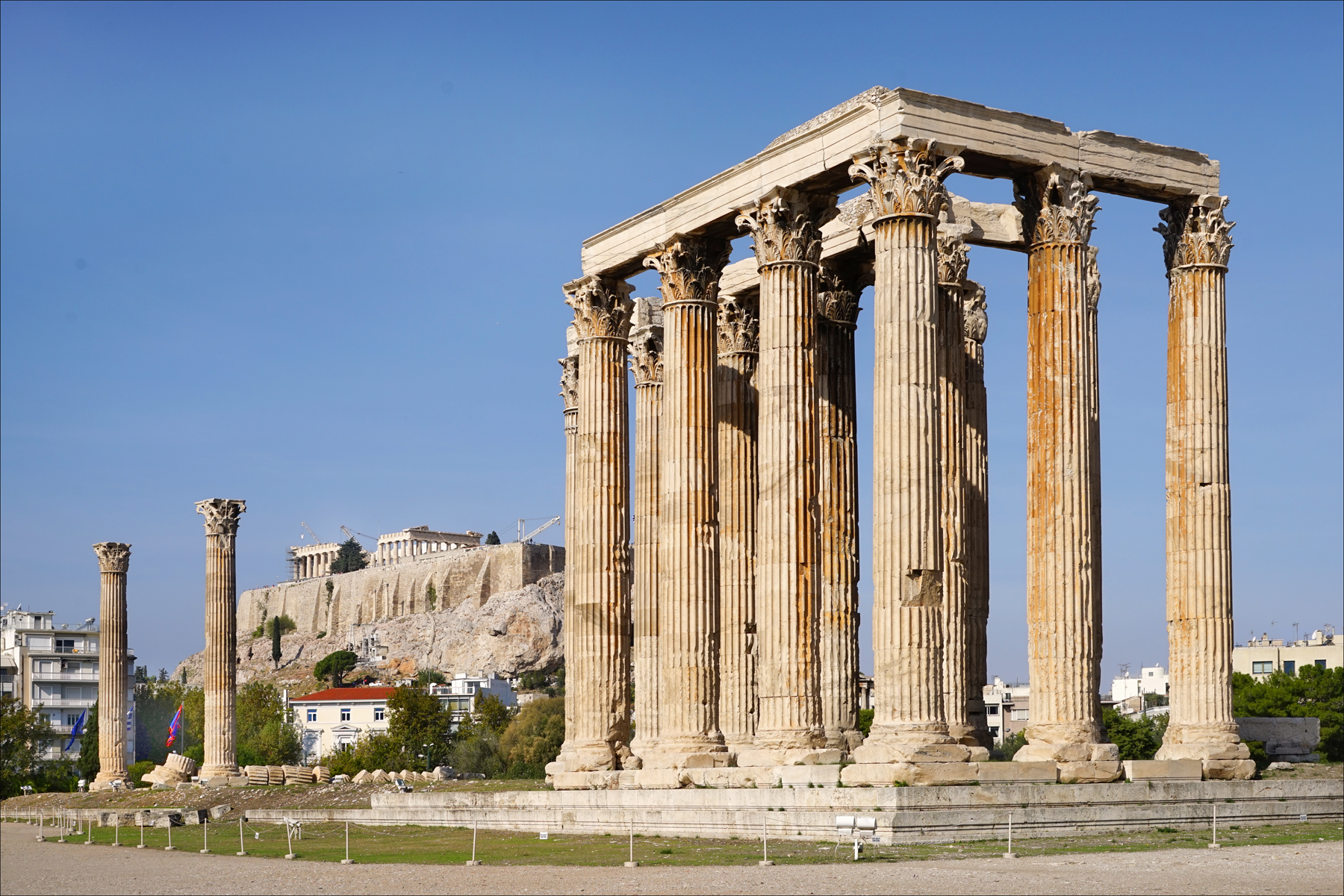
The Temple of Olympian Zeus, Athens, completed under Emperor Hadrian in 131

During that winter, Hadrian toured the Peloponnese. His exact route is uncertain, but it took in Epidaurus; Pausanias describes temples built there by Hadrian, and his statue – in heroic nudity – erected by its citizens in thanks to their "restorer". Antinous and Hadrian may have already been lovers at this time; Hadrian showed particular generosity to Mantinea, which shared ancient, mythic, politically useful links with Antinous' home at Bithynia. He restored Mantinea's Temple of Poseidon Hippios, and according to Pausanias, restored the city's original, classical name. It had been renamed Antigoneia since Hellenistic times, after the Macedonian King Antigonus III Doson. Hadrian also rebuilt the ancient shrines of Abae and Megara, and the Heraion of Argos.

During his tour of the Peloponnese, Hadrian persuaded the Spartan grandee Eurycles Herculanus – leader of the Euryclid family that had ruled Sparta since Augustus' day – to enter the Senate, alongside the Athenian grandee Herodes Atticus the Elder. The two aristocrats would be the first from "Old Greece" to enter the Roman Senate, as representatives of Sparta and Athens, traditional rivals and "great powers" of the Classical Age. This was an important step in overcoming Greek notables' reluctance to take part in Roman political life. In March 125, Hadrian presided at the Athenian festival of Dionysia, wearing Athenian dress. The Temple of Olympian Zeus had been under construction for more than five centuries; Hadrian committed the vast resources at his command to ensure that the job would be finished.

=== Return to Italy and trip to Africa (126–128) ===
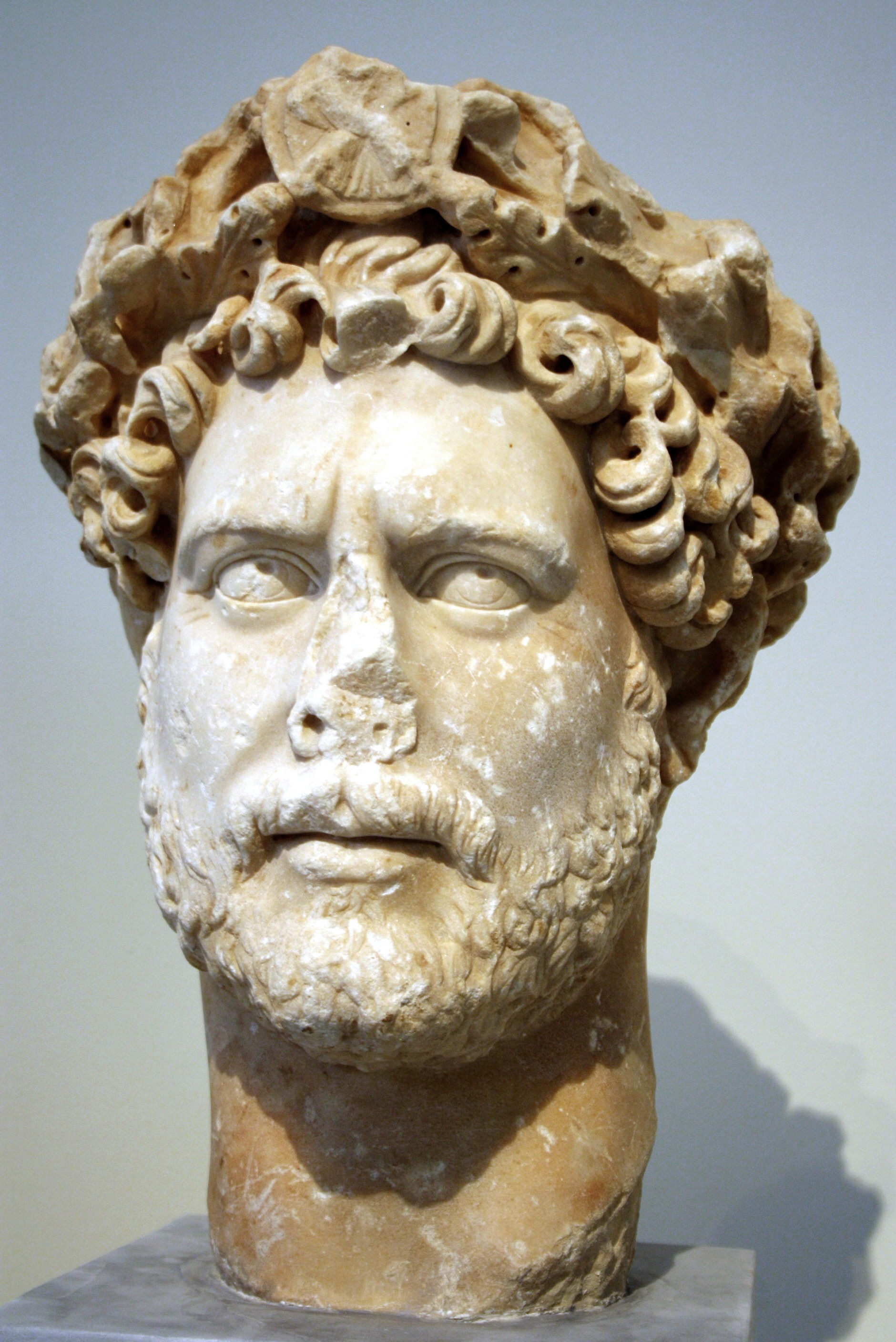
Colossal portrait bust of the emperor Hadrian with a wreath of oak leaves (AD 117–138); Pentelic marble, found in Athens, National Archaeological Museum, Athens

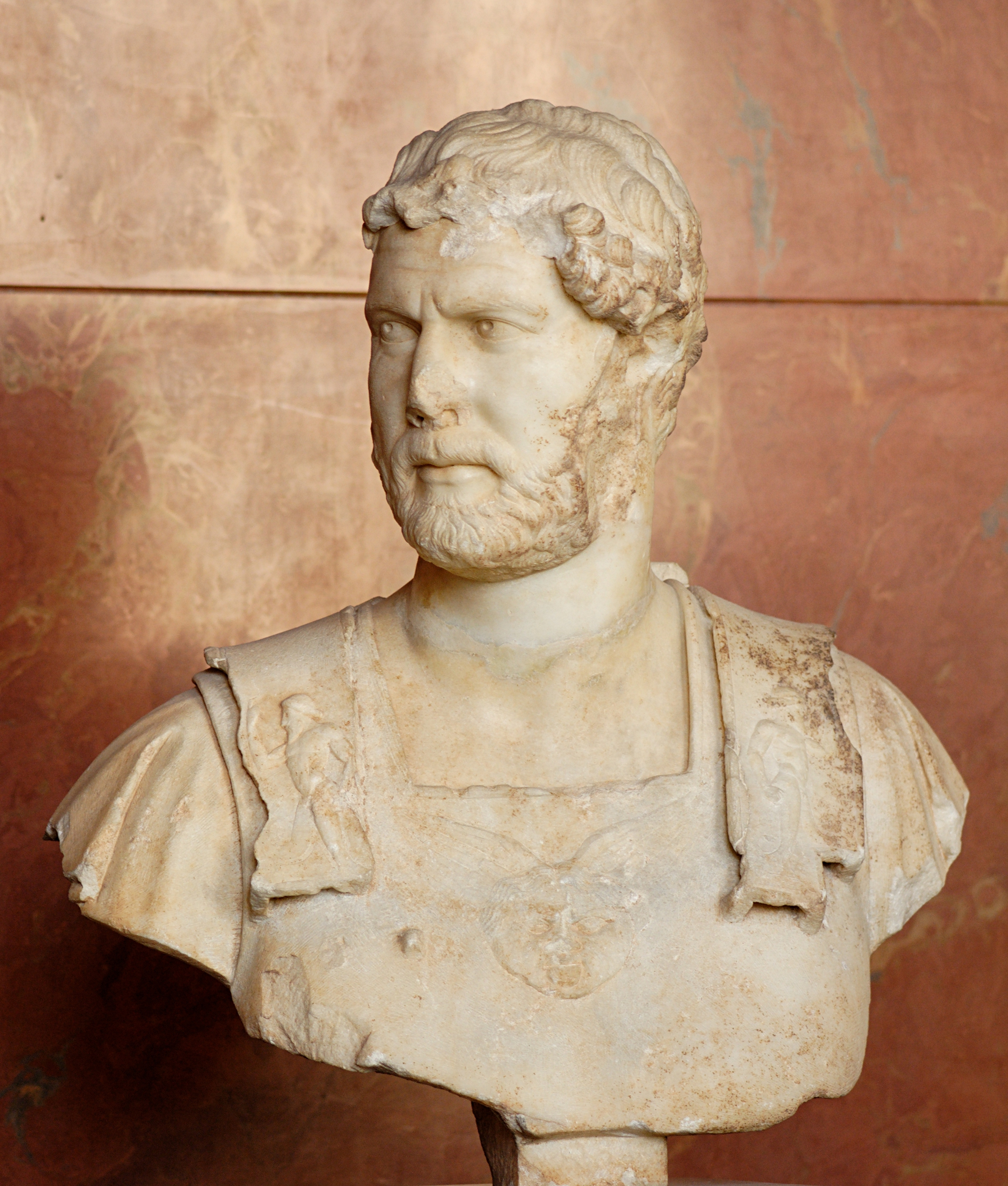
Hadrian in armour, wearing the gorgoneion on his breastplate; marble, Roman artwork, c. 127–128 AD, from Heraklion, Crete, now in the Louvre, Paris

On his return to Italy, Hadrian made a detour to Sicily. Coins celebrate him as the restorer of the island. Back in Rome, he saw the rebuilt Pantheon and his completed villa at nearby Tibur, among the Sabine Hills. In early March 127 Hadrian set off on a tour of Italy; his route has been reconstructed through the evidence of his gifts and donations. He restored the shrine of Cupra in Cupra Maritima and improved the drainage of the Fucine lake. Less welcome than such largesse was his decision in 127 to divide Italy into four regions under imperial legates with consular rank, acting as governors. They were given jurisdiction over all of Italy, excluding Rome itself, therefore shifting Italian cases from the courts of Rome. Having Italy effectively reduced to the status of a group of mere provinces did not go down well with the Roman Senate, and the innovation did not long outlive Hadrian's reign.

Hadrian fell ill around this time; whatever the nature of his illness, it did not stop him from setting off in the spring of 128 to visit Africa. His arrival coincided with the good omen of rain, which ended a drought. Along with his usual role as benefactor and restorer, he found time to inspect the troops; his speech to them survives. Hadrian returned to Italy in the summer of 128, but his stay was brief, as he set off on another tour that would last three years.

=== Greece, Asia, and Egypt (128–130); Antinous's death ===
In September 128, Hadrian attended the Eleusinian Mysteries again. This time his visit to Greece seems to have concentrated on Athens and Sparta – the two ancient rivals for dominance of Greece. Hadrian had played with the idea of focusing his Greek revival around the Amphictyonic League based in Delphi, but by now he had decided on something far grander. His new Panhellenion was going to be a council that would bring Greek cities together. Having set in motion the preparations – deciding whose claim to be a Greek city was genuine would take time – Hadrian set off for Ephesus. From Greece, Hadrian proceeded by way of Asia to Egypt, probably conveyed across the Aegean with his entourage by an Ephesian merchant, Lucius Erastus. Hadrian later sent a letter to the Council of Ephesus, supporting Erastus as a worthy candidate for town councillor and offering to pay the requisite fee.

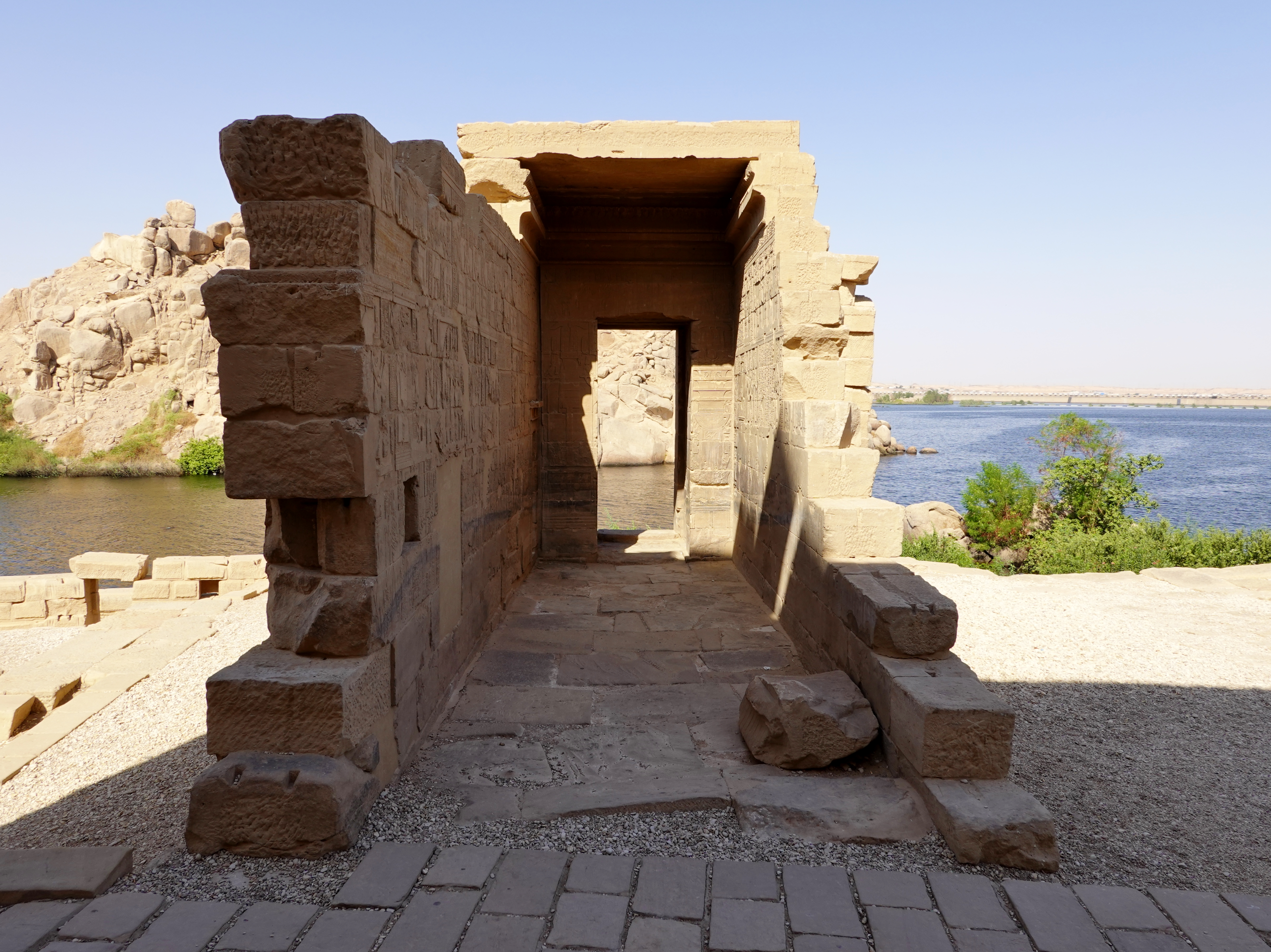
The Gateway of Hadrian in Philae

Hadrian arrived in Egypt before the Egyptian New Year on 29 August 130. He opened his stay in Egypt by restoring Pompey the Great's tomb at Pelusium, offering sacrifice to him as a hero and composing an epigraph for the tomb. As Pompey was universally acknowledged as responsible for establishing Rome's power in the east, this restoration was probably linked to a need to reaffirm Roman Eastern hegemony following social unrest there during Trajan's late reign. Hadrian and Antinous held a lion hunt in the Libyan desert; a poem on the subject by the Greek Pankrates is the earliest evidence that they travelled together.

While Hadrian and his entourage were sailing on the Nile, Antinous drowned. The exact circumstances surrounding his death are unknown, and accident, suicide, murder and religious sacrifice have all been postulated. Historia Augusta offers the following account:

During a journey on the Nile he lost Antinous, his favourite, and for this youth he wept like a woman. Concerning this incident there are varying rumours; for some claim that he had devoted himself to death for Hadrian, and others – what both his beauty and Hadrian's sensuality suggest. But however this may be, the Greeks deified him at Hadrian's request, and declared that oracles were given through his agency, but these, it is commonly asserted, were composed by Hadrian himself.

Hadrian founded the city of Antinoöpolis in Antinous' honour on 30 October 130. He then continued down the Nile to Thebes, where his visit to the Colossi of Memnon on 20 and 21 November was commemorated by four epigrams inscribed by Julia Balbilla. After that, he headed north, reaching the Fayyum at the beginning of December.

=== Greece and the East (130–132) ===
Arch of Hadrian in Jerash, Transjordan, built to honour Hadrian's visit in 130

Hadrian's movements after his journey down the Nile are uncertain. Whether or not he returned to Rome, he travelled in the East during 130–131, to organise and inaugurate his new Panhellenion, which was to be focused on the Athenian Temple to Olympian Zeus. As local conflicts had led to the failure of the previous scheme for a Hellenic association centered on Delphi, Hadrian decided instead for a grand league of all Greek cities. Successful applications for membership involved mythologised or fabricated claims to Greek origins, and affirmations of loyalty to imperial Rome, to satisfy Hadrian's personal, idealised notions of Hellenism. Hadrian saw himself as protector of Greek culture and the "liberties" of Greece – in this case, urban self-government. It allowed Hadrian to appear as the fictive heir to Pericles, who supposedly had convened a previous Panhellenic Congress – such a Congress is mentioned only in Pericles' biography by Plutarch, who respected Rome's imperial order.

Epigraphical evidence suggests that the prospect of applying to the Panhellenion held little attraction to the wealthier, Hellenised cities of Asia Minor, which were jealous of Athenian and European Greek preeminence within Hadrian's scheme. Hadrian's notion of Hellenism was narrow and deliberately archaising; he defined "Greekness" in terms of classical roots, rather than a broader, Hellenistic culture. Some cities with a dubious claim to Greekness, however – such as Side – were acknowledged as fully Hellenic. The German sociologist Georg Simmel remarked that the Panhellenion was based on "games, commemorations, preservation of an ideal, an entirely non-political Hellenism".

Hadrian bestowed honorific titles on many regional centres. Palmyra received a state visit and was given the civic name Hadriana Palmyra. Hadrian also bestowed honours on various Palmyrene magnates, among them one Soados, who had done much to protect Palmyrene trade between the Roman Empire and Parthia.

Hadrian had spent the winter of 131–32 in Athens, where he dedicated the now-completed Temple of Olympian Zeus, At some time in 132, he headed East, to Judaea.

=== Third Roman–Jewish War (132–136) ===
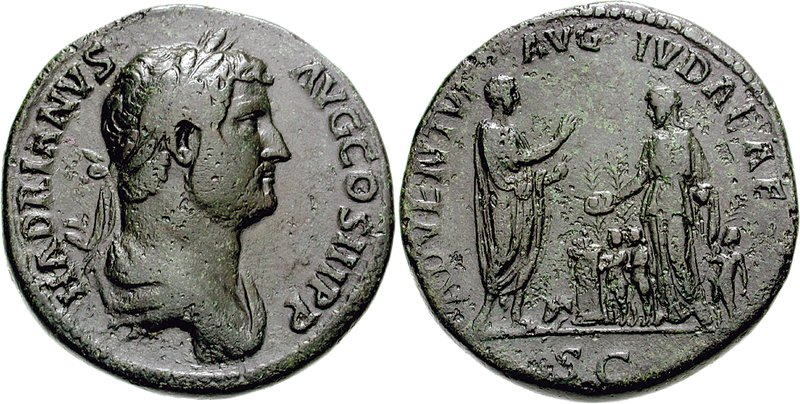
Coinage minted to mark Hadrian's visit to Judea. The legends read as: HADRIANVS AVG. CO[N]S. III, P. P. / ADVENTVI (arrival) AVG. IVDAEAE – S. C.

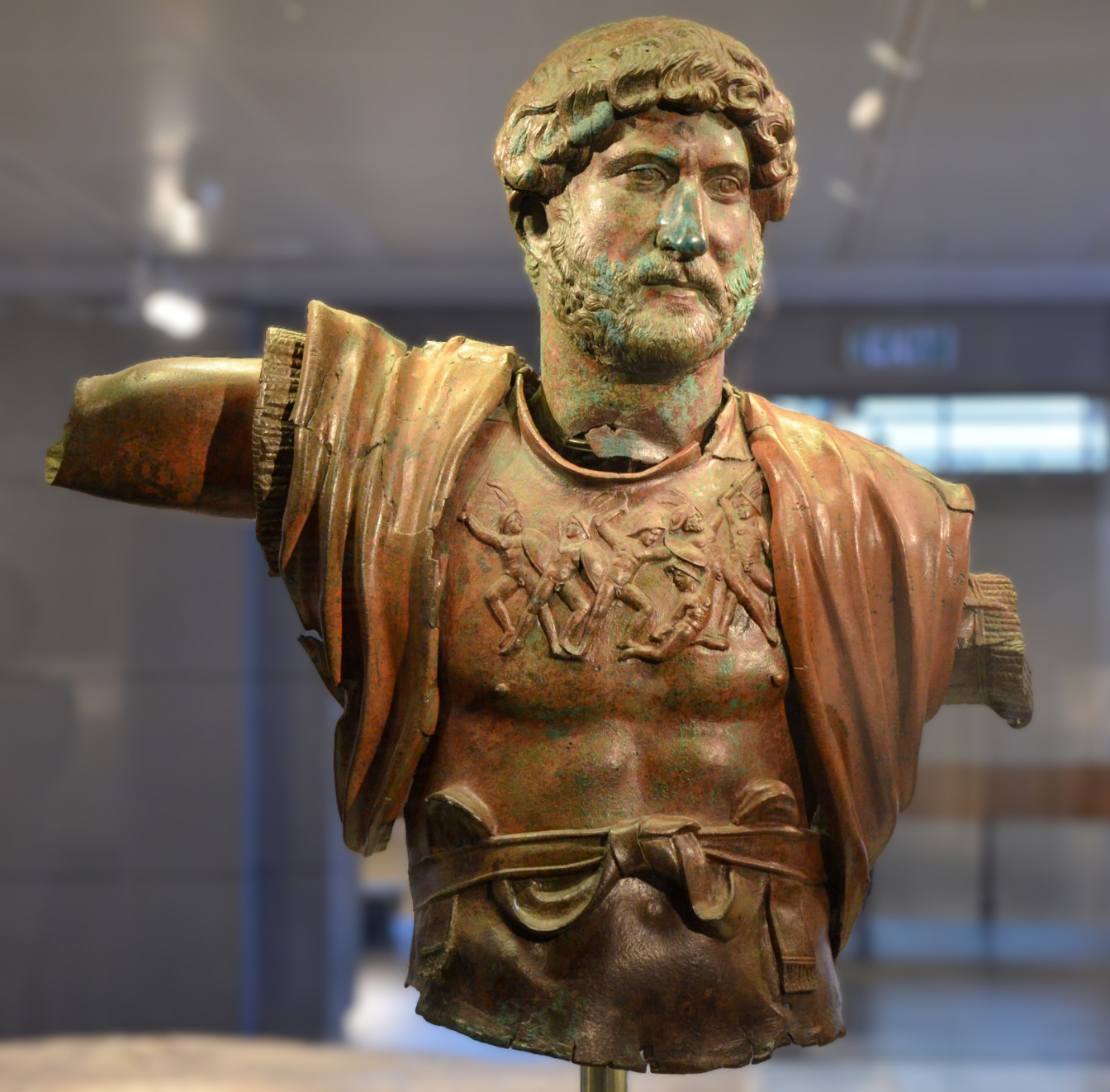
Statue of Hadrian unearthed at Tel Shalem commemorating Roman military victory over Simon bar Kokhba, displayed at the Israel Museum, Jerusalem

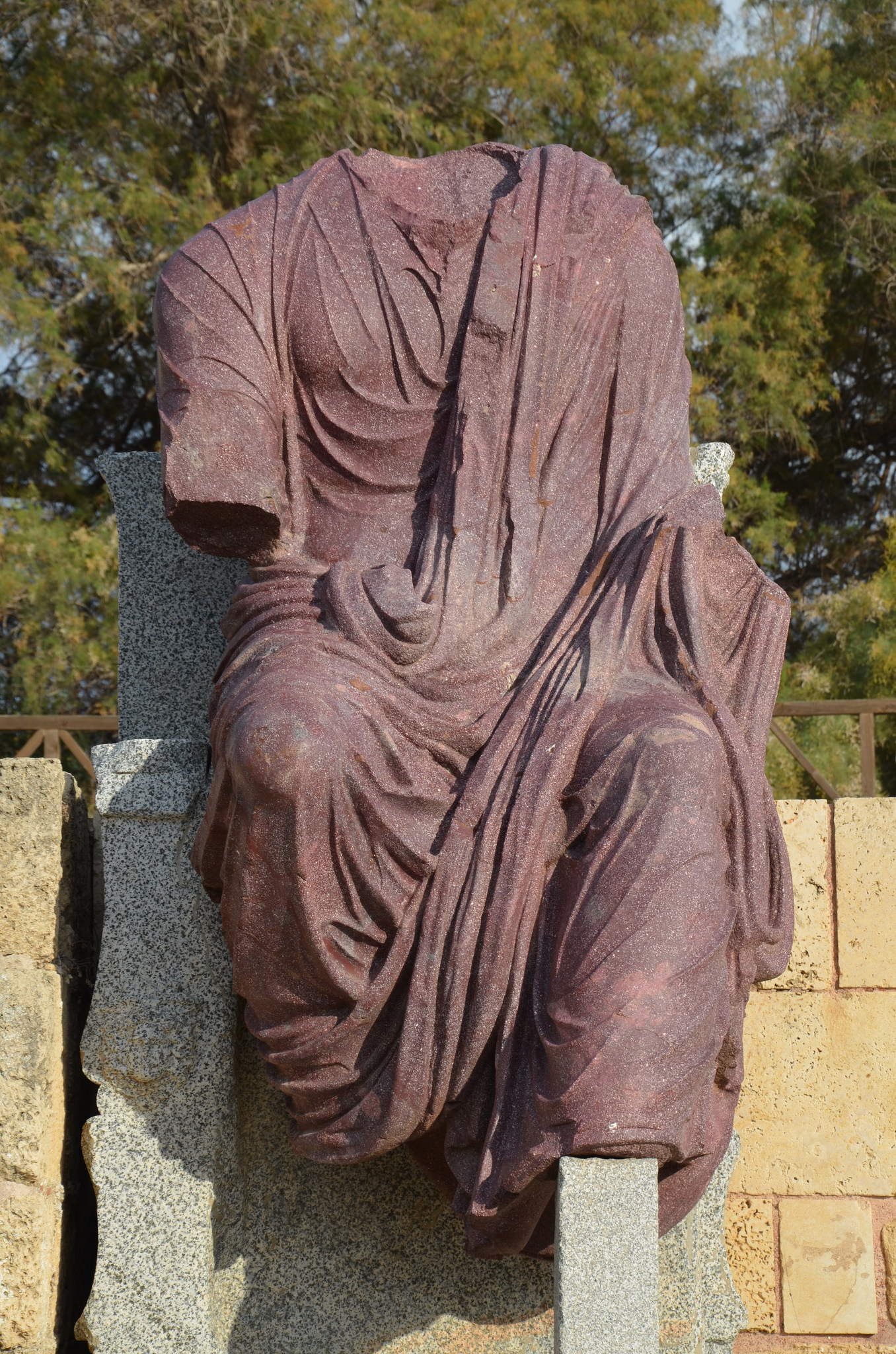
Porphyry statue of Hadrian discovered in Caesarea, Israel

==== Background, causes ====
In Roman Judaea, Hadrian visited Jerusalem, which was still in ruins after the First Jewish–Roman War of 66–73. He may have planned to rebuild Jerusalem as a colonia as Vespasian had done with Caesarea Maritima – with various honorific and fiscal privileges. The non-Roman population had no obligation to participate in Roman religious rituals but was expected to support the Roman imperial order; this is attested in Caesarea, where some Jews served in the Roman army during both the 66 and 132 rebellions. It has been speculated that Hadrian intended to assimilate the Temple in Jerusalem to the traditional civic-religious Roman imperial cult; such assimilations had long been commonplace practice in Greece and in other provinces, and on the whole, had been successful.

The Samaritans had already integrated their religious rites with Hellenistic ones. Strict Jewish monotheism proved more resistant to imperial cajoling, and then to imperial demands.

A tradition based on the Historia Augusta suggests that the revolt was spurred by Hadrian's abolition of circumcision (brit milah); which he, as a Hellenist, viewed as mutilation. The scholar Peter Schäfer maintains that there is no evidence for this claim, given the notoriously problematical nature of the Historia Augusta as a source, the "tomfoolery" shown by the writer in the relevant passage, and the fact that contemporary Roman legislation on "genital mutilation" seems to address the general issue of castration of slaves by their masters. Other issues could have contributed to the outbreak: a heavy-handed, culturally insensitive Roman administration; tensions between the landless poor and incoming Roman colonists privileged with land-grants; and a strong undercurrent of messianism, predicated on Jeremiah's prophecy that the Temple would be rebuilt seventy years after its destruction, as the First Temple had been after the Babylonian exile.

==== Revolt ====
A massive anti-Hellenistic and anti-Roman Jewish uprising broke out, led by Simon bar Kokhba. Given the fragmentary nature of the existing evidence, it is impossible to ascertain an exact date for the beginning of the uprising. It probably began between summer and fall of 132.

The Roman governor Tineius (Tynius) Rufus asked for an army to crush the resistance; bar Kokhba punished any Jew who refused to join his ranks. According to Justin Martyr and Eusebius, that had to do mostly with Christian converts, who opposed bar Kokhba's messianic claims.

The Romans were overwhelmed by the organised ferocity of the uprising. Hadrian called his general Sextus Julius Severus from Britain and brought troops in from as far as the Danube. Roman losses were heavy; an entire legion or its numeric equivalent of around 4,000. Hadrian's report on the war to the Roman Senate omitted the customary salutation, "If you and your children are in health, it is well; I and the legions are in health."

The rebellion was quashed by 135. According to Cassius Dio. Beitar, a fortified city 10 kilometres (6.2 mi) southwest of Jerusalem, fell after a three-and-a-half-year siege.

==== Aftermath; persecutions ====
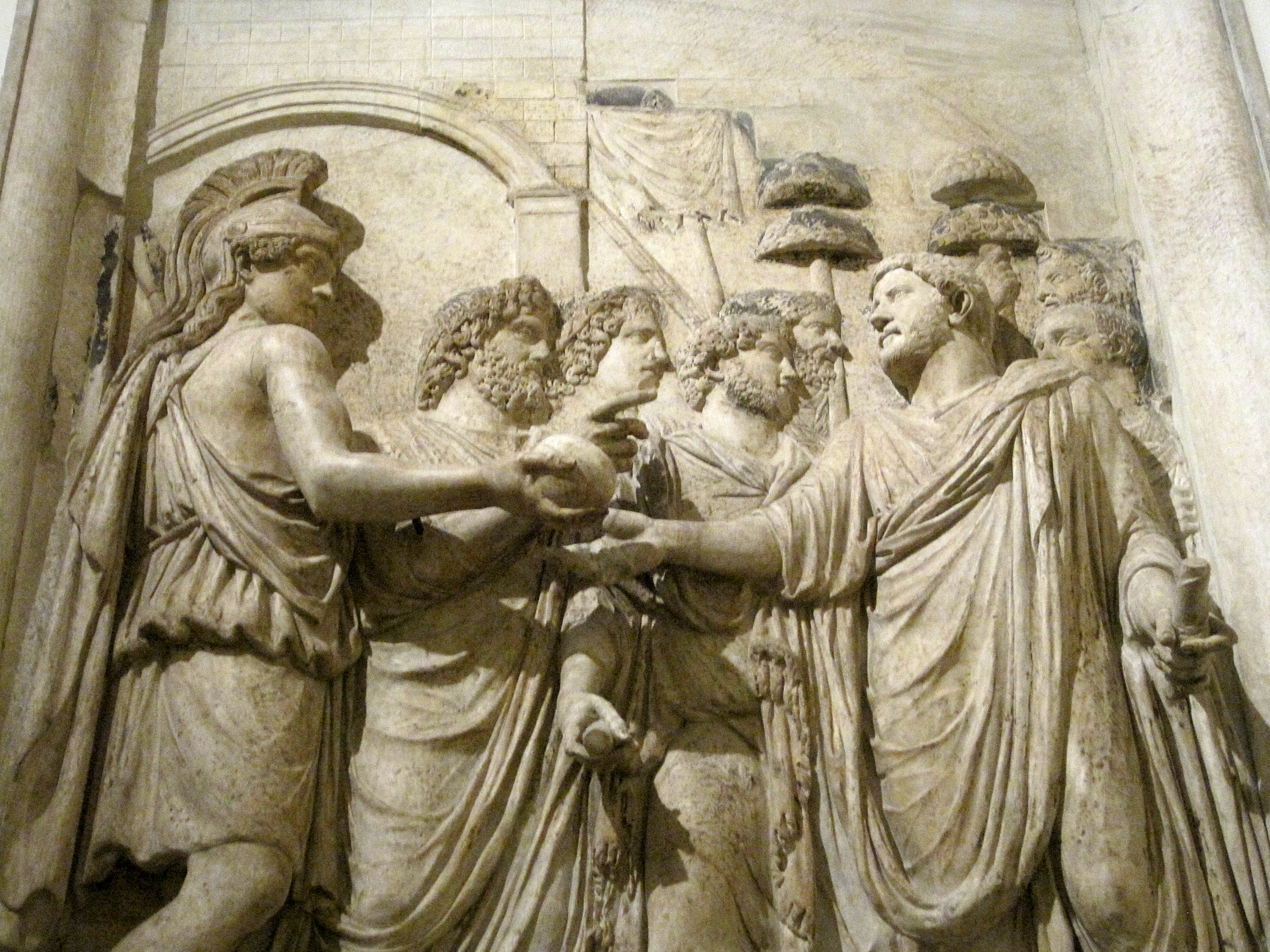
Relief from an honorary monument of Hadrian (detail), showing the emperor being greeted by the goddess Roma and the Genii of the Senate and the Roman People; marble, Roman artwork, 2nd century AD, Capitoline Museums, Vatican City

Roman war operations in Judea left some 580,000 Jews dead, with 50 fortified towns and 985 villages razed.

An unknown proportion of the population was enslaved. The extent of punitive measures against the Jewish population remains a matter of debate.

Hadrian renamed Judea province Syria Palaestina. He renamed Jerusalem Aelia Capitolina after himself and Jupiter Capitolinus and had the city rebuilt in Greek style. According to Epiphanius, Hadrian appointed Aquila from Sinope in Pontus as "overseer of the work of building the city", since he was related to him by marriage. Hadrian is said to have placed the city's main Forum at the junction of the main Cardo and Decumanus Maximus, now the location for the (smaller) Muristan. After the suppression of the Jewish revolt, Hadrian provided the Samaritans with a temple dedicated to Zeus Hypsistos ("Highest Zeus") on Mount Gerizim. The bloody repression of the revolt ended Jewish political independence from the Roman imperial order.

==== Hadrian's itinerary ====
Inscriptions make it clear that in 133, Hadrian took to the field with his armies against the rebels. He then returned to Rome, probably in that year and almost certainly – judging from inscriptions – via Illyricum.

== Final years ==
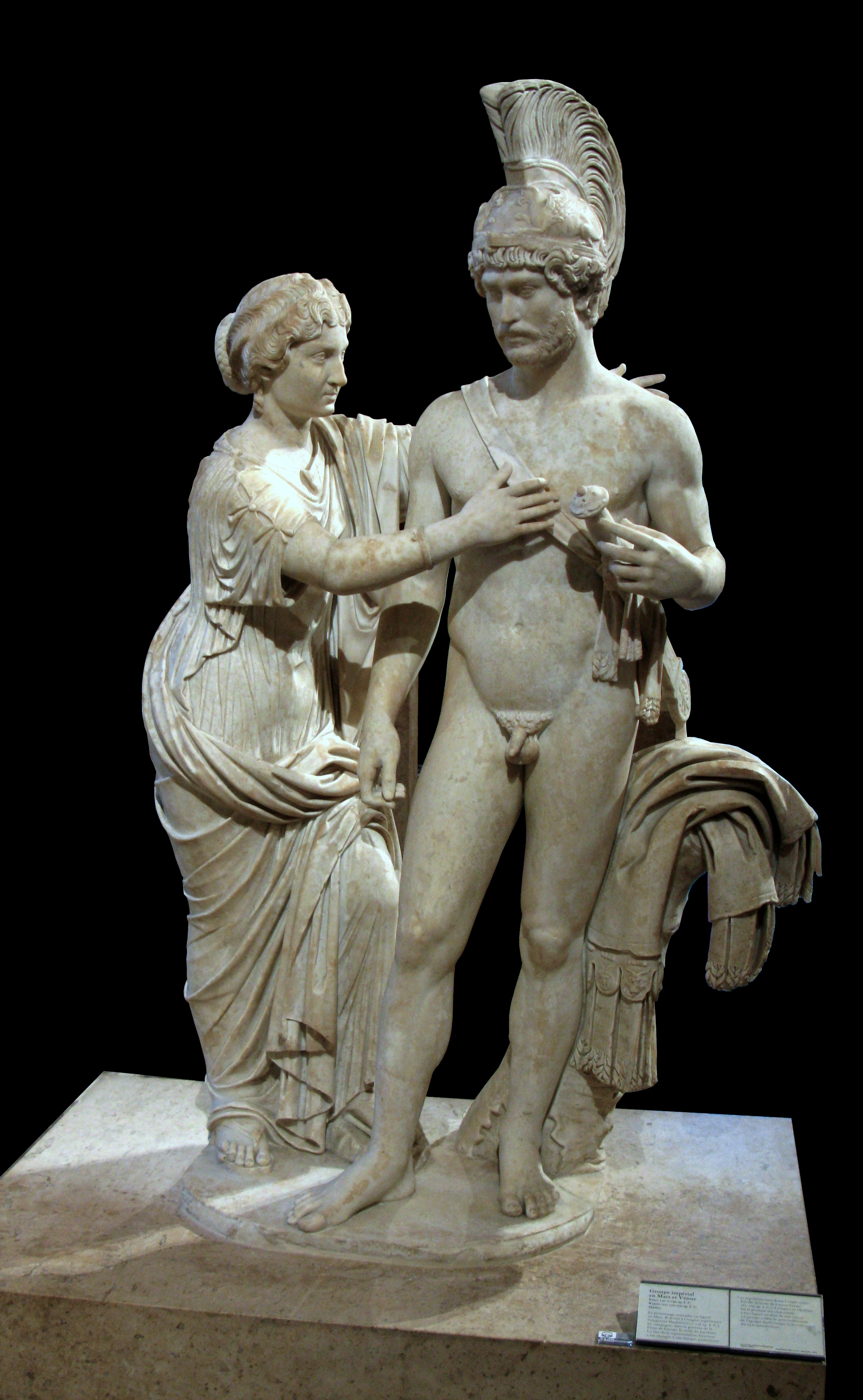
imperial group as Mars and Venus; the male figure is a portrait of Hadrian, the female figure was perhaps reworked into a portrait of Annia Lucilla; marble, Roman artwork, c. 120–140 AD, reworked c. 170–175 AD

Hadrian spent the final years of his life in Rome. In 134, he took an imperial salutation for the end of the Third Jewish War (which was not actually concluded until the following year). Commemorations and achievement awards were kept to a minimum, as Hadrian came to see the war "as a cruel and sudden disappointment to his aspirations" towards a cosmopolitan empire.

Empress Sabina died, probably in 136, after an unhappy marriage with which Hadrian had coped as a political necessity. The Historia Augusta biography states that Hadrian himself declared that his wife's "ill-temper and irritability" would be reason enough for a divorce, were he a private citizen. That gave credence, after Sabina's death, to the common belief that Hadrian had her poisoned. In keeping with well-established imperial propriety, Sabina – who had been made an Augusta sometime around 128 – was deified not long after her death.

=== Arranging the succession ===
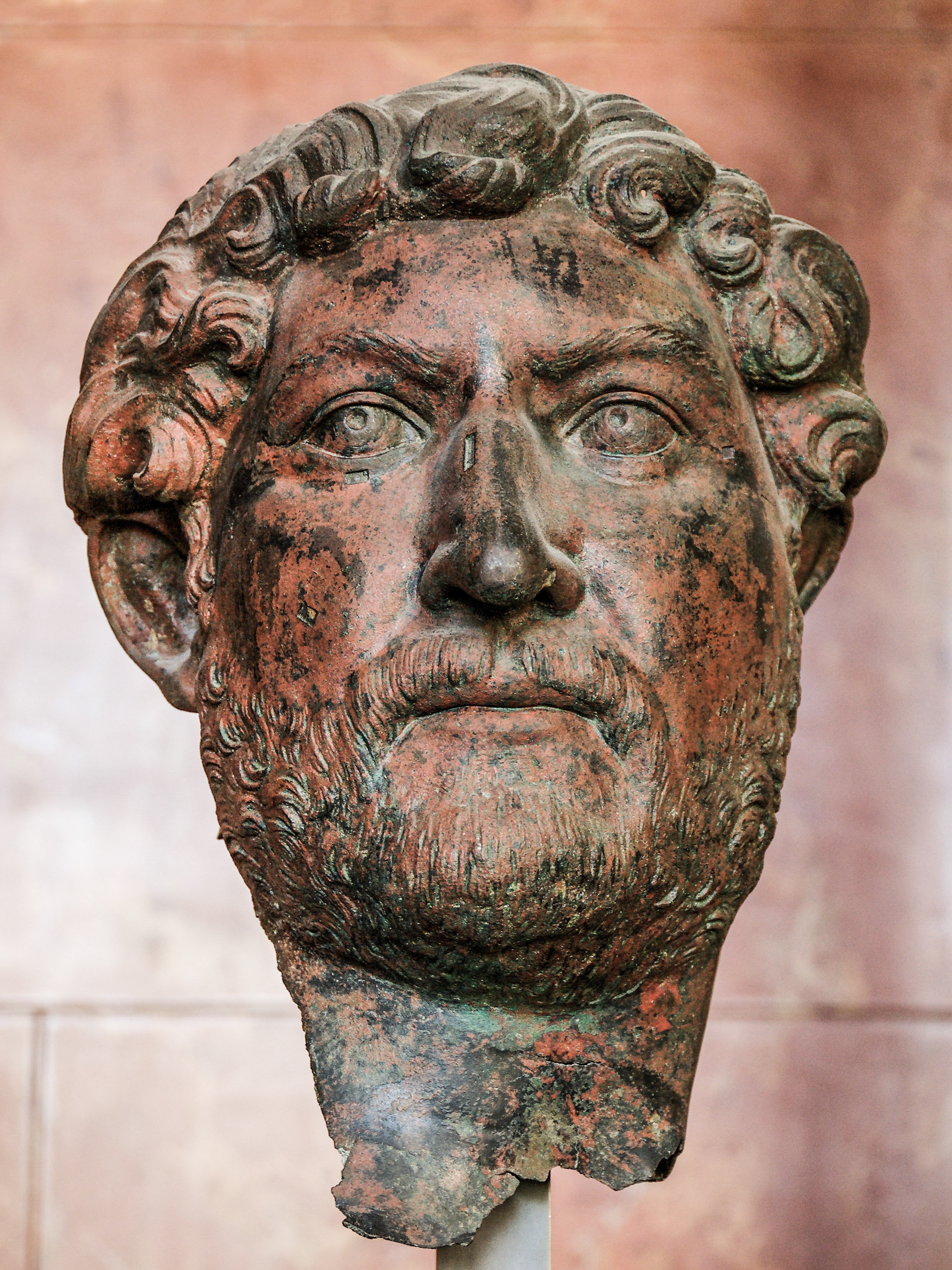
Posthumous portrait of Hadrian; bronze, Roman artwork, c. 140 AD, perhaps from Roman Egypt, Louvre, Paris

Hadrian's marriage to Sabina had been childless. Suffering from poor health, Hadrian turned to the issue of succession. In 136, he adopted one of the ordinary consuls of that year, Lucius Ceionius Commodus, who, as an emperor-in-waiting, took the name Lucius Aelius Caesar. He was the son-in-law of Gaius Avidius Nigrinus, one of the "four consulars" executed in 118. His health was delicate, and his reputation apparently more that "of a voluptuous, well-educated great lord than that of a leader". Various modern attempts have been made to explain Hadrian's choice: Jerome Carcopino proposes that Aelius was Hadrian's natural son. It has also been speculated that his adoption was Hadrian's belated attempt to reconcile with one of the most important of the four senatorial families whose leading members had been executed soon after Hadrian's succession. Aelius acquitted himself honourably as joint governor of Pannonia Superior and Pannonia Inferior; he held a further consulship in 137 but died on 1 January 138.

Hadrian next adopted Titus Aurelius Fulvus Boionius Arrius Antoninus (the future emperor Antoninus Pius), who had served Hadrian as one of the five imperial legates of Italy, and as proconsul of Asia. In the interests of dynastic stability, Hadrian required that Antoninus adopt both Lucius Ceionius Commodus (son of the deceased Aelius Caesar) and Marcus Annius Verus (grandson of an influential senator of the same name who had been Hadrian's close friend); Annius was already betrothed to Aelius Caesar's daughter Ceionia Fabia. It may not have been Hadrian, but rather Antoninus Pius – Annius Verus's uncle – who supported Annius Verus' advancement; the latter's divorce of Ceionia Fabia and subsequent marriage to Antoninus' daughter Annia Faustina points in the same direction. When he eventually became Emperor, Marcus Aurelius would co-opt Ceionius Commodus as his co-Emperor, under the name of Lucius Verus, on his own initiative.

Hadrian's last few years were marked by conflict and unhappiness. His adoption of Aelius Caesar proved unpopular, not least with Hadrian's brother-in-law Lucius Julius Ursus Servianus and Servianus's grandson Gnaeus Pedanius Fuscus Salinator. Servianus, though now far too old, had stood in the line of succession at the beginning of Hadrian's reign; Fuscus is said to have had designs on the imperial power for himself. In 137, he may have attempted a coup in which his grandfather was implicated; Hadrian ordered that both be put to death. Servianus is reported to have prayed before his execution that Hadrian would "long for death but be unable to die". During his final, protracted illness, Hadrian was prevented from suicide on several occasions.

=== Death ===
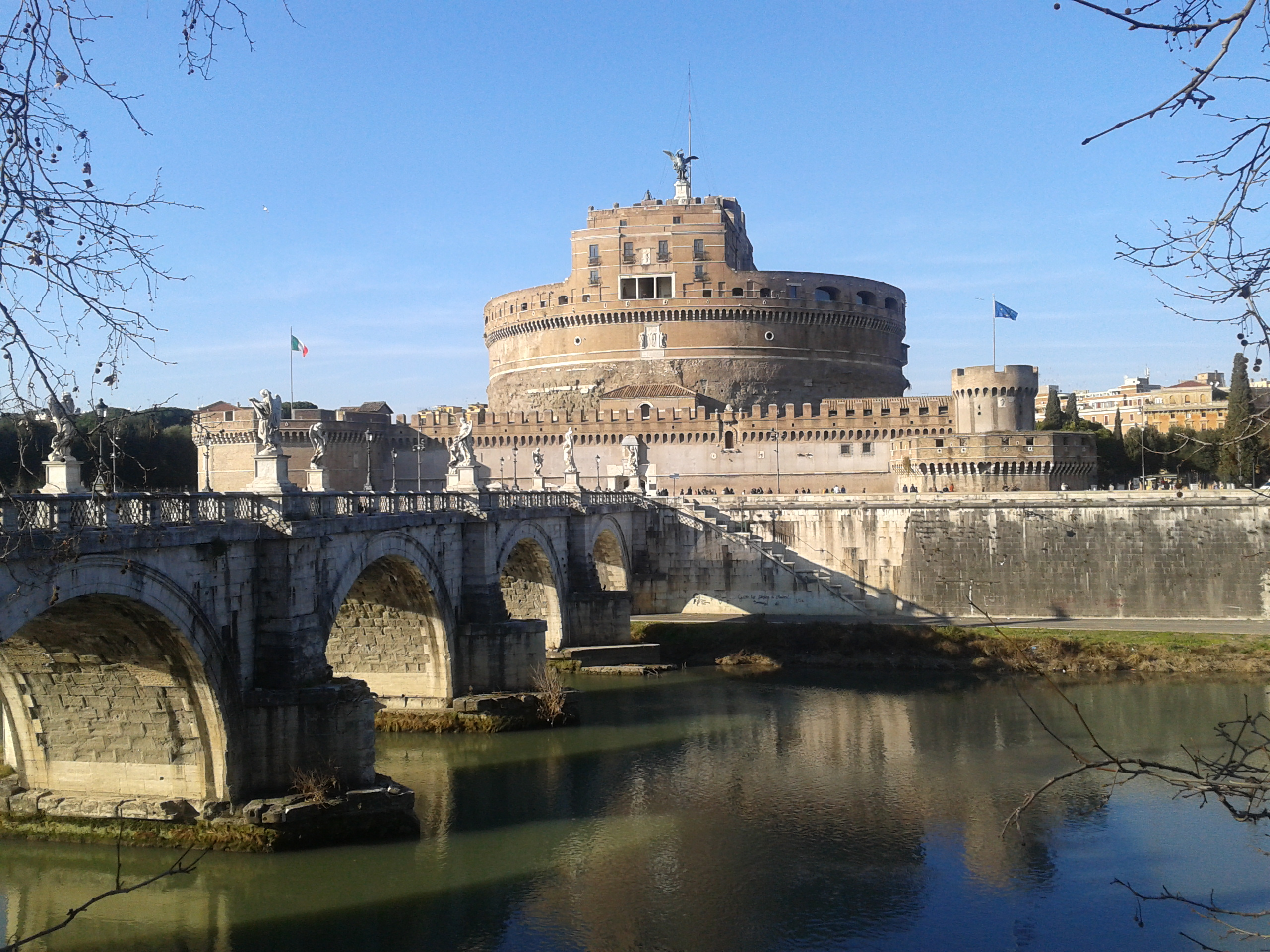
The Castel Sant'Angelo by the River Tiber in Rome, commissioned by Hadrian as a mausoleum for himself and his family

Hadrian died in the year 138 on 10 July, in his villa at Baiae at the age of 62, having reigned for 21 years. Dio Cassius and the Historia Augusta record details of his failing health; some modern sources interpret the ear-creases on later portrayals (such as the Townley Hadrian) as signs of coronary artery disease.

He was buried at Puteoli, near Baiae, on an estate that had once belonged to Cicero. Soon after, his remains were transferred to Rome and buried in the Gardens of Domitia, close to the almost-complete mausoleum. Upon completion of the Mausoleum of Hadrian in Rome in 139 by his successor Antoninus Pius, his body was cremated. His ashes were placed there together with those of his wife Vibia Sabina and his first adopted son, Lucius Aelius Caesar, who also died in 138. The Senate had been reluctant to grant Hadrian divine honours; but Antoninus persuaded them by threatening to refuse the position of Emperor. Hadrian was given a temple on the Campus Martius, ornamented with reliefs representing the provinces. The Senate awarded Antoninus the title of "Pius", in recognition of his filial piety in pressing for the deification of Hadrian, his adoptive father. At the same time, perhaps in reflection of the senate's ill will towards Hadrian, commemorative coinage honouring his deification was kept to a minimum.

== Military activities ==
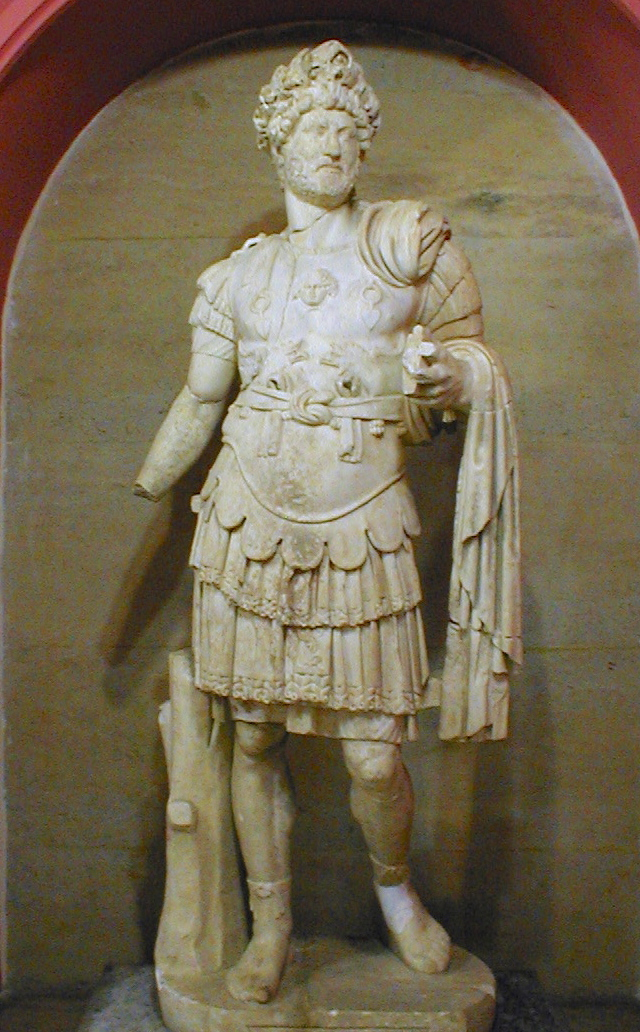
Statue of Hadrian in military garb, wearing the civic crown and muscle cuirass, from Antalya, Turkey

Most of Hadrian's military activities were consistent with his ideology of empire as a community of mutual interest and support. He focused on protection from external and internal threats; on "raising" existing provinces rather than the aggressive acquisition of wealth and territory through subjugation of "foreign" peoples that had characterised the early empire. Hadrian's policy shift was part of a trend towards the slowing down of the empire's expansion, such expansion being not closed after him, but a significant step in that direction, given the empire's overstretching. While the empire as a whole benefited from this, military careerists resented the loss of opportunities.

The 4th-century historian Aurelius Victor saw Hadrian's withdrawal from Trajan's territorial gains in Mesopotamia as a jealous belittlement of Trajan's achievements (Traiani gloriae invidens). More likely, an expansionist policy was no longer sustainable; the empire had lost two legions, the Legio XXII Deiotariana and the "lost legion" IX Hispania, possibly destroyed in a late Trajanic uprising by the Brigantes in Britain. Trajan himself may have thought his gains in Mesopotamia indefensible and abandoned them shortly before his death. Hadrian granted parts of Dacia to the Roxolani Sarmatians; their king, Rasparaganus, received Roman citizenship, client king status, and possibly an increased subsidy. Hadrian's presence on the Dacian front is mere conjecture, but Dacia was included in his coin series with allegories of the provinces. A controlled partial withdrawal of troops from the Dacian plains would have been less costly than maintaining several Roman cavalry units and a supporting network of fortifications.

Hadrian retained control over Osroene through the client king Parthamaspates, who had once served as Trajan's client king of Parthia; and around 123, Hadrian negotiated a peace treaty with the now-independent Parthia (according to the Historia Augusta, disputed). Late in his reign (135), the Alani attacked Roman Cappadocia with the covert support of Pharasmanes, the king of Caucasian Iberia. The attack was repulsed by Hadrian's governor, the historian Arrian, who subsequently installed a Roman "adviser" in Iberia. Arrian kept Hadrian well-informed on matters related to the Black Sea and the Caucasus. Between 131 and 132, he sent Hadrian a lengthy letter (Periplus of the Euxine) on a maritime trip around the Black Sea that was intended to offer relevant information in case a Roman intervention was needed.

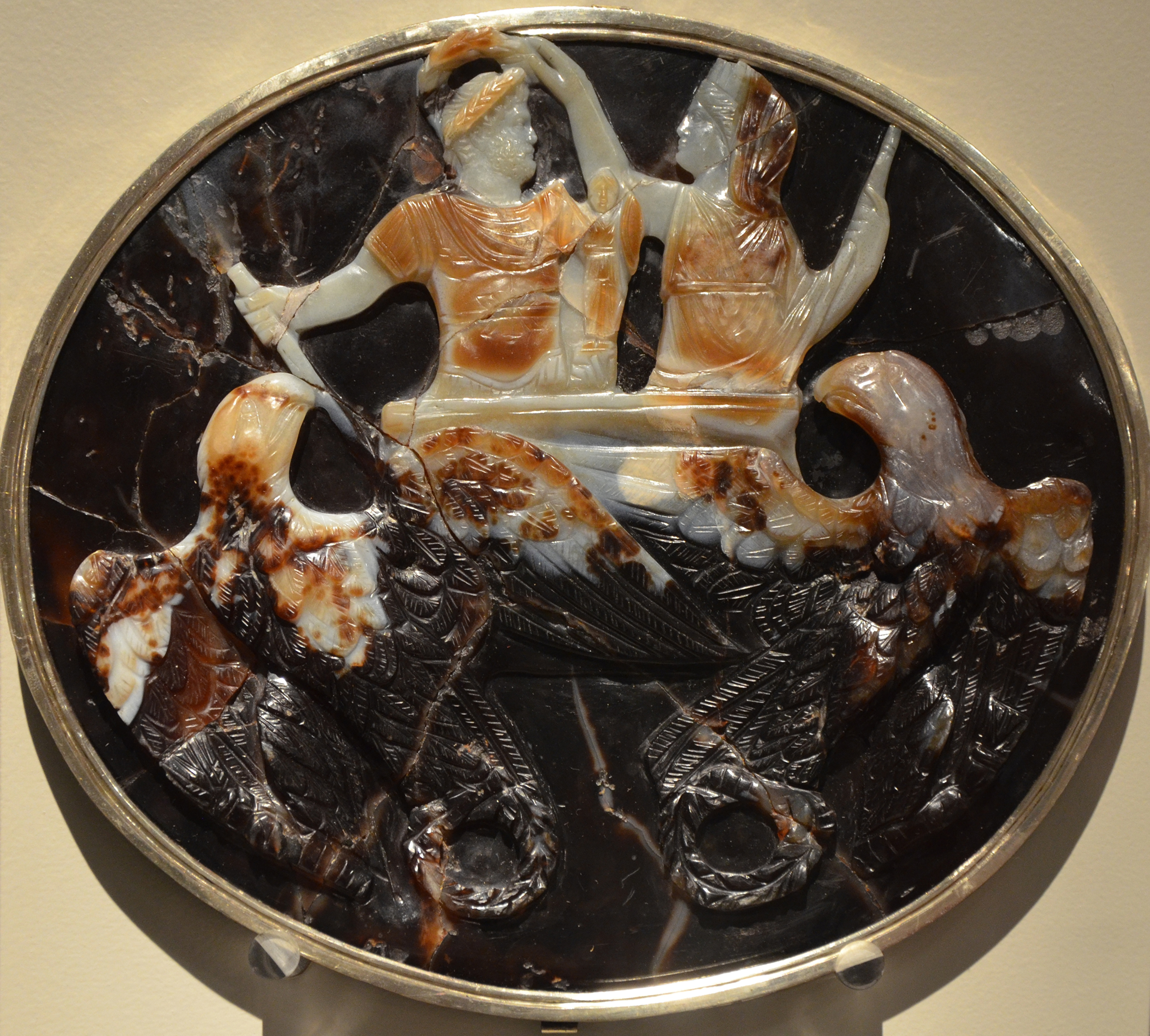
Sardonyx cameo depicting Hadrian being crowned by Roma in a chariot pulled by eagles as ruler of the world. Possibly made for Claudius around 50 CE with the head being reworked into a portrait of Hadrian, Altes Museum

Hadrian also developed permanent fortifications and military posts along the empire's borders (limites, sl. limes) to support his policy of stability, peace and preparedness. That helped keep the military usefully occupied in times of peace; his wall across Britannia was built by ordinary troops. A series of mostly wooden fortifications, forts, outposts and watchtowers strengthened the Danube and Rhine borders. Troops practised intensive, regular drill routines. Although his coins showed military images almost as often as peaceful ones, Hadrian's policy was peace through strength, even threat, with an emphasis on disciplina (discipline), which was the subject of two monetary series. Cassius Dio praised Hadrian's emphasis on "spit and polish" as cause for the generally peaceful character of his reign. Fronto, by contrast, claimed that Hadrian preferred war games to actual war and enjoyed "giving eloquent speeches to the armies" – like the inscribed series of addresses he made while on an inspection tour, during 128, at the new headquarters of Legio III Augusta in Lambaesis.

Faced with a shortage of legionary recruits from Italy and other Romanised provinces, Hadrian systematised the use of less costly numeri – ethnic non-citizen troops with special weapons, such as Eastern mounted archers, in low-intensity, mobile defensive tasks such as dealing with border infiltrators and skirmishers. Hadrian is also credited with introducing units of heavy cavalry (cataphracts) into the Roman army. Fronto later blamed Hadrian for declining standards in the Roman army of his own time.

== Legal and social reforms ==
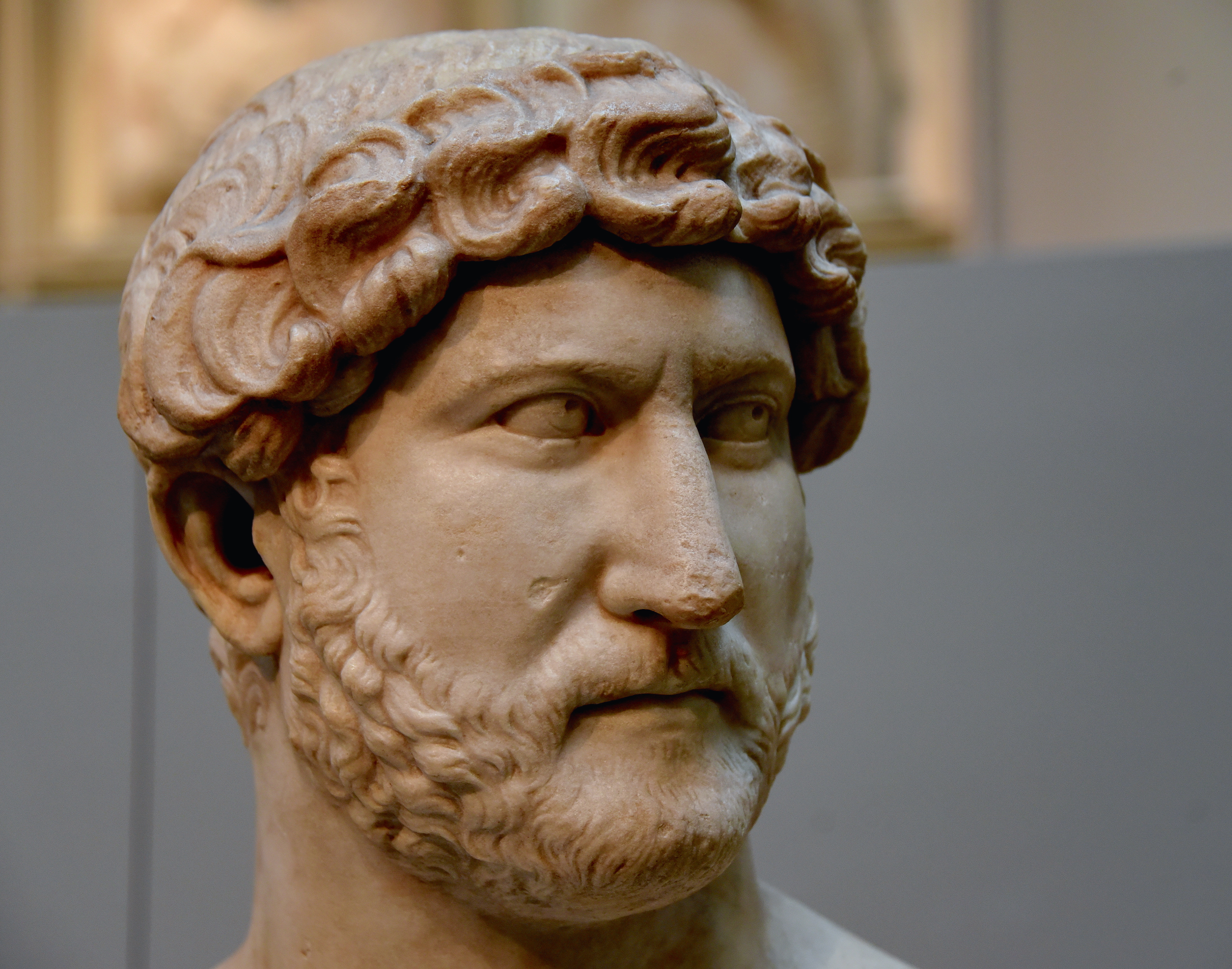
Bust of Emperor Hadrian, Roman, 117–138 CE. Probably from Rome, Italy. Formerly in the Townley Collection, now housed in the British Museum, London

Hadrian enacted, through the jurist Salvius Julianus, the first attempt to codify Roman law. This was the Perpetual Edict, according to which the legal actions of praetors became fixed statutes and, as such, could no longer be subjected to personal interpretation or change by any magistrate other than the Emperor. At the same time, following a procedure initiated by Domitian, Hadrian made the Emperor's legal advisory board, the consilia principis ("council of the princeps") into a permanent body, staffed by salaried legal aides. Its members were mostly drawn from the equestrian class, replacing the earlier freedmen of the imperial household. This innovation marked the superseding of surviving Republican institutions by an openly autocratic political system. The reformed bureaucracy was supposed to exercise administrative functions independently of traditional magistracies; objectively it did not detract from the Senate's position. The new civil servants were free men and as such supposed to act on behalf of the interests of the "Crown", not of the Emperor as an individual. However, the Senate never accepted the loss of its prestige caused by the emergence of a new aristocracy alongside it, placing more strain on the already troubled relationship between the Senate and the Emperor.

Hadrian codified the customary legal privileges of the wealthiest, most influential, highest-status citizens (described as splendidiores personae or honestiores), who held a traditional right to pay fines when found guilty of relatively minor, non-treasonous offences. Low-ranking persons – alii ("the others"), including low-ranking citizens – were humiliores who for the same offences could be subject to extreme physical punishments, including forced labour in the mines or in public works, as a form of fixed-term servitude. While Republican citizenship had carried at least notional equality under law, and the right to justice, offences in imperial courts were judged and punished according to the relative prestige, rank, reputation and moral worth of both parties; senatorial courts were apt to be lenient when trying one of their peers, and to deal very harshly with offences committed against one of their number by low-ranking citizens or non-citizens. For treason (maiestas), beheading was the worst punishment that the law could inflict on honestiores; the humiliores might suffer crucifixion, burning, or condemnation to the beasts in the arena.

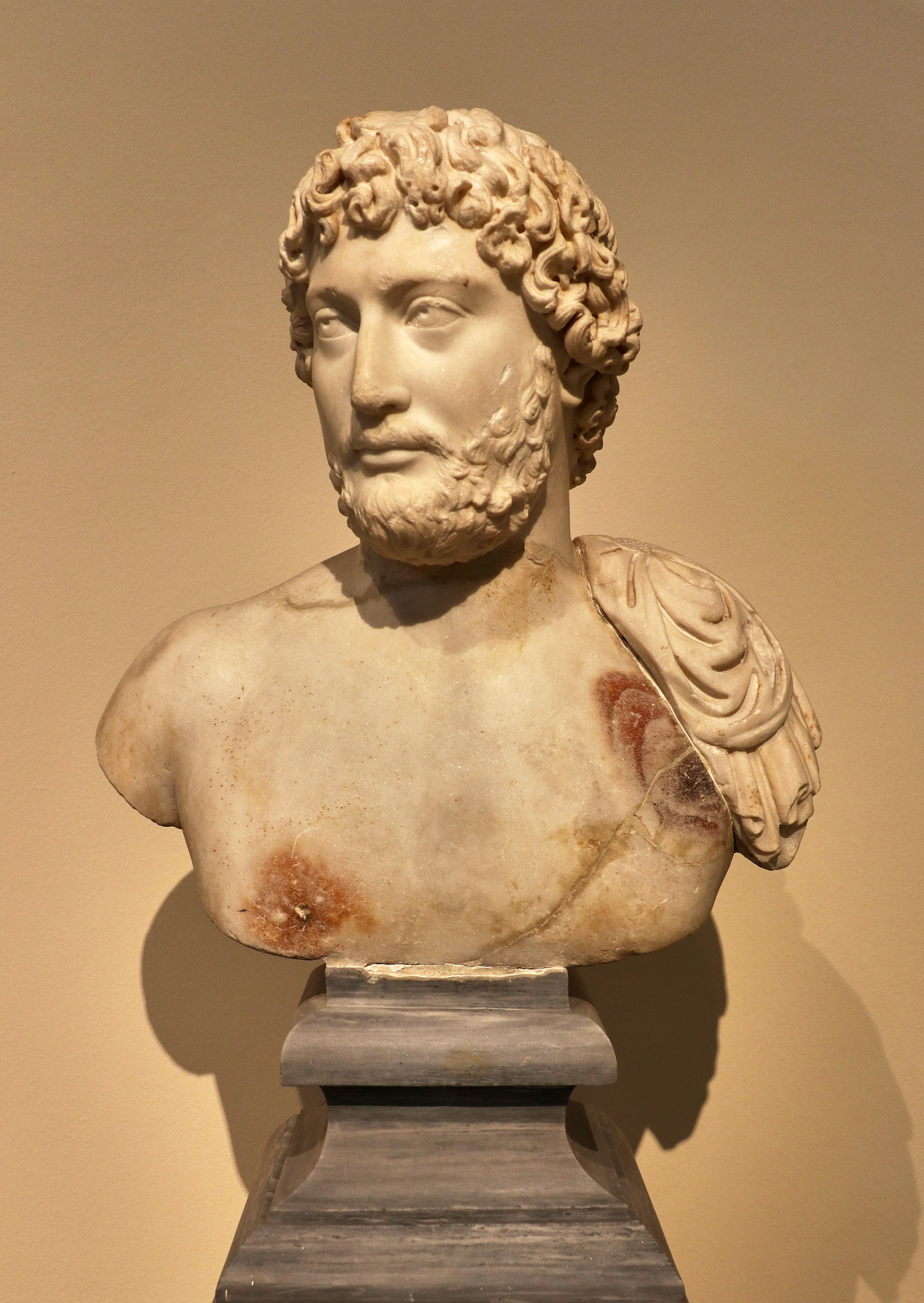
Bust of Hadrian from Athens, c. 130 AD, National Archaeological Museum, Athens

A great number of Roman citizens maintained a precarious social and economic advantage at the lower end of the hierarchy. Hadrian found it necessary to clarify that decurions, the usually middle-class, elected local officials responsible for running the ordinary, everyday official business of the provinces, counted as honestiores; so did soldiers, veterans and their families, as far as civil law was concerned; by implication, almost all citizens below those ranks – the vast majority of the Empire's population – counted as humiliores, with low citizen status, high tax obligations and limited rights. Like most Romans, Hadrian seems to have accepted slavery as morally correct, an expression of the same natural order that rewarded "the best men" with wealth, power and respect. When confronted by a crowd demanding the freeing of a popular slave charioteer, Hadrian replied that he could not free a slave belonging to another person. However, he limited the punishments that slaves could suffer; they could be lawfully tortured to provide evidence, but they could not be lawfully killed unless guilty of a capital offence. Masters were forbidden to sell slaves to a gladiator trainer (lanista) or to a procurer, except as legally justified punishment. Hadrian also forbade torture of free defendants and witnesses. He abolished ergastula, private prisons for slaves in which kidnapped free men had sometimes been illegally detained.

Hadrian issued a general rescript, imposing a ban on castration, performed on freedman or slave, voluntarily or not, on pain of death for both the performer and the patient. Under the Lex Cornelia de sicariis et veneficis, castration was placed on a par with conspiracy to murder and punished accordingly. Notwithstanding his philhellenism, Hadrian was also a traditionalist. He enforced dress-standards among the honestiores; senators and knights were expected to wear the toga when in public. He imposed strict separation between the sexes in theatres and public baths; to discourage idleness, the latter were not allowed to open until 2:00 in the afternoon, "except for medical reasons."

== Religious activities ==
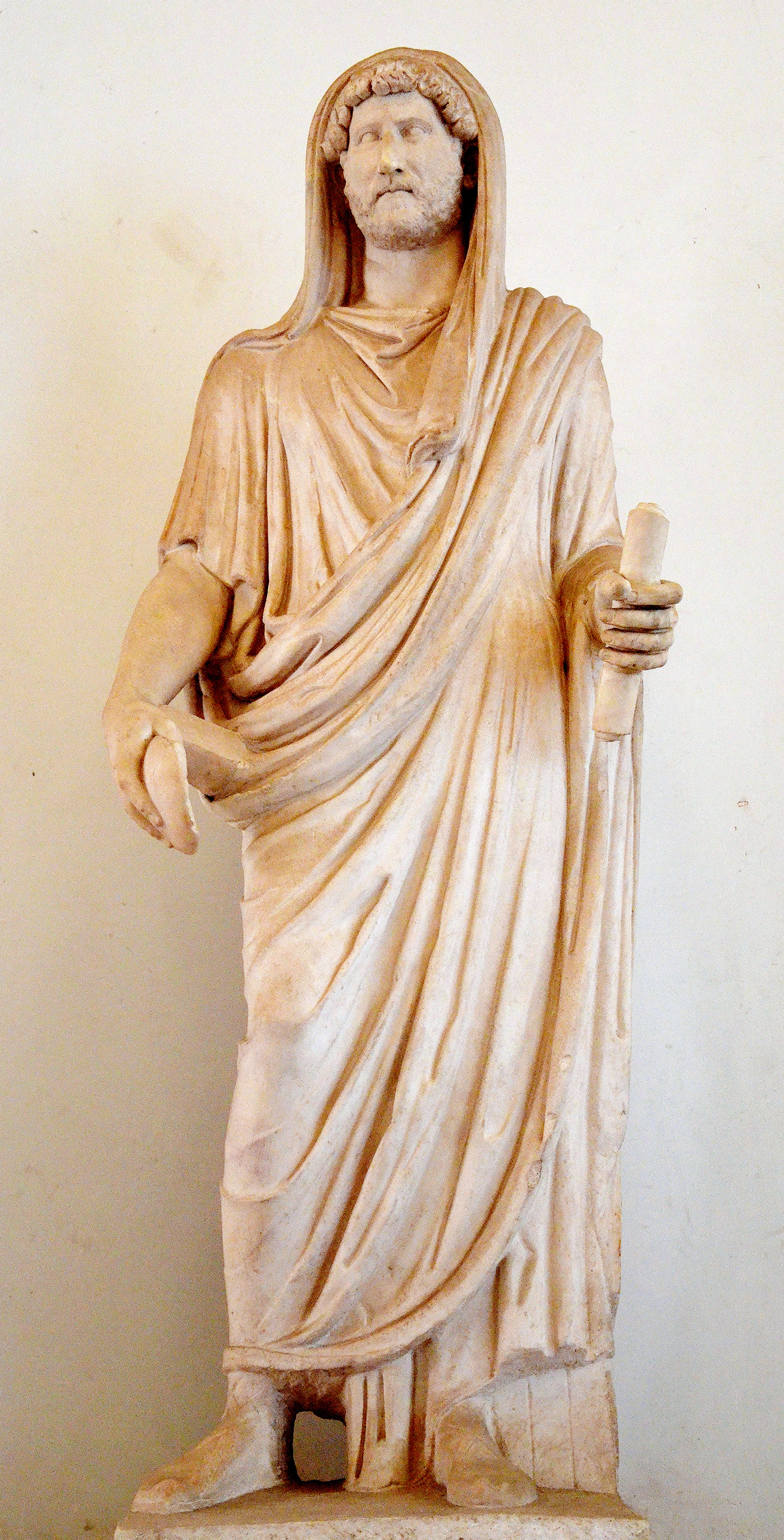
Statue of Hadrian as pontifex maximus, dated 130–140 AD, from Rome, Palazzo Nuovo, Capitoline Museums

One of Hadrian's immediate duties on accession was to seek senatorial consent for the deification of his predecessor, Trajan, and any members of Trajan's family to whom he owed a debt of gratitude. Matidia Augusta, Hadrian's mother-in-law, died in December 119 and was duly deified. Hadrian may have stopped at Nemausus during his return from Britannia to oversee the completion or foundation of a basilica dedicated to his patroness Plotina. She had recently died in Rome and had been deified at Hadrian's request.

As Emperor, Hadrian was also Rome's pontifex maximus, responsible for all religious affairs and the proper functioning of official religious institutions throughout the empire. His Hispano-Roman origins and marked pro-Hellenism shifted the focus of the official imperial cult from Rome to the Provinces. While his standard coin issues identified him with the traditional genius populi Romani, other issues stressed his personal identification with Hercules Gaditanus (Hercules of Gades), and Rome's imperial protection of Greek civilisation. He promoted Sagalassos in Greek Pisidia as the Empire's leading imperial cult centre; his exclusively Greek Panhellenion extolled Athens as the spiritual centre of Greek culture.

Hadrian added several imperial cult centres to the existing roster, particularly in Greece, where traditional intercity rivalries were commonplace. Cities promoted as imperial cult centres drew imperial sponsorship of festivals and sacred games, and attracted tourism, trade and private investment. Local worthies and sponsors were encouraged to seek self-publicity as cult officials under the aegis of Roman rule and to foster reverence for imperial authority. Hadrian's rebuilding of long-established religious centres would have further underlined his respect for the glories of classical Greece – something well in line with contemporary antiquarian tastes. During Hadrian's third and last trip to the Greek East, there seems to have been an upwelling of religious fervour, focused on Hadrian himself. He was given personal cult as a deity, monuments and civic homage, according to the religious syncretism of the time. He may have had the great Serapeum of Alexandria rebuilt, following damage sustained in 116, during the Diaspora revolt.

In 136, just two years before his death, Hadrian dedicated his Temple of Venus and Roma. It was built on land he had set aside for the purpose in 121, formerly the site of Nero's Golden House. The temple was the largest in Rome and was built in a Hellenising style, more Greek than Roman. Its dedication and statuary associated the cultus of the traditional Roman goddess Venus, divine ancestress and protector of the Roman people, with the cultus of the goddess Roma – herself a Greek invention, hitherto worshipped only in the provinces – to emphasise the universal nature of the empire.

=== Antinous ===
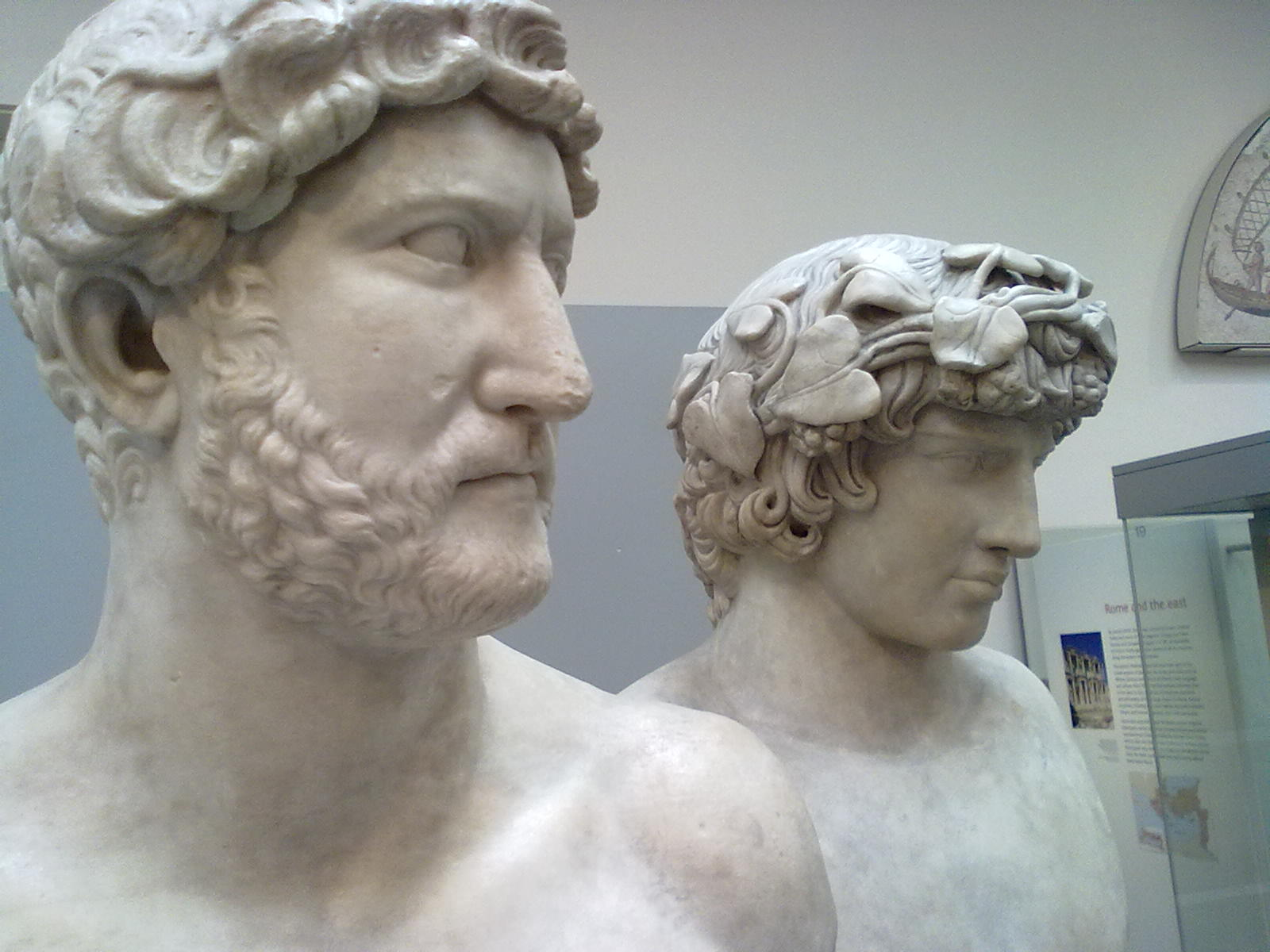
Busts of Hadrian and Antinous in the British Museum

Hadrian had Antinous deified as Osiris-Antinous by an Egyptian priest at the ancient Temple of Ramesses II, very near the place of his death. Hadrian dedicated a new temple-city complex there, built in a Graeco-Roman style, and named it Antinoöpolis. It was a proper Greek polis; it was granted an imperially subsidised alimentary scheme similar to Trajan's alimenta, and its citizens were allowed intermarriage with members of the native population without loss of citizen status. Hadrian thus identified an existing native cult (to Osiris) with Roman rule. The cult of Antinous was to become very popular in the Greek-speaking world and also found support in the West. In Hadrian's villa, statues of the Tyrannicides, with a bearded Aristogeiton and a clean-shaven Harmodios, linked his favourite to the classical tradition of Greek love. In the west, Antinous was identified with the Celtic sun god Belenos.

Hadrian was criticised for the open intensity of his grief at Antinous's death, particularly as he had delayed the apotheosis of his own sister Paulina after her death. Nevertheless, his recreation of the deceased youth as a cult figure found little opposition. Though not a subject of the state-sponsored, official Roman imperial cult, Antinous offered a common focus for the emperor and his subjects, emphasising their sense of community. Medals were struck with his effigy, and statues were erected to him in all parts of the empire, in all kinds of garb, including Egyptian dress. Temples were built for his worship in Bithynia and Mantineia in Arcadia. In Athens, festivals were celebrated in his honour and oracles delivered in his name. As an "international" cult figure, Antinous had enduring fame, far outlasting Hadrian's reign. Local coins with his effigy were still being struck during Caracalla's reign, and he was invoked in a poem to celebrate the accession of Diocletian.

=== Christians ===
Hadrian continued Trajan's policy on Christians; they should not be sought out and should only be prosecuted for specific offences, such as refusal to swear oaths. In a rescript addressed to the proconsul of Asia, Gaius Minicius Fundanus, and preserved by Justin Martyr, Hadrian laid down that accusers of Christians had to bear the burden of proof for their denunciations or be punished for calumnia (defamation).

== Personal and cultural interests ==
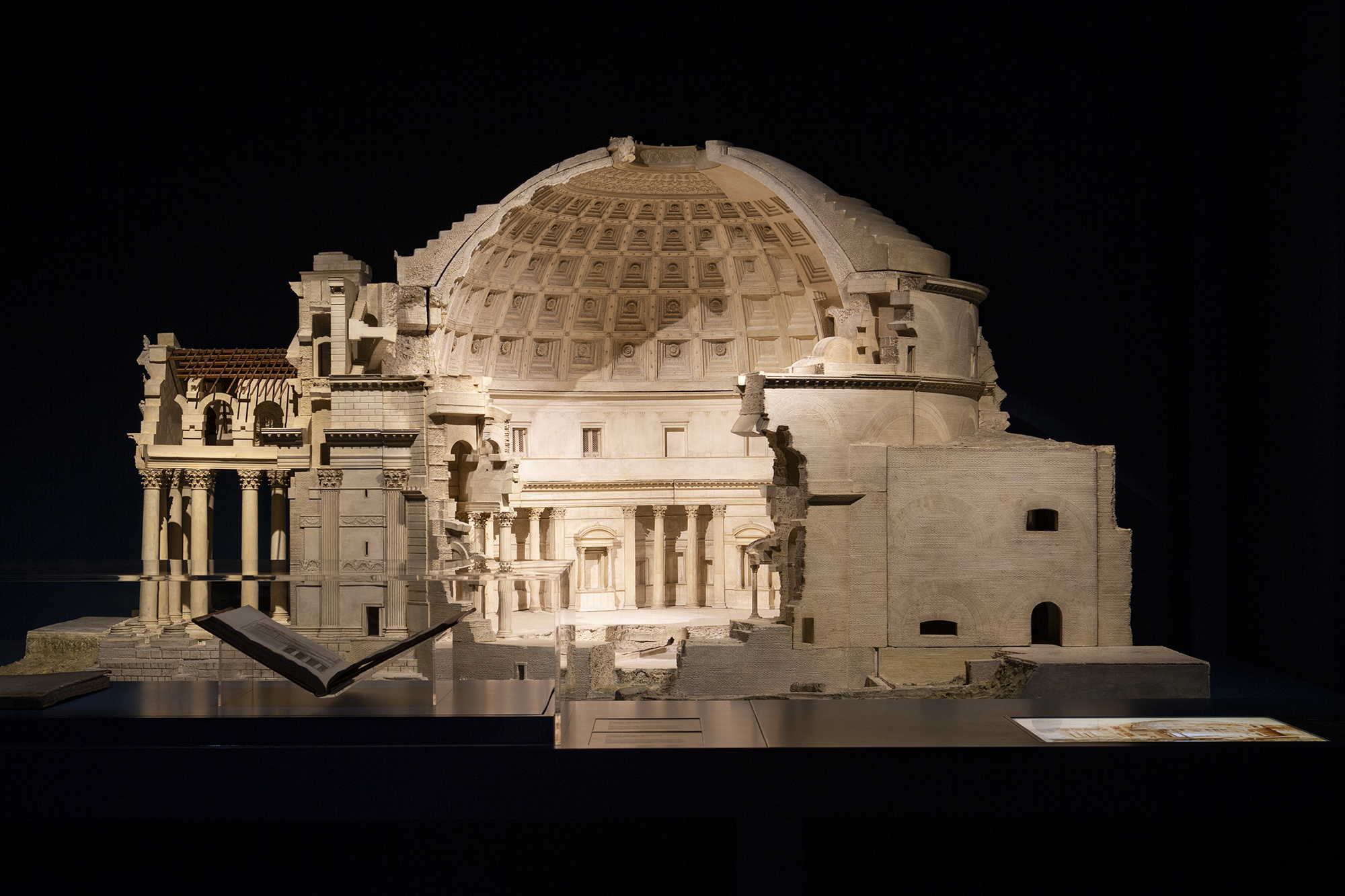
Sectional architectural model of the Pantheon

Hadrian had an abiding and enthusiastic interest in art, architecture and public works. As part of his imperial restoration program, he founded, re-founded or rebuilt many towns and cities throughout the Empire, supplying them with temples, stadiums and other public buildings. Examples in the Roman Province of Thrace include monumental developments to the Stadium and Odeon of Philippopolis (present-day Plovdiv), the provincial capital, and his rebuilding and enlargement of the city of Orestias, which he renamed Hadrianopolis (modern Edirne). Several other towns and cities – including Roman Carthage – were named or renamed Hadrianopolis. Rome's Pantheon (temple "to all the gods"), originally built by Agrippa and destroyed by fire in 80, was partly restored under Trajan and completed under Hadrian in its familiar domed form. Hadrian's Villa at Tibur (Tivoli) provides the greatest Roman equivalent of an Alexandrian garden, complete with domed Serapeum, recreating a sacred landscape.

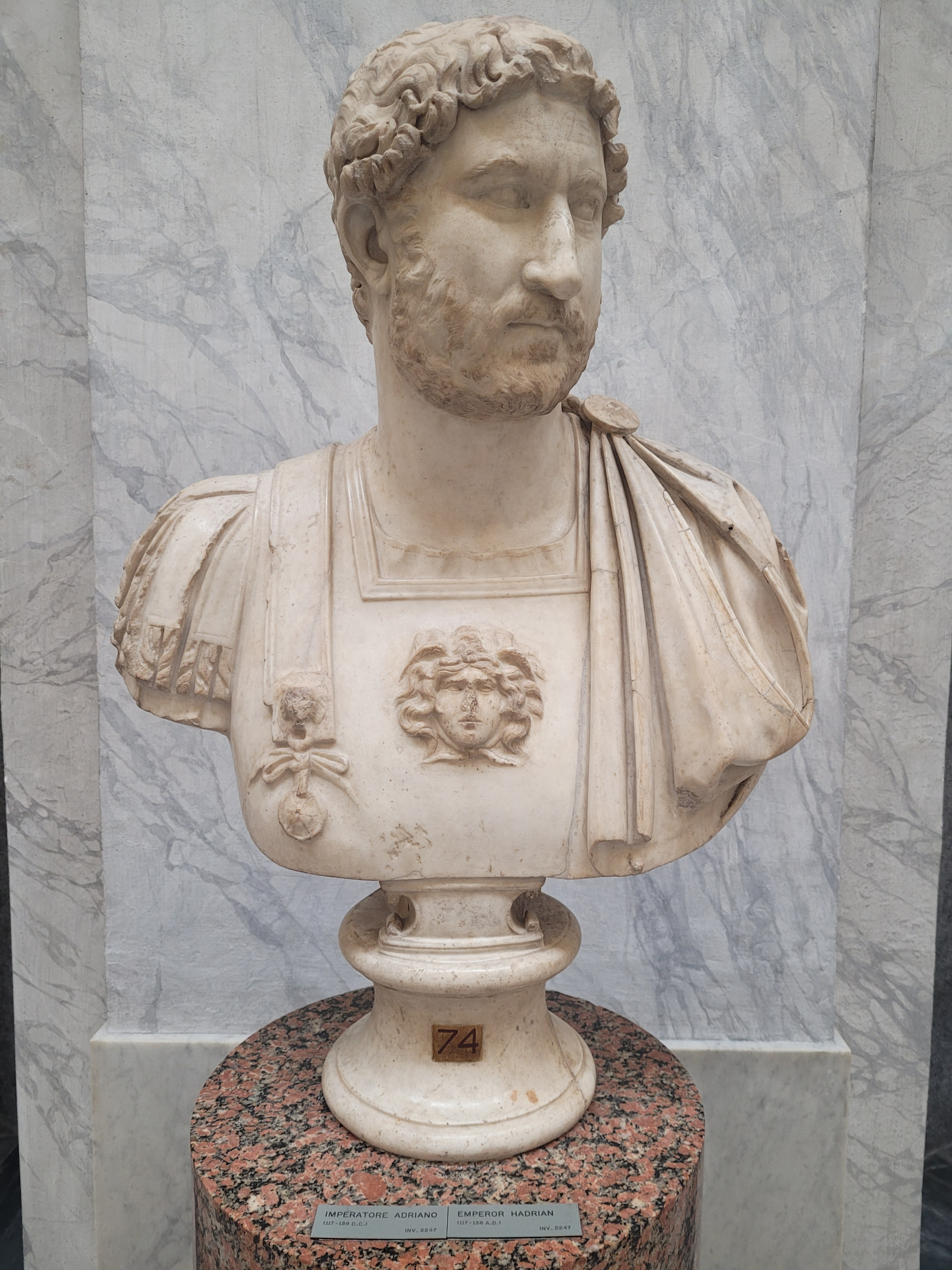
Bust of Hadrian at the Vatican Museums

An anecdote from Cassius Dio's history suggests Hadrian had a high opinion of his own architectural tastes and talents and took their rejection as a personal offence: at some time before his reign, his predecessor Trajan was discussing an architectural problem with Apollodorus of Damascus – architect and designer of Trajan's Forum, the Column commemorating his Dacian conquest, and his bridge across the Danube – when Hadrian interrupted to offer his advice. Apollodorus gave him a scathing response: "Be off, and draw your gourds [a sarcastic reference to the domes which Hadrian apparently liked to draw]. You don't understand any of these matters." Dio claims that once Hadrian became emperor, he showed Apollodorus drawings of the gigantic Temple of Venus and Roma, implying that great buildings could be created without his help. When Apollodorus pointed out the building's various insoluble problems and faults, Hadrian was enraged, sent him into exile and later put him to death on trumped-up charges.

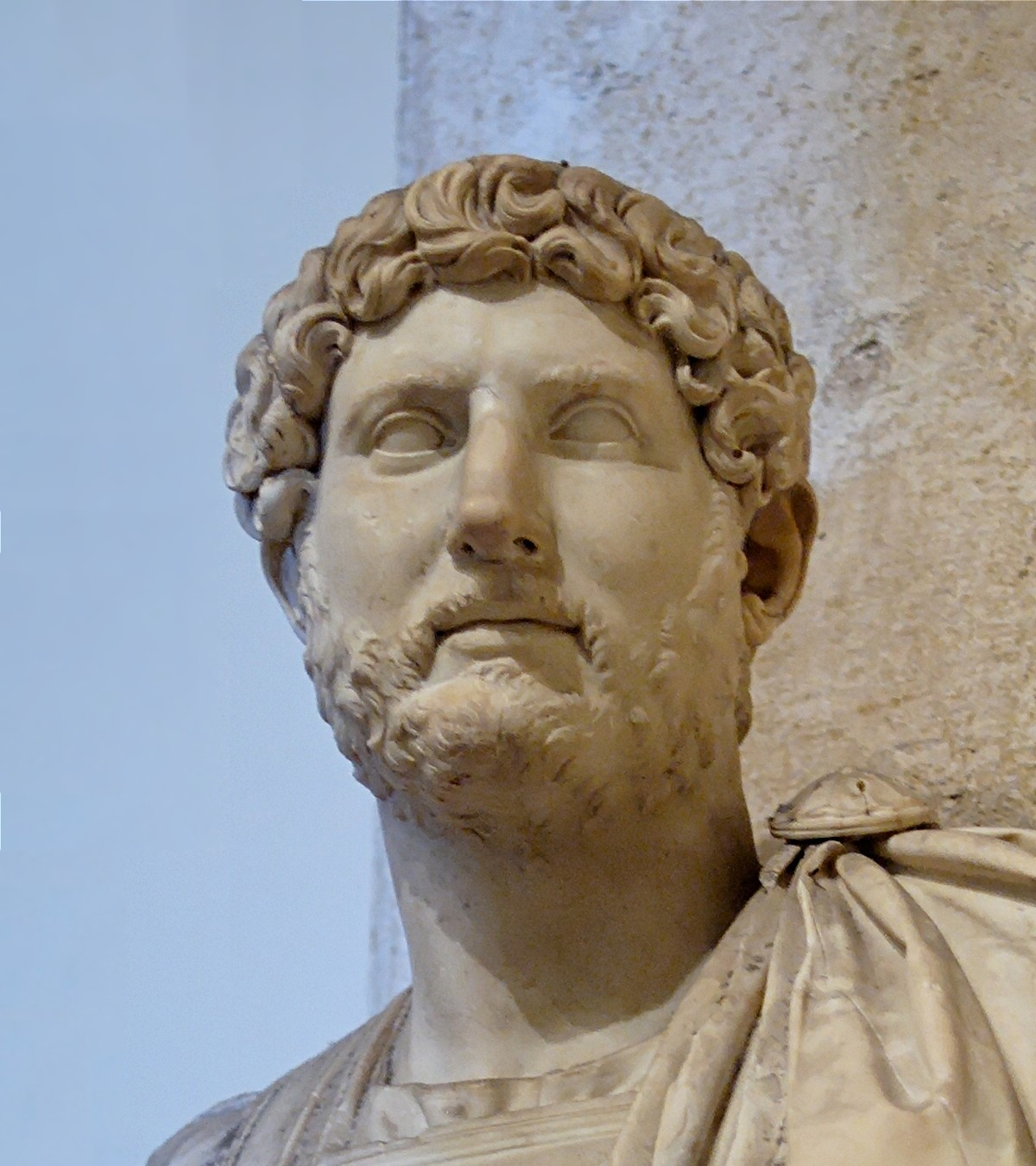
Bust of the emperor Hadrian in the Capitoline Museums

Hadrian was a passionate hunter from a young age. In northwest Asia, he founded and dedicated a city to commemorate a she-bear he killed. In Egypt he and his beloved Antinous killed a lion. In Rome, eight reliefs featuring Hadrian in different stages of hunting decorate a building that began as a monument celebrating a kill.

Hadrian's philhellenism may have been one reason for his adoption, like Nero before him, of the beard as suited to Roman imperial dignity; Dio of Prusa had equated the growth of the beard with the Hellenic ethos. Hadrian's beard may also have served to conceal his natural facial blemishes. Before Hadrian, all emperors except Nero (who occasionally wore sideburns) had been clean-shaven, according to the fashion introduced among the Romans by Scipio Africanus (236–183 BCE). After Hadrian until the reign of Constantine the Great (r. 306–337) all adult emperors were bearded. The wearing of the beard as an imperial fashion was subsequently revived by Phocas (r. 602–610) at the beginning of the 7th century and this fashion lasted until the end of the Byzantine Empire.

Hadrian was familiar with the rival philosophers Epictetus and Favorinus, and with their works, and held an interest in Roman philosophy. During his first stay in Greece, before he became emperor, he attended lectures by Epictetus at Nicopolis. Shortly before the death of Plotina, Hadrian had granted her wish that the leadership of the Epicurean School in Athens be open to a non-Roman candidate.

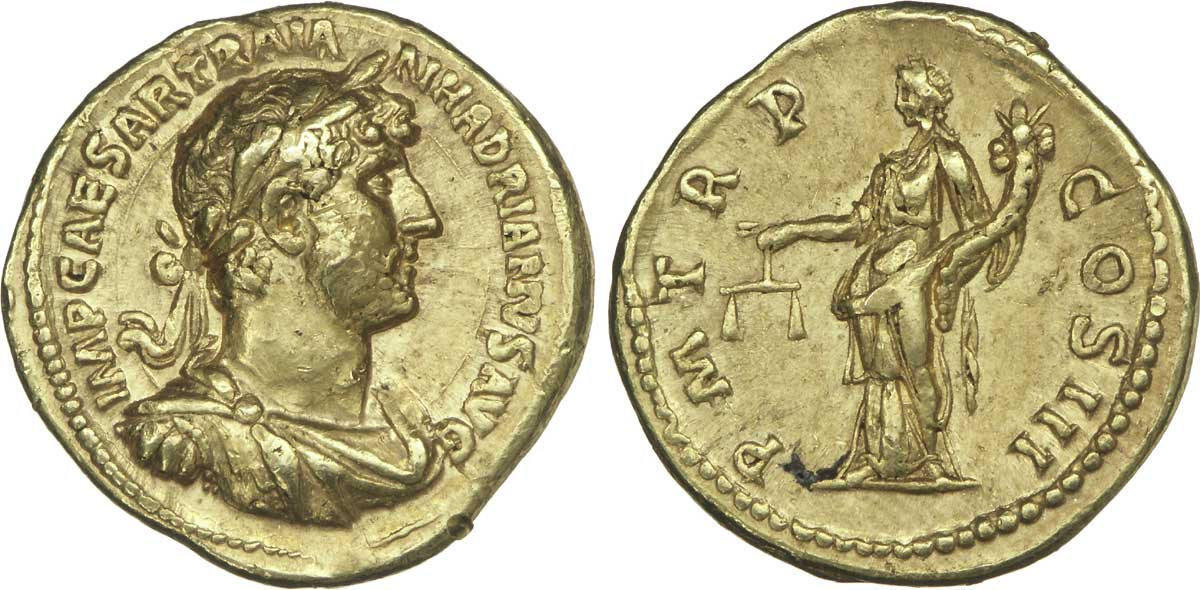
An aureus of Hadrian minted in 123 AD. The reverse bears a personification of Aequitas Augusti or Juno Moneta. The legends read as: IMP. CAESAR TRAIA-N. HADRIANVS AVG. / P. M., TR. P., CO[N]S. III

During Hadrian's time as tribune of the plebs, omens and portents supposedly announced his future imperial condition. According to the Historia Augusta, Hadrian had a great interest in astrology and divination and had been told of his future accession to the Empire by a granduncle who was himself a skilled astrologer.

Hadrian wrote poetry in both Latin and Greek; one of the few surviving examples is a Latin poem he reportedly composed on his deathbed (see below). Some of his Greek productions found their way into the Palatine Anthology. He also wrote an autobiography, which Historia Augusta says was published under the name of Hadrian's freedman Phlegon of Tralles. It was not a work of great length or revelation but designed to scotch various rumours or explain Hadrian's most controversial actions. It is possible that this autobiography had the form of a series of open letters to Antoninus Pius.

=== Poem by Hadrian ===
According to the Historia Augusta, Hadrian composed the following poem shortly before his death:

Animula vagula blandula
Hospes comesque corporis
Quae nunc abibis in loca
Pallidula, rigida, nudula,
Nec, ut soles, dabis iocos...

P. Aelius Hadrianus Imp.

Roving amiable little soul,
Body's companion and guest,
Now descending for parts
Colourless, unbending, and bare
Your usual distractions no more shall be there...

Publius Aelius Hadrian Imperator

The poem has enjoyed remarkable popularity, but uneven critical acclaim. According to Aelius Spartianus, the alleged author of Hadrian's biography in the Historia Augusta, Hadrian "wrote also similar poems in Greek, not much better than this one". T. S. Eliot's poem "Animula" may have been inspired by Hadrian's, though the relationship is not unambiguous.

== Appraisals ==
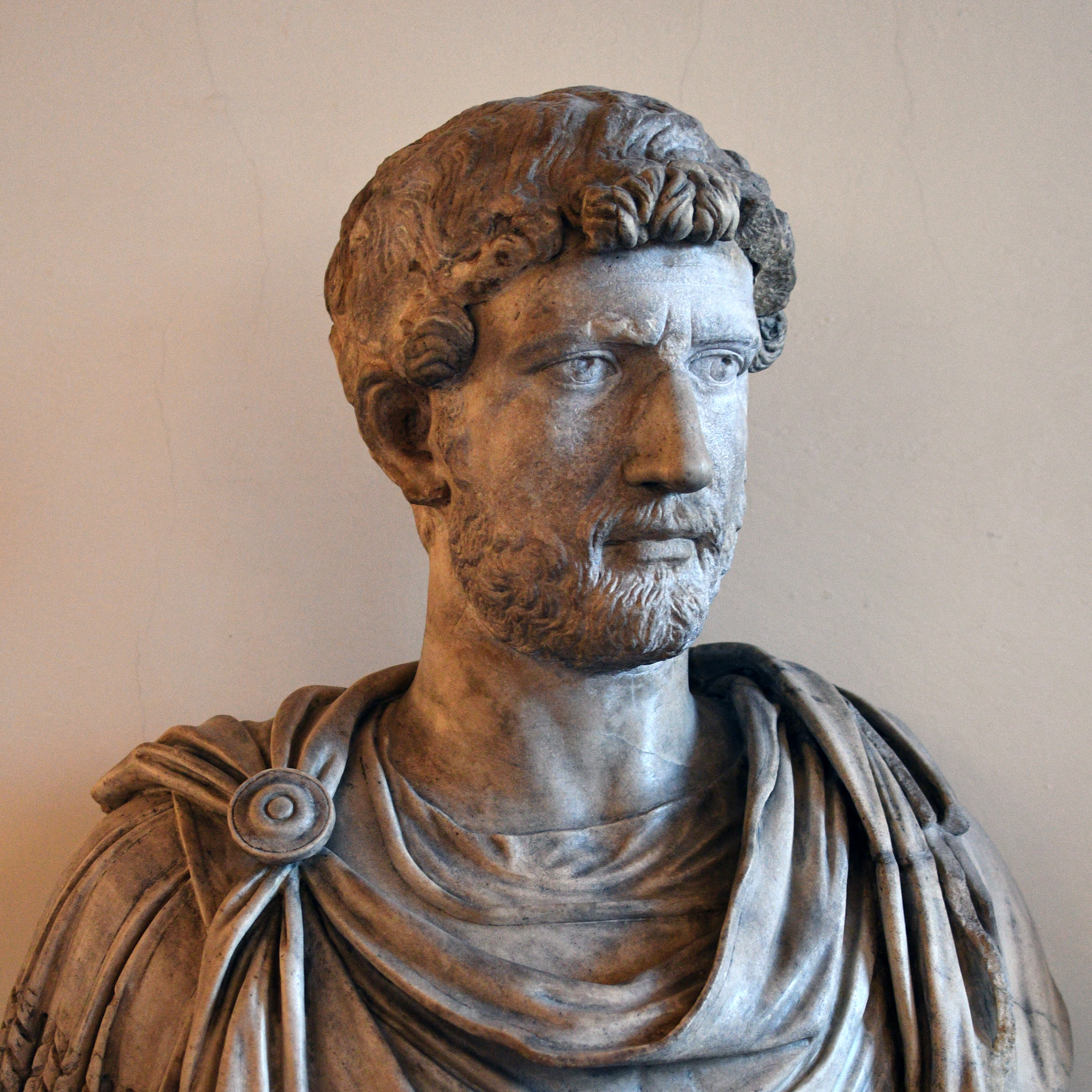
Bust of Emperor Hadrian, Venice National Archaeological Museum

Hadrian has been described as the most versatile of all Roman emperors, who "adroitly concealed a mind envious, melancholy, hedonistic, and excessive with respect to his own ostentation; he simulated restraint, affability, clemency, and conversely disguised the ardor for fame with which he burned." His successor Marcus Aurelius, in his Meditations, lists those to whom he owes a debt of gratitude; Hadrian is conspicuously absent. Hadrian's tense, authoritarian relationship with his Senate was acknowledged a generation after his death by Fronto, himself a senator, who wrote in one of his letters to Marcus Aurelius that "I praised the deified Hadrian, your grandfather, in the senate on a number of occasions with great enthusiasm, and I did this willingly, too [...] But, if it can be said – respectfully acknowledging your devotion towards your grandfather – I wanted to appease and assuage Hadrian as I would Mars Gradivus or Dis Pater, rather than to love him." Fronto adds, in another letter, that he kept some friendships, during Hadrian's reign, "under the risk of my life" (cum periculo capitis). Hadrian underscored the autocratic character of his reign by counting his dies imperii from the day of his acclamation by the armies rather than the senate and legislating by frequent use of imperial decrees to bypass the need for the Senate's approval. The veiled antagonism between Hadrian and the Senate never grew to overt confrontation as had happened during the reigns of overtly "bad" emperors because Hadrian knew how to remain aloof and avoid an open clash. That Hadrian spent half of his reign away from Rome in constant travel probably helped to mitigate the worst of this permanently strained relationship.

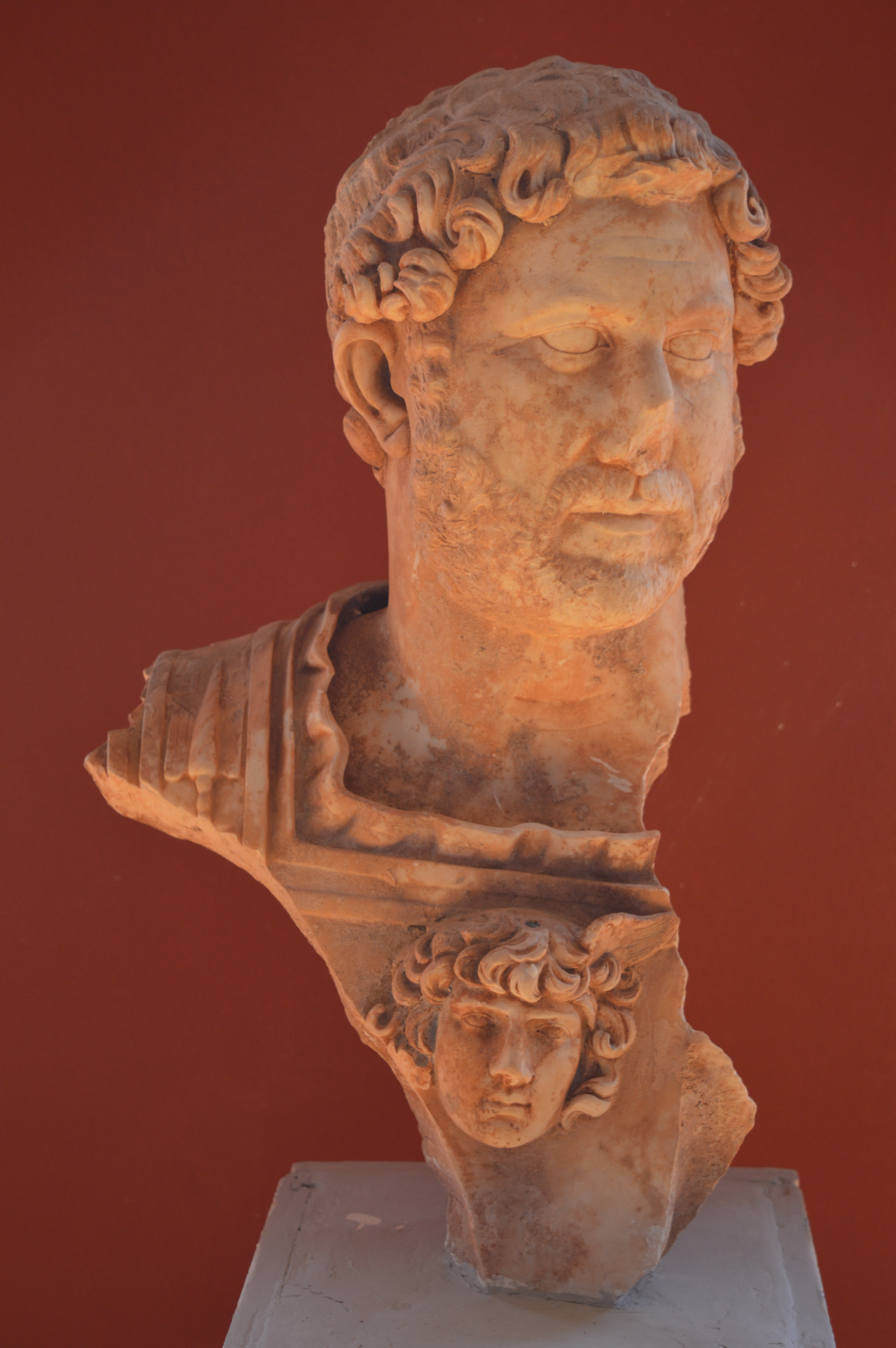
Bust of Hadrian with an Antinous-shaped gorgoneion, 2nd century AD, Museum of Astros, Greece

In 1503, Niccolò Machiavelli, though an avowed republican, esteemed Hadrian as an ideal princeps, one of Rome's Five Good Emperors. Friedrich Schiller called Hadrian "the Empire's first servant". Edward Gibbon admired his "vast and active genius" and his "equity and moderation", and considered Hadrian's era as part of the "happiest era of human history". In Ronald Syme's view, Hadrian "was a Führer, a Duce, a Caudillo". According to Syme, Tacitus' description of the rise and accession of Tiberius is a disguised account of Hadrian's authoritarian Principate. According, again, to Syme, Tacitus' Annals would be a work of contemporary history, written "during Hadrian's reign and hating it".

While the balance of ancient literary opinion almost invariably compares Hadrian unfavourably to his predecessor, modern historians have sought to examine his motives, purposes and the consequences of his actions and policies. For M.A. Levi, a summing-up of Hadrian's policies should stress the ecumenical character of the Empire, his development of an alternate bureaucracy disconnected from the Senate and adapted to the needs of an "enlightened" autocracy, and his overall defensive strategy; this would qualify him as a grand Roman political reformer, creator of an openly absolute monarchy to replace a sham senatorial republic. Robin Lane Fox credits Hadrian as creator of a unified Greco-Roman cultural tradition, and as the end of this same tradition; Hadrian's attempted "restoration" of Classical culture within a non-democratic Empire drained it of substantive meaning, or, in Fox's words, "kill[ed] it with kindness".

== Portraits ==
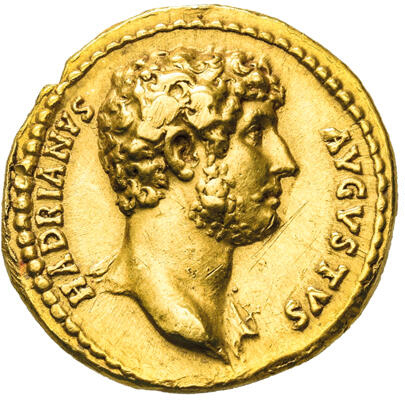
Hadrian Aureus with the portrait type Delta-Omikron, Rome, 129–130 AD. The legend reads as: HADRIANVS AVGVSTVS

Hadrian's portraiture shows him as the first Roman emperor with a beard. Most emperors after him followed his lead. 10 different portrait types are known of Hadrian. A juvenile type with curly hair, broad side burns and a light moustache (but a free chin) was shown on coins later in his life on rare aurei, but likely reflects an early portrait before he became emperor. His first portrait type as Caesar and Augustus used on coins in Mid 117AD shows again broad sideburns merging into a strong moustache and still a free chin. The beard thus resembles beard styles popular in the 19th century like emperor Franz Josef of Austria.

== Sources and historiography ==
In Hadrian's time, there was already a well-established convention that one could not write a contemporary Roman imperial history for fear of contradicting what the emperors wanted to say, read or hear about themselves. As an earlier Latin source, Fronto's correspondence and works attest to Hadrian's character and the internal politics of his rule. Greek authors such as Philostratus and Pausanias wrote shortly after Hadrian's reign, but confined their scope to the general historical framework that shaped Hadrian's decisions, especially those relating the Greek-speaking world, Greek cities and notables. Pausanias especially wrote a lot in praise of Hadrian's benefactions to Greece in general and Athens in particular. Political histories of Hadrian's reign come mostly from later sources, some of them written centuries after the reign itself. The early 3rd-century Roman History by Cassius Dio, written in Greek, gave a general account of Hadrian's reign, but the original is lost, and what survives, aside from some fragments, is a brief, Byzantine-era abridgment by the 11th-century monk Xiphilinius, who focused on Hadrian's religious interests, the Bar Kokhba war, and little else – mostly on Hadrian's moral qualities and his fraught relationship with the Senate. There are various other sources referred to by later commentators, such as the encomium of Aspasius of Byblos, that are now completely lost. The principal source for Hadrian's life and reign is, therefore, in Latin: one of several late 4th-century imperial biographies, collectively known as the Historia Augusta. The collection as a whole is notorious for its unreliability ("a mish mash of actual fact, cloak and dagger, sword and sandal, with a sprinkling of Ubu Roi"), but most modern historians consider its account of Hadrian to be relatively free of outright fictions, and probably based on sound historical sources, principally one of a lost series of imperial biographies by the prominent 3rd-century senator Marius Maximus, who covered the reigns of Nerva through to Elagabalus.

The first modern historian to produce a chronological account of Hadrian's life, supplementing the written sources with other epigraphical, numismatic, and archaeological evidence, was the German 19th-century medievalist Ferdinand Gregorovius. A 1907 biography by Wilhelm Weber, a German nationalist and later Nazi Party supporter, incorporates the same archaeological evidence to produce an account of Hadrian, and especially his Bar Kokhba war, that has been described as ideologically loaded. Epigraphical studies in the post-war period help support alternate views of Hadrian. Anthony Birley's 1997 biography of Hadrian sums up and reflects these developments in Hadrian historiography. The French novelist Marguerite Yourcenar wrote a historical novel entitled "Memoirs of Hadrian" first published in French in 1951.

== Nerva–Antonine family tree ==
Nerva–Antonine family tree

Q. Marcius Barea Soranus	Q. Marcius Barea Sura	Antonia Furnilla	M. Cocceius Nerva	Sergia Plautilla	P. Aelius Hadrianus
Titus (r. 79–81)	Marcia Furnilla	Marcia	Trajanus Pater	Nerva (r. 96–98)	Ulpia (Note: Sister of Trajan's father: Giacosa (1977), p. 7.)	Aelius Hadrianus Marullinus
Flavia (Note: Giacosa (1977), p. 8.)	Marciana (Note: Levick (2014), p. 161.)	C. Salonius Matidius (Note: Husband of Ulpia Marciana: Levick (2014), p. 161.)	Trajan (r. 98–117)	Plotina	P. Acilius Attianus	P. Aelius Afer (Note: Giacosa (1977), p. 7.)	Paulina Major (Note: DIR contributor (Herbert W. Benario, 2000), "Hadrian".)
Lucius Mindius (2)	Libo Rupilius Frugi (3)	Salonia Matidia (Note: Giacosa (1977), p. 9.)	L. Vibius Sabinus (1) (Note: Husband of Salonia Matidia: Levick (2014), p. 161.)
Paulina Minor	L. Julius Ursus Servianus (Note: Smith (1870), "Julius Servianus".)
Matidia Minor	Sabina	Hadrian (Note: Smith (1870), "Hadrian", pp. 319–322.) (r. 117–138)	Antinous (Note: Lover of Hadrian: Lambert (1984), p. 99 and passim; deification: Lambert (1984), pp. 2–5, etc.)
C. Fuscus Salinator I	Julia Serviana Paulina
M. Annius Verus (Note: Husband of Rupilia Faustina: Levick (2014), p. 163.)	Rupilia Faustina (Note: Levick (2014), p. 163.) (Note: It is uncertain whether Rupilia Faustina was Frugi's daughter by Salonia Matidia or another woman.)	Boionia Procilla	Cn. Arrius Antoninus
L. Ceionius Commodus	Appia Severa	C. Fuscus Salinator II
L. Caesennius Paetus	Arria Antonina	Arria Fadilla (Note: Levick (2014), p. 162.)	T. Aurelius Fulvus
L. Caesennius Antoninus	L. Commodus	Plautia	unknown (Note: Levick (2014), p. 164.)	C. Avidius Nigrinus
M. Annius Verus	Calvisia Domitia Lucilla (Note: Wife of M. Annius Verus: Giacosa (1977), p. 10.)	Fundania (Note: Wife of M. Annius Libo: Levick (2014), p. 163.)	M. Annius Libo	Faustina	Antoninus Pius (r. 138–161)	L. Aelius Caesar	Avidia
Cornificia	Marcus Aurelius (r. 161–180) (Note: Giacosa (1977), p. 10.)	Faustina Minor	Aurelia Fadilla	Lucius Verus (r. 161–169) (1)	Ceionia Fabia	Plautius Quintillus (Note: Husband of Ceionia Fabia: Levick (2014), p. 164.)	Q. Servilius Pudens	Ceionia Plautia
Cornificia Minor (Note: Levick (2014), p. 117.)	M. Petronius Sura	Commodus (r. 177–192)	Fadilla	M. Annius Verus Caesar	Ti. Claudius Pompeianus (2)	Lucilla	M. Plautius Quintillus	Junius Licinius Balbus	Servilia Ceionia
Petronius Antoninus	L. Aurelius Agaclytus (2)	Aurelia Sabina	L. Antistius Burrus (1)	Plautius Quintillus	Plautia Servilla	C. Furius Sabinus Timesitheus	Maecia Faustina	Junius Licinius Balbus?
Furia Sabinia Tranquillina	Gordian III (r. 238–244)

- (1) = 1st spouse
- (2) = 2nd spouse
- (3) = 3rd spouse
- Reddish-purple indicates emperor of the Nerva–Antonine dynasty
  lighter purple indicates designated imperial heir of said dynasty who never reigned
  grey indicates unsuccessful imperial aspirants
  bluish-purple indicates emperors of other dynasties
- dashed lines indicate adoption; dotted lines indicate love affairs/unmarried relationships
- Small Caps = posthumously deified (Augusti, Augustae, or other)

Notes:

Except where otherwise noted, the notes below indicate that an individual's parentage is as shown in the above family tree.

References:
- DIR contributors (2000). "De Imperatoribus Romanis: An Online Encyclopedia of Roman Rulers and Their Families".
- Giacosa, Giorgio (1977). Women of the Caesars: Their Lives and Portraits on Coins. Translated by Holloway, R. Ross. Milan: Edizioni Arte e Moneta. ISBN 0-8390-0193-2.
- Lambert, Royston (1984). Beloved and God: The Story of Hadrian and Antinous. New York: Viking. ISBN 0-670-15708-2.
- Levick, Barbara (2014). Faustina I and II: Imperial Women of the Golden Age. Oxford University Press. ISBN 978-0-19-537941-9.
- Smith, William, ed. (1870). Dictionary of Greek and Roman Biography and Mythology.

== See also ==
- Memoirs of Hadrian, a 1951 semi-fictional autobiography of Hadrian, written by Marguerite Yourcenar.
- Phallos, a 2004 novella in which the narrator encounters Hadrian and Antinous just before Antinous's murder and then, once more, minutes afterward, which changes the narrator's life, written by Samuel R. Delany.
- Hadrian, a 2018 opera based on Hadrian's life and death and his relationship with Antinous, composed by Rufus Wainwright.

== Citations ==
Hadrian Nervan–Antonine dynasty Born: 24 January AD 76 Died: 10 July AD 138
Regnal titles
Preceded by Trajan	Roman emperor 117–138	Succeeded by Antoninus Pius
Political offices
Preceded by Ap. Annius Trebonius Gallus, and M. Atilius Bradua as Ordinary consuls	Roman suffect consul 108 with M. Trebatius Priscus	Succeeded by Q. Pompeius Falco, and M. Titius Lustricus Bruttianus as Suffect consuls
Preceded by ignotus, and Gn. Minicius Faustinus as Suffect consuls	Roman consul 118 with Gn. Pedanius Fuscus Salinator (Jan–Feb); Bellicius Tebanianus (March); G. Ummidius Quadratus (May)	Succeeded by L. Pomponius Bassus, and T. Sabinius Barbarus as Suffect consuls
Preceded by L. Pomponius Bassus, and T. Sabinius Barbarus as Suffect consuls	Roman consul 119 with Publius Dasumius Rusticus (Jan–Feb); Aulus Platorius Nepos (March–April)	Succeeded by M. Paccius Silvanus; Q. Coredius Gallus Gargilius Antiquus, and Q. Vibius Gallus as Suffect consuls
