= Antinous =

Lover of Roman emperor Hadrian (c. 111 – 130)

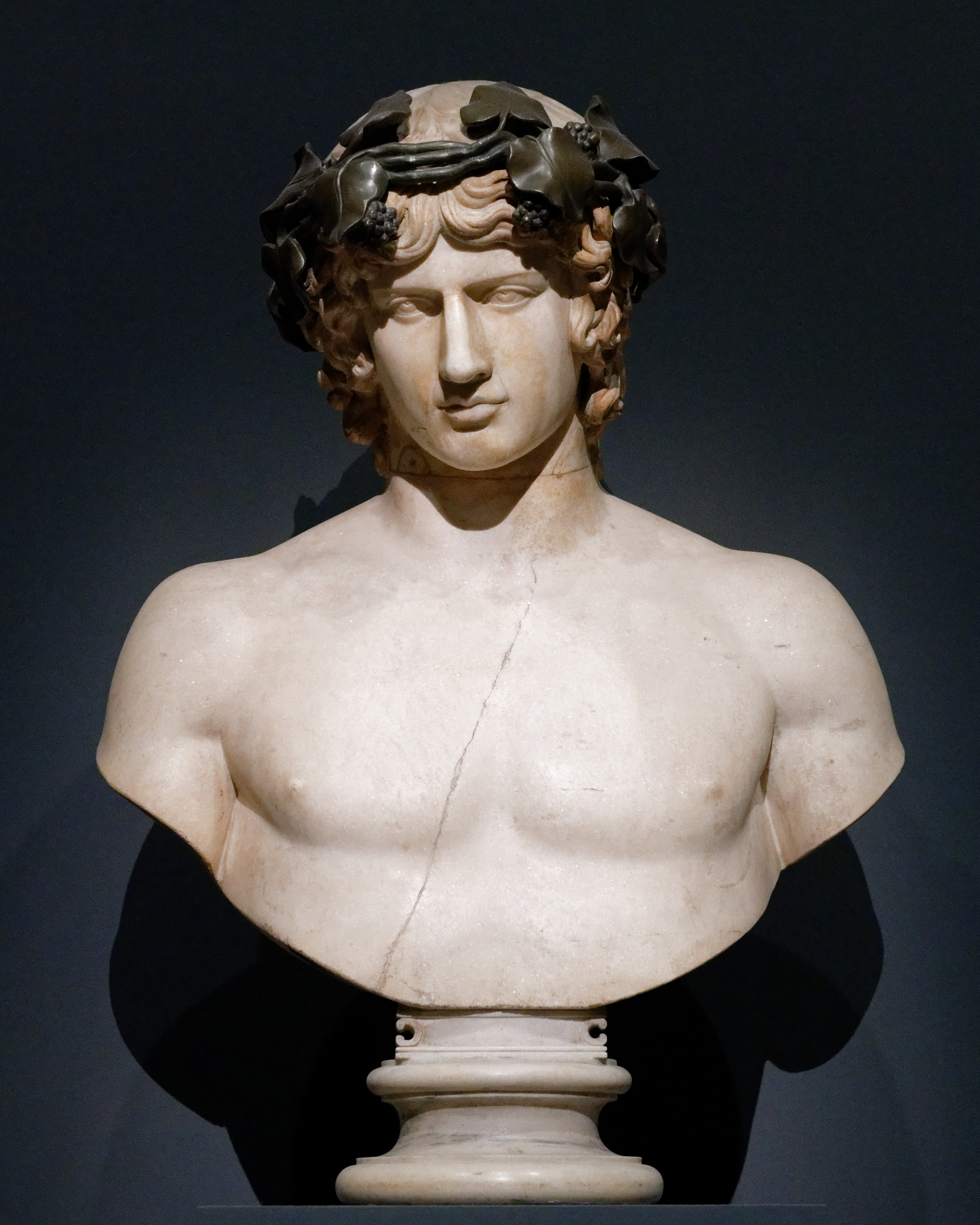
- Bust of Antinous-Dionysus (Hermitage Museum)
- Born: c. 111; Bithynium, Bithynia, Roman Empire
- Died: c. 130 (aged 18–19); River Nile, Heliopolis, Roman Egypt
- Resting place: Hadrian's Villa, Tivoli, Lazio, Italy
- Partner: Hadrian

Antinous, also called Antinoös, (/ænˈtɪnoʊ.əs/; Ancient Greek: Ἀντίνοος; c. 111 – c. 130) (Note: The day and month of his birth come from an inscription on a tablet from Lanuvium dated 136 AD. The year is uncertain, but Antinous was probably about 18 when he drowned, the exact date of which is not clear. His death occurred a few days before 30 October 130 AD, when Hadrian founded the city of Antinoöpolis, possibly on 22 October (the Nile festival) or on 28 October. This period also coincides with the commemoration of the death of Osiris on 24 October. See Lambert 1984, p. 19 and Lambert 1984, p. 129.) was a Greek youth from Bithynia, a favourite and lover of the Roman emperor Hadrian. Following his premature death before his 20th birthday, Antinous was deified on Hadrian's orders, being worshipped in both the Greek East and Latin West, sometimes as a god (θεός, theós) and sometimes merely as a hero (ἥρως, hḗrōs).

Little is known of Antinous's life, although it is known that he was born in Claudiopolis (present day Bolu, Turkey), in the Roman province of Bithynia et Pontus. He was probably introduced to Hadrian in 123, before being taken to Italy for a higher education. He had become the favourite of Hadrian by 128, when he was taken on a tour of the Roman Empire as part of Hadrian's personal retinue. Antinous accompanied Hadrian during his attendance of the annual Eleusinian Mysteries in Athens, and was with him when he killed the Marousian lion in Libya, an event highly publicised by the Emperor. In October 130, as they were part of a flotilla going along the Nile, Antinous died amid mysterious circumstances. Various suggestions have been put forward for how he died, ranging from an accidental drowning to an intentional human sacrifice or suicide.

Following his death, Hadrian deified Antinous and founded an organised cult devoted to his worship that spread throughout the Empire. Hadrian founded the city of Antinoöpolis close to Antinous's place of death, which became a cultic centre for the worship of Osiris-Antinous. Hadrian also founded games in commemoration of Antinous to take place in both Antinoöpolis and Athens, with Antinous becoming a symbol of Hadrian's dreams of pan-Hellenism. The worship of Antinous proved to be one of the most enduring and popular of cults of deified humans in the Roman empire, and events continued to be founded in his honour long after Hadrian's death.

Antinous became a symbol of male homosexuality in Western culture, appearing in the works of Oscar Wilde, Fernando Pessoa and Marguerite Yourcenar.

== Biography ==
=== Birth and childhood ===
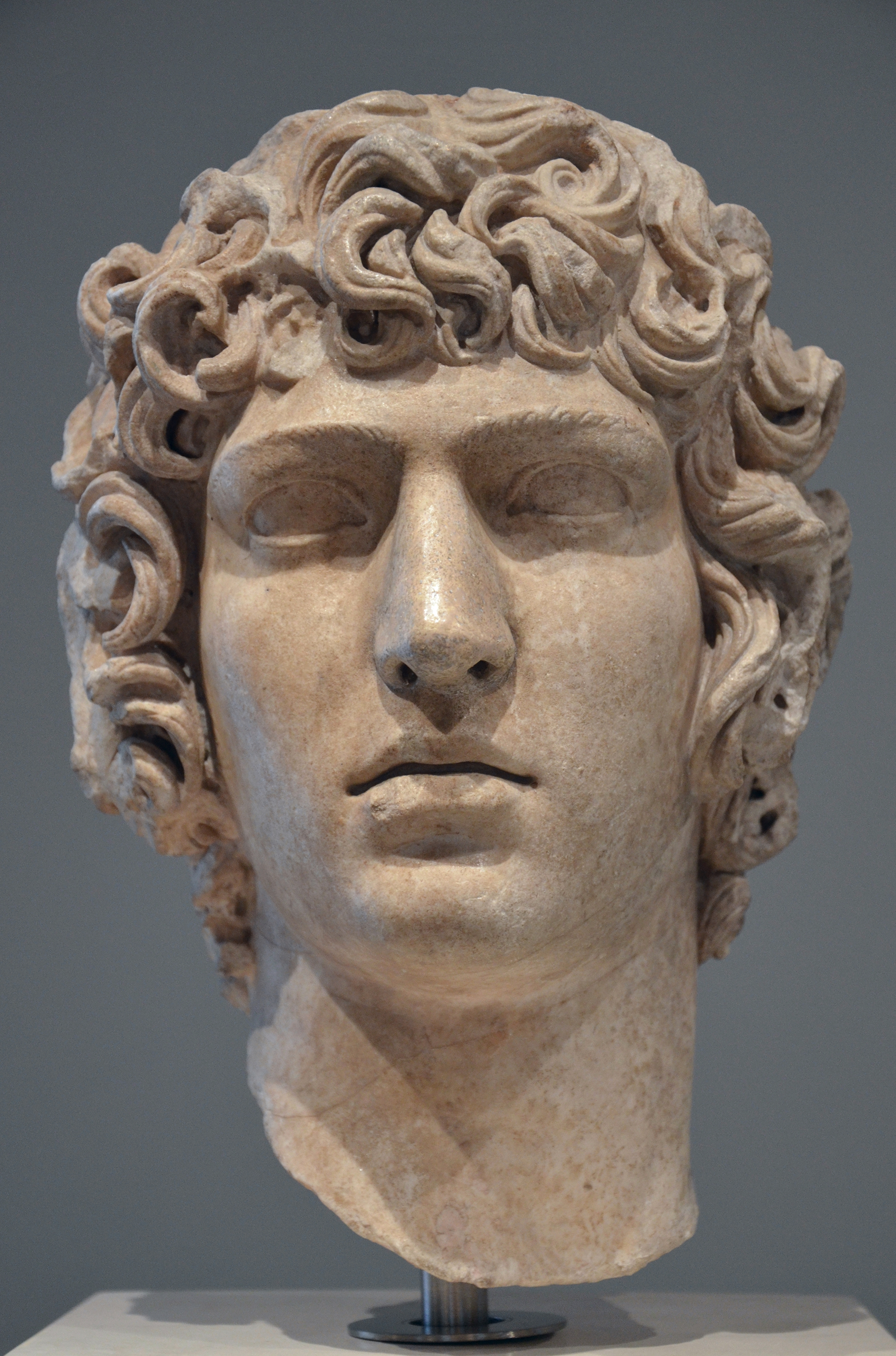
Head of Antinous found at Hadrian's Villa, dating from A.D. 130–138 , now at the Museo Nazionale Romano, Rome, Italy

Antinous was born to a Greek family near the city of Claudiopolis, which was located in the Roman province of Bithynia, in what is now north-west Turkey. He was born in the territory to the east of the city called Mantineion, a rural locality:

This was important later for the cult character expressed in his statues: he was a figure of the country, a woodland boy.

— R. R. R. Smith

The year of Antinous's birth is not recorded, although it is estimated that it was probably between A.D. 110 and 112 . Early sources record that his birthday was in November, and although the exact date is not known, Royston Lambert, one of Antinous's biographers, asserted that it was probably on 27 November. Given the location of his birth and his physical appearance, it is likely that part of his ancestry was not Greek.

=== Status ===
There are various potential origins for the name "Antinous"; it is possible that he was named after the character of Antinous of Ithaca, who is one of Penelope's suitors in Homer's epic poem, the Odyssey. Another possibility is that he was given the male equivalent of "Antinoë", the name of a woman who was one of the founding figures of Mantineia, a city which probably had close relations with Bithynia. Although many historians from the Renaissance onward asserted that Antinous had been a slave, only one of around fifty early sources claims that. This possibility remains unlikely, as it would have been extremely controversial to deify a former slave in Roman society. There is no surviving reliable evidence attesting to Antinous's family background, although Lambert believed it most likely that his family would have been peasant farmers or small business owners, thereby being socially undistinguished yet not from the poorest sectors of society. Lambert also considered it likely that Antinous would have had a basic education as a child, having been taught how to read and write.

=== Life with Hadrian ===
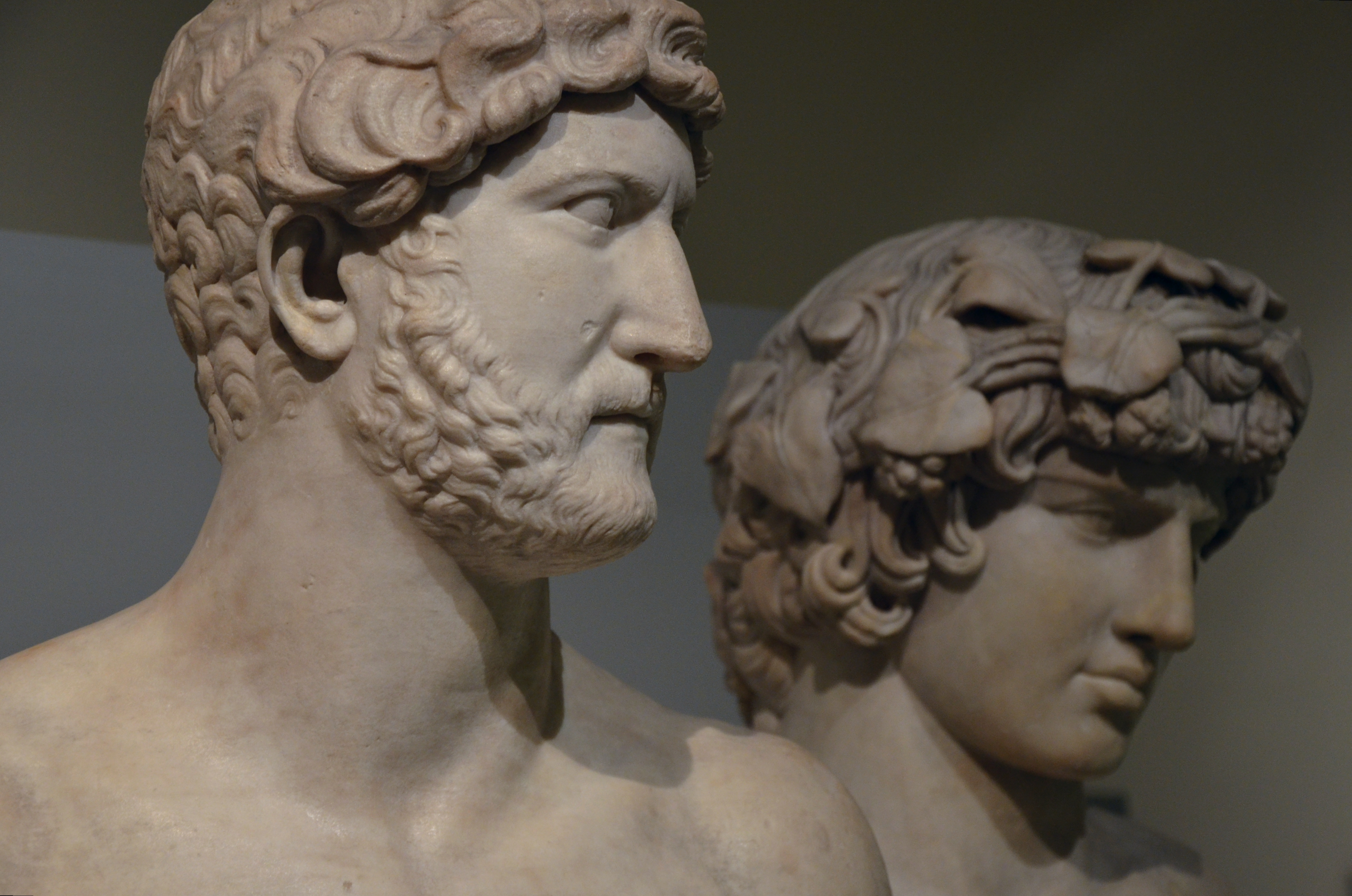
British Museum busts of Hadrian (left) and Antinous (right), both part of the Townley Marbles

The Emperor Hadrian spent much time during his reign touring his empire, and arrived in Claudiopolis in June 123, which was probably when he first encountered Antinous. Given Hadrian's personality, Lambert thought it unlikely that they had become lovers at this point, instead suggesting it probable that Antinous had been selected to be sent to Italy, where he was probably schooled at the imperial paedagogium at the Caelian Hill. Hadrian meanwhile had continued to tour the empire, only returning to Italy in September 125, when he settled into his villa at Tibur. It was at some point over the following three years that Antinous became his personal favourite, for by the time he left for Greece three years later, he brought Antinous with him in his personal retinue:

The way that Hadrian took the boy on his travels, kept close to him at moments of spiritual, moral or physical exaltation, and, after his death, surrounded himself with his images, shows an obsessive craving for his presence, a mystical-religious need for his companionship.

— Excerpt from Royston Lambert's Beloved and God: The Story of Hadrian and Antinous

Lambert described Antinous as "the one person who seems to have connected most profoundly with Hadrian" throughout the latter's life. Hadrian's marriage to Sabina was unhappy, and there is no reliable evidence that he ever expressed a sexual attraction for women, in contrast to much reliable early evidence that he was sexually attracted to boys and young men. For centuries, pederasty existed among Greece's leisured and citizen classes, with an older erastes (the "lover," aged between 20 and 40) undertaking a sexual relationship with an eromenos (the "beloved," aged between 12 and 18) and taking a key role in his (the latter's) education. There is no historical evidence available to support at what age Antinous became a favourite of Hadrian.

It is known that Hadrian believed Antinous to be intelligent and wise, and that they had a shared love of hunting, which was seen as a particularly manly pursuit in Roman culture. Although none survive, it is known that Hadrian wrote both an autobiography and erotic poetry about his boy favourites; it is therefore likely that he wrote about Antinous. During their relationship, there is no evidence that Antinous ever used his influence over Hadrian for personal or political gain.

In March 127, Hadrian—probably accompanied by Antinous—travelled through the Sabine area of Italy, Picenum, and Campania. From 127 to 129, the Emperor was then afflicted with an illness that doctors were unable to explain. In April 128, he laid the foundation stone for a temple of Venus and Rome in the city of Rome, during a ritual where he may well have been accompanied by Antinous. From there, Hadrian went on a tour of North Africa, during which he was accompanied by Antinous. In late 128, Hadrian and Antinous landed in Corinth, proceeding to Athens, where they remained until May 129, accompanied by Empress Sabina; the Caesernii brothers, frequent companions of the Emperor; and Pedanius Fuscus the Younger (a great-nephew of Hadrian). It was in Athens in September 128 that they attended the annual celebrations of the Great Mysteries of Eleusis, where Hadrian was initiated into the position of epoptes in the Telesterion. It is generally agreed, although not definitely proved, that Antinous was also initiated at that time.

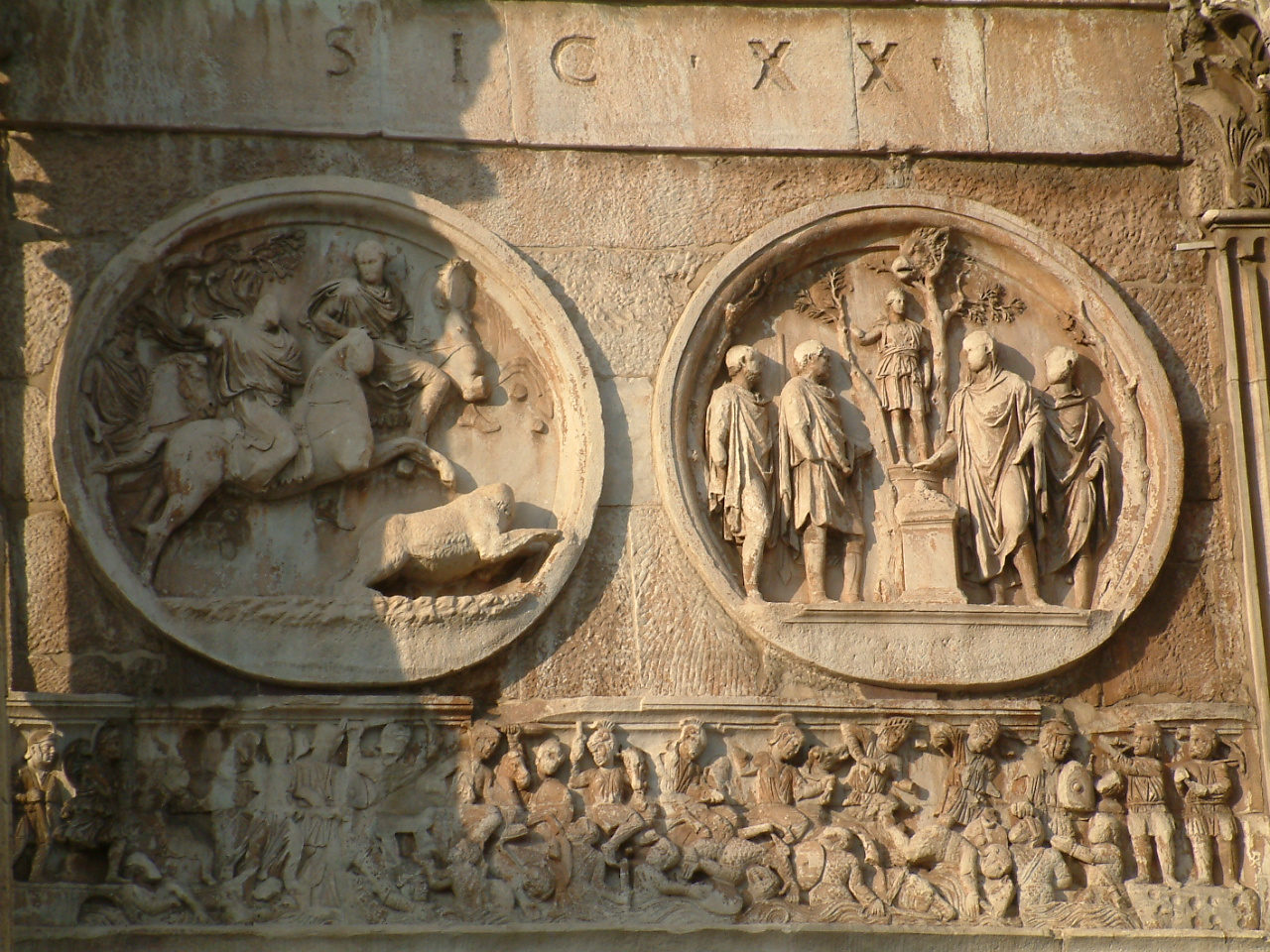
The tondo at left depicting Hadrian's lion hunt, accompanied by Antinous, on the Arch of Constantine in Rome

From there they headed to Asia Minor, settling in Antioch in June 129, where they were based for a year, visiting Syria, Arabia, and Judaea. From there, Hadrian became increasingly critical of Jewish culture, which he feared opposed Romanisation, and so introduced policies banning circumcision and building a Temple of Zeus-Jupiter on the former site of the Jewish Temple. From there, they headed to Egypt. Arriving in Alexandria in August 130, there they visited the sarcophagus of Alexander the Great. Although welcomed with public praise and ceremony, some of Hadrian's appointments and actions angered the city's Hellenic social elite, who began to gossip about his sexual activities, including those with Antinous.

Soon after, and probably in September 130, Hadrian and Antinous travelled west to Libya, where they had heard of a Marousian lion causing problems for local people. They hunted down the lion, and although the exact events are unclear, it is apparent that Hadrian saved Antinous's life during their confrontation with it, before the beast itself was killed. Hadrian widely publicised the event, casting bronze medallions of it, getting historians to write about it, commissioning Pancrates to write a poem about it, and having a tondo depicting it created which was later placed on the Arch of Constantine. On this tondo it was clear that Antinous was no longer a youth, having become more muscular and hairier, perceptibly more able to resist his master; and thus, it is likely that his relationship with Hadrian was changing as a result.

Throughout history there has been much controversy concerning the relationship between Hadrian and Antinous. In Royston Lambert's book Beloved and God, he writes "But as far as the central issues go—the history of Antinous, his relationship with Hadrian and the death—we have precious little more information than the earliest writers." Many of these early writers were biased towards Hadrian especially in regard to his relationship with Antinous.

The controversy surrounding the relationship between Hadrian and Antinous is due to a lack of extant evidence for where Antinous was during the years from 123–130 CE. The first mention of Antinous is from Pancrates and his Lion Hunt poem from 130 CE.

Hard evidence regarding Antinous's life is available in the form of the Pincian obelisk on Pincian Hill. On the west side of the relief is a mutilated phrase which states "he grew up to be a beautiful youth". This would suggest that Antinous was already an ephebe and that he was established in his home in Bithynia when he met Hadrian. Many scholars believe, with the circumstantial evidence, that the relationship of Hadrian and Antinous lasted approximately three years: from 127 CE to October 130 CE, when Antinous drowned in the Nile. The conclusion is that there is little documentation for or about the actual relationship of Hadrian and Antinous.

=== Death ===
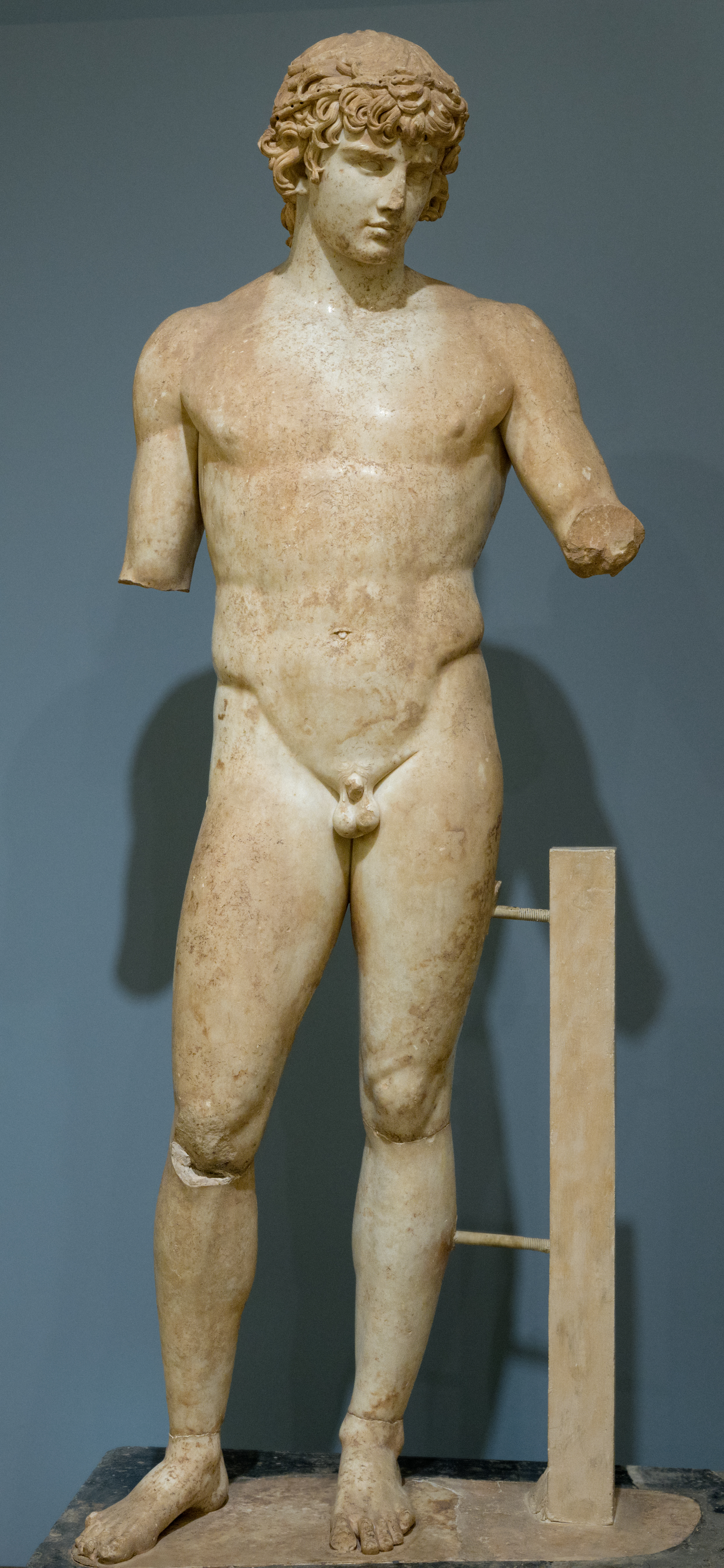
Statue of Antinous (Delphi), polychrome Parian marble, made during the reign of Hadrian (r. 117–138 AD)

In late September or early October 130, Hadrian and his entourage, among them Antinous, assembled at Heliopolis to set sail upstream as part of a flotilla along the River Nile. The retinue included officials, the Prefect, army and naval commanders, as well as literary and scholarly figures. Possibly also joining them was Lucius Ceionius Commodus, a young aristocrat whom Antinous might have deemed a rival to Hadrian's affections. On their journey up the Nile, they stopped at Hermopolis Magna, the primary shrine to the god Thoth. It was shortly after this, in October 130—around the time of the festival of Osiris—that Antinous fell into the river and died, probably from drowning. Hadrian publicly announced his death, with gossip soon spreading throughout the Empire that Antinous had been intentionally killed. The nature of Antinous's death remains a mystery to this day; however, various speculations have been put forward:

1. One possibility is that he was murdered by a conspiracy at court. However, Lambert asserted that this was unlikely because it lacked any supporting historical evidence, and because Antinous himself seemingly exerted little influence over Hadrian, thus meaning that an assassination served little purpose. However, a faction looking to replace Hadrian's attention or affection cannot be ruled out.
2. Some scholars suggest that Antinous may have been killed by Hadrian himself, either in an attempt by the latter to regain his health, or during an argument between the two. Elizabeth Speller, one of Hadrian's biographers, notes that the second idea aligns with the emperor's well-documented fits of anger and violence. However, most scholars reject the notion that Hadrian murdered his own lover, judging by his overwhelming grief at Antinous's death.
3. Another suggestion is that Antinous had died during a voluntary castration as part of an attempt to retain his youth and thus his sexual appeal to Hadrian. However, this is improbable because Hadrian deemed both castration and circumcision to be abominations and, as Antinous was aged between 18 and 20 at the time of death, any such operation would have been ineffective.
4. A fourth possibility is that the death was accidental, perhaps because Antinous was intoxicated. According to his now-lost memoirs, Hadrian himself believed this to be the case.
5. Another possibility is that Antinous represented a voluntary human sacrifice. The earliest surviving suggestion of this comes from the writings of Dio Cassius, 80 years after the event, although it was subsequently repeated in many later sources. In the 2nd-century Roman Empire, a belief that the death of one could rejuvenate the health of another was widespread, and Hadrian had been ill for many years; in this scenario, Antinous could have sacrificed himself in the belief that Hadrian would have recovered. If this last situation were true, Hadrian might not have revealed the cause of Antinous's death because he did not wish to appear either physically or politically weak. Conversely, opposing this possibility is the fact that Hadrian disliked human sacrifice and had strengthened laws against it in the Empire.

== Deification and the cult of Antinous ==
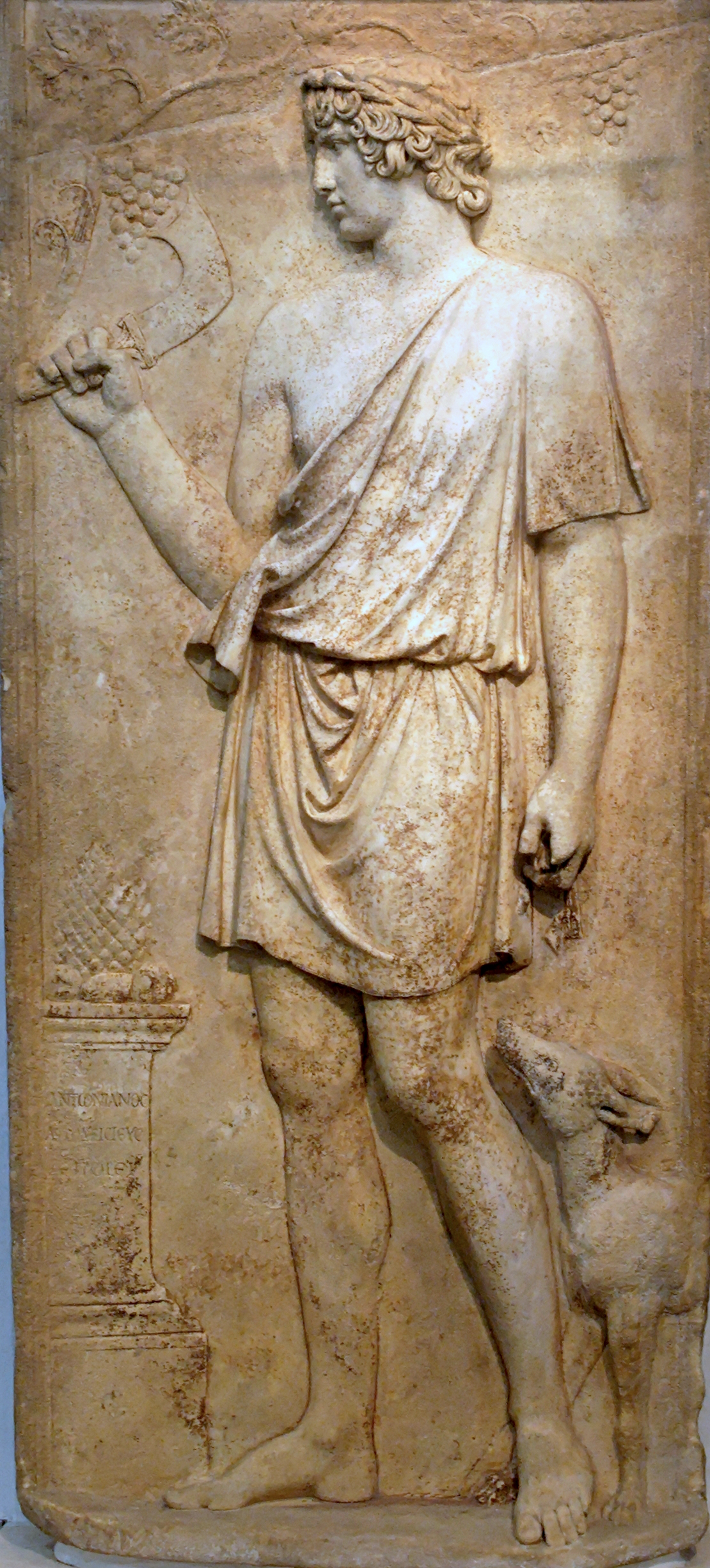
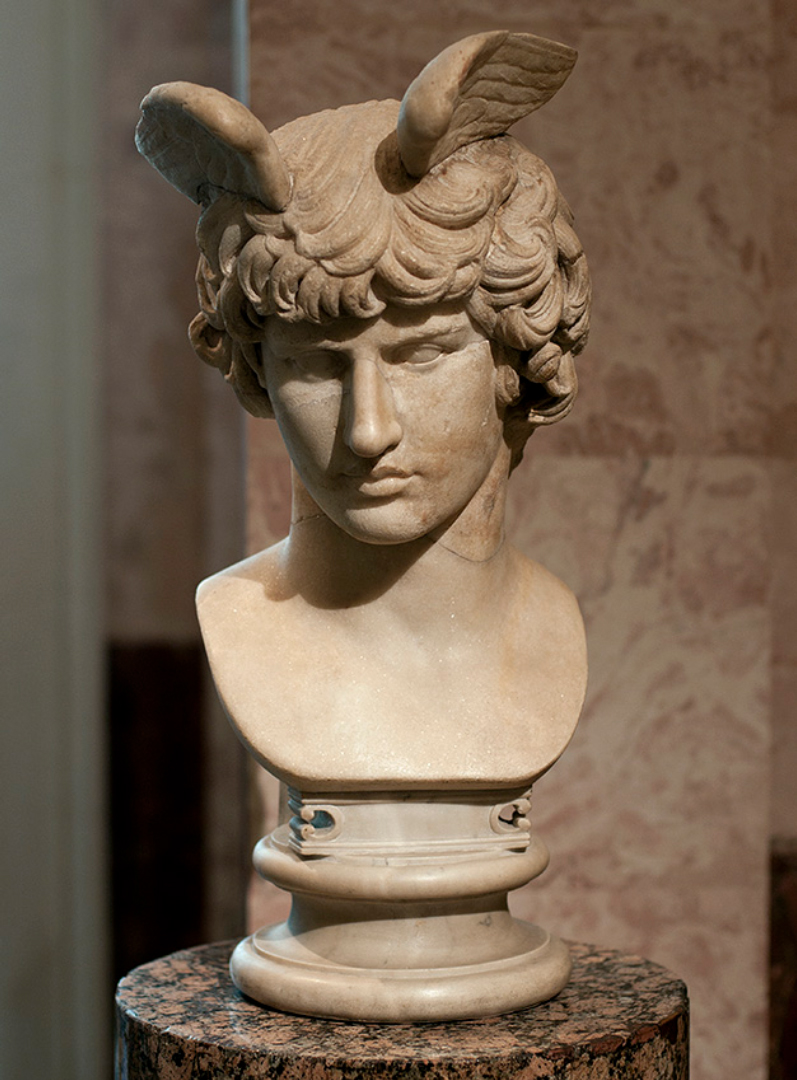
(left) Marble relief from 130–138 CE depicting Antinous, either as Dionysos or Silvanus, harvesting grapes. (right) Bust of Antinous as the god Mercury from the collection of Catherine the Great, now at the Hermitage Museum, Saint Petersburg, Russia

Hadrian was devastated by the death of Antinous, with contemporaries attesting that he "wept like a woman." In Egypt, the local priesthood immediately deified Antinous by identifying him with Osiris due to the manner of his death. In keeping with Egyptian custom, Antinous's body was probably embalmed and mummified by priests, a lengthy process which might explain why Hadrian remained in Egypt until spring 131. While there, in October 130, Hadrian proclaimed Antinous to be a deity and announced that a city should be built on the site of his death in commemoration of him, to be called Antinoöpolis. The deification of human beings was not uncommon in the Classical world. However, the public and formal divinisation of humans was reserved for the Emperor and members of the imperial family. Thus, Hadrian's decision to declare Antinous a god and create a formal cult devoted to him was highly unusual, and he did so without the permission of the Roman Senate. The Emperor was criticised for his immense grief at Antinous's death, especially considering that he had delayed the apotheosis of his own sister Paulina when she died. (Note: Hadrian's "Hellenic" emotionalism finds a culturally sympathetic echo in the Homeric Achilles' mourning for his friend Patroclus) Although the cult of Antinous therefore had connections with the Roman imperial cult, it remained separate and distinct. Hadrian also identified a star in the sky between the Eagle and the Zodiac to be Antinous, and came to associate the rosy lotus that grew on the banks of the Nile as being the flower of Antinous.

It is unknown exactly where Antinous's body was buried. It has been argued that either his body or some relics associated with him would have been interred at a shrine in Antinoöpolis, although this has yet to be identified archaeologically. However, a surviving obelisk contains an inscription strongly suggesting that Antinous's body was interred at Hadrian's country estate, the Villa Adriana at Tibur in Italy.

It is unclear whether Hadrian genuinely believed that Antinous had become a god. He would have also had political motives for creating the organised cult, for it enshrined political and personal loyalties specifically to him. In October 131, Hadrian proceeded to Athens, where from 131/32 he founded the Panhellenion, an attempt to nurture consciousness of Greek identity, to erode the feuding endemic to the Greek city-states, and to promote the worship of the ancient gods; being Greek himself, Antinous as a god assisted Hadrian's cause in this, presenting a symbol of pan-Hellenic unity. In Athens, Hadrian also established a festival to be held in honour of Antinous in October, the Antinoeia.

Antinous was understood differently by his various worshippers, in part due to regional and cultural variation. In some inscriptions he is identified as a divine hero, in others as a god, and in others as both a divine hero and a god. In Egypt, he was often understood as a daemon. Inscriptions indicate that Antinous was seen primarily as a benevolent deity, who could be turned to aid his worshipers and cure them of ailments. He was also seen as a conqueror of death, with his name and image often being included in coffins. In the west, Antinous was associated with the Celtic sun-god Belenos.

Emperor Hadrian established quinquennial games and annual celebrations in honour of Antinous which were called Antinoea (τὰ Ἀντινόεια).

=== Antinoöpolis ===
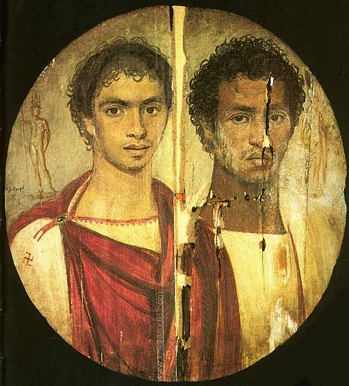
2nd-century funeral portrait depicting two men of the cult of Antinous. Tempera painting on wooden panel, now at the Egyptian Museum

The city of Antinoöpolis was erected on the site of Hir-we. All previous buildings were razed and replaced, with the exception of the Temple of Ramses II. Hadrian also had political motives for the creation of Antinoöpolis, which was to be the first Hellenic city in the Middle Nile region, thus serving as a bastion of Greek culture within the Egyptian area. To encourage Egyptians to integrate with this imported Greek culture, he permitted Greeks and Egyptians in the city to marry and allowed the main deity of Hir-we, Bes, to continue to be worshipped in Antinoöpolis alongside the new primary deity, Osiris-Antinous. He encouraged Greeks from elsewhere to settle in the new city, using various incentives to do so. The city was designed on a Hippodamian grid that was typical of Hellenic cities, and embellished with columns and many statues of Antinous, as well as a temple devoted to the deity.

Hadrian proclaimed that games would be held at the city in Spring 131 in commemoration of Antinous. Known as the Antinoeia, they would be held annually for several centuries, being noted as the most important in Egypt. Events included athletic competitions, chariot and equestrian races, and artistic and musical festivals, with prizes including citizenship, money, tokens, and free lifetime maintenance.

Antinoöpolis continued to grow into the Byzantine era, being Christianised with the conversion of the Empire. However, it retained an association with magic for centuries to come. Over the centuries, stone from the Hadrianic city was removed for the construction of homes and mosques. By the 18th century, the ruins of Antinoöpolis were still visible, being recorded by such European travellers as Jesuit missionary Claude Sicard in 1715 and Edme-François Jomard the surveyor c. 1800. However, in the 19th century, Antinoöpolis was almost completely destroyed by local industrial production, as the chalk and limestone were burned for powder while stone was used in the construction of a nearby dam and sugar factory.

An excavation of the city in the early twentieth century revealed a relatively realistic funeral tondo painted on wood. Although the men in the portrait are traditionally identified as brothers, there is speculation that they were lovers, the reason for this being that behind the beardless figure is a representation of Antinous-Osiris, the only pictorial representation that has survived of a statue of the deified young man.

=== The cult's spread ===
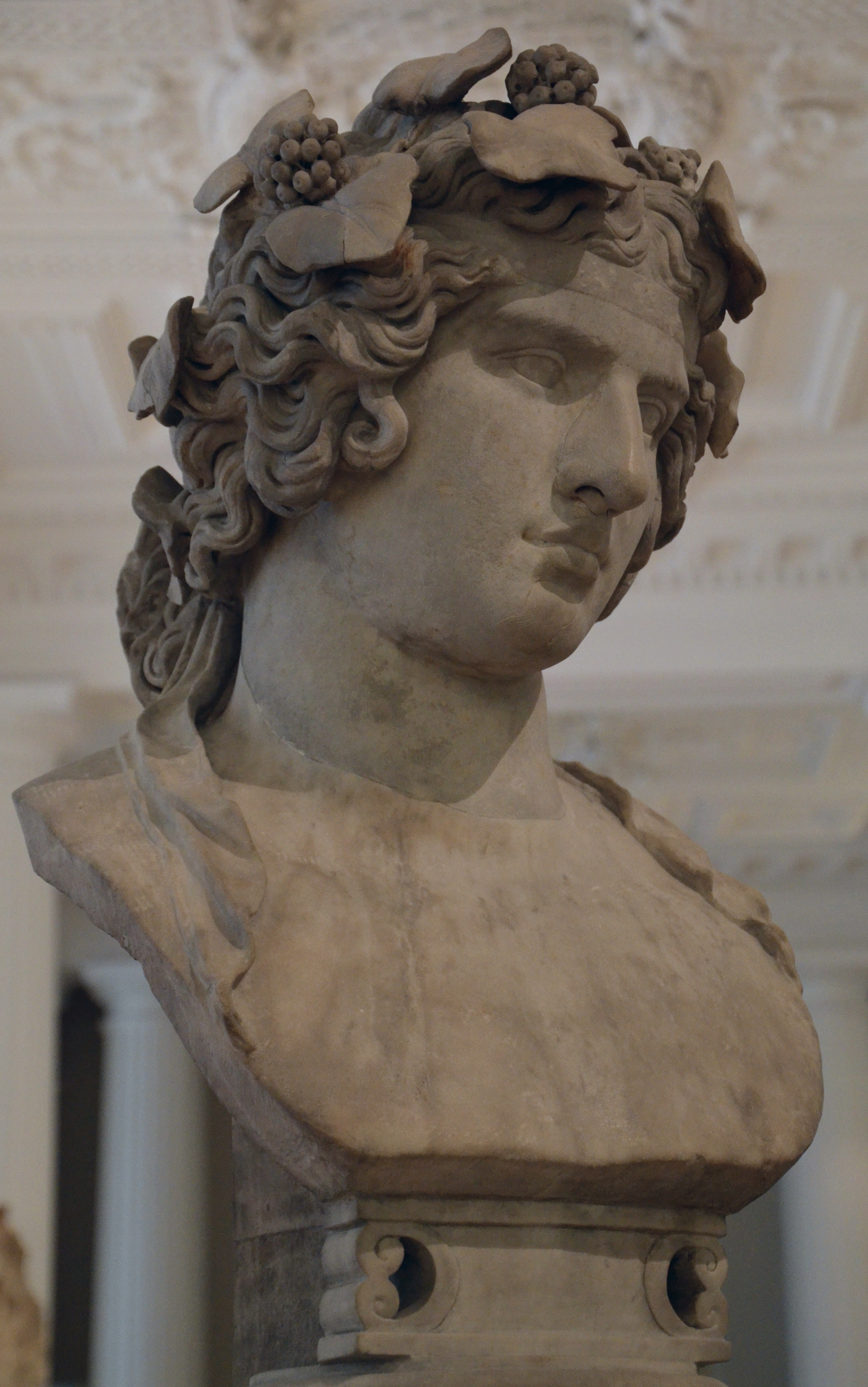
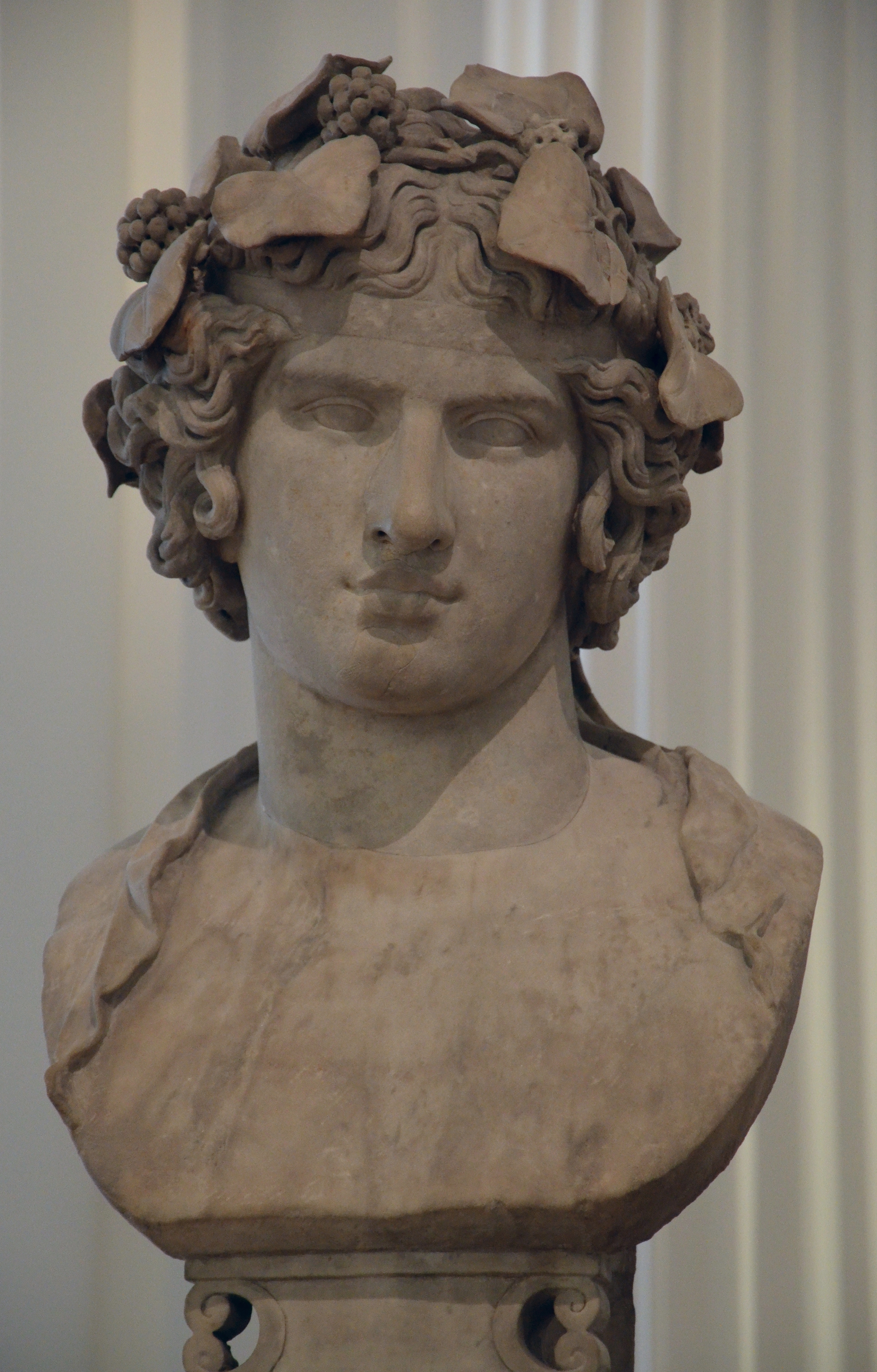
The "Lansdowne Antinous" was found at Hadrian's Villa in 1769 (Fitzwilliam Museum, Cambridge).

Hadrian was keen to disseminate the cult of Antinous throughout the Roman Empire. He focused on its spread within the Greek lands, and in Summer 131 travelled these areas promoting it by presenting Antinous in a syncretised form with the more familiar deity Hermes. On a visit to Trapezus in 131, he proclaimed the foundation of a temple devoted to Hermes, where the deity was probably venerated as Hermes-Antinous. Although Hadrian preferred to associate Antinous with Hermes, he was far more widely syncretised with the god Dionysus across the Empire. The cult also spread through Egypt, and within a few years of its foundation, altars and temples to the god had been erected in Hermopolis, Alexandria, Oxyrhynchus, Tebytnis, Lykopolis, and Luxor.

The cult of Antinous was never as large as those of well-established deities such as Zeus, Dionysus, Demeter, or Asclepios, or even as large as those of cults which were growing in popularity at that time, such as Isis or Serapis and was also smaller than the official imperial cult of Hadrian himself. However, it spread rapidly throughout the Empire, with traces of the cult having been found in at least 70 cities. The cult was most popular in Egypt, Greece, Asia Minor, and the North African coast, but a large community of worshippers also existed in Italy, Spain, and northwestern Europe. Artefacts in honour of Antinous have been found in an area that spans from Britain to the Danube.

Although the adoption of the Antinous cult was in some cases done to please Hadrian, the evidence makes it clear that the cult was also genuinely popular among the different societal classes in the Empire. Archaeological finds point that Antinous was worshipped in both public and private settings. In Egypt, Athens, Macedonia, and Italy, children would be named after the deity. Part of the appeal was that Antinous had once been an ordinary person himself, and thus was more relatable than many other deities. It is also possible, however, that his cult borrowed power from parallels between Antinous and beautiful young male immortals in the Greco-Roman pantheon like Apollo, Dionysus, and Silvanus as well as mortal youths beloved by gods in classical mythology like Ganymede, Hylas, Hyacinth, and Narcissus, and that images of the sensuous youth invited imaginary erotic bonding between him and his worshippers. These characteristics were common also to the cults of Attis, Endymion, and Adonis. Like the latter, Antinous was treated as a dying-and-rising god not only in Egypt, but in Rome and Greece; the Obelisk of Antinous in Rome describes the honour and, "Osirantinous" as "the Reborn" and "the Everlasting."

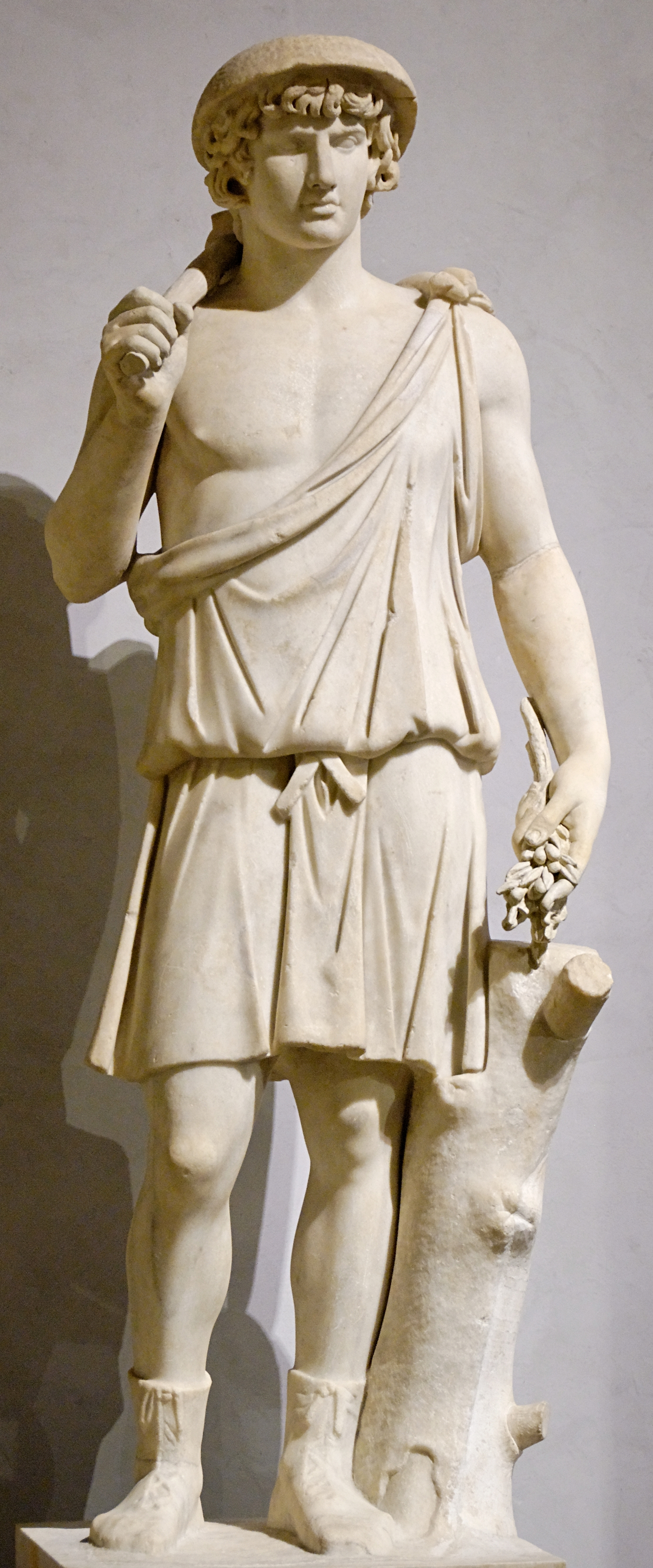
Antinous as Aristaeus from the collection of Cardinal Richelieu, now at the Louvre

At least 28 temples were constructed for the worship of Antinous throughout the Empire, although most were fairly modest in design; those at Tarsos, Philadelphia, and Lanuvium consisted of a four-column portico. It is likely, however, that those which Hadrian was directly involved in, such as at Antinoöpolis, Bithynion, and Mantineia, were often grander, while in the majority of cases, shrines or altars to Antinous would have been erected in or near the pre-existing temples of the imperial cult, or Dionysus or Hermes. Worshippers would have given votive offerings to the deity at these altars; there is evidence that he was given gifts of food and drink in Egypt, with libations and sacrifices probably being common in Greece. Priests devoted to Antinous would have overseen this worship, with the names of some of these individuals having survived in inscriptions. There is evidence of oracles being present at a number of Antinoan temples.

Sculptures of Antinous became widespread, with Hadrian probably having approved a basic model of Antinous's likeness for other sculptors to follow. These sculptures were produced in large quantities between 130 and 138, with estimates being in the region of around 2,000, of which at least 115 survive. Forty-four have been found in Italy, half of which were at Hadrian's Villa Adriana, while 12 have been found in Greece and Asia Minor, and 6 in Egypt. Over 31 cities in the Empire, the majority in Greece and Asia Minor, issued coins depicting Antinous, chiefly between the years 134–35. Many were designed to be used as medallions rather than currency, some of them deliberately made with a hole so that they could be hung from the neck and used as talismans. Most production of Antinous-based artefacts ceased following the 130s, although such items continued to be used by the cult's followers for several centuries. Later survivals of his cult largely rested in the Eastern Roman Empire, where his acceptance into the pantheon of gods was better received.

Games held in honour of Antinous were held in at least 9 cities and included both athletic and artistic components. The games at Bythynion, Antinoöpolis, and Mantineia were still active by the early 3rd century, while those at Athens and Eleusis were still operating in 266–67. Rumours spread throughout the Empire that at Antinous's cultic centre in Antinoöpolis, there were "sacred nights" characterised by drunken revelries, perhaps including sexual orgies. The cult of Antinous endured far beyond Hadrian's reign. Local coins depicting his effigy were still being struck during Caracalla's reign, and he was invoked in a poem to celebrate the accession of Diocletian, who reigned more than a century after Antinous's death.

=== Condemnation and decline ===
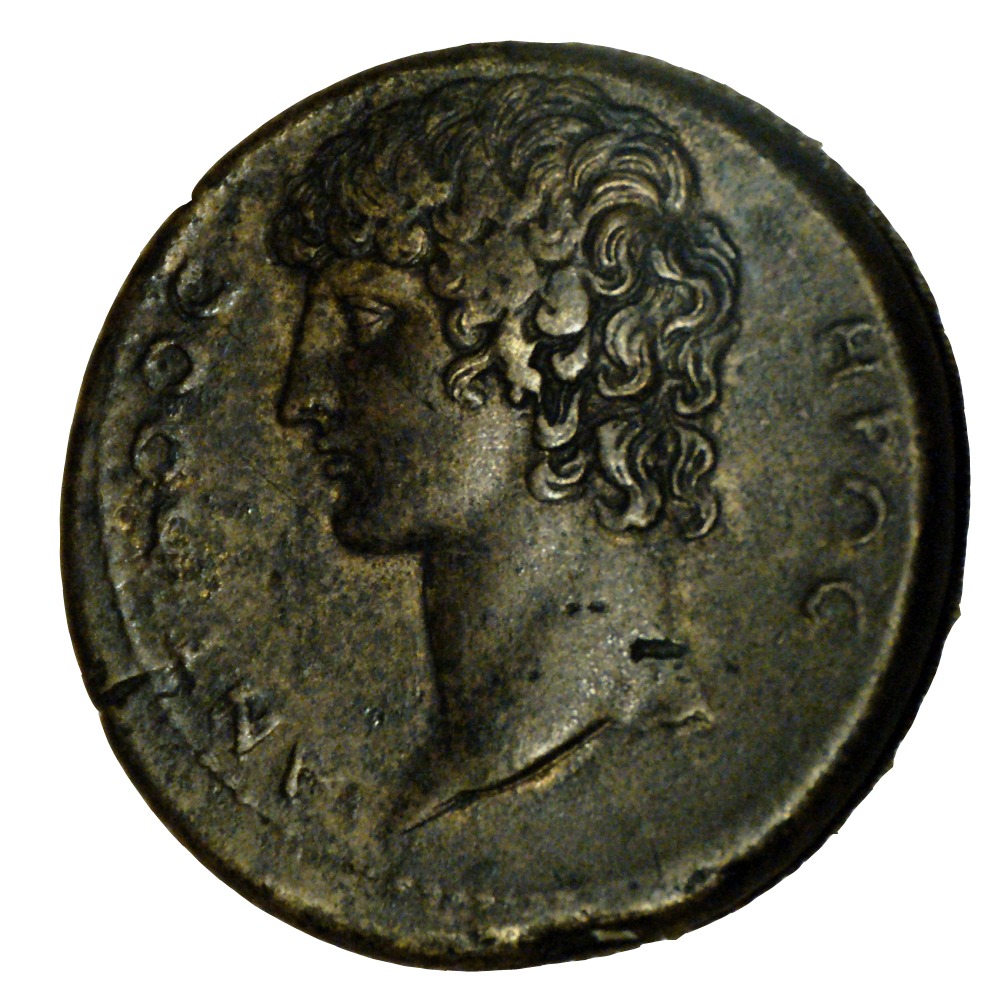
Bronze medallion minted by the city of Smyrna sometime between A.D. c. 117 and c. 138, during the reign of Hadrian. The reverse depicts a bust of Antinoos with inscription ΑΝΤΙΝΟΟϹ ΗΡΩϹ ("Antinoos hero")

The cult of Antinous was criticised by various individuals, both pagan and Christian. Critics included followers of other pagan cults, such as Pausanias, Lucian, and the Emperor Julian, who were all sceptical about the apotheosis of Antinous, as well as the Sibylline Oracles, who were critical of Hadrian more generally. The pagan philosopher Celsus also criticised it for what he perceived as the debauched nature of its Egyptian devotees, arguing that it led people into immoral behaviour, in this way comparing it to Christianity. Surviving examples of Christian condemnation of the Antinous cults come from figures like Tertullian, Origen, Jerome, and Epiphanios. Viewing the religion as a blasphemous rival to Christianity, they insisted that Antinous had simply been a mortal human and condemned his sexual activities with Hadrian as immoral. Associating his cult with malevolent magic, they argued that Hadrian had imposed his worship through fear.

During the struggles between Christians and pagan worshippers in Rome during the 4th century, Antinous was championed by members of the latter. As a result of this, the Christian poet Prudentius denounced his worship in 384, while a set of seven contorniates depicting Antinous were issued, based upon the designs of those issued in the 130s. Many sculptures of Antinous were destroyed by Christians, as well as by invading barbarian tribes, although in some instances were then re-erected; the Antinous statue at Delphi had been toppled and had its forearms broken off, before being re-erected in a chapel elsewhere. Many of the images of Antinous remained in public places until the official prohibition of pagan religions under the reign of Emperor Theodosius in 391.

Some contemporary Neo-Pagan groups have re-sacralised Antinous. Because of his same-sex relationship with Hadrian, Antinous's modern cult mainly appeals to members of the LGBT community, especially gay men.

== In Roman sculpture ==
The surviving statues show a well-proportioned body, with downcast eyes and thick, curly hair nestling at the nape of the neck. It is a very classical and, unsurprisingly, a very Greek image. And it is one which remains very familiar as the archetype of perfect beauty. Antinous was not just the last pagan god; he was the inspiration of the last glorious fluorescence of classical art.

— Excerpt from Elizabeth Speller's Following Hadrian: A Second-Century Journey through the Roman Empire

Hadrian "turned to Greek sculptors to perpetuate the melancholy beauty, diffident manner, and lithe and sensuous frame of his boyfriend Antinous," creating in the process what has been described as "the last independent creation of Greco-Roman art". It is traditionally assumed that they were all produced between Antinous's death in 130 and that of Hadrian in 138, on the questionable grounds that no-one else would be interested in commissioning them. The assumption is that official models were sent out to provincial workshops all over the empire to be copied, with local variations permitted. It has been asserted that many of these sculptures "share distinctive features—a broad, swelling chest, a head of tousled curls, a downcast gaze—that allow them to be instantly recognized".

About a hundred statues of Antinous have been preserved for modernity, a remarkable fact considering that his cult was the target of intense hostility by Christian apologists, many of whom vandalised and destroyed artefacts and temples built in honour of the youth. By 2005, classicist Caroline Vout could note that more images have been identified of Antinous than of any other figure in classical antiquity with the exceptions of Augustus and Hadrian. She also asserted that the Classical study of these Antinous images was particularly important because of his "rare mix" of "biographical mystery and overwhelming physical presence".

Lambert believed that the sculptures of Antinous "remain without doubt one of the most elevated and ideal monuments to pederastic love of the whole ancient world", also describing them as "the final great creation of classical art".

There are also statues in many archaeological museums in Greece including the National Archaeological Museum in Athens, the archaeological museums of Patras, Chalkis and Delphi. Although these may well be idealised images, they demonstrate what all contemporary writers described as Antinous's extraordinary beauty. Although many of the sculptures are instantly recognisable, some offer significant variation in terms of the suppleness and sensuality of the pose and features versus the rigidity and typical masculinity. In 1998, monumental remains were discovered at Hadrian's Villa that archaeologists claimed were from the tomb of Antinous, or a temple to him, though this has been challenged both because of the inconclusive nature of the archaeological remains and the overlooking of patristic sources (Epiphanius, Clement of Alexandria) indicating that Antinous was buried at his temple in Antinoöpolis, the Egyptian city founded in his honour.

=== List ===
Depictions of Antinous

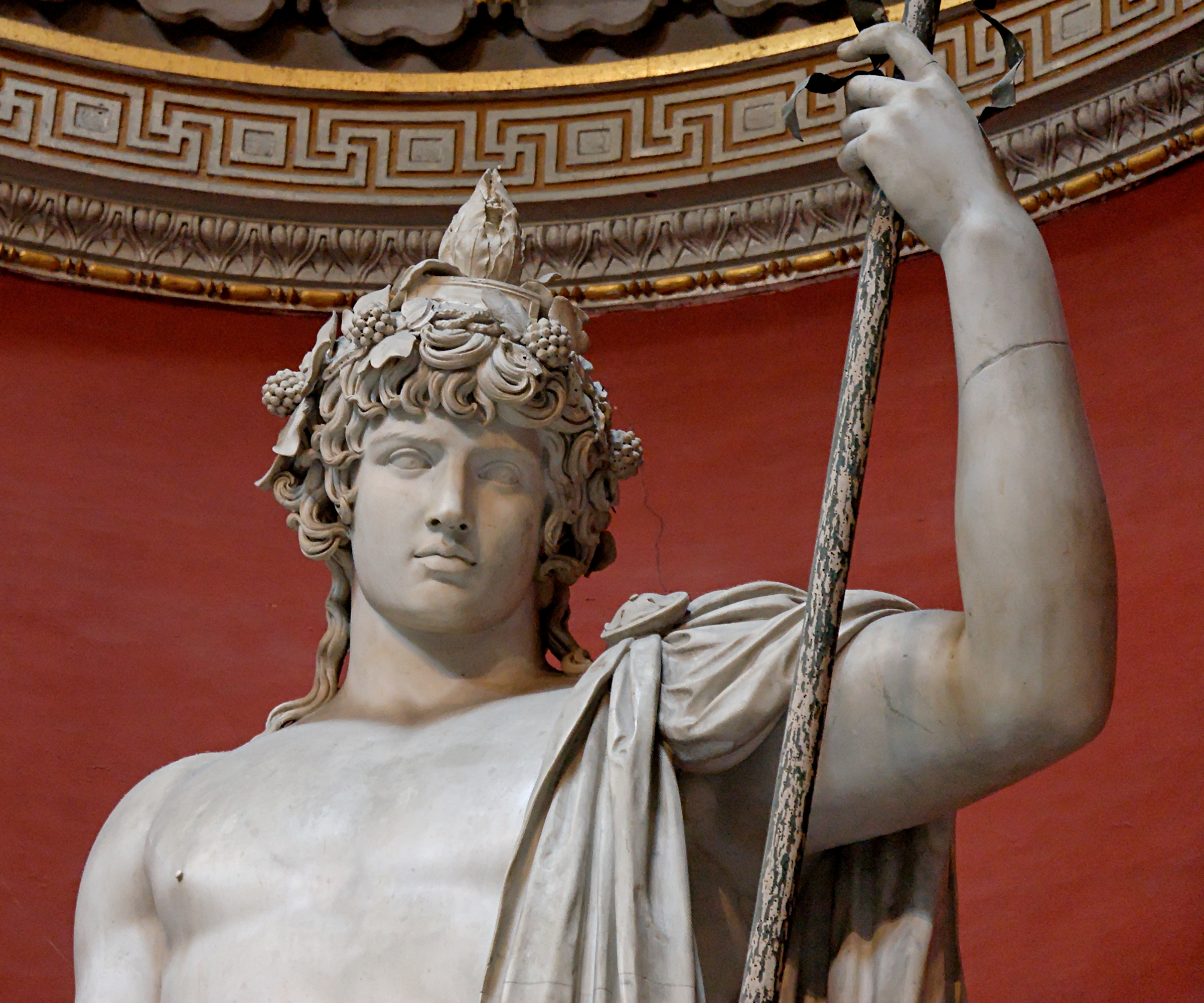
Antinous as Bacchus at the Vatican Museums

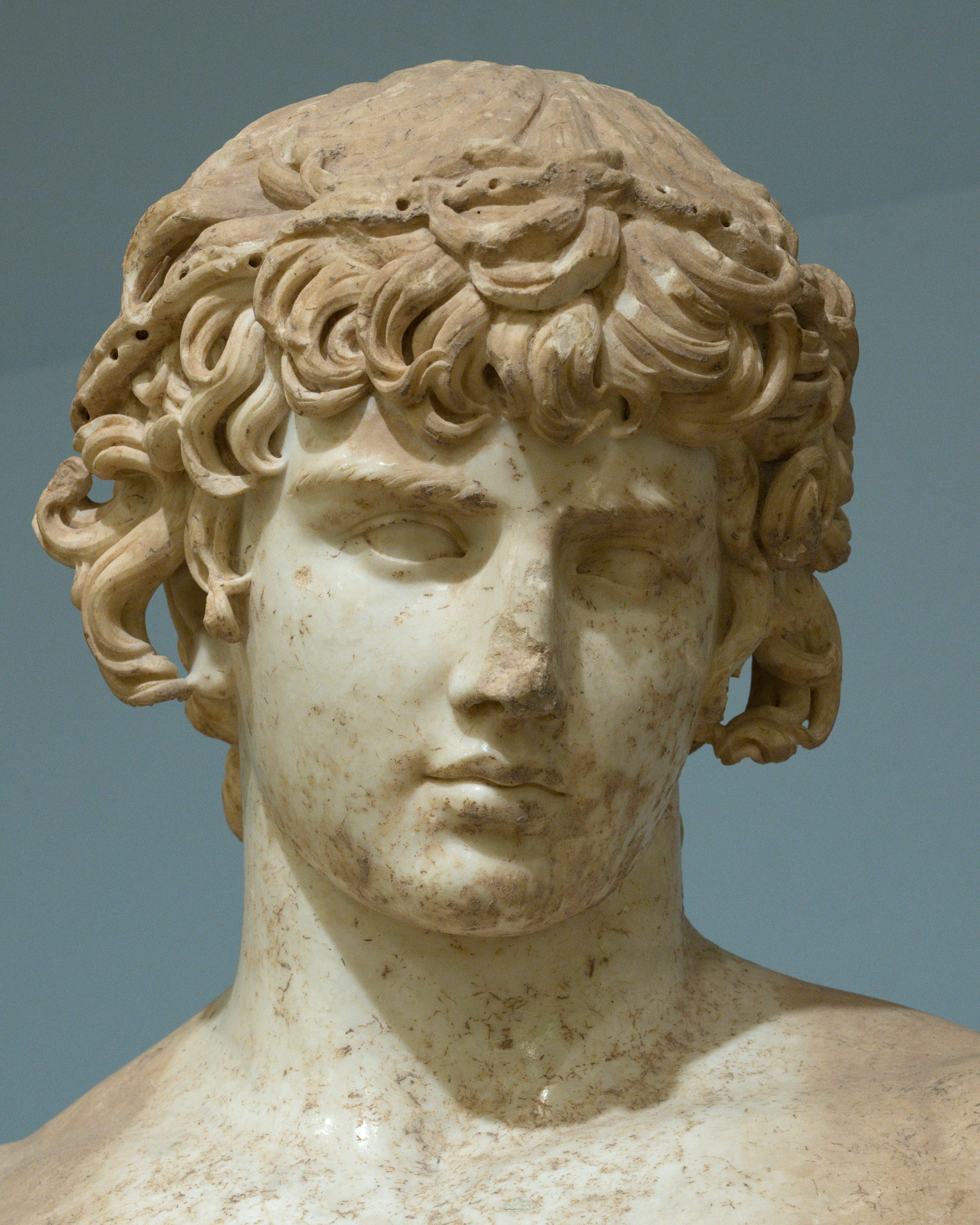
From Delphi

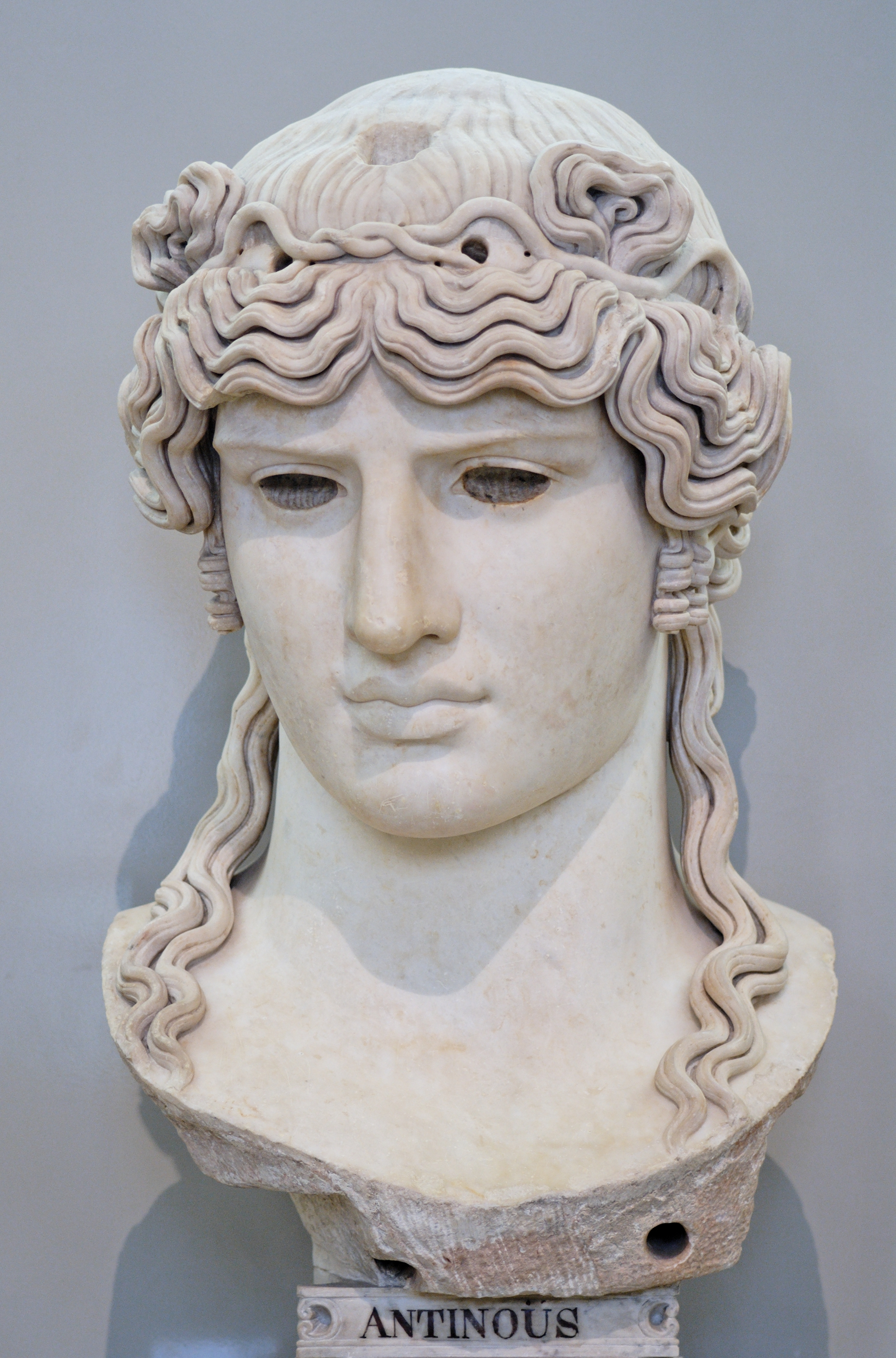
Antinous Mondragone at the Louvre

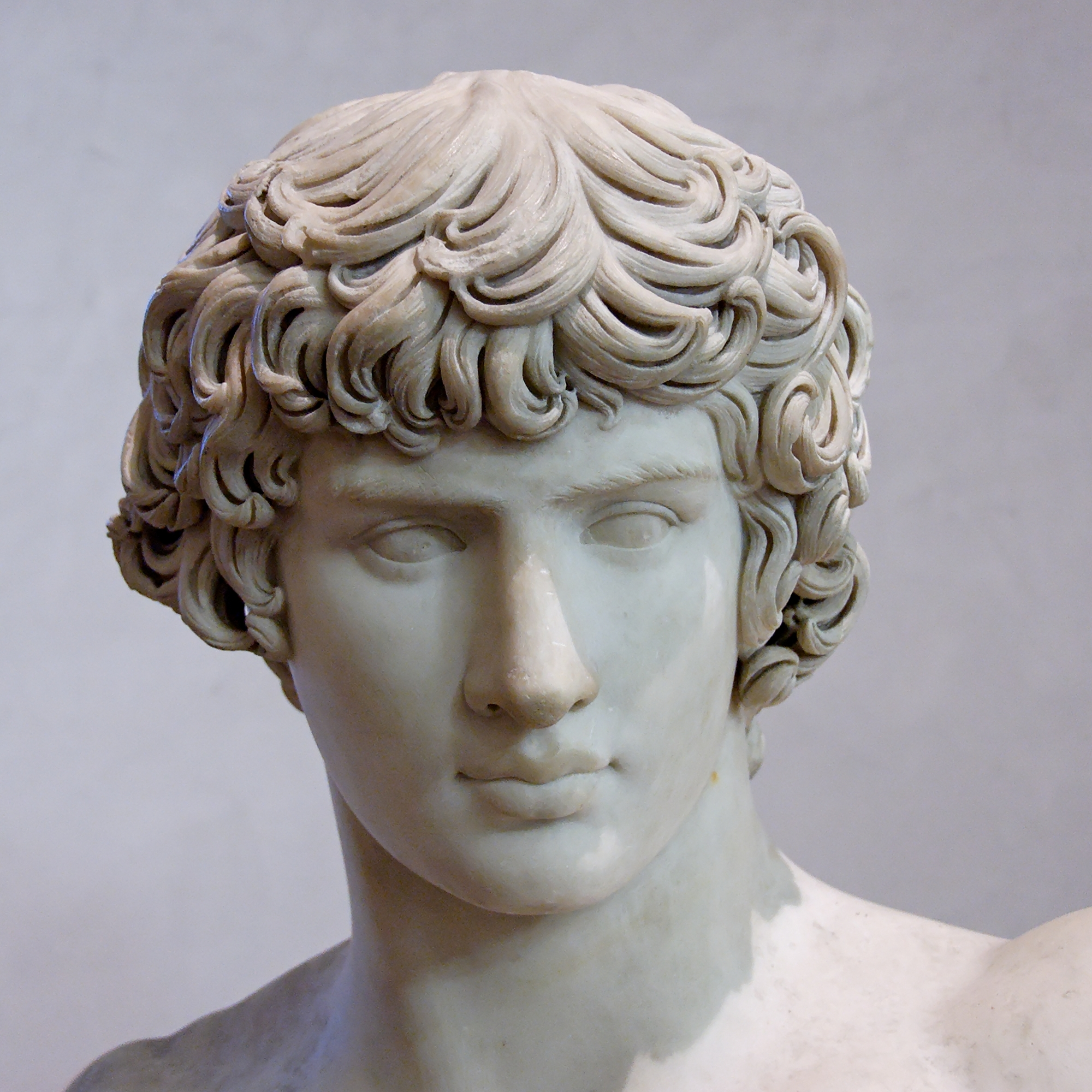
Antinous Ecouen, from Villa Adriana at Tivoli

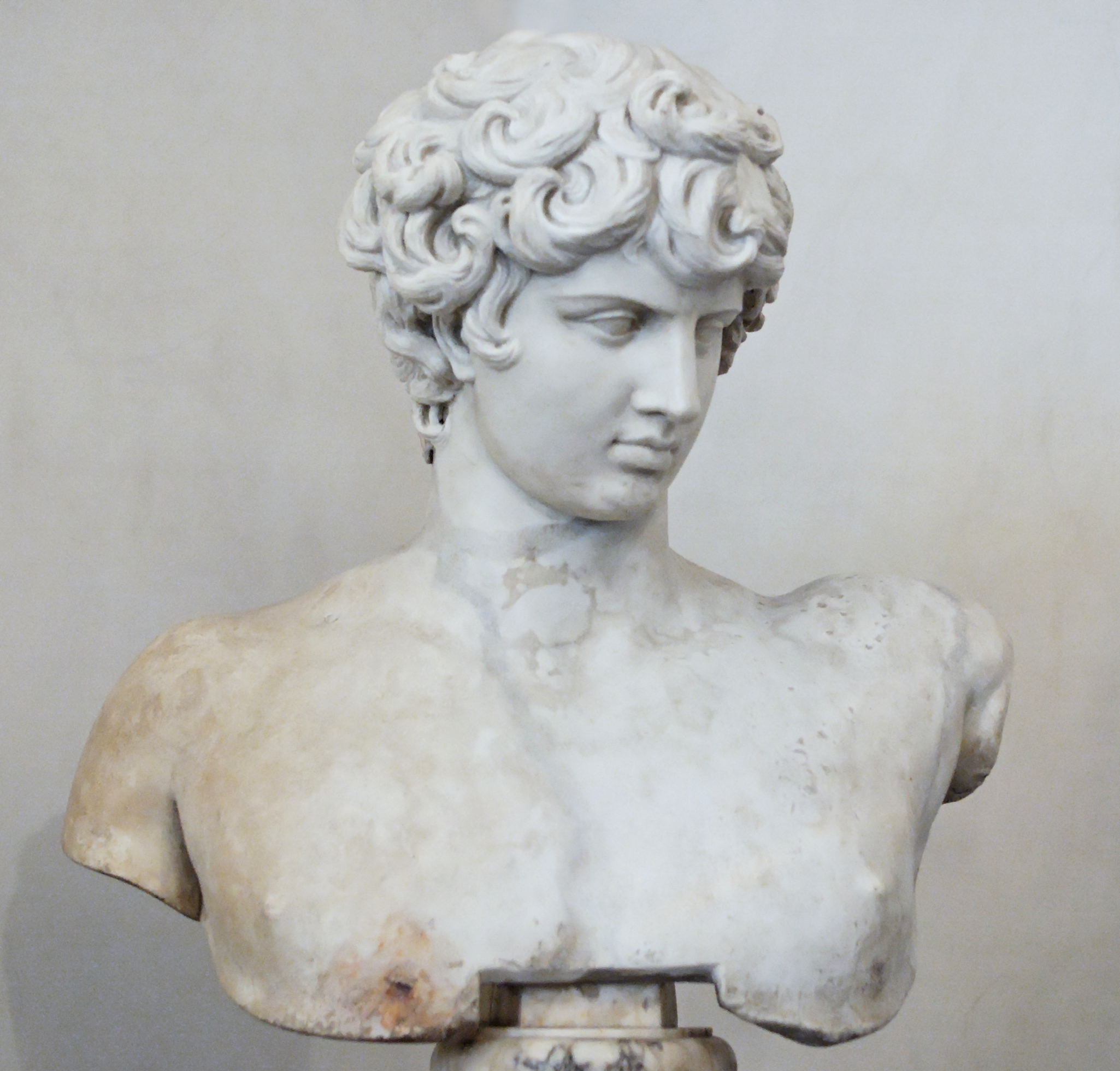
Bust of Antinous in the Palazzo Altemps museum in Rome

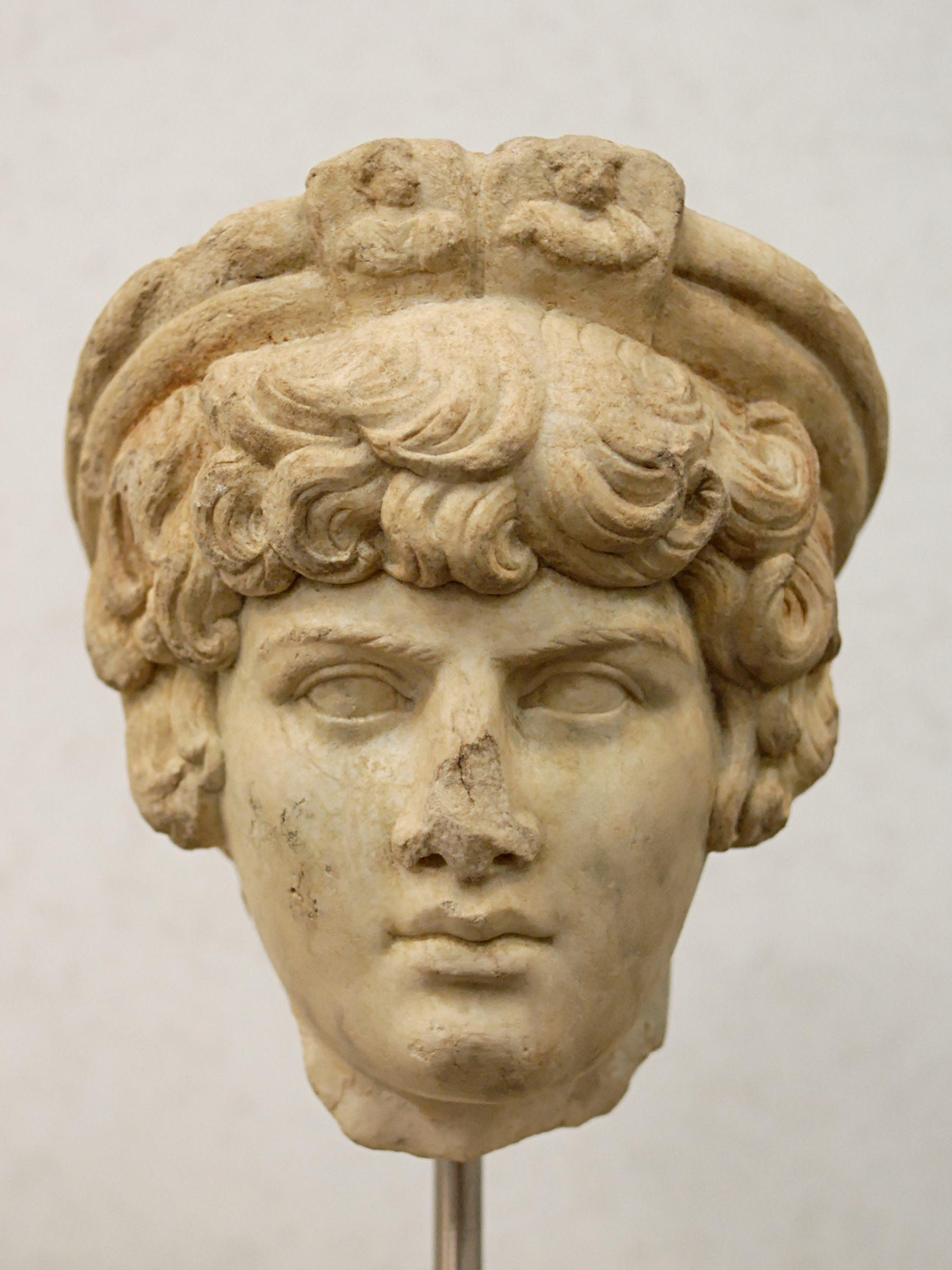
Antinous with a Hellenistic diadem, Palazzo Massimo alle Terme

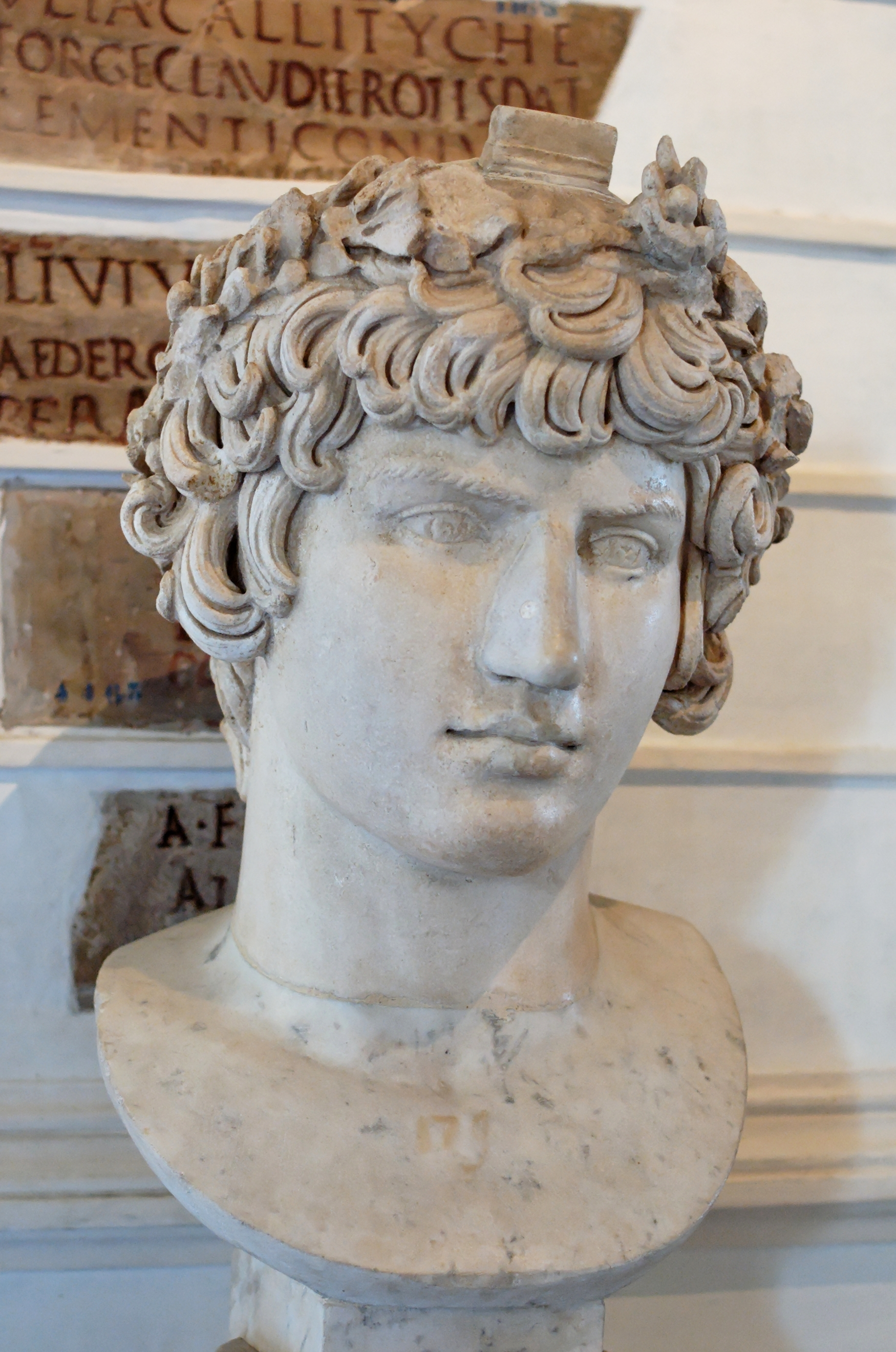
As Bacchus, Capitoline Museums

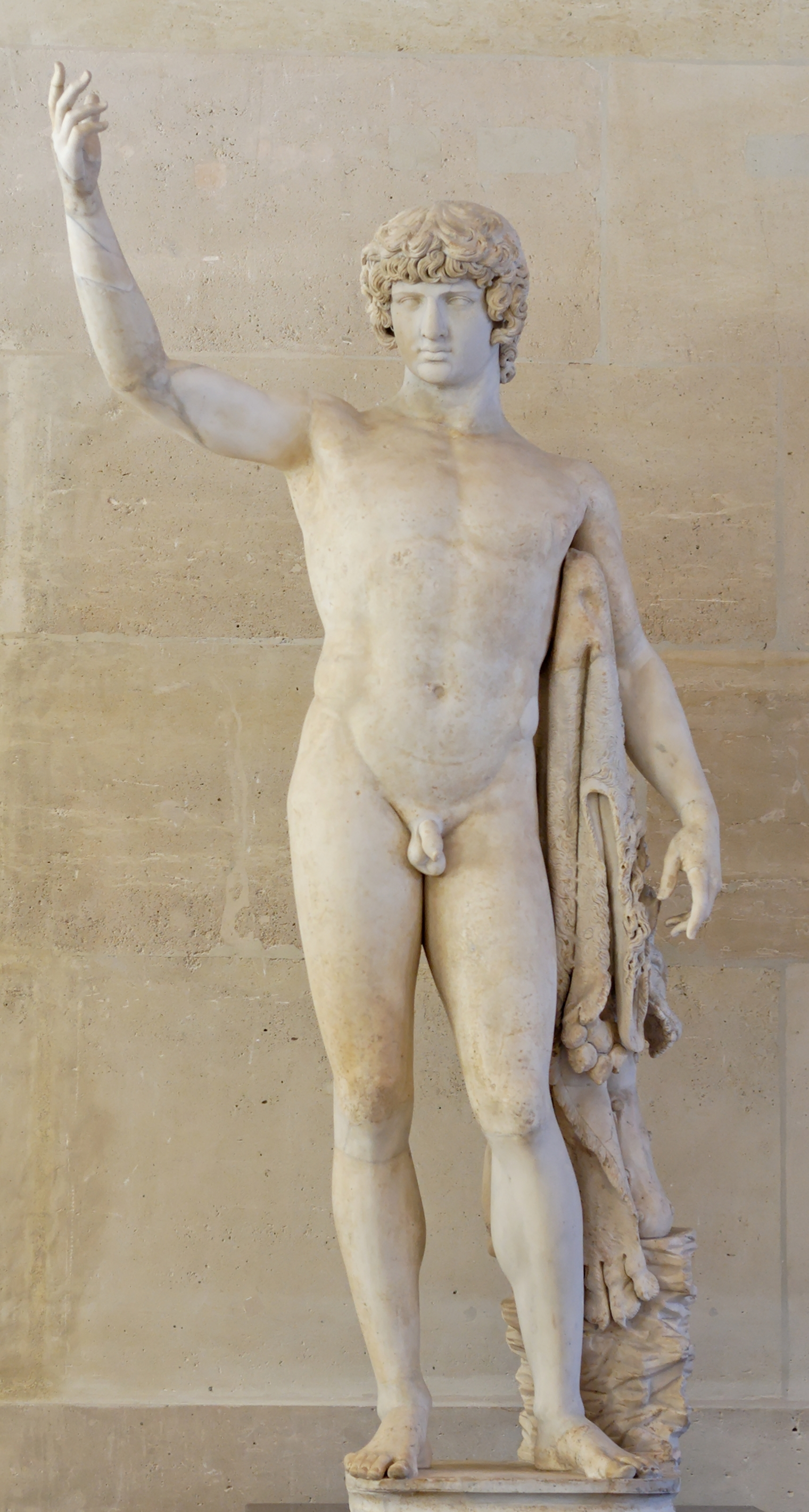
The Antinous Braschi type at the Louvre

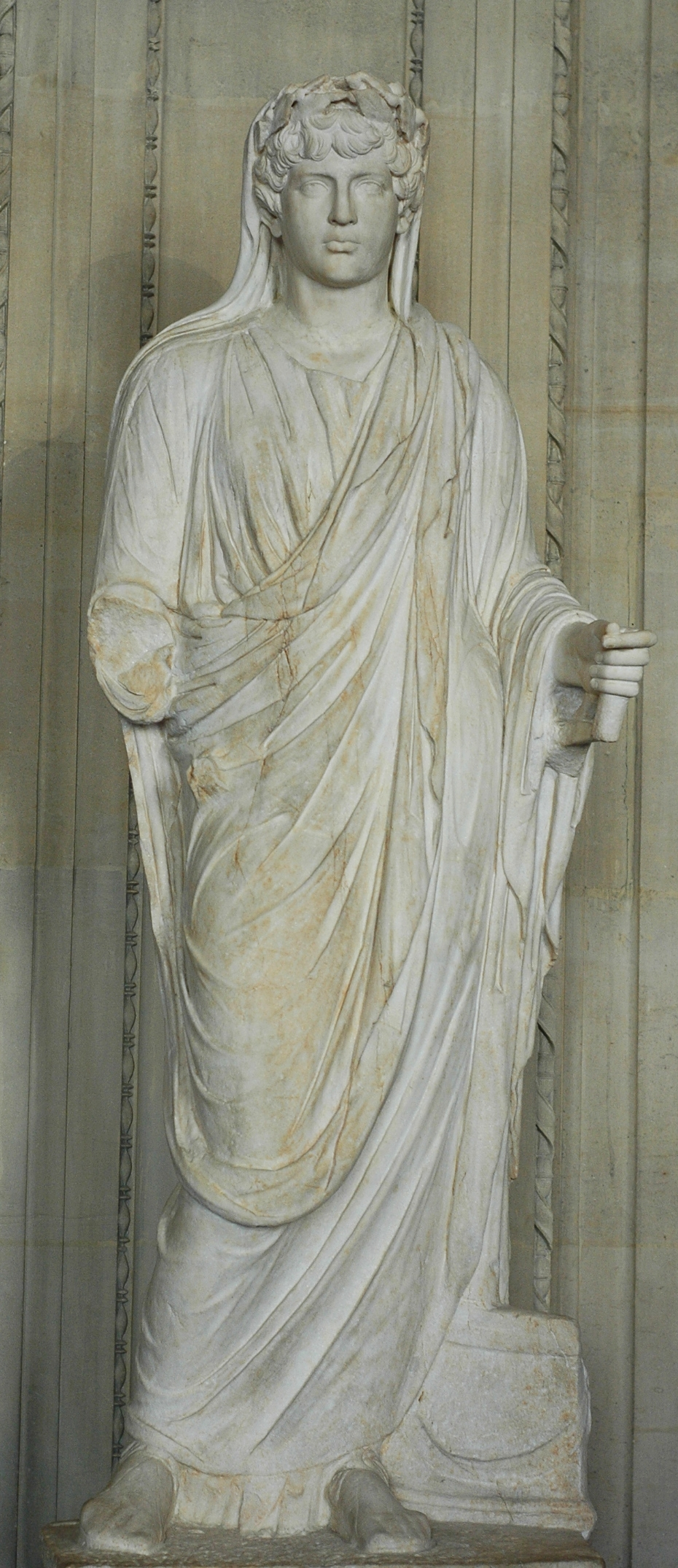
Antinous as a priest of the imperial cult at the Louvre

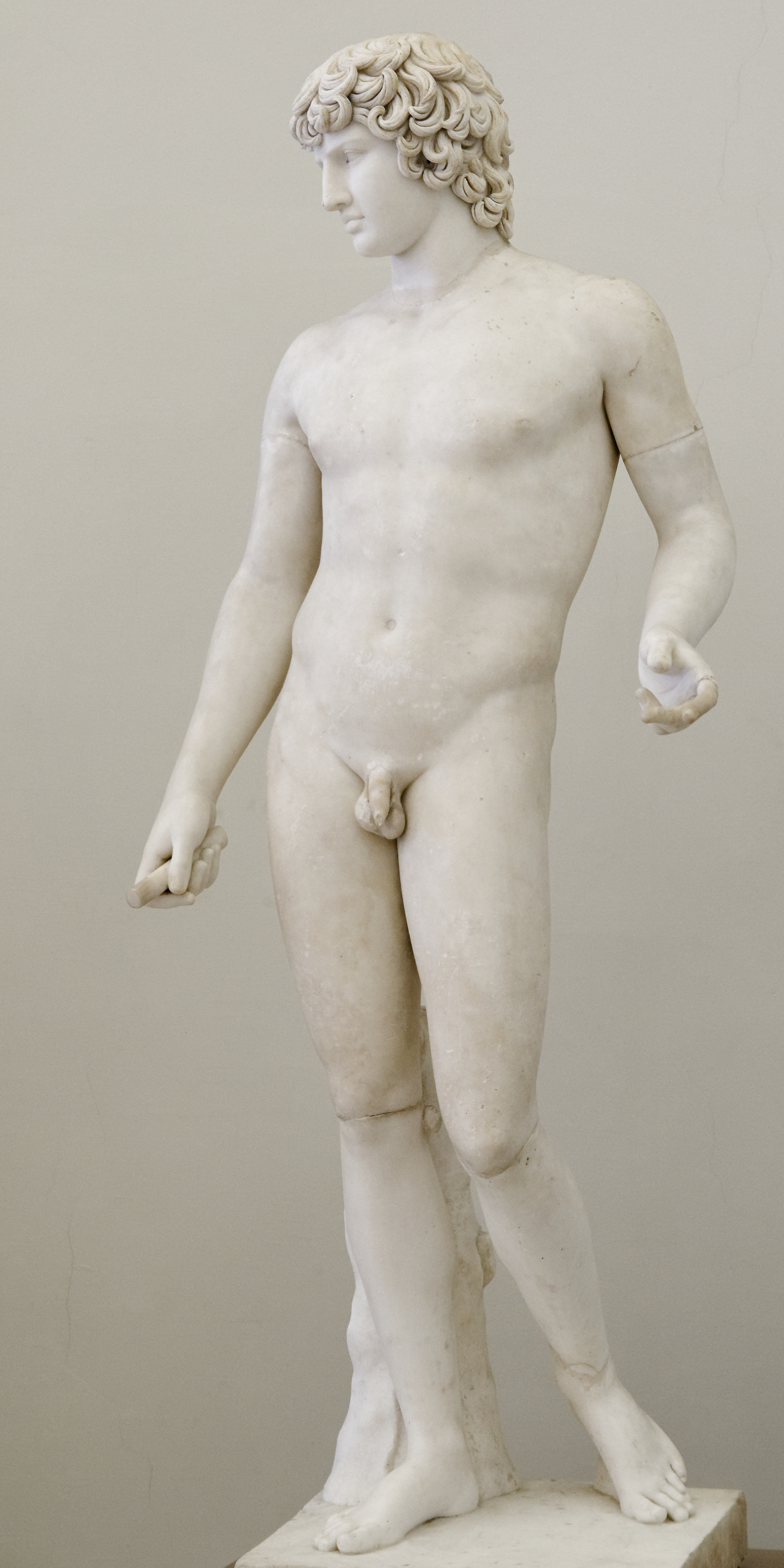
Antinous Farnese, National Archaeological Museum, Naples

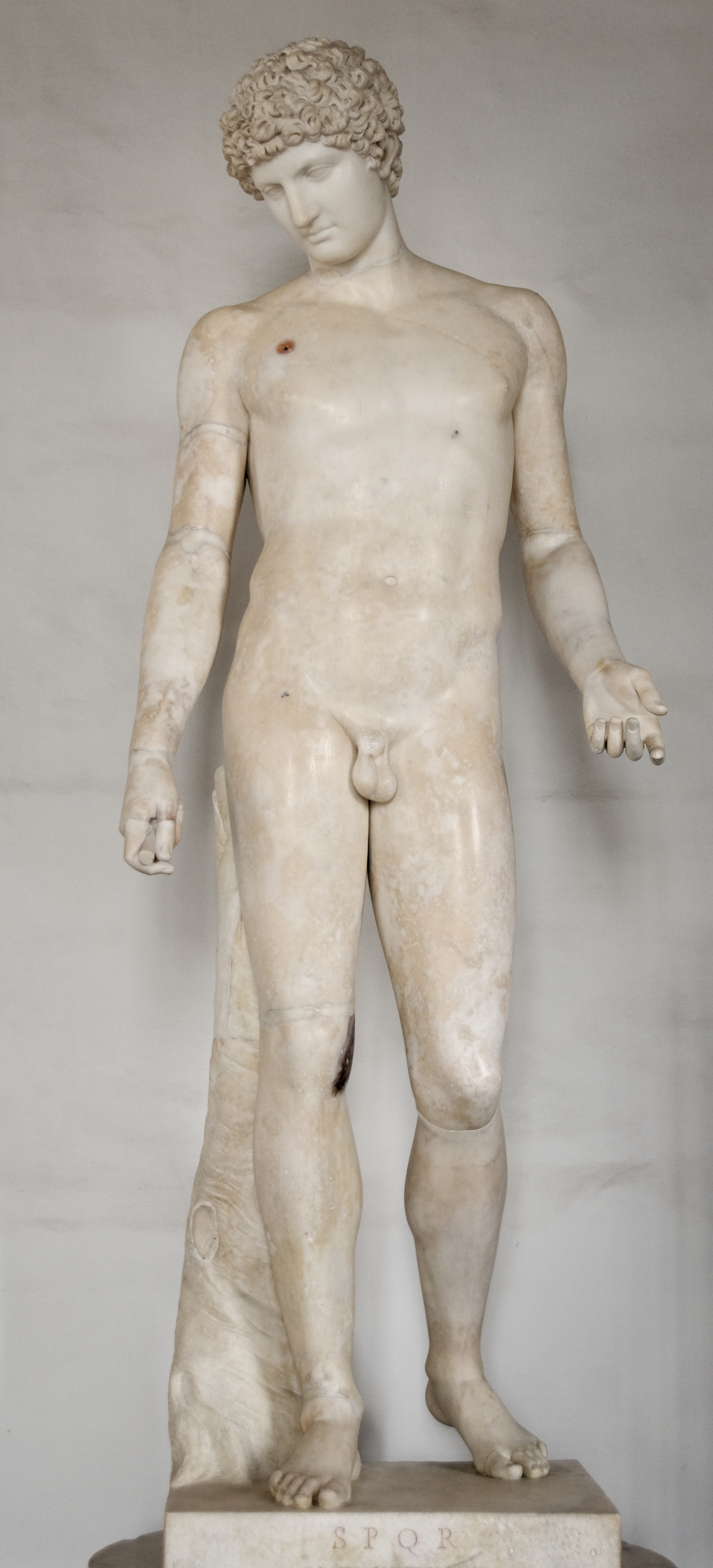
Capitoline Antinous, Capitoline Museums, from the Villa Adriana

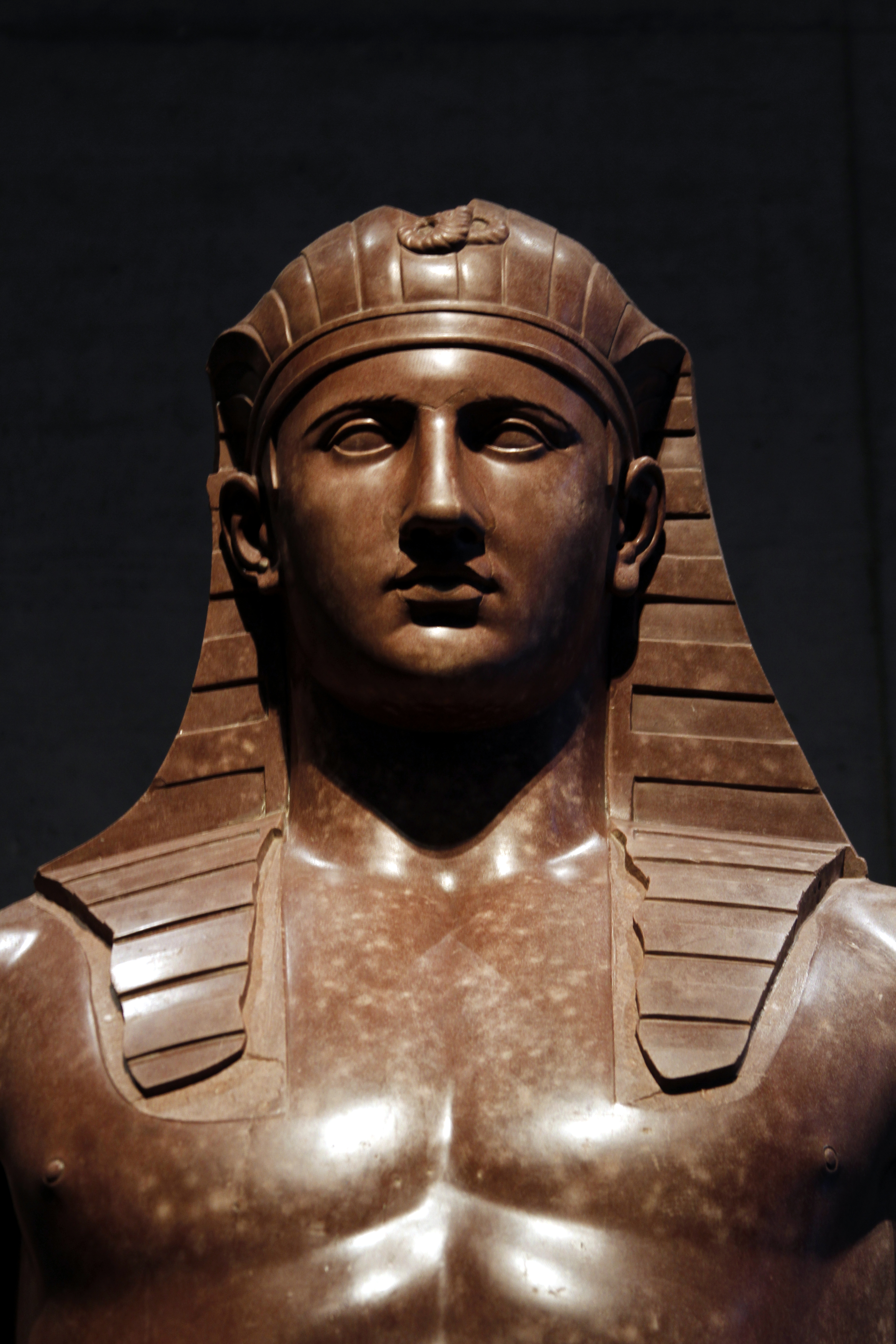
Antinous as Osiris. Staatliches Museum Ägyptischer Kunst

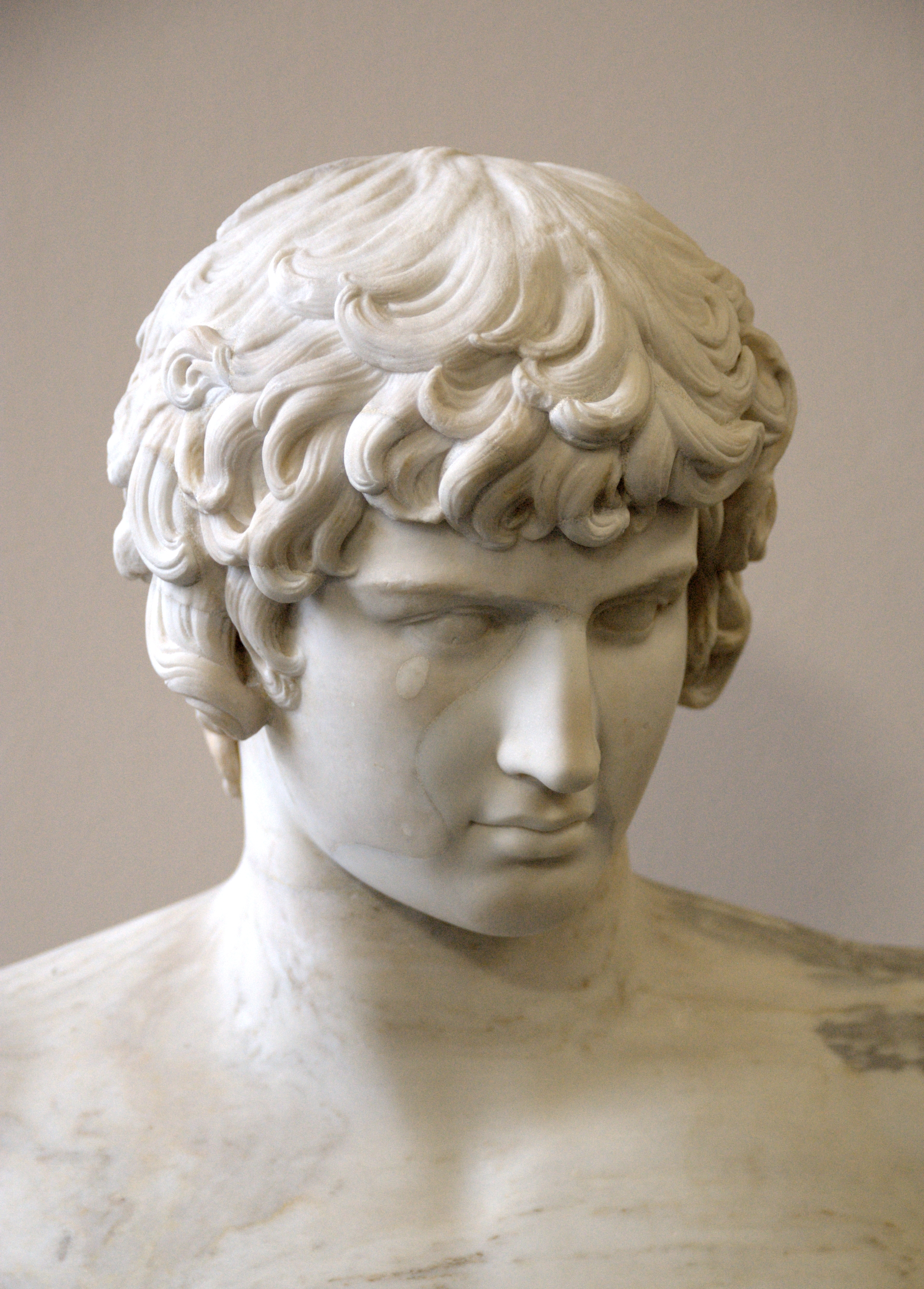
Head (the bust is modern), Antikensammlung Berlin

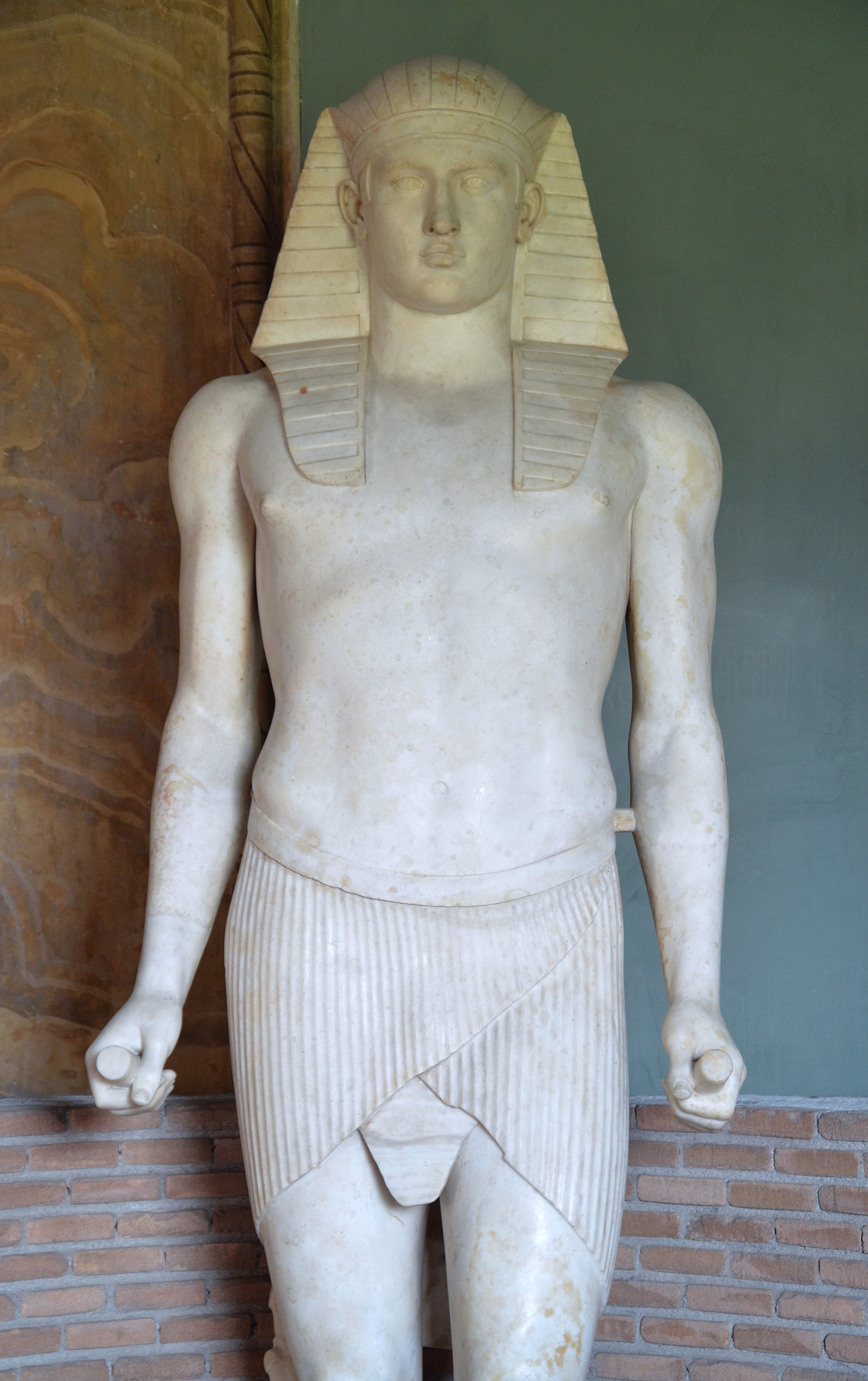
Egyptianising statue of Antinous as Osiris at the Vatican Museums

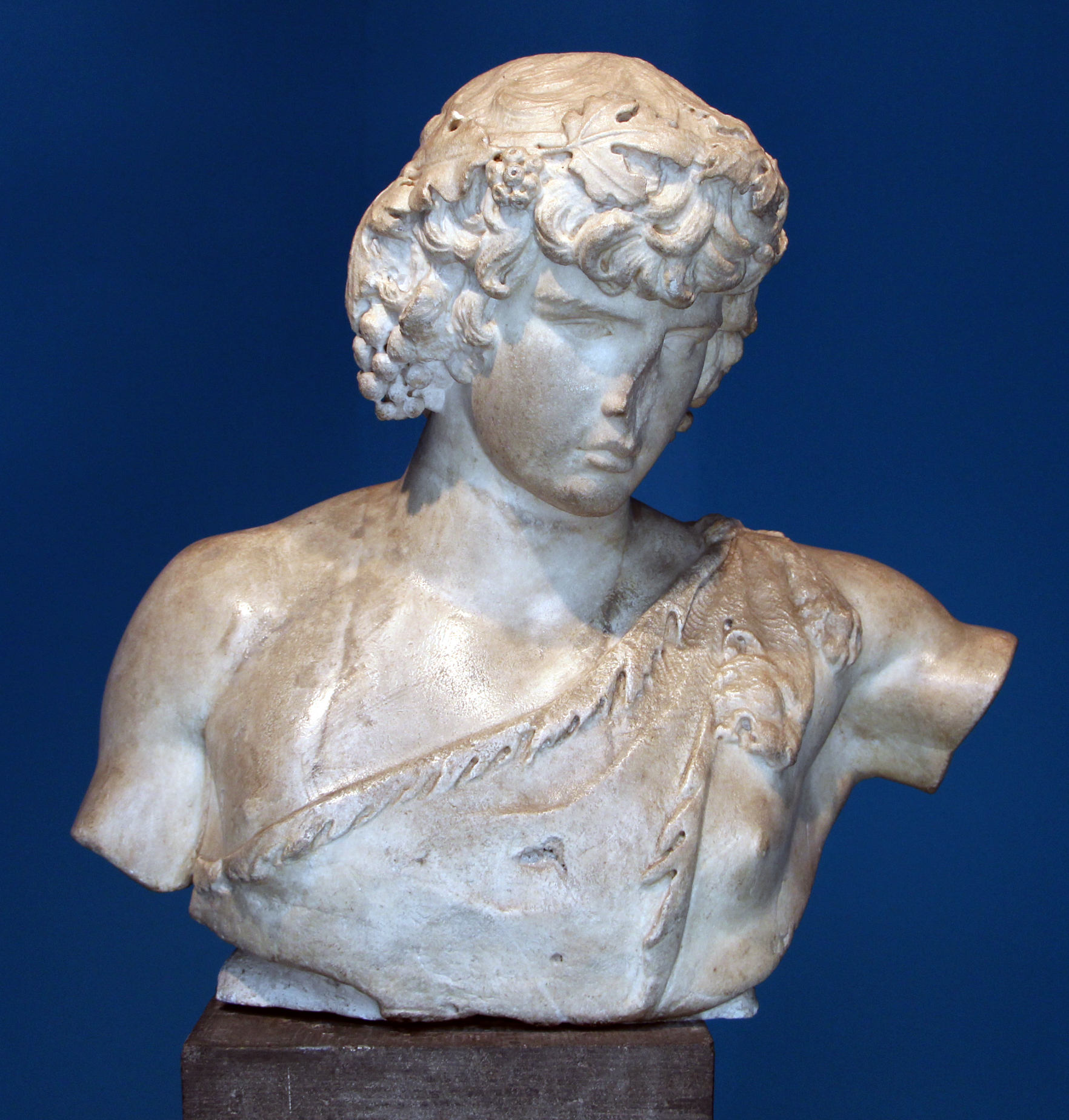
Bust (130–138 AD) in the National Museum of Fine Arts in Rio de Janeiro, Brazil

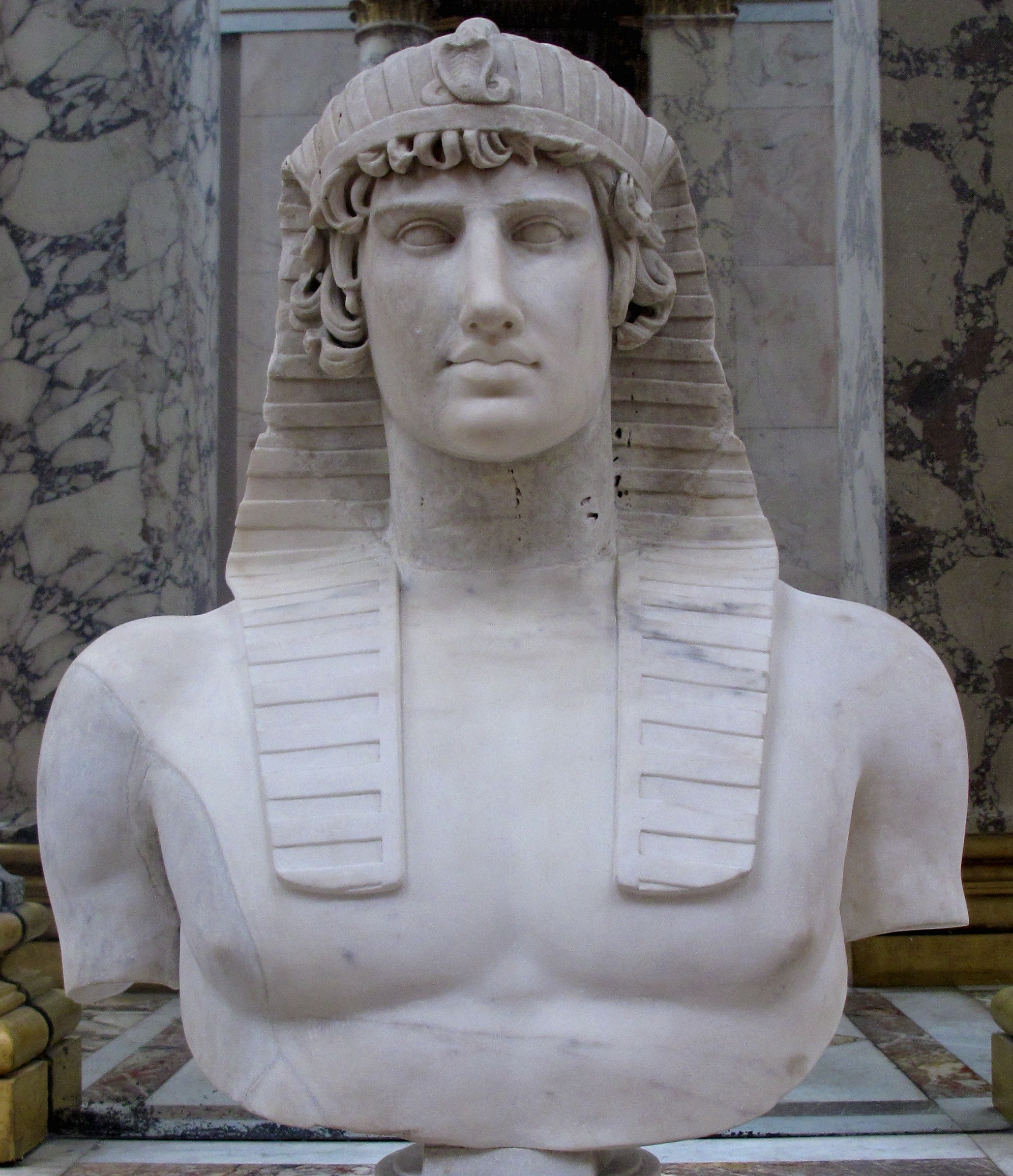
Bust of Antinous-Osiris at the Louvre

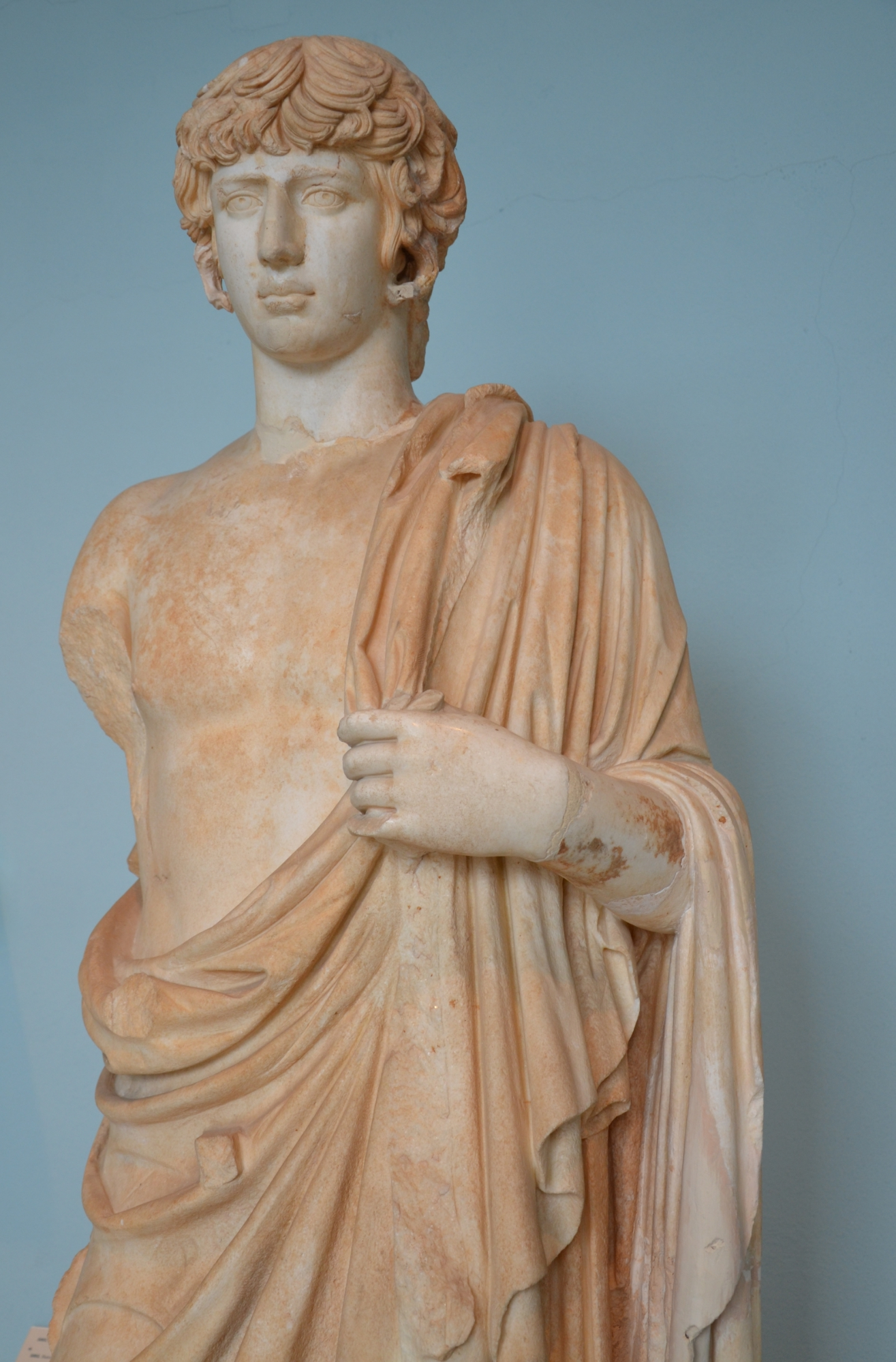
Antinous as Asclepius, Archaeological Museum of Eleusis
- Statue of Antinous (Delphi)
- Townley Antinous
- Antinous-Dionysus (Hermitage)

=== Age ===
The common image of Antinous is of an ephebic teenager which would be of the age of 18 or 19 years old. R. R. R. Smith suggests that the statues of Antinous are concerned with depicting the real age of Antinous at the age of his death, and that this is more likely to be "around thirteen to fourteen". An ephebe of eighteen or nineteen would be depicted with full pubic hair, whereas the statues of Antinous depict him as prepubescent "without pubic hair and with carefully represented soft groin tissue". As for the statues of Antinous portraying his real age, one must remember the statues are artistic representations. If the statues look young, it may only be how the artist envisioned him. Most of the artists never saw Antinous and based their works on sketches and examples. If the statues have no pubic hair, it is just as likely that the artist thought clumps of hair were unattractive and either left them off or painted them in lightly after the sculpting was done as almost all Roman statues were painted.

== Nerva–Antonine family tree ==
Nerva–Antonine family tree

Q. Marcius Barea Soranus	Q. Marcius Barea Sura	Antonia Furnilla	M. Cocceius Nerva	Sergia Plautilla	P. Aelius Hadrianus
Titus (r. 79–81)	Marcia Furnilla	Marcia	Trajanus Pater	Nerva (r. 96–98)	Ulpia (Note: Sister of Trajan's father: Giacosa (1977), p. 7.)	Aelius Hadrianus Marullinus
Flavia (Note: Giacosa (1977), p. 8.)	Marciana (Note: Levick (2014), p. 161.)	C. Salonius Matidius (Note: Husband of Ulpia Marciana: Levick (2014), p. 161.)	Trajan (r. 98–117)	Plotina	P. Acilius Attianus	P. Aelius Afer (Note: Giacosa (1977), p. 7.)	Paulina Major (Note: DIR contributor (Herbert W. Benario, 2000), "Hadrian".)
Lucius Mindius (2)	Libo Rupilius Frugi (3)	Salonia Matidia (Note: Giacosa (1977), p. 9.)	L. Vibius Sabinus (1) (Note: Husband of Salonia Matidia: Levick (2014), p. 161.)
Paulina Minor	L. Julius Ursus Servianus (Note: Smith (1870), "Julius Servianus".)
Matidia Minor	Sabina	Hadrian (Note: Smith (1870), "Hadrian", pp. 319–322.) (r. 117–138)	Antinous (Note: Lover of Hadrian: Lambert (1984), p. 99 and passim; deification: Lambert (1984), pp. 2–5, etc.)
C. Fuscus Salinator I	Julia Serviana Paulina
M. Annius Verus (Note: Husband of Rupilia Faustina: Levick (2014), p. 163.)	Rupilia Faustina (Note: Levick (2014), p. 163.) (Note: It is uncertain whether Rupilia Faustina was Frugi's daughter by Salonia Matidia or another woman.)	Boionia Procilla	Cn. Arrius Antoninus
L. Ceionius Commodus	Appia Severa	C. Fuscus Salinator II
L. Caesennius Paetus	Arria Antonina	Arria Fadilla (Note: Levick (2014), p. 162.)	T. Aurelius Fulvus
L. Caesennius Antoninus	L. Commodus	Plautia	unknown (Note: Levick (2014), p. 164.)	C. Avidius Nigrinus
M. Annius Verus	Calvisia Domitia Lucilla (Note: Wife of M. Annius Verus: Giacosa (1977), p. 10.)	Fundania (Note: Wife of M. Annius Libo: Levick (2014), p. 163.)	M. Annius Libo	Faustina	Antoninus Pius (r. 138–161)	L. Aelius Caesar	Avidia
Cornificia	Marcus Aurelius (r. 161–180) (Note: Giacosa (1977), p. 10.)	Faustina Minor	Aurelia Fadilla	Lucius Verus (r. 161–169) (1)	Ceionia Fabia	Plautius Quintillus (Note: Husband of Ceionia Fabia: Levick (2014), p. 164.)	Q. Servilius Pudens	Ceionia Plautia
Cornificia Minor (Note: Levick (2014), p. 117.)	M. Petronius Sura	Commodus (r. 177–192)	Fadilla	M. Annius Verus Caesar	Ti. Claudius Pompeianus (2)	Lucilla	M. Plautius Quintillus	Junius Licinius Balbus	Servilia Ceionia
Petronius Antoninus	L. Aurelius Agaclytus (2)	Aurelia Sabina	L. Antistius Burrus (1)	Plautius Quintillus	Plautia Servilla	C. Furius Sabinus Timesitheus	Maecia Faustina	Junius Licinius Balbus?
Furia Sabinia Tranquillina	Gordian III (r. 238–244)

- (1) = 1st spouse
- (2) = 2nd spouse
- (3) = 3rd spouse
- Reddish-purple indicates emperor of the Nerva–Antonine dynasty
  lighter purple indicates designated imperial heir of said dynasty who never reigned
  grey indicates unsuccessful imperial aspirants
  bluish-purple indicates emperors of other dynasties
- dashed lines indicate adoption; dotted lines indicate love affairs/unmarried relationships
- Small Caps = posthumously deified (Augusti, Augustae, or other)

Notes:

Except where otherwise noted, the notes below indicate that an individual's parentage is as shown in the above family tree.

References:
- DIR contributors (2000). "De Imperatoribus Romanis: An Online Encyclopedia of Roman Rulers and Their Families".
- Giacosa, Giorgio (1977). Women of the Caesars: Their Lives and Portraits on Coins. Translated by Holloway, R. Ross. Milan: Edizioni Arte e Moneta. ISBN 0-8390-0193-2.
- Lambert, Royston (1984). Beloved and God: The Story of Hadrian and Antinous. New York: Viking. ISBN 0-670-15708-2.
- Levick, Barbara (2014). Faustina I and II: Imperial Women of the Golden Age. Oxford University Press. ISBN 978-0-19-537941-9.
- Smith, William, ed. (1870). Dictionary of Greek and Roman Biography and Mythology.

== Cultural references ==
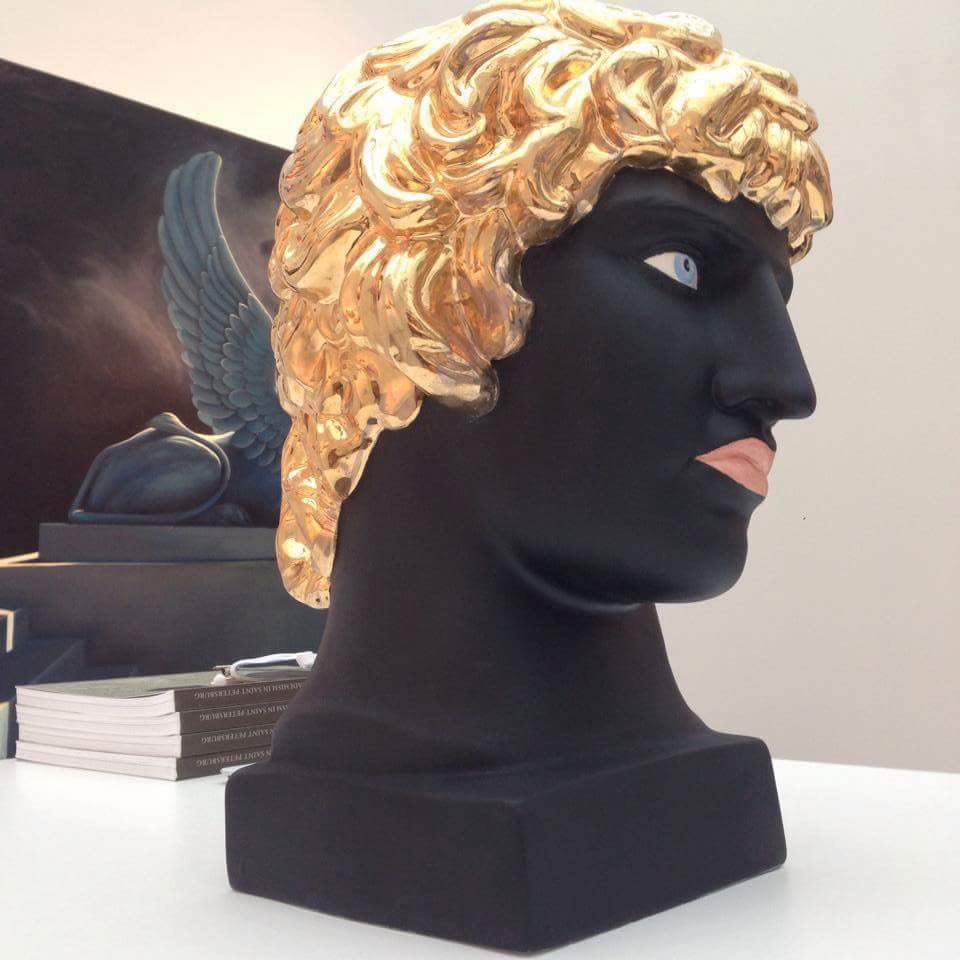
Antinous II, 2005, Olga Tobreluts

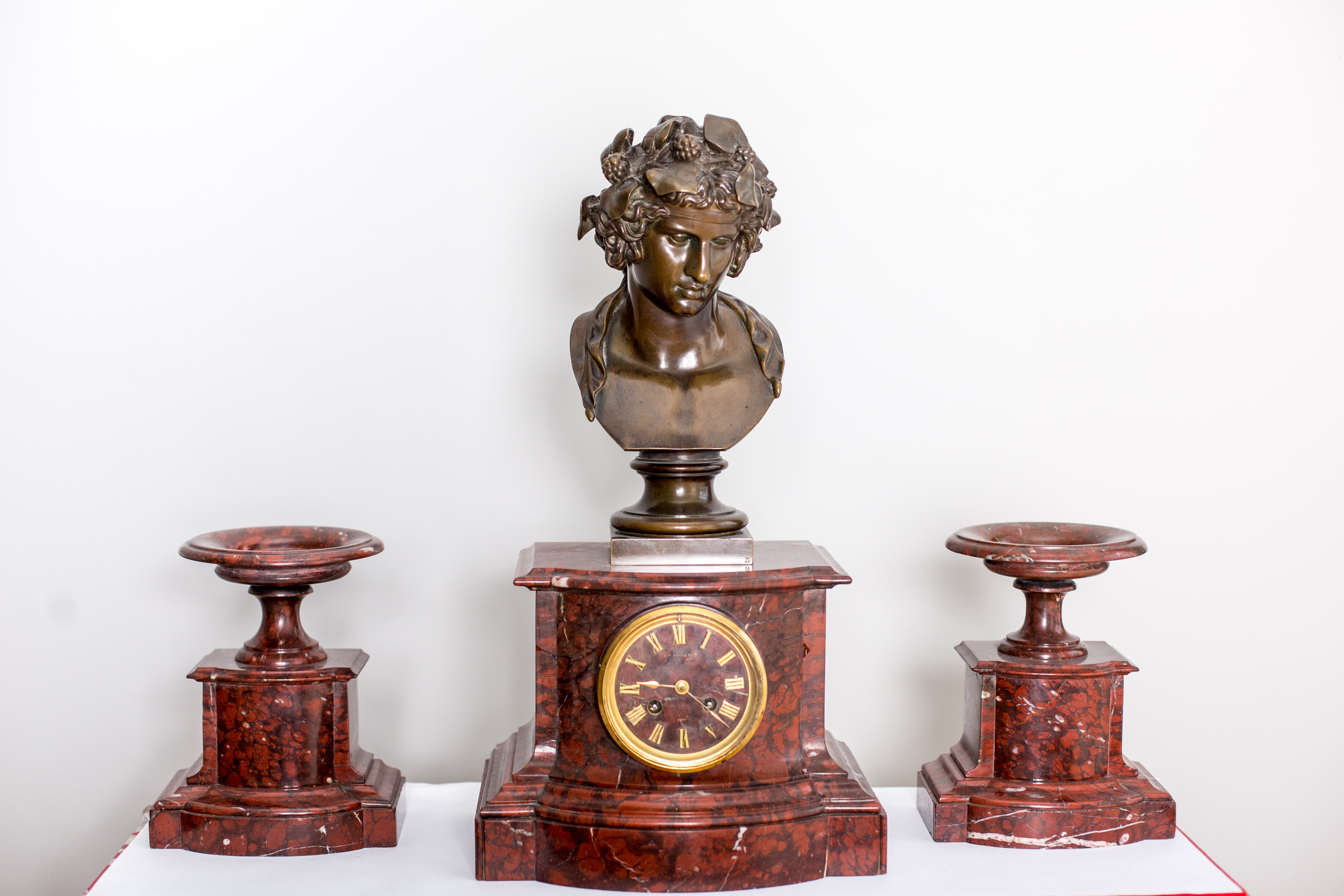
Antinous altar clock. 19th century. Queer Museum in Exile

Antinous remained a figure of cultural significance for centuries to come; as Vout noted, he was "arguably the most notorious pretty boy from the annals of classical history." Sculptures of Antinous began to be reproduced from the 16th century; it remains likely that some of these modern examples have subsequently been sold as Classical artefacts and are still viewed as such.

Antinous has attracted attention from the homosexual subculture since the 18th century, the most illustrious examples for this being Prince Eugene of Savoy and Frederick the Great of Prussia. Vout noted that Antinous came to be identified as "a gay icon." Novelist and independent scholar Sarah Waters identified Antinous as being "at the forefront of the homosexual imagination" in late 19th-century Europe. In this, Antinous replaced the figure of Ganymede, who had been the primary homoerotic representation in the visual arts during the Renaissance. Gay author Karl Heinrich Ulrichs celebrated Antinous in an 1865 pamphlet that he wrote under the pseudonym of "Numa Numantius." In 1893, homophile newspaper The Artist, began offering cast statues of Antinous for £3 10s. At the time, Antinous's fame was increased by the work of fiction and writers and scholars, many of whom were not homosexuals.

The author Oscar Wilde referenced Antinous in both "The Young King" (1891) and "The Sphinx" (1894). In "The Young King", a reference is made to the king kissing a statue of 'the Bithynian slave of Hadrian' in a passage describing the young king's aesthetic sensibilities and his "...strange passion for beauty...". Images of other classical paragons of male beauty, Adonis and Endymion, are also mentioned in the same context. Additionally, in Wilde's The Picture of Dorian Gray, the artist Basil Hallward describes the appearance of Dorian Gray as an event as important to his art as "the face of Antinous was to late Greek sculpture." Furthermore, in a novel attributed to Oscar Wilde, Teleny, or The Reverse of the Medal, Des Grieux makes a passing reference to Antinous as he describes how he felt during a musical performance: "I now began to understand things hitherto so strange, the love the mighty monarch felt for his fair Grecian slave, Antinous, who—like unto Christ—died for his master's sake."

In Les Misérables, the character Enjolras is likened to Antinous. "A charming young man who was capable of being a terror. He was angelically good-looking, an untamed Antinous." Hugo also remarks that Enjolras was "seeming not to be aware of the existence on earth of a creature called woman."

In "Klage um Antinous", Der neuen Gedichte anderer Teil (1908) by Rainer Maria Rilke, Hadrian scolds the gods for Antinous's deification. "Lament for Antinoüs", translation by Stephen Cohn.

In 1915 Fernando Pessoa wrote a long poem entitled Antinous, but he only published it in 1918, close to the end of World War I, in a slim volume of English verse.

In Marguerite Yourcenar's Mémoires d'Hadrien (1951), the romantic relationship between Antinous and Hadrian is one of the main themes of the book.

In Aldous Huxley's utopian novel "Island" (1963), the youthful character Murugan is likened to Antinous because of his relationship with dictatorial leader, Colonel Dipa. While on a trip to Rendang to pick up his mother, Murugan also secretly saw Dipa but did not want the island people of Pala to know because "they think he's awful." After Murugan called Dipa a "remarkable man," Huxley wrote that "Murugan's sulky face lit up with enthusiasm and there, suddenly, was Antinous in all the fascinating beauty of ambiguous adolescence," and later, "Will felt quite sure, he hadn't been mistaken when he thought of Hadrian and Antinous" while speaking to Murugan.

The story of Antinous's death was dramatised in the radio play "The Glass Ball Game", episode two of the second series of the BBC radio drama Caesar!, written by Mike Walker, directed by Jeremy Mortimer and starring Jonathan Coy as "Suetonius", Jonathan Hyde as "Hadrian" and Andrew Garfield as "Antinous." In this story, Suetonius is a witness to the events before and after Antinous's death by suicide, but learns that he himself was used as an instrument to trick Antinous into killing himself willingly to fulfil a pact made by Hadrian with Egyptian priests to give Hadrian more time to live so that Marcus Aurelius may grow up to become the next Emperor.

On 13 October 2018, in Toronto, the Canadian Opera Company premiered Hadrian, the second opera by Rufus Wainwright, which tells the tale of the Emperor's grief and his all-consuming need to discover the details surrounding Antinous's death.

In June 2023, Hadrian and Antinous were the subject of the podcast The Rest is History by Tom Holland and Dominic Sandbrook.

== Historiography ==
The classicist Caroline Vout noted that most of the texts dealing with Antinous's biography only dealt with him briefly and were post-Hadrianic in date, thus commenting that "reconstructing a detailed biography is impossible." The historian Thorsten Opper of the British Museum noted that "Hardly anything is known of Antinous's life, and the fact that our sources get more detailed the later they are does not inspire confidence." Antinous's biographer Royston Lambert echoed this view, commenting that information on him was "tainted always by distance, sometimes by prejudice and by the alarming and bizarre ways in which the principal sources have been transmitted to us."

== See also ==
- Antinous (constellation)
