= Antinous-Dionysus (Hermitage) =

Roman marble sculptural portrait

Bust of Antinous-Dionysus
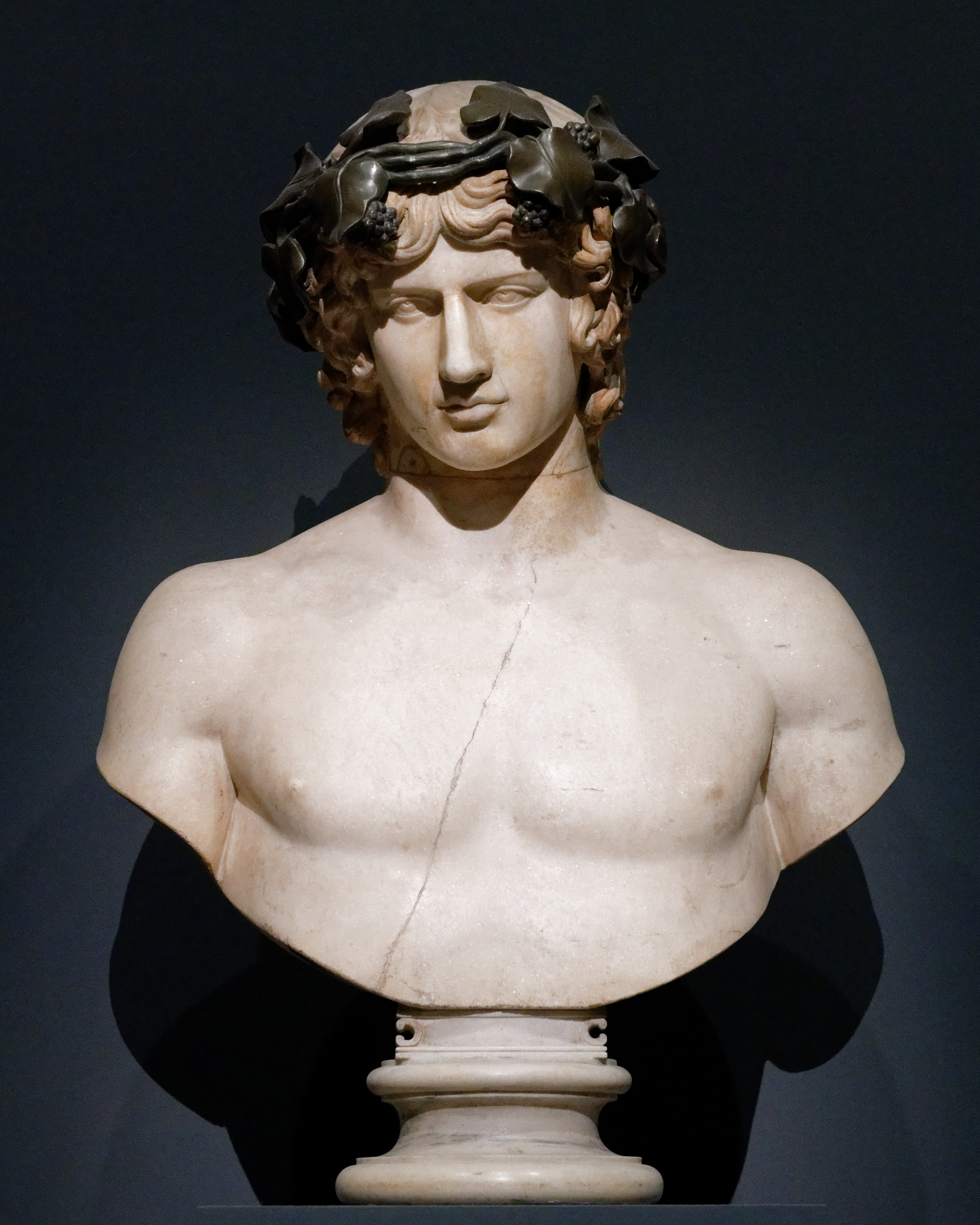
- Year: 2nd century AD.
- Medium: Marble sculpture
- Dimensions: 84 cm (33 in)
- Location: Hermitage, Saint Petersburg

The Bust of Antinous-Dionysus in the Hermitage is an ancient Roman colossal marble sculptural portrait of Antinous, the favorite and beloved of the Roman emperor Hadrian. He is depicted as the god Dionysus with a bronze vine wreath on his head. The bust is believed to have been found at Hadrian's Villa in Tivoli. It was in the collection of the Marquis Giampietro Campana and was known as one of his finest sculptures. After the ruin of the marquis, the bust of Antinous-Dionysus was acquired in 1861 by Emperor Alexander II of Russia for the Hermitage.

Under the Soviet Union, when homosexuality was considered a criminal offense, the underground gay community in Leningrad had a custom of taking oaths of allegiance and playing impromptu weddings in front of this statue.
