= Caroline Vout =

British classicist and art historian (born c.1972)

- Born: c. 1972 (age c. 54); Durham, England, United Kingdom
- Education: University of Cambridge
- Occupation: Academic
- Website: http://www.classics.cam.ac.uk/directory/caroline-vout

Caroline Vout FSA (born c. 1972) is a British classicist and art historian. As of 2019 she is a Professor in classics at the University of Cambridge and a fellow of Christ's College. In 2021 she became Director of the Museum of Classical Archaeology, Cambridge.

== Career ==
Vout was born in Durham. She read Classics at Newnham College, Cambridge, graduating in 1995, before taking a master's degree in Roman and Byzantine Art at the Courtauld Institute. She then returned to Cambridge for her doctorate, which was supervised by Keith Hopkins and Mary Beard.

Upon finishing her doctorate she lectured at the Universities of Bristol and Nottingham until being appointed to as a fellow of Christ's College in 2006.

She curated an exhibition on Antinous at the Henry Moore Institute in Leeds and is on the academic advisory panel for the department of Greek and Roman antiquities at the Fitzwilliam Museum. She has written for The Times Literary Supplement and The Guardian, and appeared on the 2011 BBC Four documentary Fig Leaf: The Biggest Cover-Up In History and on BBC Radio 4's In Our Time.

== Books ==
- Antinous: the Face of the Antique. Leeds: Henry Moore Sculpture Trust, 2006.
- Power and Eroticism in Imperial Rome. Cambridge: Cambridge University Press, 2007.
- The Hills of Rome: Signature of an Eternal City. Cambridge: Cambridge University Press, 2012
- Sex on Show: Seeing the Erotic in Greece and Rome. London: British Museum Press, 2013
- Epic Visions: Visuality in Greek and Latin Epic and its Reception. (co-edited with Helen Lovatt). Cambridge: Cambridge University Press
- Classical Art: A Life History from Antiquity to the Present. Princeton: Princeton University Press, 2018.
- Exposed: the Greek and Roman Body. London: Profile Books, 2022.

== Awards ==
- The Art Book Award (awarded by the Association of Art Historians) for Antinous; 2008. (Not available online to non-members.)
- Philip Leverhulme Prize, 2008
- Fellow, Society of Antiquaries of London
