= Discus Thrower (Washington, D.C.) =

Bronze sculpture in Washington, D.C.

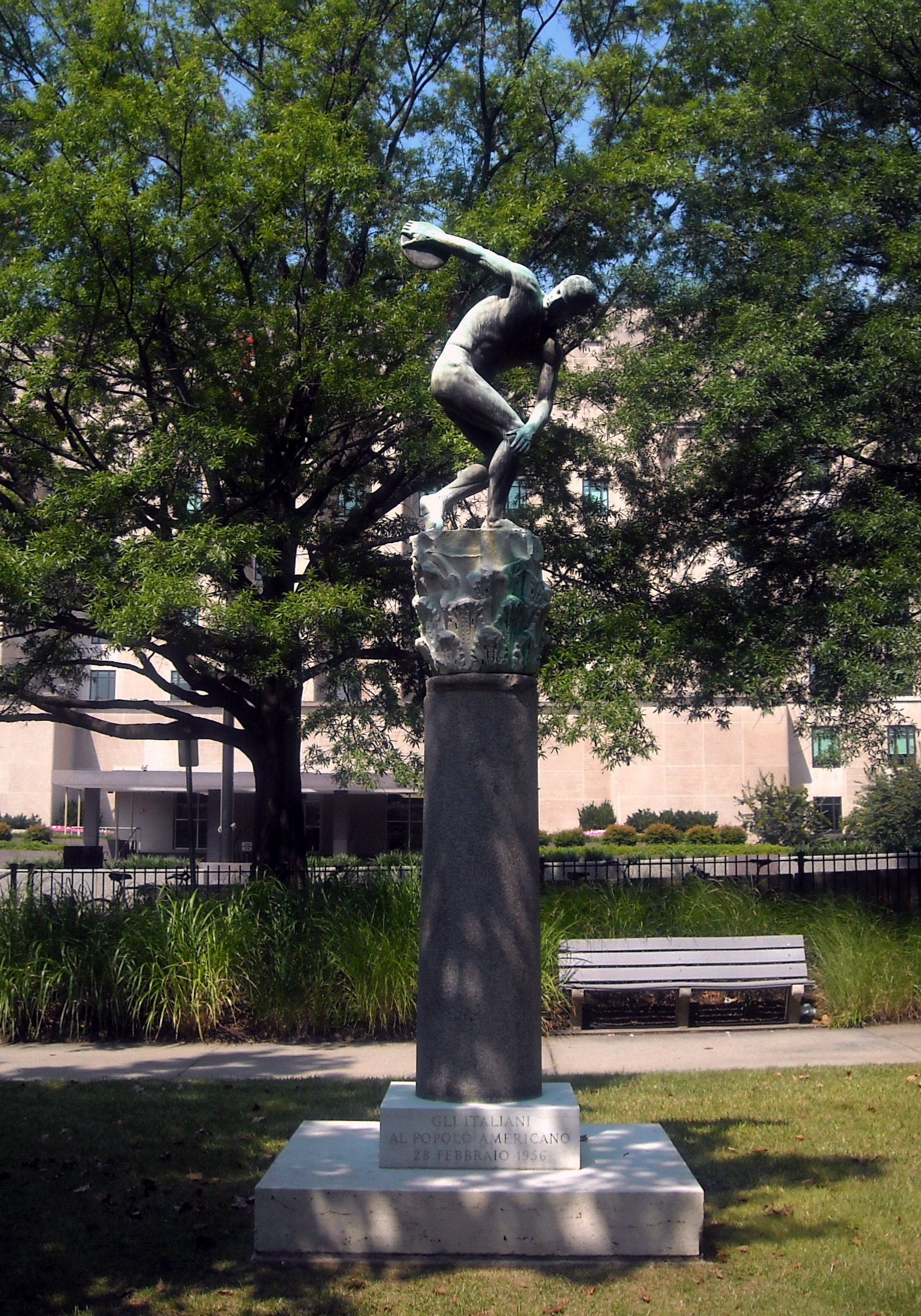
- Sculpture in 2009
- Year: 1956
- Type: Bronze
- Location: Washington, D.C., United States; 38.894869°N 77.046411°W
- Owner: National Park Service

Discus Thrower is a bronze sculpture in Washington, D.C. A copy of Myron's Discobolus, it is located in Edward J. Kelly Park, at 21st Street and Virginia Avenue, N.W. Washington, D.C. The architect was Rodolfo Siviero, and the founder was Bruno Bearzi.

It was dedicated on March 1, 1956. It was a gift from the Italian government to commemorate the return of looted art objects after World War II.

The inscription reads:
(Base of sculpture, east side:)
GLI ITALIANI [THE ITALIANS]
AL POPOLO AMERICANO [TO THE AMERICAN PEOPLE]
28 FEBBRAIO 1956 [February 28, 1956]
(Base of sculpture, west side:)
SIGNVM IVSTITIAE RESTITVTAE [SYMBOL OF RESTORED JUSTICE]
XXVIII.II.MCMXLVIII [28.2.1948]

The statue thus commemorates the February 28, 1948 action of the US military government in Germany approving the repatriation of a large trove of artifacts looted by Nazi Germany.

== See also ==
- Discobolus (Harvard University)
- List of public art in Washington, D.C., Ward 2
