= The Victorious Athlete =

Painting by Francesco Hayez

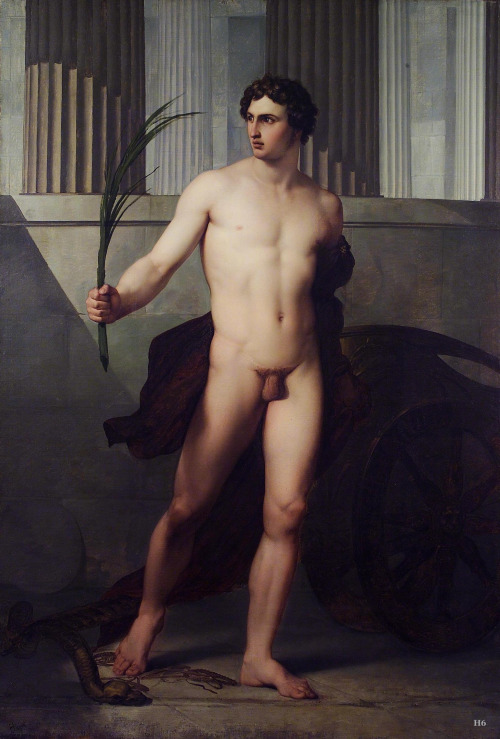
- Artist: Francesco Hayez
- Year: 1813
- Medium: oil on canvas
- Dimensions: 225 cm × 152 cm (89 in × 60 in)
- Location: Accademia di San Luca; Rome

The Victorious Athlete or The Triumphant Athlete (Italian - Atleta trionfante) is an oil-on-canvas painting by the Italian artist Francesco Hayez, from 1813. It is held in the Accademia di San Luca, in Rome.

== History and description ==
It was produced a year after the painter's victory ex aequo in a competition organised by the Accademia milanese di Brera. It was one of the artist's first works to receive public acclaim and won the Mecenate Anonimo competition set up by Antonio Canova, which required competitors to produce "a life-size painting of a nude". The work shows a nude man with no surrounding figures, thus directly competing with sculptures by Hellenistic artists such as the Apollo Belvedere and works by Canova himself.

The subject holds a palm branch of victory just after descending in triumph from a chariot, which is shown in the background below a number of fluted Doric columns. An abandoned discus at bottom left suggests he is a discobolus. He turns his head to the left side of the work whilst walking towards its right, showing his flexible body covered in chiaroscuro and with his pink flesh tones set off by a brown robe billowing behind him.

Though its subject is unathletic in build, the work was a brilliant success thanks to its composition's "beautiful surrender of movement" and its "very fresh" execution, so much so that consul Tambroni said "there are many young students in Rome, of whom we have high hopes, and first among them is the Venetian Hayez".
