= Edward J. Kelly Park =

Park in Washington, D.C., U.S.

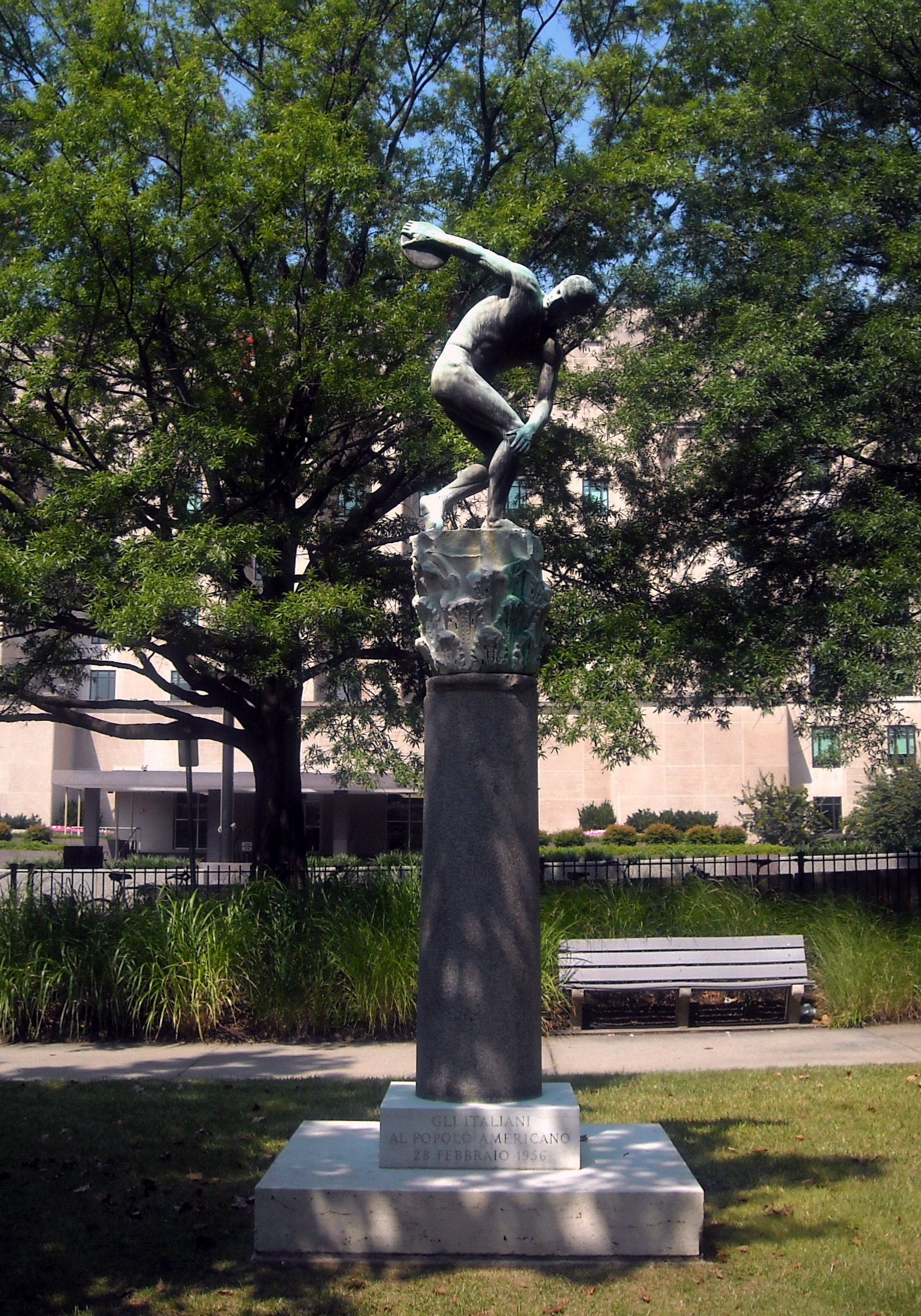
- Discus Thrower statue in the park, 2009

- Location within Central Washington, D.C. Location within the United States
- Location: Washington, D.C.
- Coordinates: 38°53′41″N 77°02′46″W

Edward J. Kelly Park is a park located in the Foggy Bottom neighborhood of Washington, D.C. The park is located at the southeast corner of Virginia Avenue and 21st Street NW.

== History ==
On January 17, 1959, Secretary of the Interior Fred A. Seaton named the park after Edward J. Kelly, former superintendent of National Capital Parks. Kelly had died on December 9, 1958.

Since the mid-1970s, the Federal Reserve maintains a public tennis court in the park, and frequent patrols of the park are conducted by the Federal Reserve Police.

In April 2011, without a continuing budget passed by Congress, 800,000 federal employees seemed to be soon on unpaid furlough during an imminent shutdown. A group of federal employees, many from the Department of State and the U.S. Agency for International Development, gathered at a rally to protest the imminent furloughs. The rally was organized by the American Foreign Service Association.

== Public art ==
The park is the site of the bronze sculpture Discus Thrower, a replica of the ancient statue Discobolus.
