= Townley Caryatid =

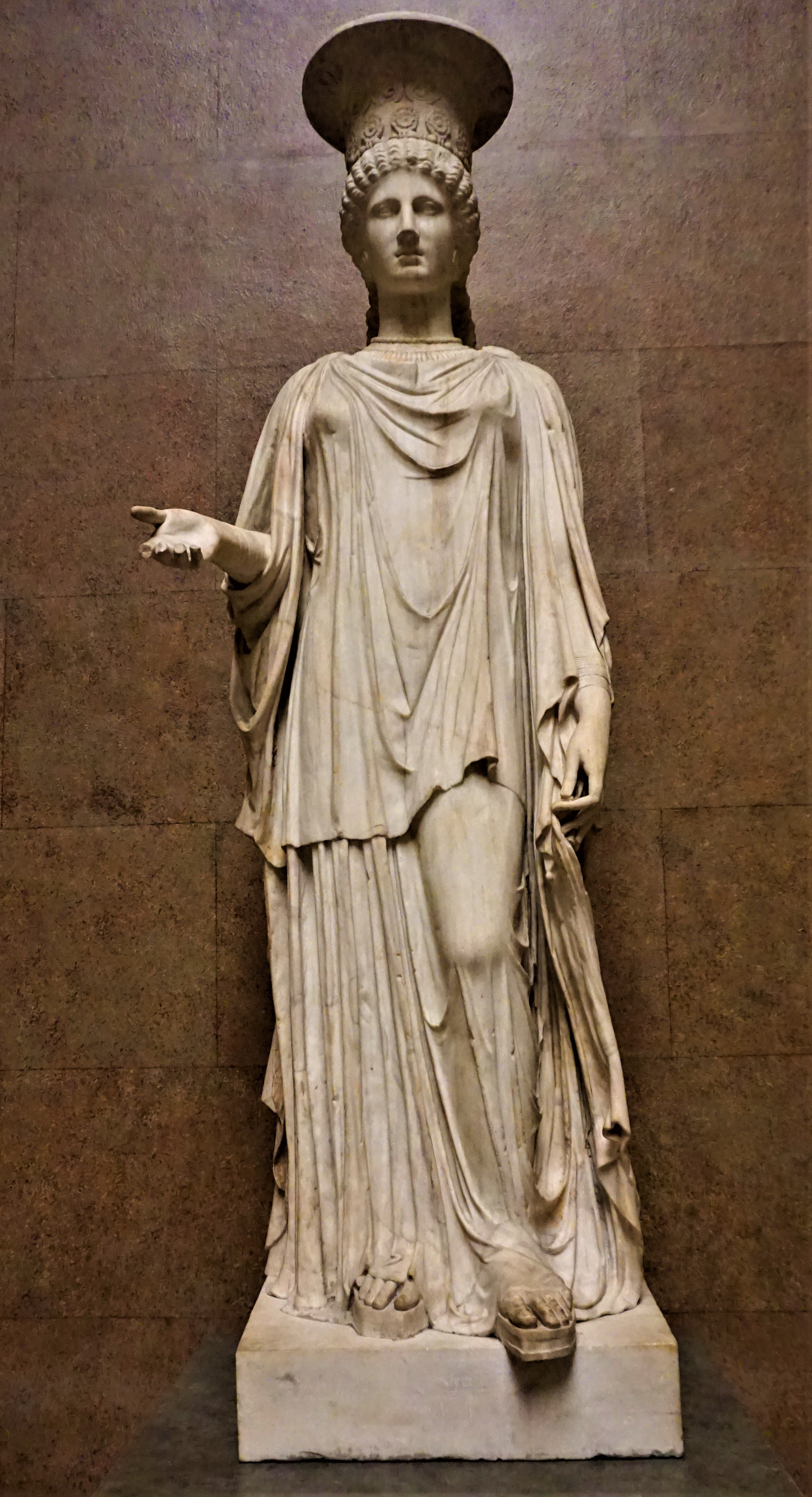
The Caryatid

The Townley Caryatid is a 2.25m high Pentelic marble caryatid, depicting a woman dressed to take part in religious rites (possibly fertility rites related to Demeter or Ceres, due to the cereal motifs on her modius headdress).

It dates to the Roman era, between 140 and 160 AD, and is in the Neo Attic style adapted from 5th century BC Athenian workmanship. It is one of a group of six surviving caryatids found on the same site, arranged to form a colonnade on a building probably in a religious sanctuary built on land fronting on the Via Appia owned by Annia Regilla, wife of the Greek magnate and philosopher Herodes Atticus. This sanctuary was probably dedicated to Demeter. A fragmentary caryatid from the series, now in the Villa Albani, Rome, is signed by the otherwise unknown Athenian sculptors Kriton and Nikolaos.

It was acquired with other purchases from the Villa Montalto in 1787 by Charles Townley, who bequeathed it to the British Museum in 1805, where its catalogue number is 1805, 0703 44. It was until recently in Gallery 84, but is now on the Main Stairs, replacing Townley's Discobolus.
