= Discobolus (Harvard University) =

Sculpture at Harvard University, Cambridge, Massachusetts, U.S.

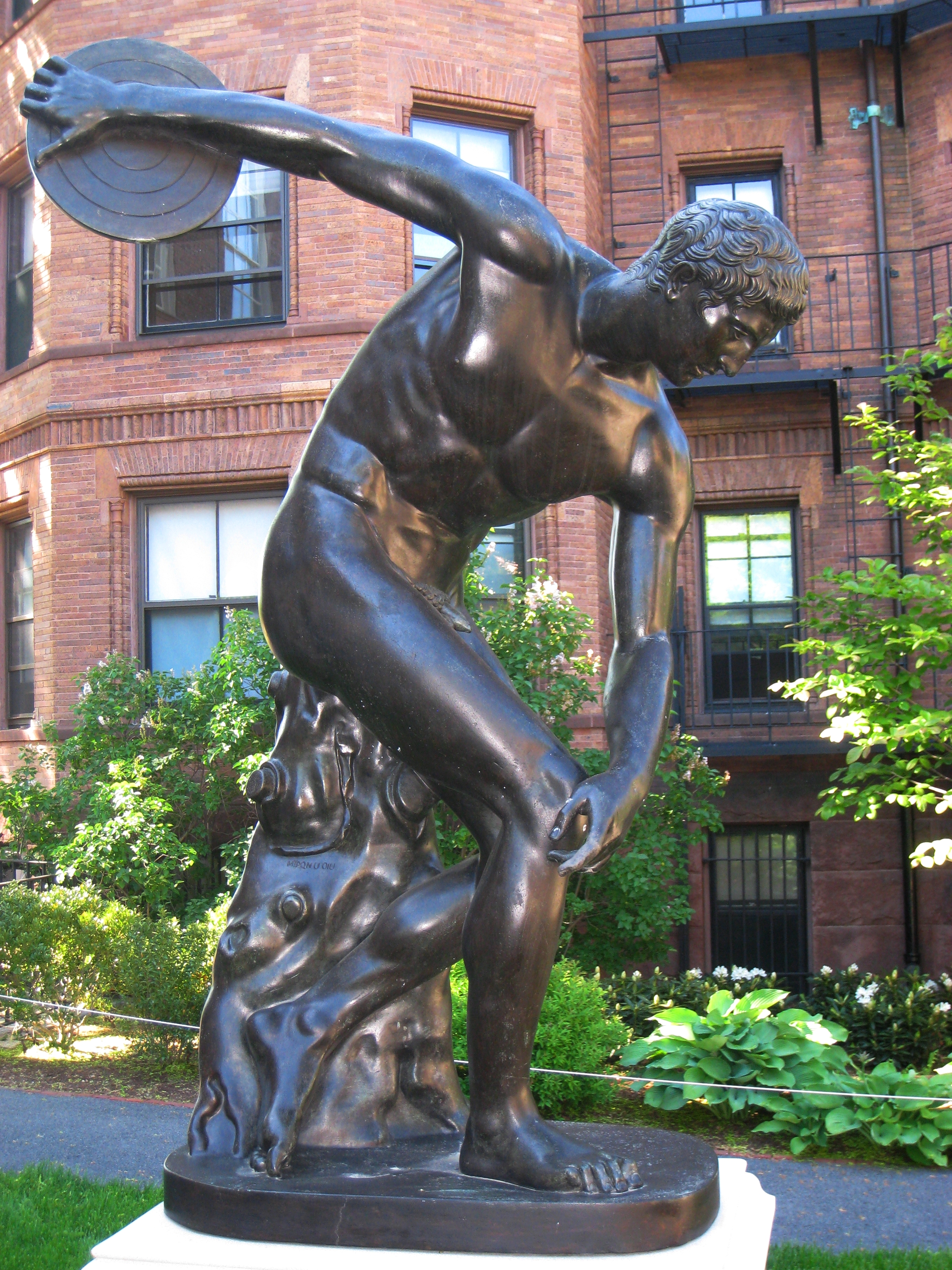
- The statue in 2008
- Medium: Bronze sculpture
- Location: Cambridge, Massachusetts, U.S.
- 42.37713°N 71.11937°W

A bronze replica of Myron's Discobolus is installed on the Harvard University campus in Cambridge, Massachusetts, United States.
