= Charles Townley =

English art collector and antiquarian (1737–1805)

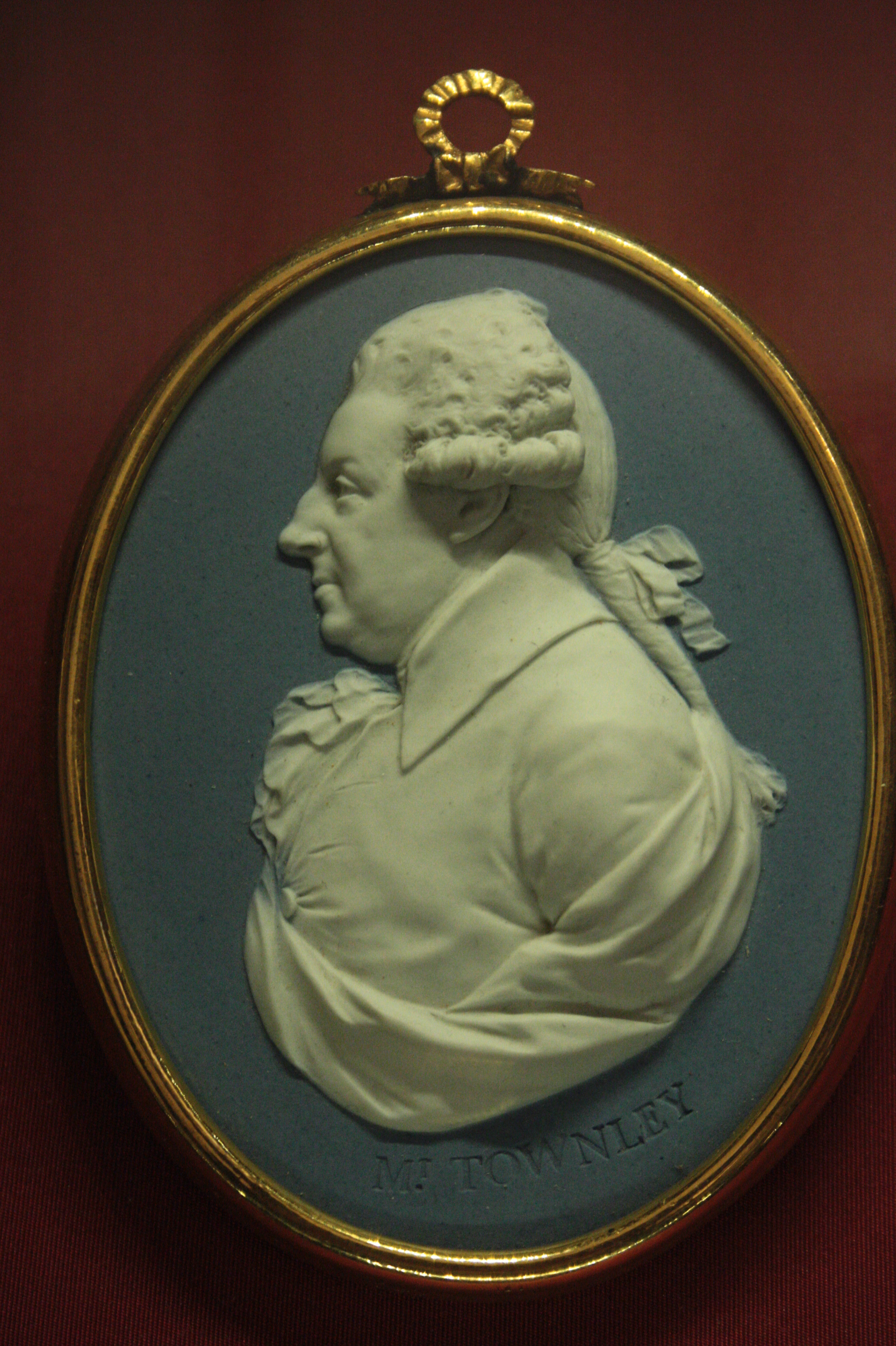
Charles Townley, miniature by Josiah Wedgwood

Charles Townley FRS (1 October 1737 – 3 January 1805) was a wealthy English country gentleman, antiquary and collector, a member of the Towneley family. He travelled on three Grand Tours to Italy, buying antique sculpture, vases, coins, manuscripts and Old Master drawings and paintings. Many of the most important pieces from his collection, especially the Townley Marbles (or Towneley Marbles) are now in the British Museum's Department of Greek and Roman Antiquities. The marbles were overshadowed at the time, and still today, by the Elgin Marbles.

== Biography ==
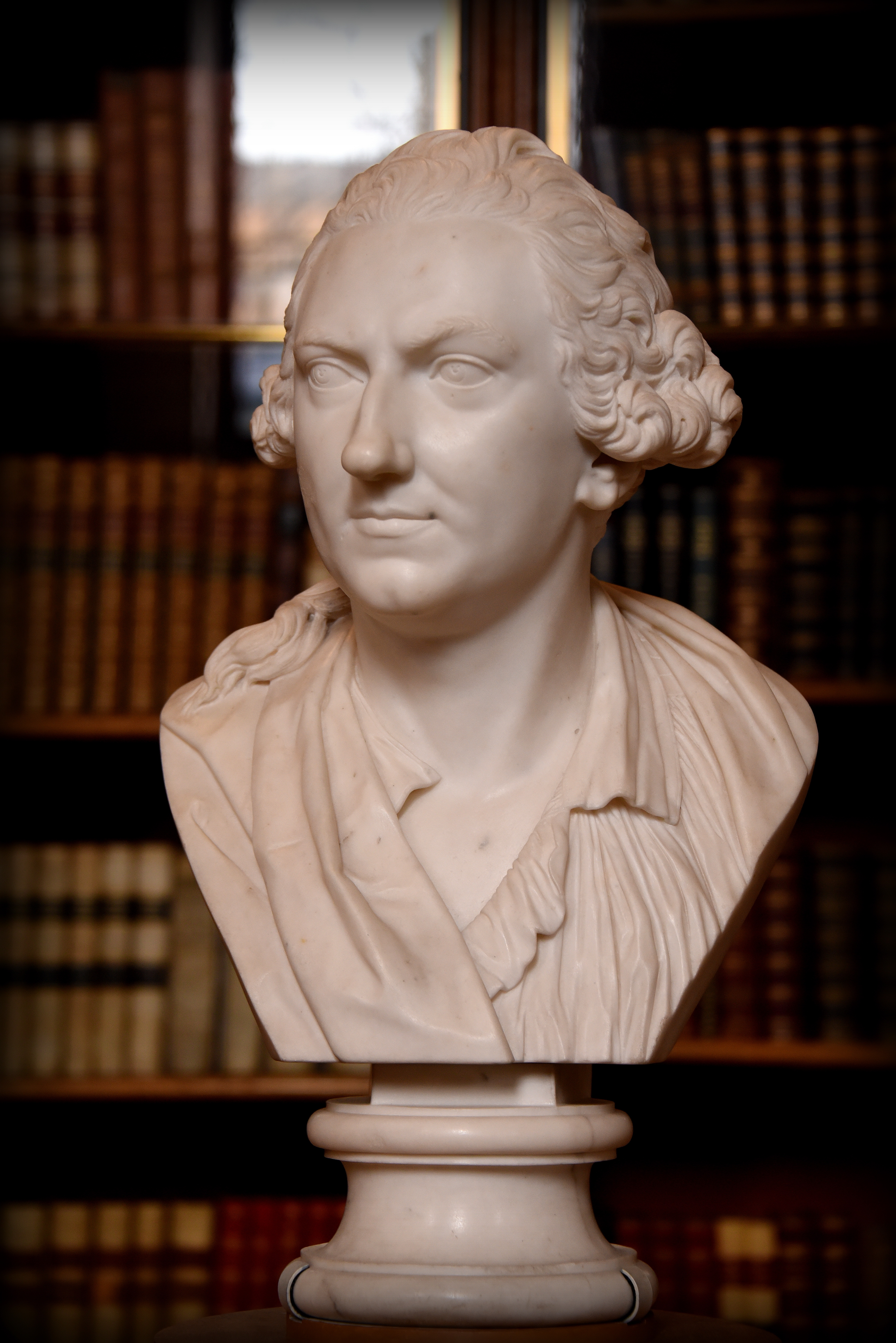
Bust of Charles Townley (1735–1805), by Christopher Hewetson, British Museum

Charles Townley was born in England at Towneley Hall, the family seat, near Burnley in Lancashire, on 1 October 1737. He was the eldest son of William Towneley (1714–1741) and Cecilia, daughter and heiress of Ralph Standish of Standish, Lancashire, and granddaughter of Henry Howard, 6th Duke of Norfolk. From a Catholic family and thus excluded both from public office and from English universities, he was educated at the English College, Douai, and subsequently under John Turberville Needham, the biologist and Roman Catholic priest.

In 1758 he came of age and took up his residence at Towneley Hall, where he made improvements to his estate. In 1765 he left England on the Grand Tour, where he established a base in Rome. He also visited Florence, Southern Italy and Sicily. He returned to London in 1772, but continued to make occasional visits to Italy until 1780. In conjunction with various dealers, including Gavin Hamilton, and Thomas Jenkins, a dealer in antiquities in Rome, he got together a splendid collection of antiquities, known especially for the "Townley Marbles" (or "Towneley"), which was deposited in 1778 in a house built for the purpose in Park Street, now No. 14 Queen Anne's Gate, in the West End of London, where he died on 8 January 1805.

His solitary publication was an account of the Ribchester Helmet in Vetusta Monumenta, a Roman cavalry helmet found near Towneley Hall, and now in the British Museum. He was elected a Fellow of the Royal Society in March 1791. He became a member of the Society of Dilettanti 1786, and made a trustee of the British Museum in 1791.

A large archive of Townley's papers, including diaries, account books, bills, correspondence, and catalogues, was acquired by the British Museum in 1992.

A bust of Townley was made in Carrara marble in 1807 by his associate and friend, sculptor Joseph Nollekens. It shows Townley in herm form – head and neck only, without full shoulders or arms – with a bare neck, dishevelled hair and a pensive expression. The National Heritage Memorial Fund, in whose 2008-9 annual report the bust is described as "masterfully executed", made a grant of £187,000 to help purchase the bust so that it could be returned to Towneley Hall Museum in the collector's former family home on the outskirts of Burnley.

== Townley Collection ==
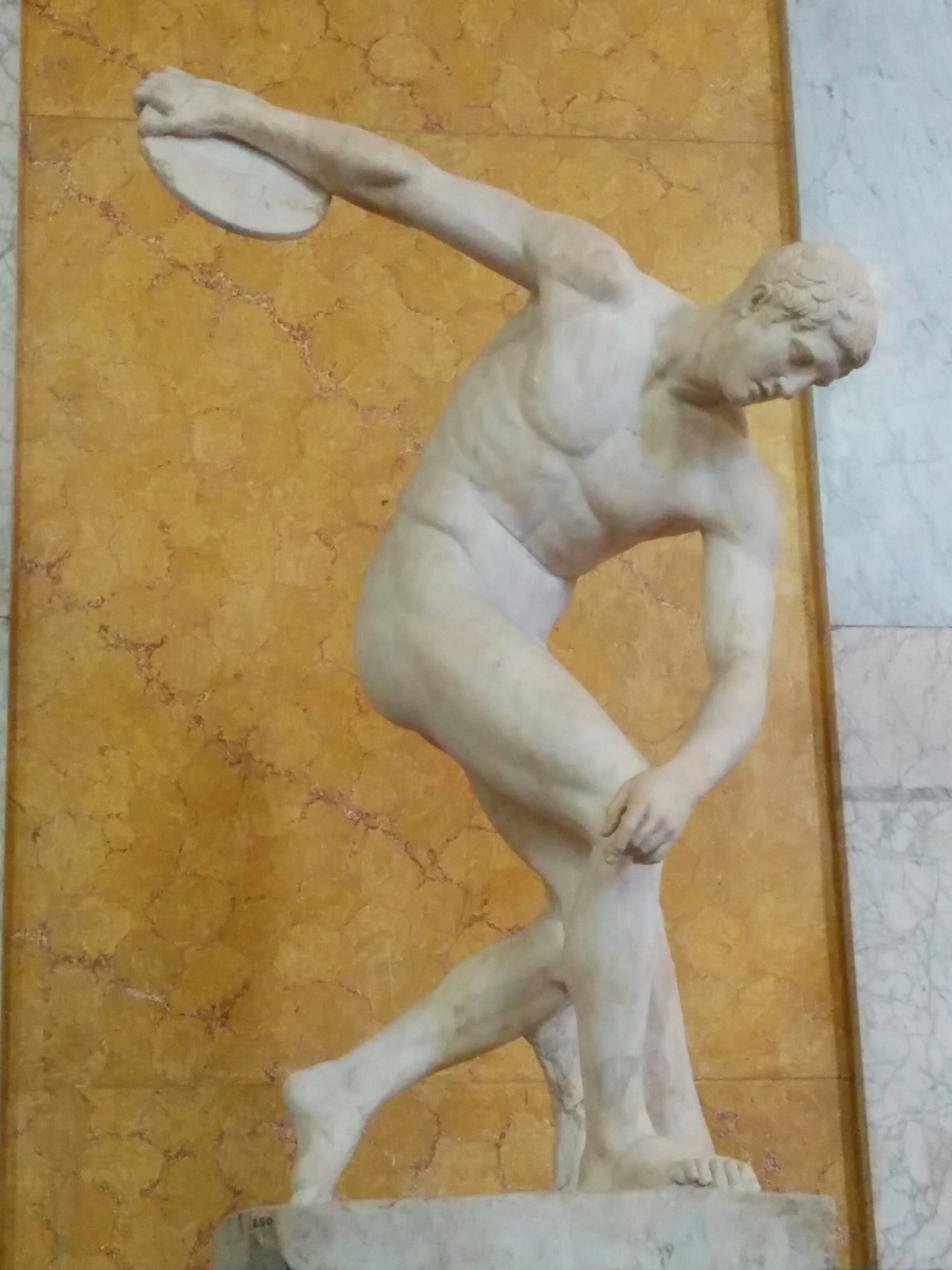
Roman marble copy of Myron's Discobolus. Towneley Marbles, British Museum

The antiquities collected by Townley, which now constitute the Townley Collection at the British Museum, consists of some 300 items and includes one of the great collections of Graeco-Roman sculptures and other artefacts. Prominent amongst this collection are:

- The Cannibal a fragmentary sculpture of two boys fighting over a game of knucklebones identified by Johann Joachim Winckelmann as the Astragalizontes by the classical Greek sculptor Polykleitos
- Bust of Clytie, thought by Townley to be Isis emerging from a sacred lotus
- Townley Hadrian
- Townley Antinous
- Cista Mystica
- A relief of Pan with Jupiter and three nymphs holding shells
- Pair of statues of Pan, signed by Marcus Cossutius Cerdo
- Tombstone of the shoemaker Xanthippos
- Townley Caryatid
- Townley Discobolus by Myron, from Hadrian's Villa
- Townley Greyhounds
- Townley Sphinx
- Townley Vase, from the Villa of Antoninus Pius at Monte Cagnolo
- Townley Venus
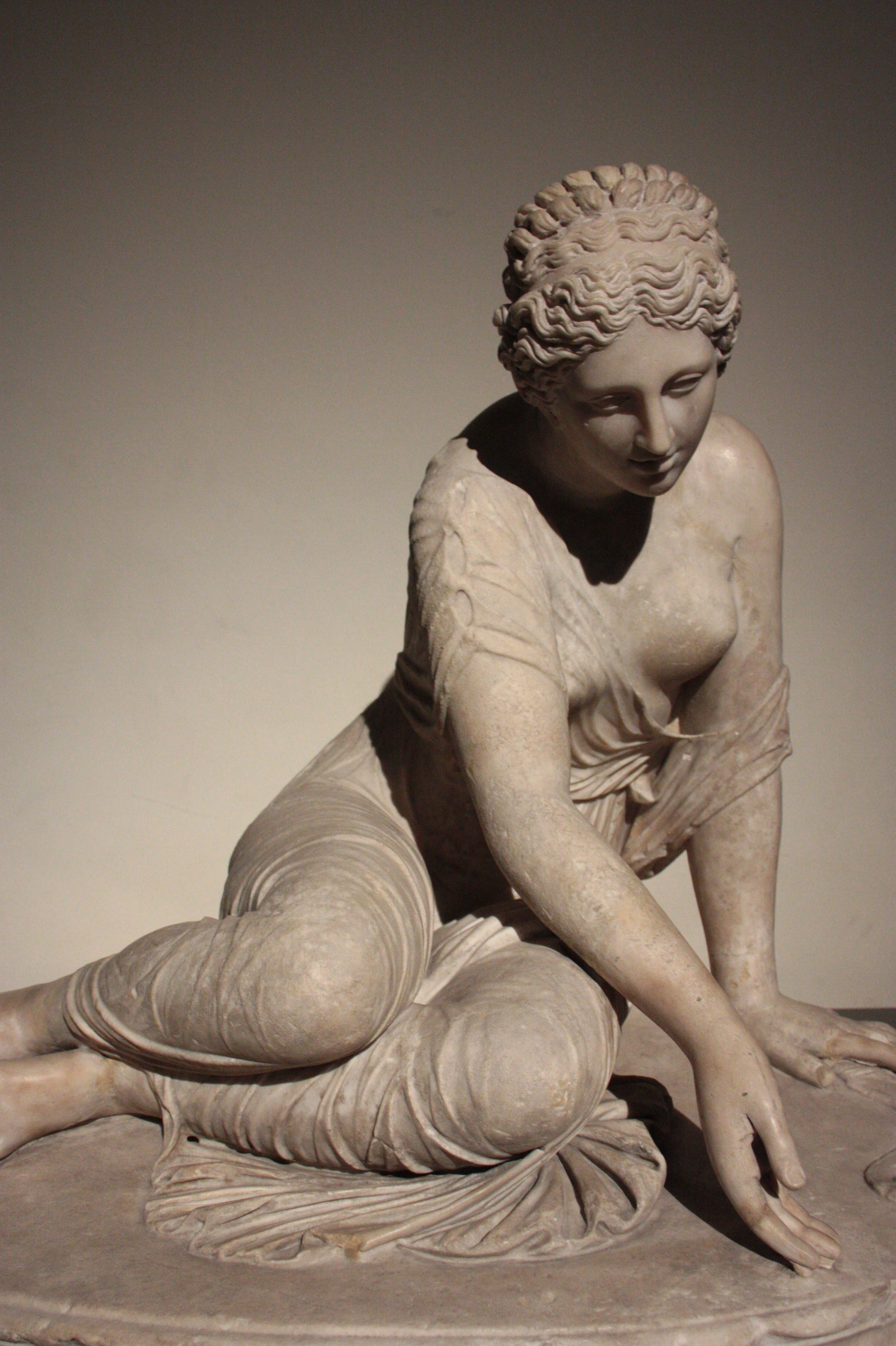
The Knuckle Bone Player (Roman c.150AD)

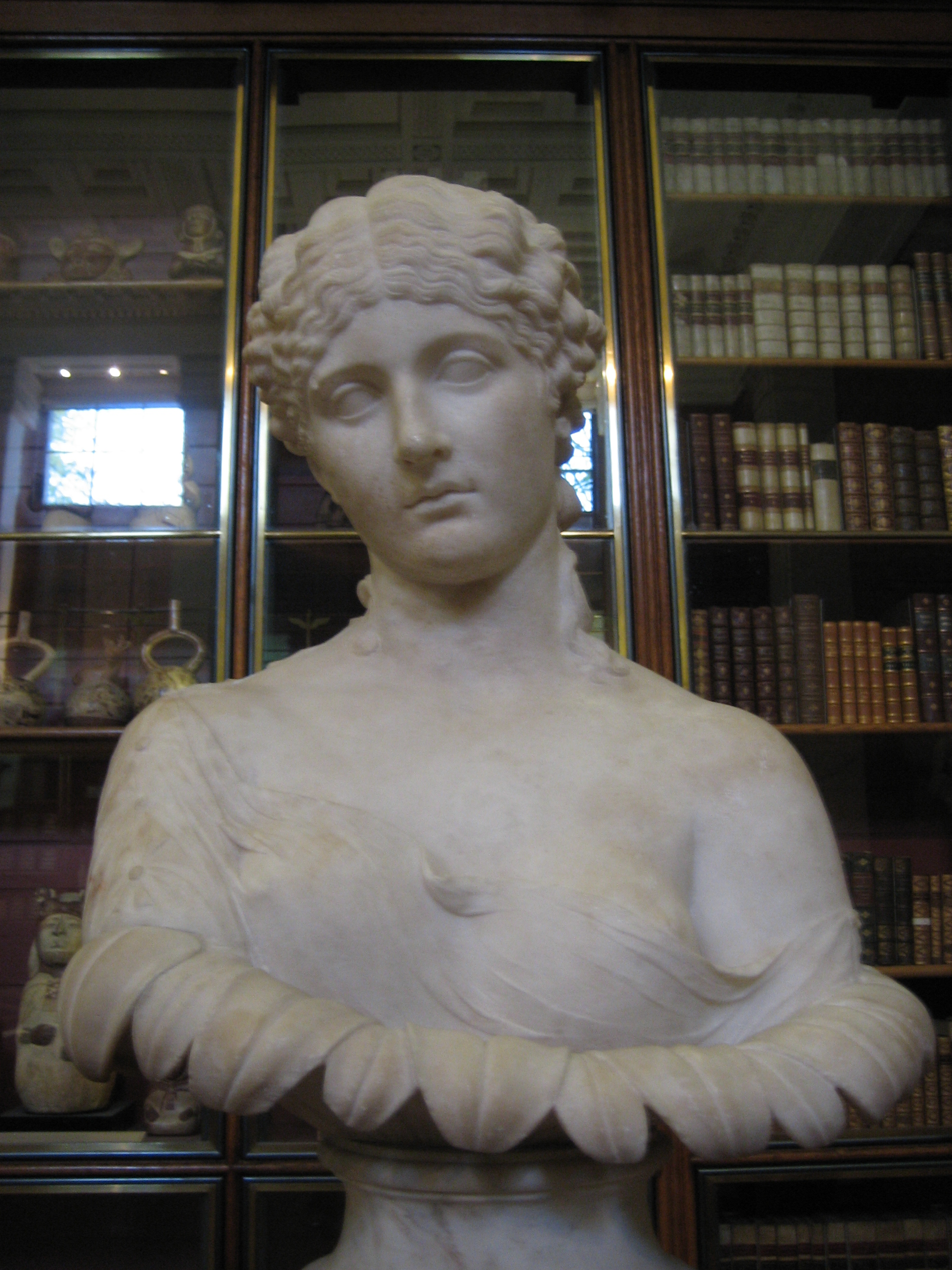
Bust of Clytie

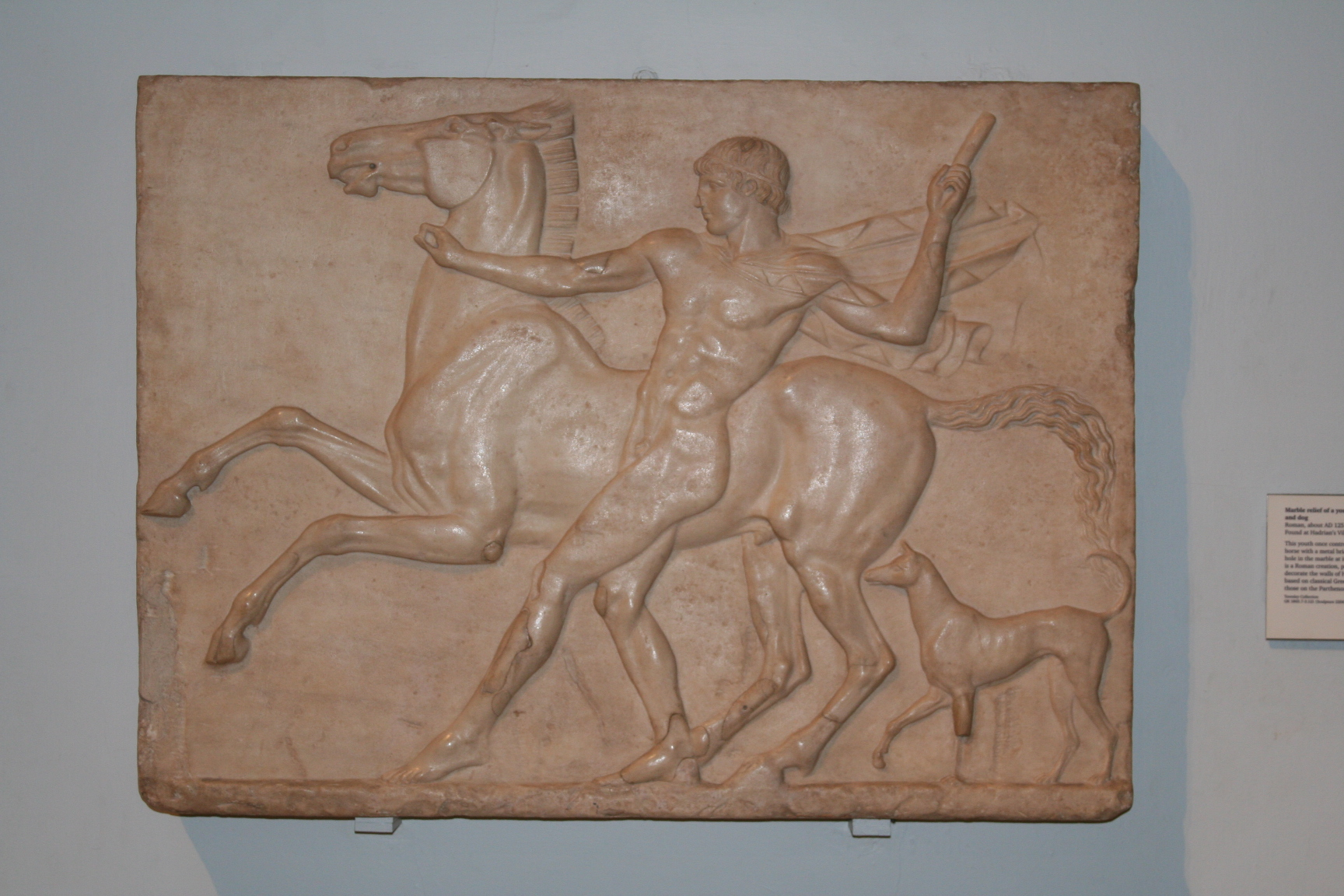
A relief from Townley's collection, from Hadrian's Villa near Tivoli, ca. 125 AD

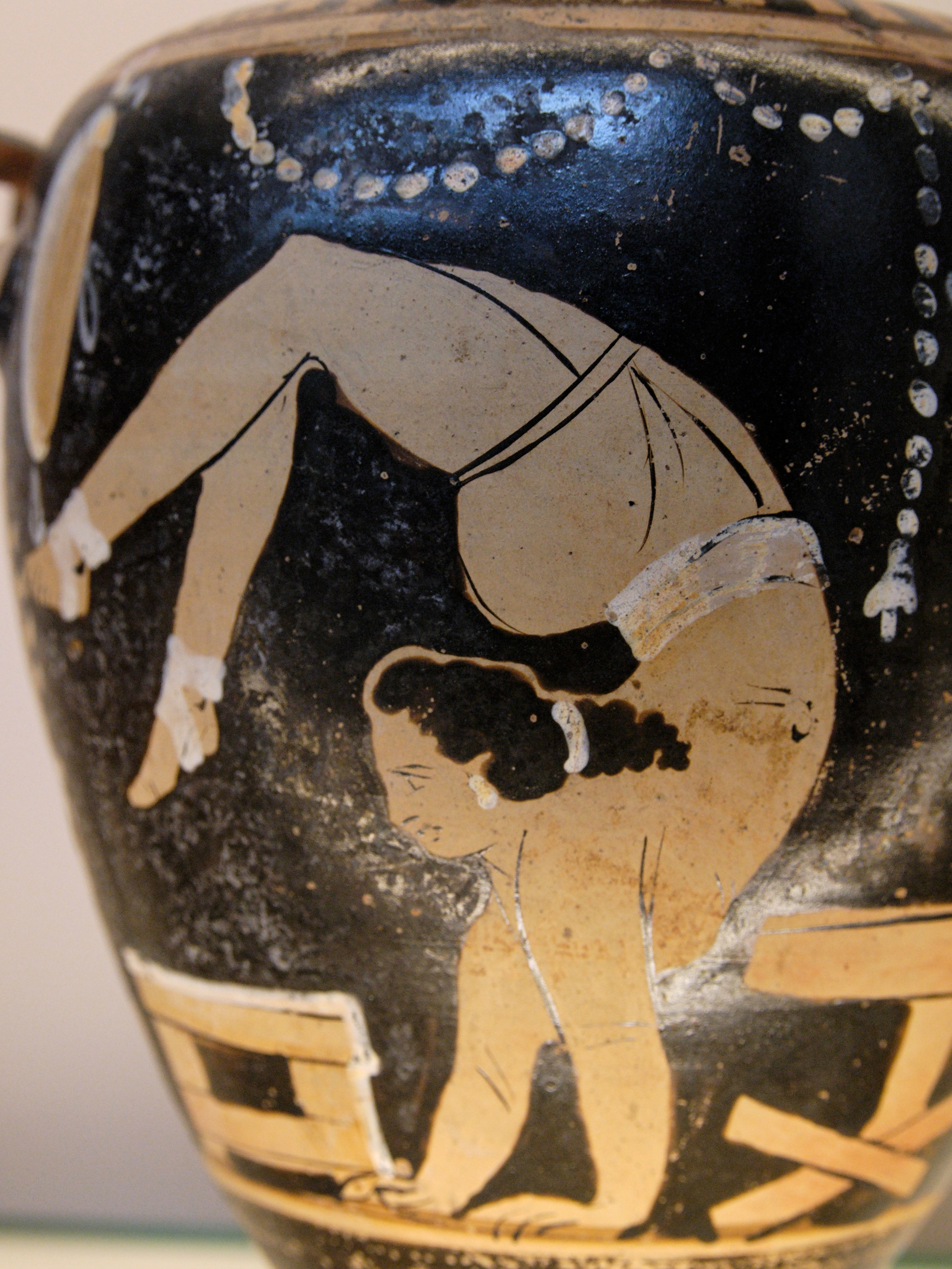
A female acrobat next to a potter's turntable. Detail from a Campanian red-figure hydria, ca. 340-330 BC.

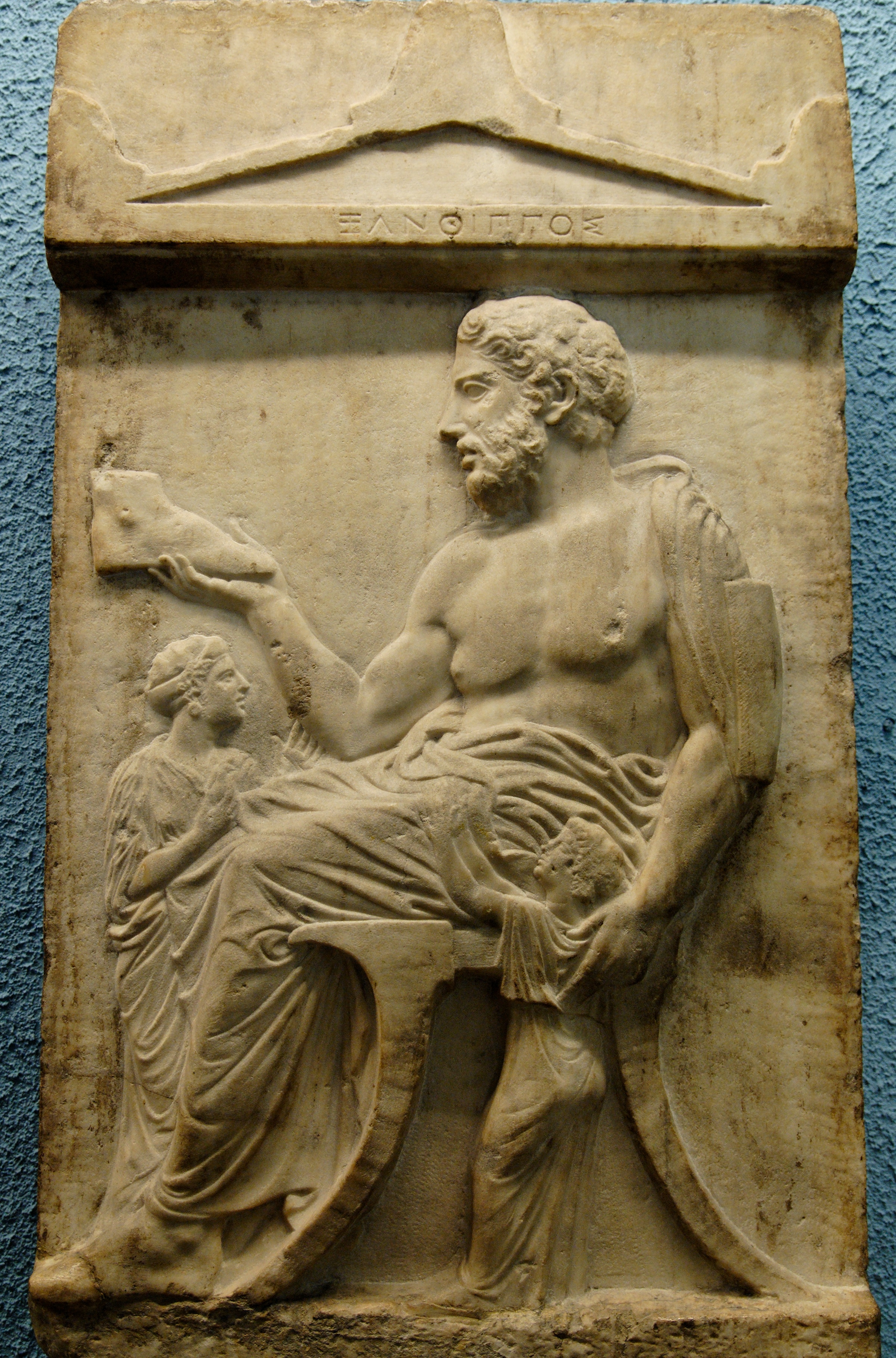
Tombstone of the shoemaker Xanthippos. Marble, Greek artwork, ca. 430-420 BC. From Athens

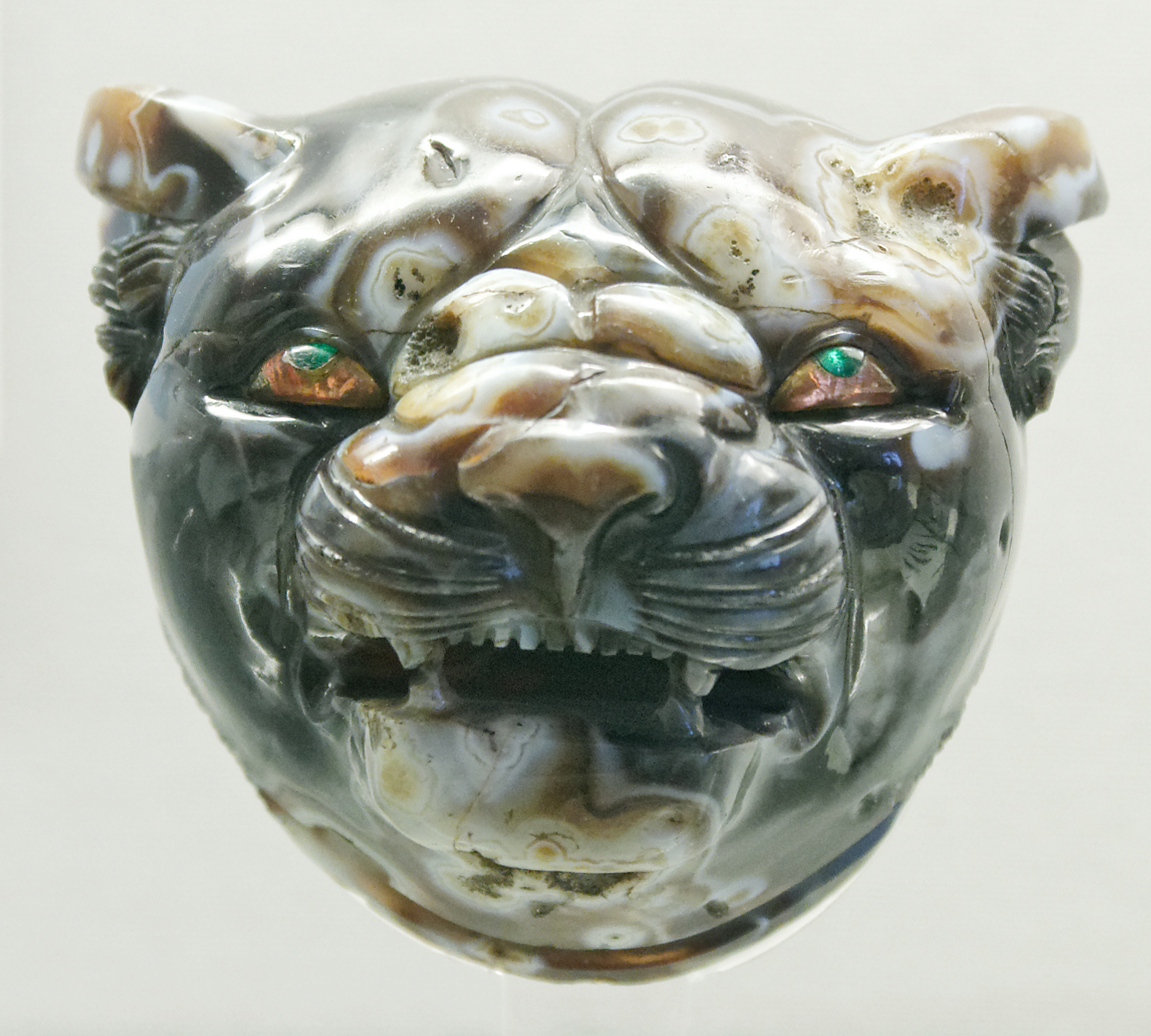
Head of a tiger, possibly a boss from the arms of a throne; Indian

=== The collection in Townley's house at 7 Park Street ===
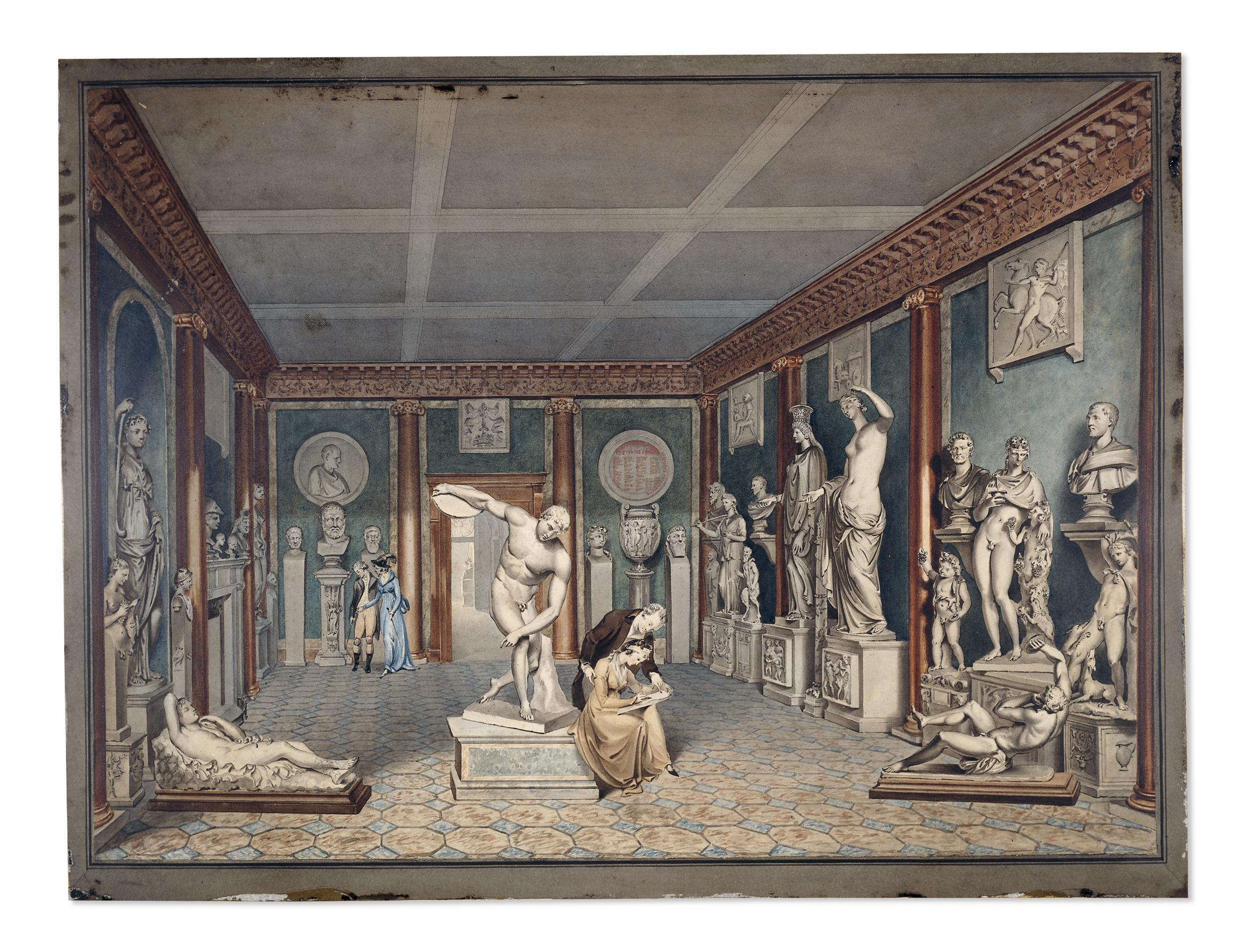
William Chambers, The sculpture collection of Charles Townley in the dining room of his house, 1794, British Museum

In 1778, following his last Grand Tour, he moved into a large house located in London, at 7 Park Street, in Westminster (now 14 Queen Anne’s Gate). The house was built by Mr. Barrett and the architect Samuel Wyatt.

On the ground floor, the collection was displayed in the entrance hall, the drawing room and the dining room. The entrance hall features reliefs, urns and sculptures. The dining room was the largest room, housing most of the large marble sculptures of the collection, such as the Discobolus, the Townley Caryatid and the Townley Venus. On the first floor, the collection was displayed in the library and two small drawing rooms. The collector arranged his home in a symmetrical display, where the artworks complemented each other. The interior of the house is depicted in William Chambers’ watercolours and in Johann Zoffany’s painting.

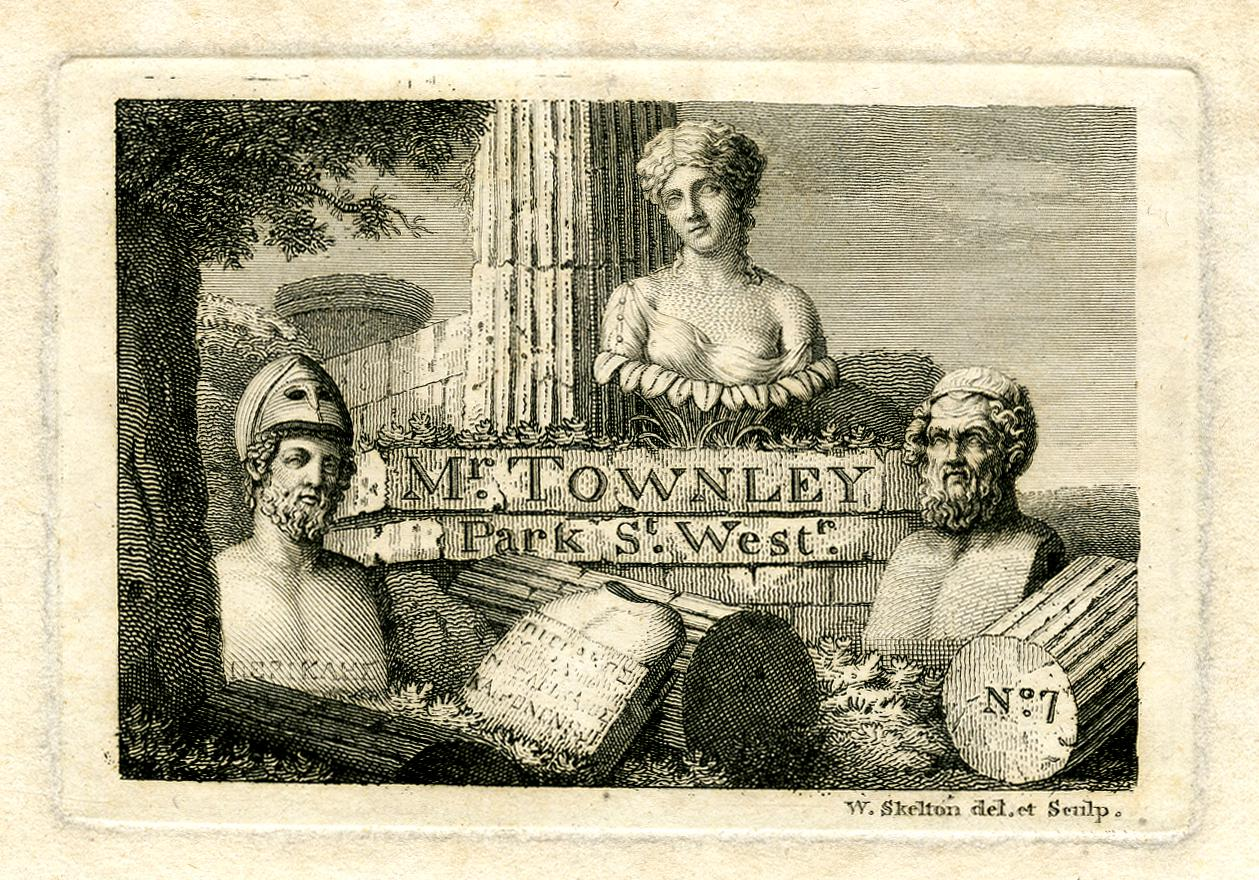
William Skelton, Charles Townley's visiting card, 1778-1848, British Museum

His house was decorated in an ‘antique style’, with red and blue walls evoking Pompeian frescoes. They were also decorated with ionic columns, niches, friezes and theater masks.

Charles Townley’s house was open to the public, he promoted his collection with a card designed by William Skelton. The collector gave tours of his collection and provided a visitor’s leaflet with information about the marbles (descriptions, dates, origins, restorations).

=== The collection in the British Museum ===
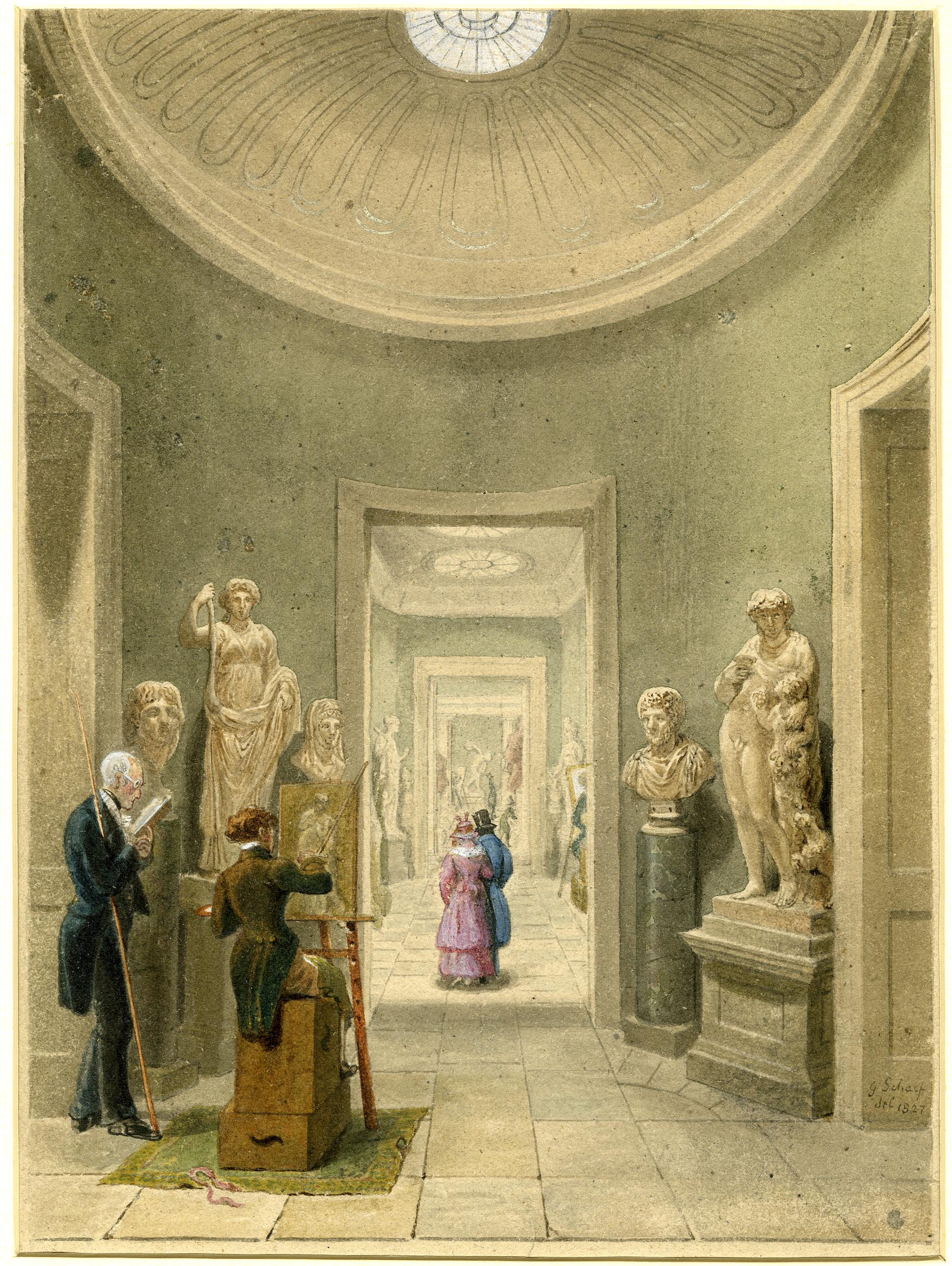
George Scharf, The Townley Gallery, 1827, British Museum

When the collector died on 3 January 1805, the future of his collection was uncertain. Charles Townley had written a will in which he bequeathed all his marbles to the British Museum. However, shortly before his death he decided to leave it to the care of his brother Edward and his uncle John Townley on the condition that the sculptures should be exhibited in a purpose-built gallery. In reaction the Museum wrote a petition, dated 5 June 1805, expressing the desire to acquire the collection for £20,000 because of its quality and its popularity. The trustees of the museum obtained a parliamentary grant specifically for the purpose. Therefore, his family agreed to sell the collection of marbles and terracottas to the British Museum. The smaller antiquities, including coins, engraved gems, and pottery, followed in 1814, they were purchased by the museum from Peregrine Edward Towneley.

In order to house the massive collection, the Montague House of the British Museum was enlarged with a new gallery entitled the Townley Gallery, opened on 3 June 1808. Its interior is known from watercolours and engravings. As the collection of the museum's Greek and Roman antiquities grew, it became clear that the original building was too small for its purpose. The old Jacobean mansion was pulled down in 1823. In turn the Townley Gallery was pulled down in 1846 and the collection was moved to the new building housing the museum, designed by Sir Robert Smirke, with grand rooms arranged over two floors around a central courtyard. The collection was displayed in the Graeco-Roman rooms. In 1984, under the Duveen Gallery, former storage rooms were converted into exhibition rooms, and a Townley Room was created reuniting the marbles. Today, the artworks are displayed in various rooms especially in the section ‘Greek and Roman sculpture’.

=== Painting by Johann Zoffany ===
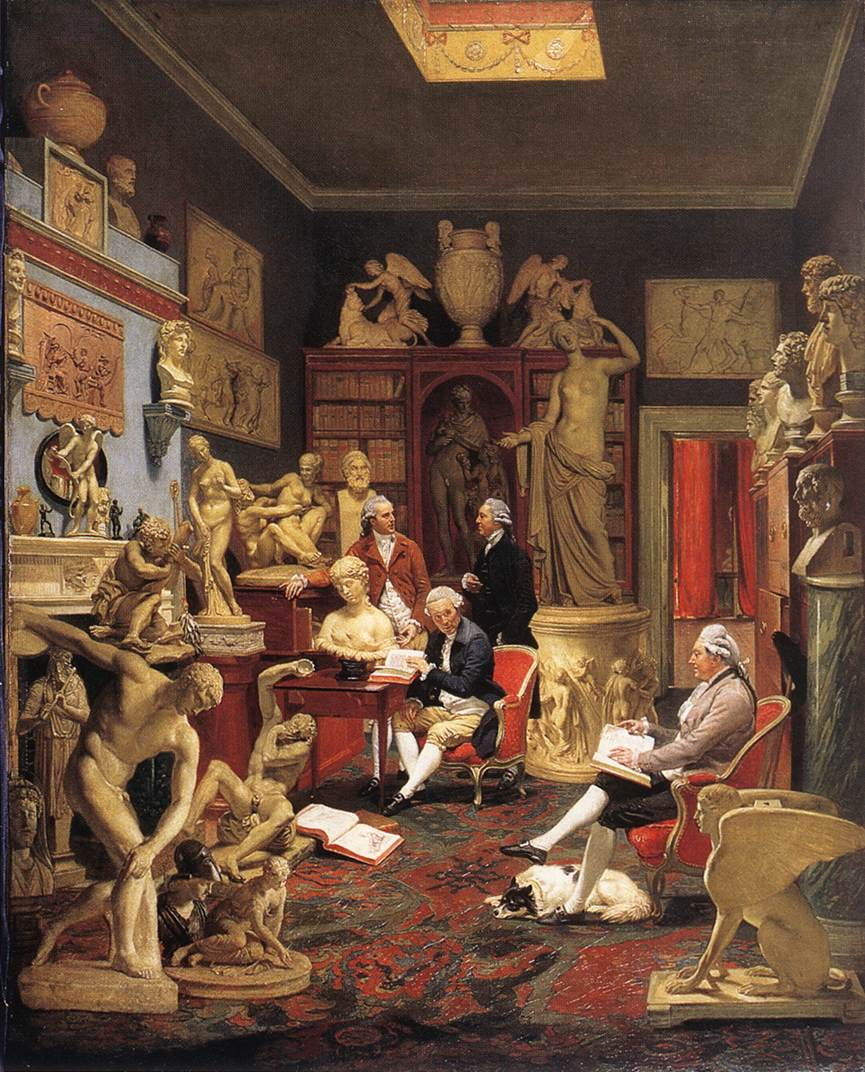
Charles Townley in the Park St. Gallery by Zoffany, 1782, Burnley. Top, on the bookcase, the Townley Vase. Right, on a puteal (wellhead), the Townley Venus.

Charles Townley became the most famous member of the family and another of the treasures now at Towneley is a conversation piece by Johan Zoffany of Townley in his London house surrounded by an imaginary arrangement of his major sculptures (over forty are represented). (Note: In August 1781 Townley wrote to James Byres, the antiquary and dealer in Rome, that "Mr Zoffany is painting, in the Stile of his Florence tribune, a room in my house, wherein he introduces what Subjects he chuses in my collection. It will be a picture of extraordinary effect & truth..." (Kitto 2005).) Engaged in discussion with him are three fellow connoisseurs, the palaeographer Charles Astle, Hon. Charles Francis Greville, F.R.S., and Pierre-François Hugues d'Hancarville.

Prominent in front are Townley's Roman marble of the Discobolus, (Note: It was discovered at Hadrian's Villa in 1790 and purchased by Towneley in 1792; it was such an important addition to the Towneley marbles that Zoffany was called in to add it to the painting. The head looking forward was a controversial restoration.) the Nymph with a Shell, of which the most famous variant was also in the Borghese collection (Note: Now at the Musée du Louvre.) and a Faun of the Barberini type. On a pedestal in front of the fireplace, the Boys Fighting from the Barberini collection had been Towneley's first major purchase, in 1768 (Winckelmann had identified it as a lost original by Polykleitos). In point of fact, Towneley's only Greek original appears to have been the grave relief on the left wall above the Bust of a Maenad posed on a wall bracket.

The so-called Bust of Clytie (Note: Towneley purchased it directly from the Laurenzano family in Naples in July 1772 for 530 ducats (Kitto 2005)) perches on the small writing-table, in Zoffany's assembly of the Townley marbles. It was extensively reproduced in marble, plaster, and the white bisque porcelain called parian ware for its supposed resemblance to Parian marble. Goethe owned two casts of this. The Bust of Clytie was apparently Townley's favourite sculpture and the one he took with him when he was forced to flee his home during the anti-Catholic riots of 1780.

The Townley Venus on a Roman well-head that serves as drum pedestal had been discovered by Gavin Hamilton at Ostia and quietly shipped out of the Papal States as two fragmentary pieces. The marble Townley Vase, also furtively exported, stands on the bookcase at the rear: it was excavated about 1774 by Gavin Hamilton at Monte Cagnolo.
