= Townley Vase =

Roman vase

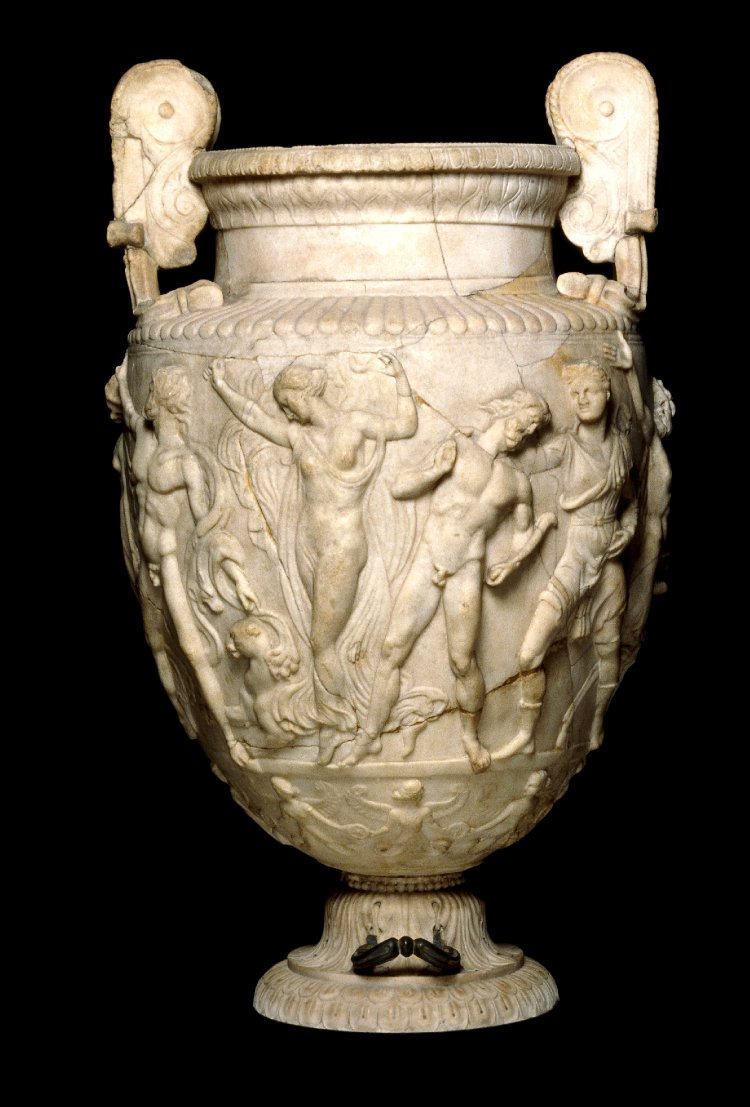
Townley Vase

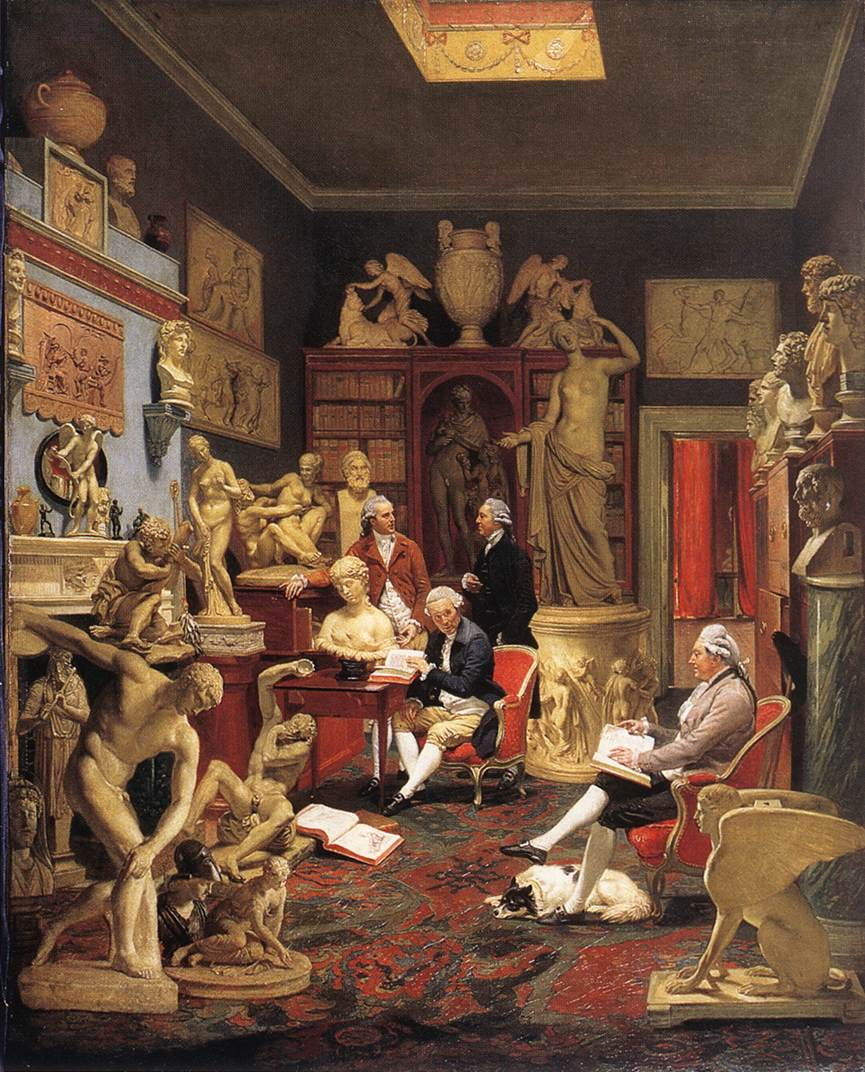
John Zoffany's painting Charles Townley in his Gallery shows both the Townley Vase (on top of the bookcase) and the Townley Venus statue.

The Townley Vase is a large Roman marble vase of the 2nd century, discovered in 1773 by the Scottish antiquarian and dealer in antiquities Gavin Hamilton in excavating a Roman villa at Monte Cagnola (Montecanino) considered to have been a villa of Antoninus Pius, between Genzano and Civita Lavinia, near the ancient Lanuvium, in Lazio, southeast of Rome. The ovoid vase has volute handles in the manner of a pottery krater. It is carved with a deep frieze in bas-relief, occupying most of the body, illustrating a Bacchanalian procession. Its name comes from the English collector Charles Townley, who purchased it from Hamilton in 1774 for £250. Townley's collection, long on display in his London house in Park Street, was bought for the British Museum after his death in 1805.

In the 19th century it was often imagined that Keats' Ode on a Grecian Urn (1819) was inspired by the Townley Vase, though modern critics suggest instead that the inspiration was more generic, and may have also owed something to scenes portrayed on William Hamilton's collection of Greek vases which entered the BM collection at around the same time.

Copies of the Townley Vase were made in plaster and imitation marble throughout the 19th century. At the turn of the 20th century terracotta versions were made by Manifattura di Signa in Italy. Between the World Wars, table lamps modelled after the Townley Vase identified "cultured" households.

== See also ==
- Townley Venus
