= Townley Venus =

Roman sculpture of Venus

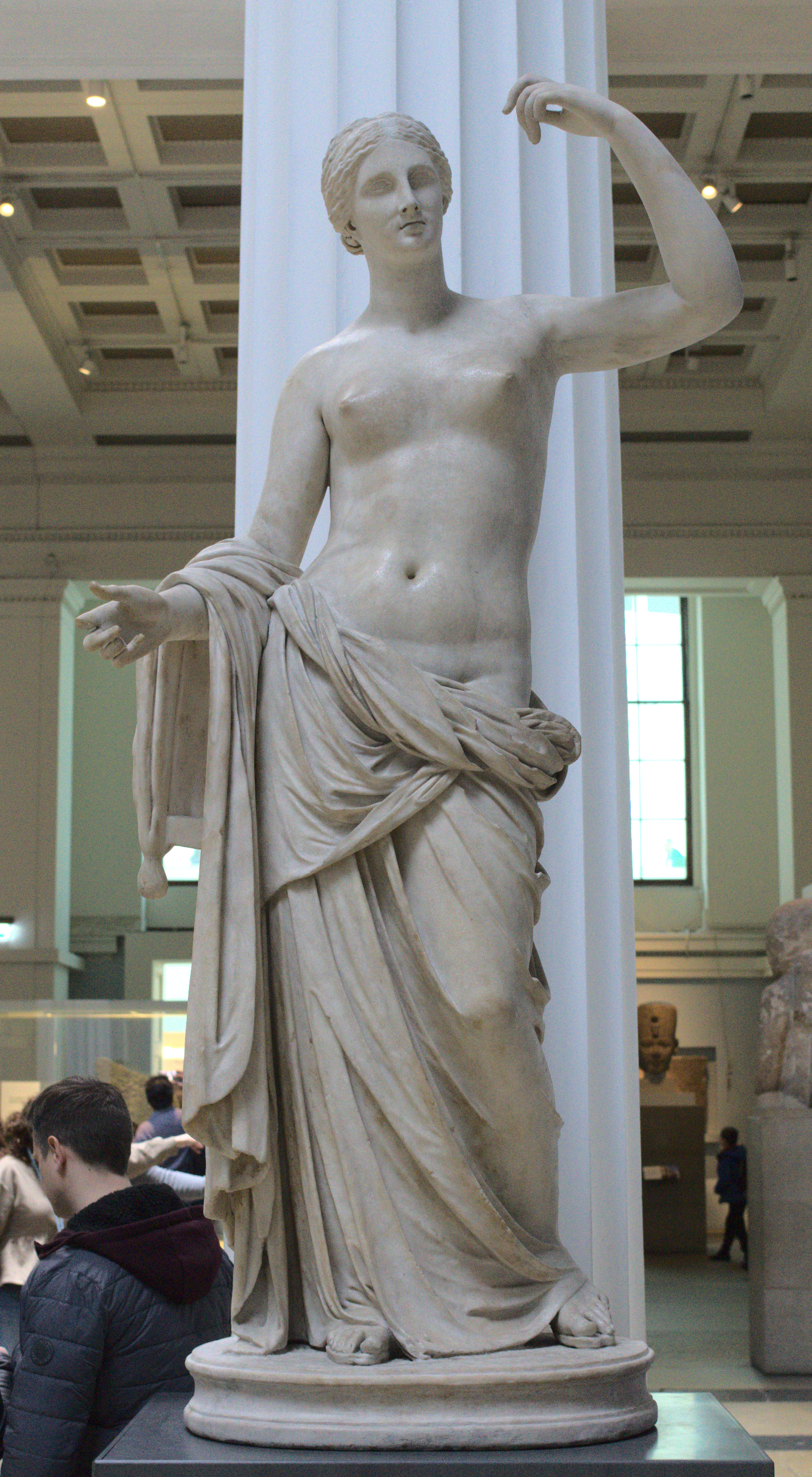
The Townley Venus on display in the British Museum.

The Townley Venus is a 2.14 m (7 ft) high 1st or 2nd century AD Roman sculpture in Proconnesian marble of the goddess Venus, from the collection of Charles Towneley.

Adapted from a lost Greek original of the 4th century BC, the goddess is half-draped, with her torso nude. The arms were restored in the 18th century and the statue was set in another plinth, thereby changing the original pose and viewpoint. If the restoration is correct, her arms are in a pose reminiscent of the Venus of Capua or Venus de Milo, and like them she may have held a mirror.

== History ==
Townley Venus was found in the ruins of the Baths of the Emperor Claudius in Ostia by Gavin Hamilton in 1775. Hamilton was sent a letter to Townley in January 1776, informing Townley of the statue's existence. After Townley learned of the statue, the two quickly entered negotiations. The two reached an agreement in May 1777, historians are unsure whether it was sold for £600 or £700. Hamilton didn't send the statue to be noted in Rome, even shipping the statue in two pieces to avoid sending the statue to Rome.

It was sold to the British Museum in 1805 as Registration Number 1805,0703.15 and Sculpture 1574, and is usually on display in Room 84, although it went on tour to the 2007 Praxiteles exhibition at the Louvre.

In 2012, Townley Venus was damaged and then fixed when someone knocked off part of the statue's hand.

The statue was damaged in December 2015 when a waiter working in the museum accidentally hit the right hand which knocked off the thumb but it has since been restored.

== Inspired works ==
Yinka Shonibare used a cast of Townley Venus to produce his work, “Venus Presenting Helen to Paris (with Townley Venus).” The work by Shonibare differs from the original by being wrapped in patterns commonly used in African clothing and having its head replaced with a globe. The work was shown at the exhibition in London’s Royal Academy, From Life. The work was also shown in a virtual reality garden that was inspired by a Scottish neoclassical painting.

== See also ==
- Townley Vase
