= Myron =

Athenian sculptor, 5th century BC

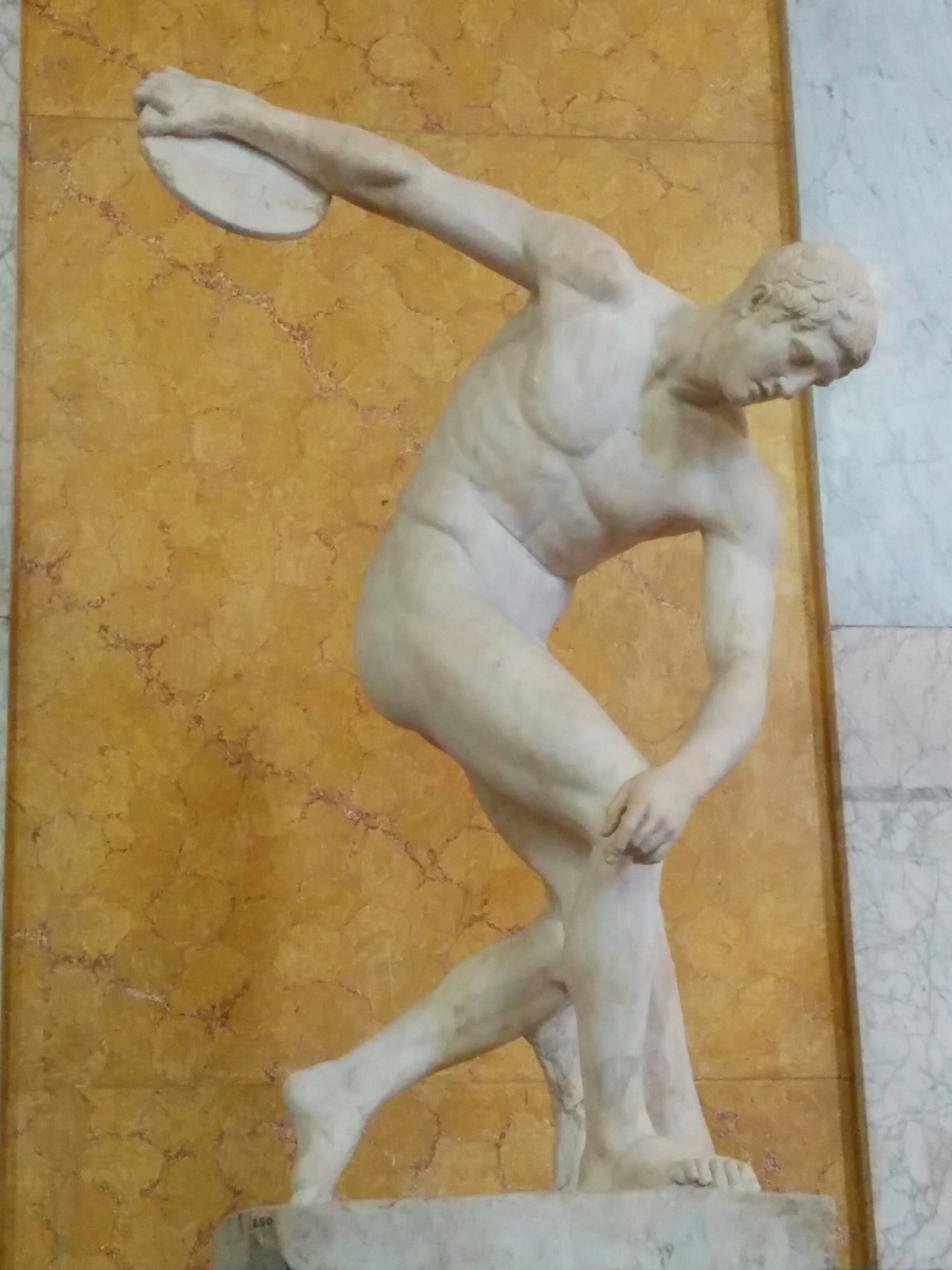
Roman marble copy of Myron's most famous work, the Discobolus. Towneley Marbles, British Museum

Myron of Eleutherae (/ˈmaɪrən/; Ancient Greek: Μύρων, Myrōn [mý.rɔːn]; c. 485 – c. 440 BC) was an Athenian sculptor from the mid-5th century BC. Alongside three other Greek sculptors, Polykleitos, Pheidias, and Praxiteles, Myron is considered as one of the most important sculptors of classical antiquity. He was born in Eleutherae on the borders of Boeotia and Attica. According to Natural History, a Latin encyclopedia by Pliny the Elder (AD 23–79), a scholar in Ancient Rome, Ageladas of Argos was his teacher.

None of his original sculptures are known to survive, but there are many later copies of his works, such as his Discobolus, mostly Roman.

== Reputation ==
Myron worked almost exclusively in bronze and his fame rested principally upon his representations of athletes (including his iconic Diskobolos), in which he made a revolution, according to commentators in Antiquity, by introducing greater boldness of pose and a more perfect rhythm, subordinating the parts to the whole. Pliny's remark that Myron's works were numerosior than those of Polycleitus and "more diligent" seem to suggest that they were considered more harmonious in proportions (numeri) and at the same time more convincing in realism: diligentia connoted "attentive care to fine points", a quality that, in moderation, was characteristic of the best works of art, according to critics in Antiquity.

== Works ==
According to Pliny's Natural History, Myron's most famous works included "heifer, a dog (canem, Cerberus?), a Perseus, a satyr (Marsyas) admiring the flute and Minerva (Athena), a Hercules, which was taken to the shrine dedicated by Pompey the Great at the Circus Maximus, Discobolus (the discus thrower), and an Apollo for Ephesus, "which Antony the triumvir took from the Ephesians, but the deified Augustus restored it again after being warned in a dream". The Early Imperial Roman writers consistently rated Myron among the greatest of Greek sculptors, a sign that his contemporaneous reputation had remained high. The heifer seems to have earned its fame mainly by serving as a peg on which to hang epigrams, which tell nothing about the pose of the animal.

Chionis, a 7th-century BC Olympic victor from Sparta, was commemorated in an idealized bronze by Myron.

== Attributions ==
An epigram on Ladas, the fleetest runner of his time, notes that he was commemorated in a sculpture by Myron; of Myron's Ladas there is no known copy. A description by Lucian conclusively identifies as Myron's the Discobolus or "Discus-Thrower", of which several copies exist, of which the best is in the Palazzo Massimi alle Terme, Rome. Strabo also registers stray comments on Myron, especially a large group at Samos; several surviving heads were identified as copies of Myron's Samian Athena by C.K. Jenkins in 1926.

A marble figure in the Lateran Museum, which is now restored as a dancing satyr, is almost certainly a copy of a work of Myron, a Marsyas desirous of picking up the aulos which Athena had thrown away. The full group is copied on coins of Athens, on a vase and in a relief which represent Marsyas as oscillating between curiosity and the fear of the displeasure of Athena. The ancient critics say of Myron that while he succeeded admirably in giving life and motion to his figures, he did not succeed in rendering the emotions of the mind. This agrees with the extant evidence, in a certain degree, though not perfectly. The bodies of his men are of far greater excellence than the heads. The face of the Marsyas is almost a mask; but from the attitude we gain a vivid impression of the passions which sway him. The face of the discus-thrower is calm and unruffled; but all the muscles of his body are concentrated in an effort.

A considerable number of other extant works were ascribed to the school or the influence of Myron by Adolf Furtwängler. These attributions have not stood up to the test of time. A papyrus from Oxyrhyncus gives dates of victors at Olympia of whom Myron made statues of the athlete Timanthes, victorious at Olympia in 456 BC, and of Lycinus, victorious in 448 BC and 444 BC. This helps us to fix his date. He was a contemporary, but a somewhat older contemporary, of Pheidias and Polykleitos.

== Gallery ==
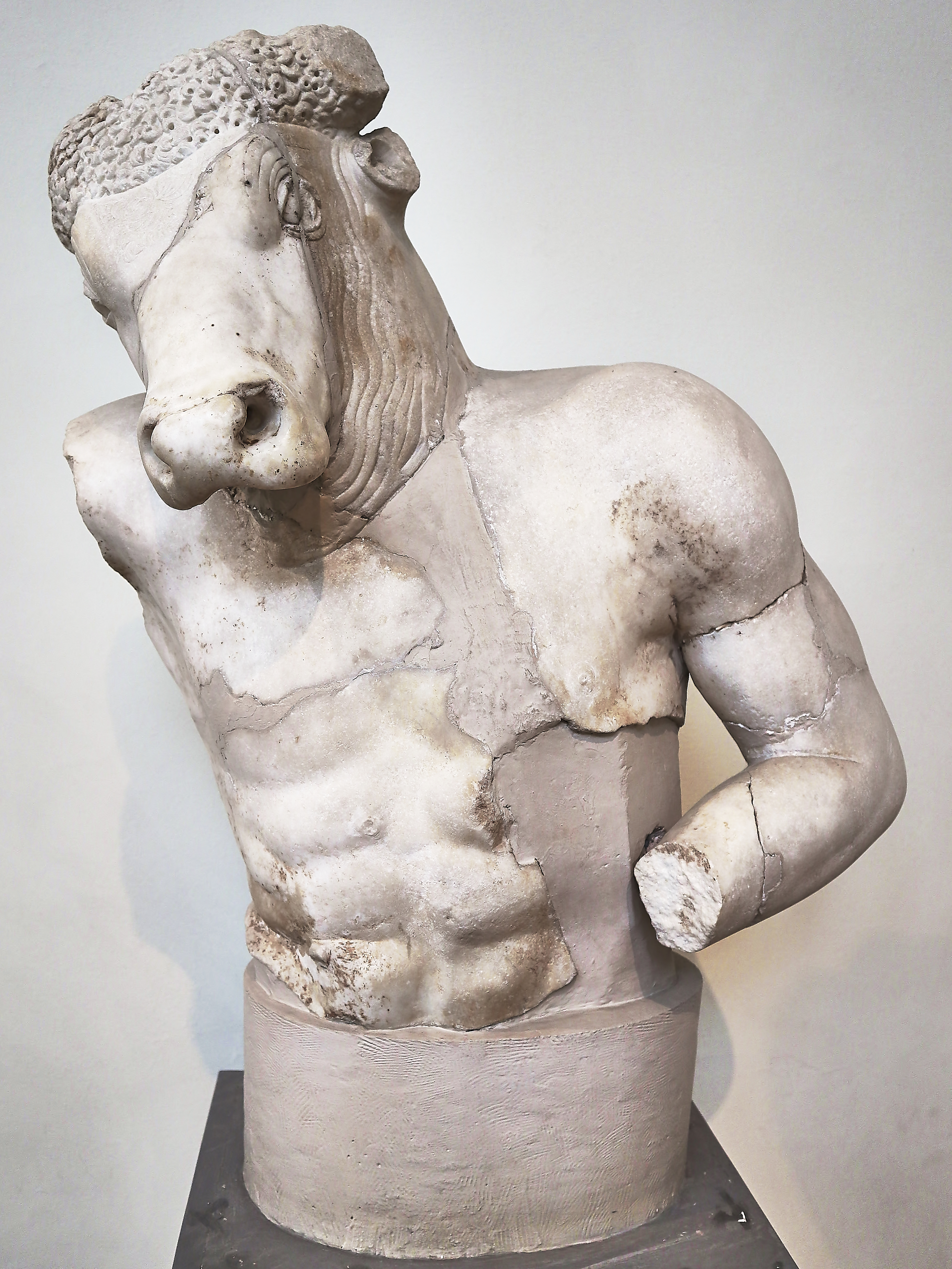
Minotaur, from a fountain in Athens, a Roman copy of Myron's lost group of Theseus and the Minotaur, National Archaeological Museum of Athens

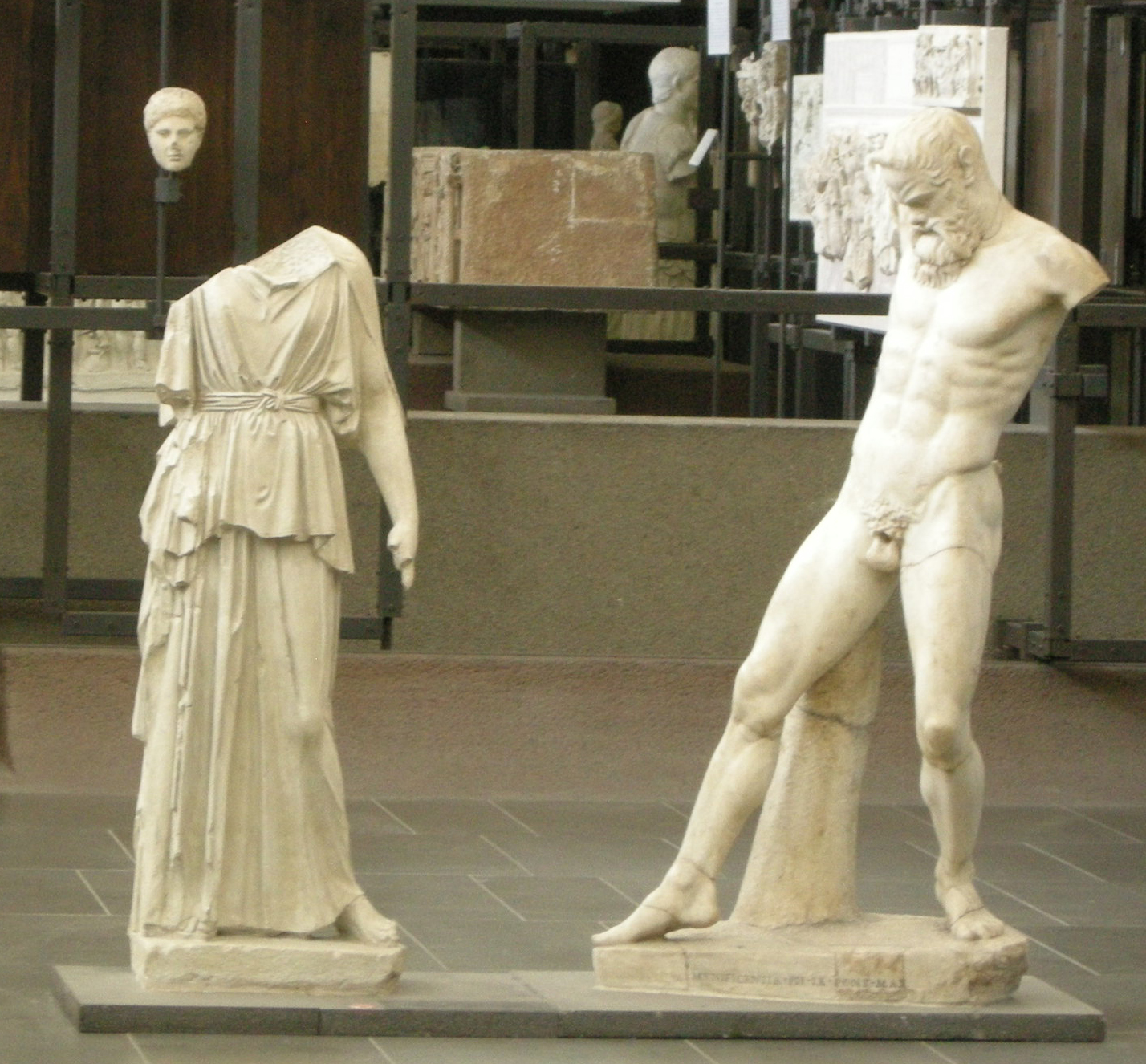
Athena and Marsyas, Roman copies, Vatican Museums

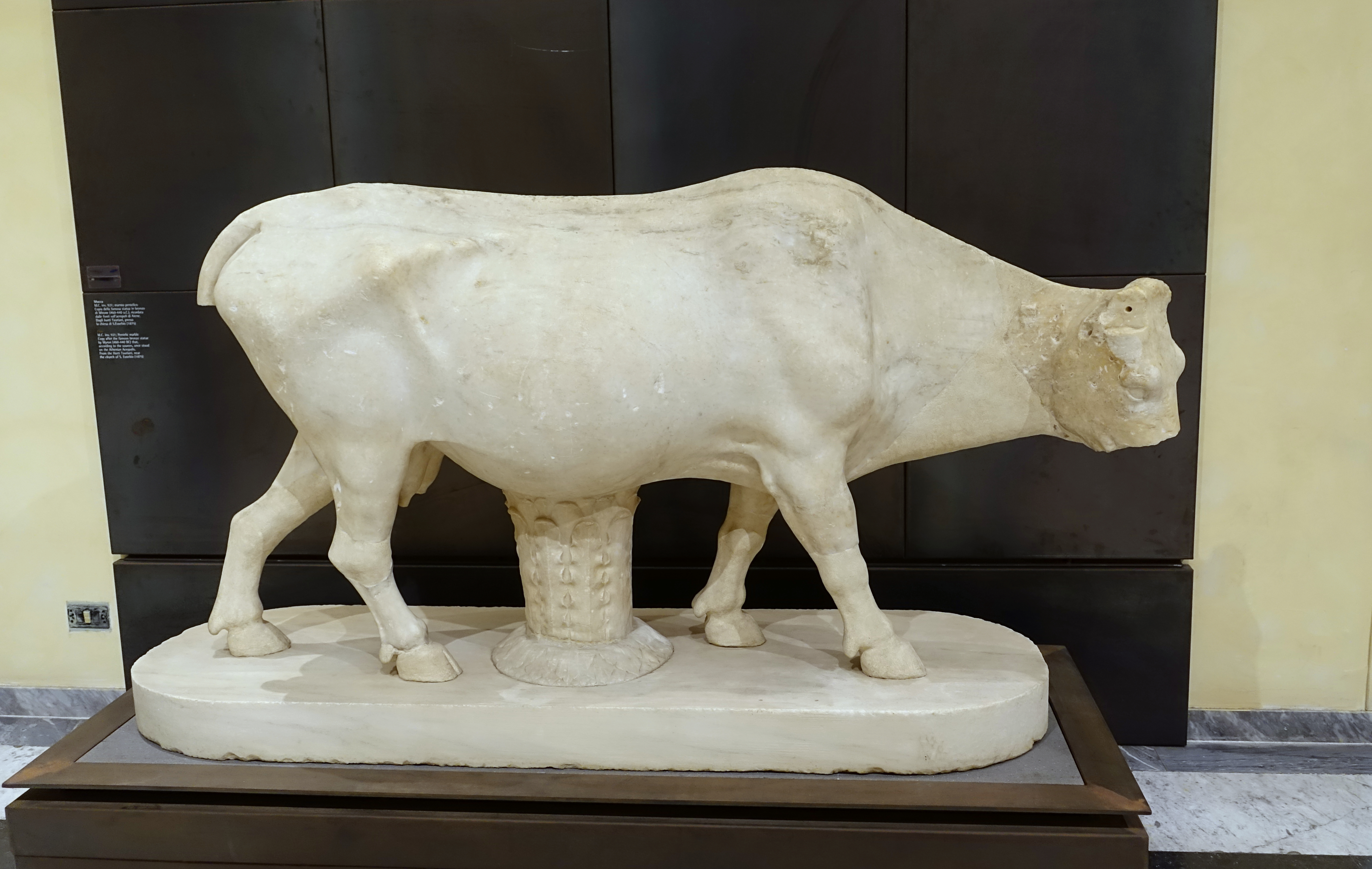
Roman copy of Myron's heifer, Capitoline Museums

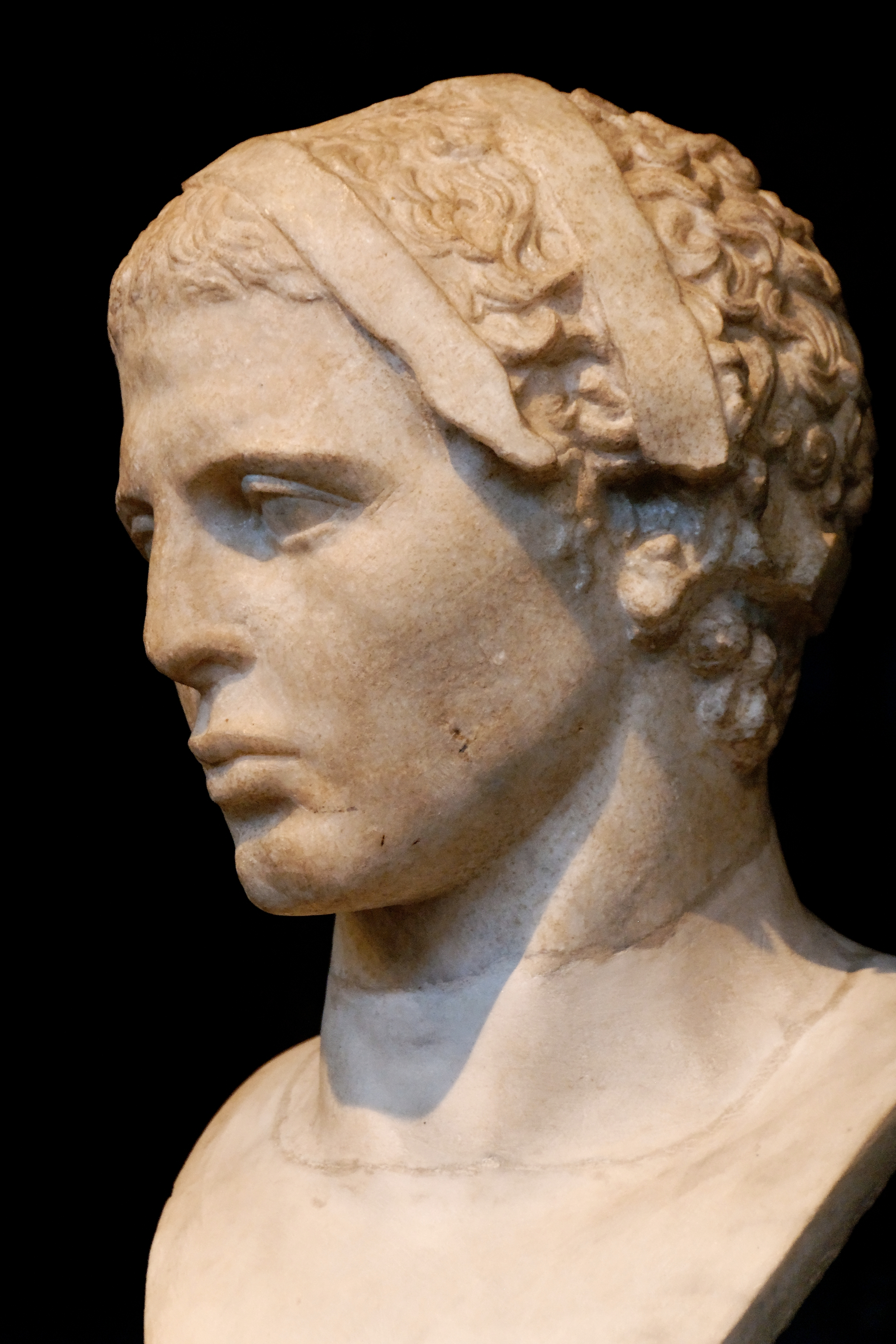
Head of a boxer, Capitoline Museums
