= Discobolus =

Sculpture by Myron

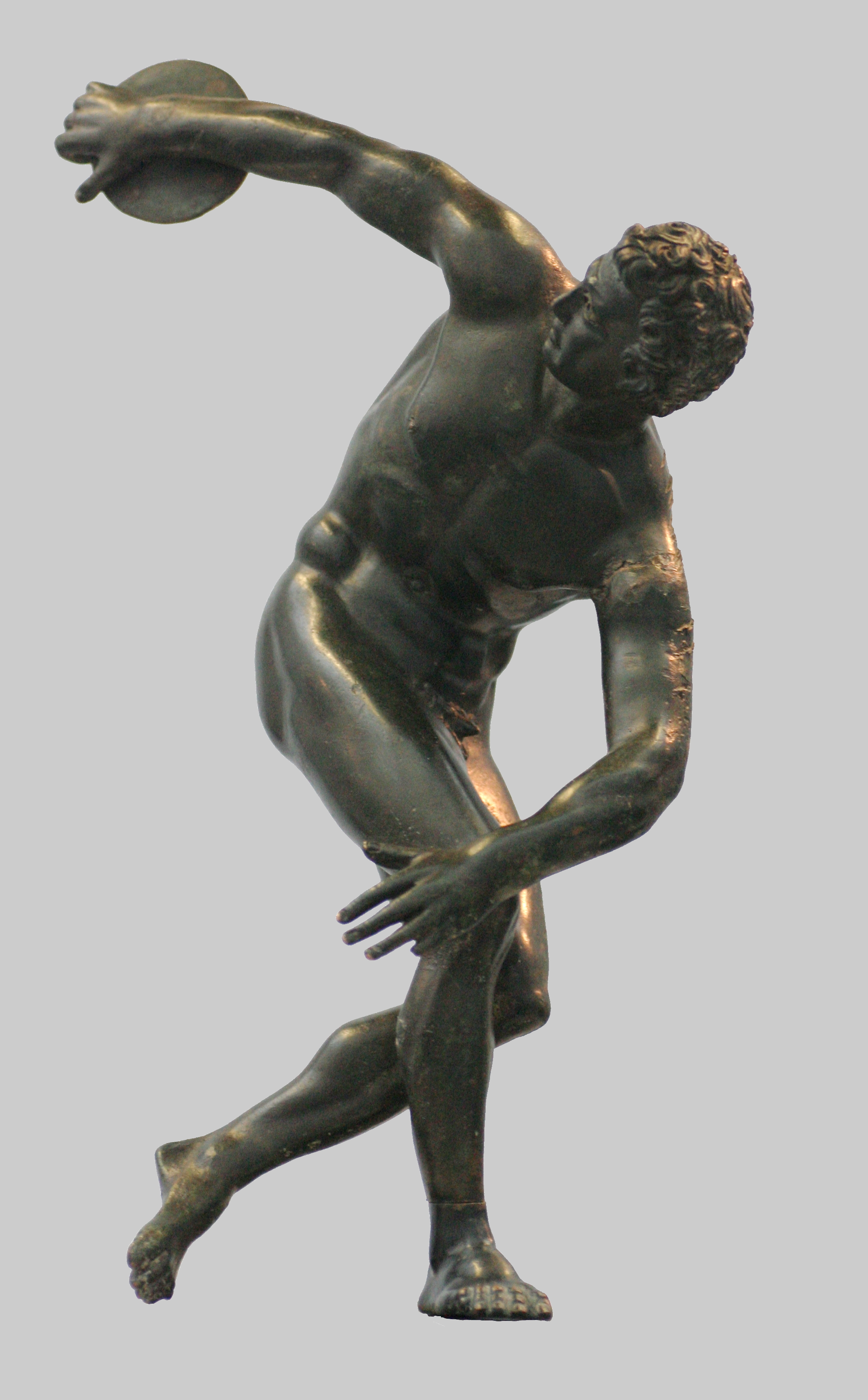
Roman bronze reproduction of Myron's Discobolus, 2nd century AD (Glyptothek, Munich)

3D model of a replica at National Gallery of Denmark, Denmark.

The Discobolus by Myron ("discus thrower", Greek: Δισκοβόλος, Diskobólos) is an ancient Greek sculpture completed at the start of the Classical period in around 460–450 BC that depicts an ancient Greek athlete throwing a discus.

Though the original Greek bronze cast is lost, the work is known through numerous surviving Roman copies. Copies are either smaller scaled in bronze or full-scale in marble, such as the Discobolus Palombara or the Townley Discobolus. The Palombara was the first to be discovered, in 1781 at the Villa Palombara on the Esquiline Hill.

A norm in Ancient Greek athletics, the Discobolus is presented nude. His pose appears unnatural to a human and is considered as per modern standards a rather inefficient way to throw the discus.

== Analysis ==
Myron's skill is evident in his ability to convey a sense of movement of the body at the moment of its maximum tension and splendor within a static medium, transforming a routine athletic activity into a representation of balance and harmony. Myron is often credited with being the first sculptor to master this style. However, the great effort of the athlete is not reflected in his facial expression, which displays only a tenuous concentration. The torso shows no muscular strain, even though the limbs are outflung. The other trademark of Myron embodied in this sculpture is how well the body is proportioned: the symmetria. The athlete's body demonstrates a sense of proportion, with meticulous attention to detail in every muscle and sinew, capturing the dynamics of a thrower's physical actions. The contrapposto stance, subtly shifting the athlete's weight from one leg to the other, imparts a semblance of motion and adds an element of realism to the artwork. The potential energy expressed in this sculpture's tightly wound pose, expressing the moment of stasis just before the release, is an example of the advancement of Classical sculpture from Archaic sculpture.

As Clark observed, "Myron has created the enduring pattern of athletic energy. He has taken a moment of action so transitory that students of athletics still debate if it is feasible, and he has given it the completeness of a cameo. To a modern eye, it may seem that Myron's desire for perfection has made him suppress too rigorously the sense of strain in the individual muscles".

The Discobolus was sculpted at a time when Greece was at the zenith of its artistic and athletic achievements. The ancient Olympic Games were not just sporting events but were deeply intertwined with Greek culture and religion. Myron's work embodies the Greek philosophy of the harmonious development of body and mind, an idea known as kalokagathia, where physical beauty and prowess were celebrated as integral components of a virtuous life.

== Reputation in the past ==
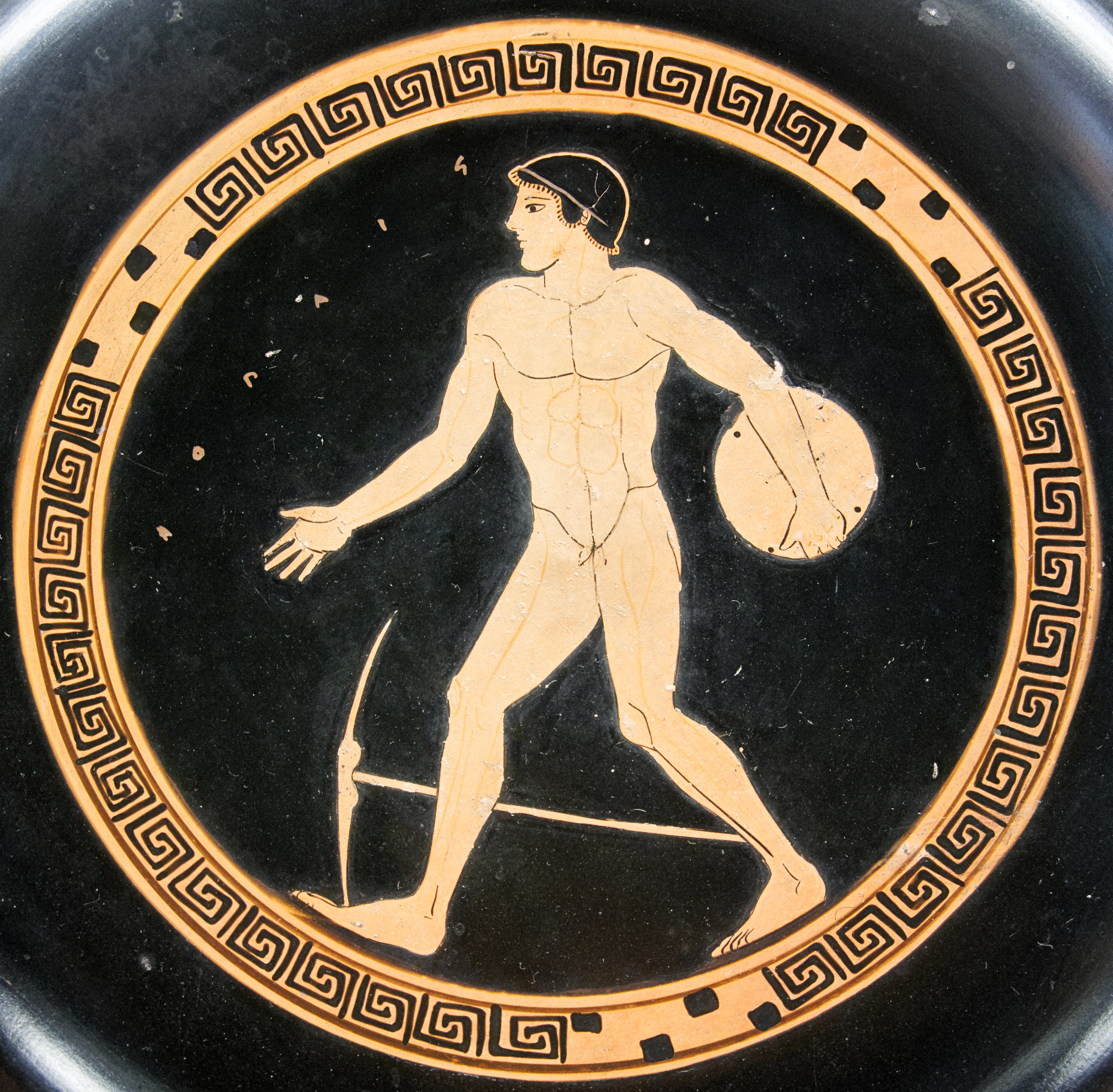
The discobolus motif on an Attic red-figured cup, c. 490 BC, is static by comparison.

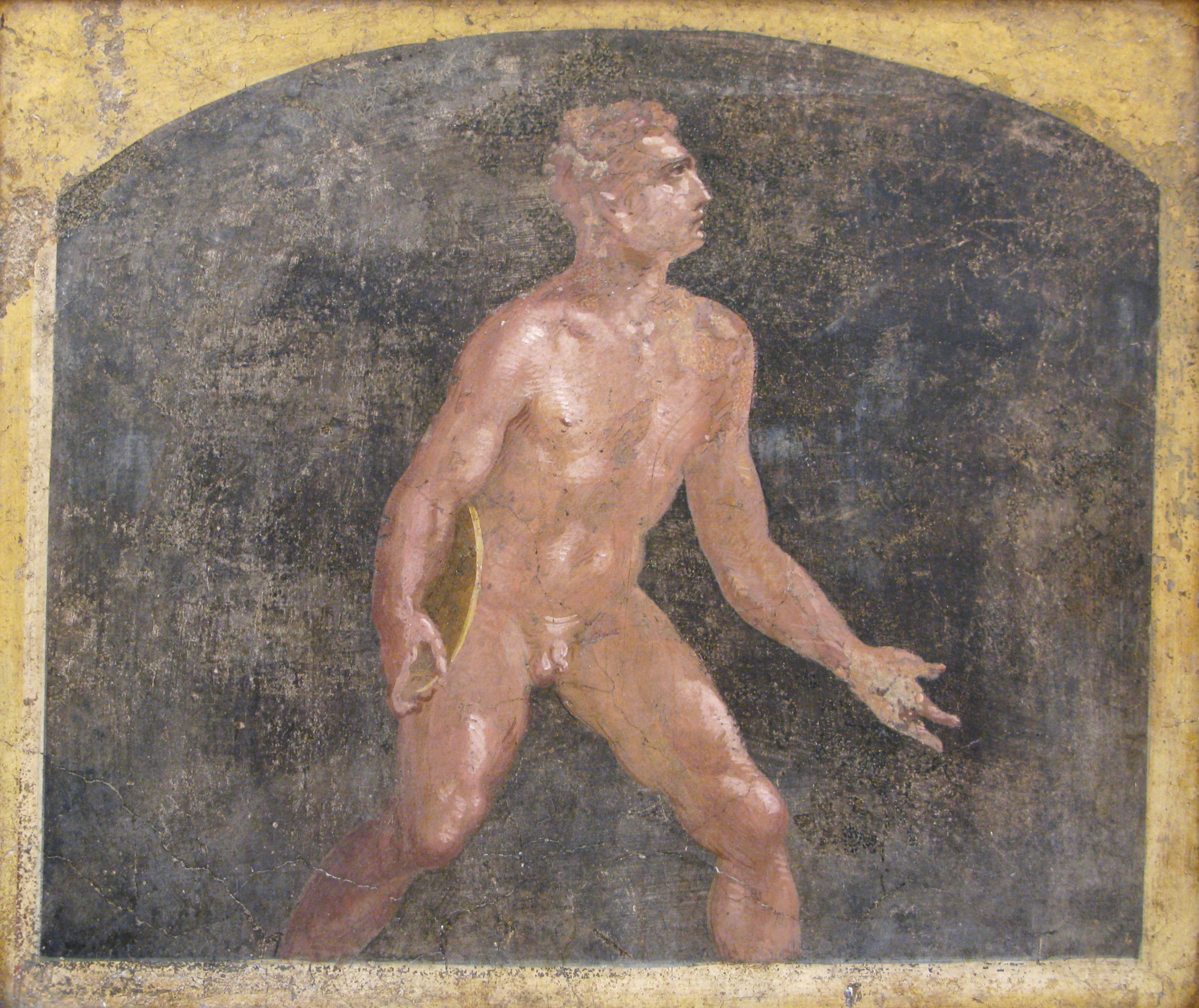
Roman discus thrower from Stabiae, Villa Arianna, 1st century AD

Myron's Discobolus was long known from descriptions, such as the dialogue in Lucian of Samosata's work Philopseudes:

When you came into the hall," he said, "didn't you notice a totally gorgeous statue up there, by Demetrios the portraitist?" "Surely you don't mean the discus-thrower," said I, "the one bent over into the throwing-position, with his head turned back to the hand that holds the discus, and the opposite knee slightly flexed, like one who will spring up again after the throw?

"Not that one," he said, "that's one of Myron's works, that Diskobolos you speak of..."

— Lucian of Samosata, Philopseudes c. 18

== Discobolus and Discophorus ==
Prior to this statue's discovery, the term Discobolus had been applied in the 17th and 18th centuries to a standing figure holding a discus, a Discophoros, which Ennio Quirino Visconti identified as the Discobolus of Naukydes of Argos, mentioned by Pliny (Haskell and Penny 1981:200).

== Copies ==
=== Discobolus Palombara or Lancellotti ===
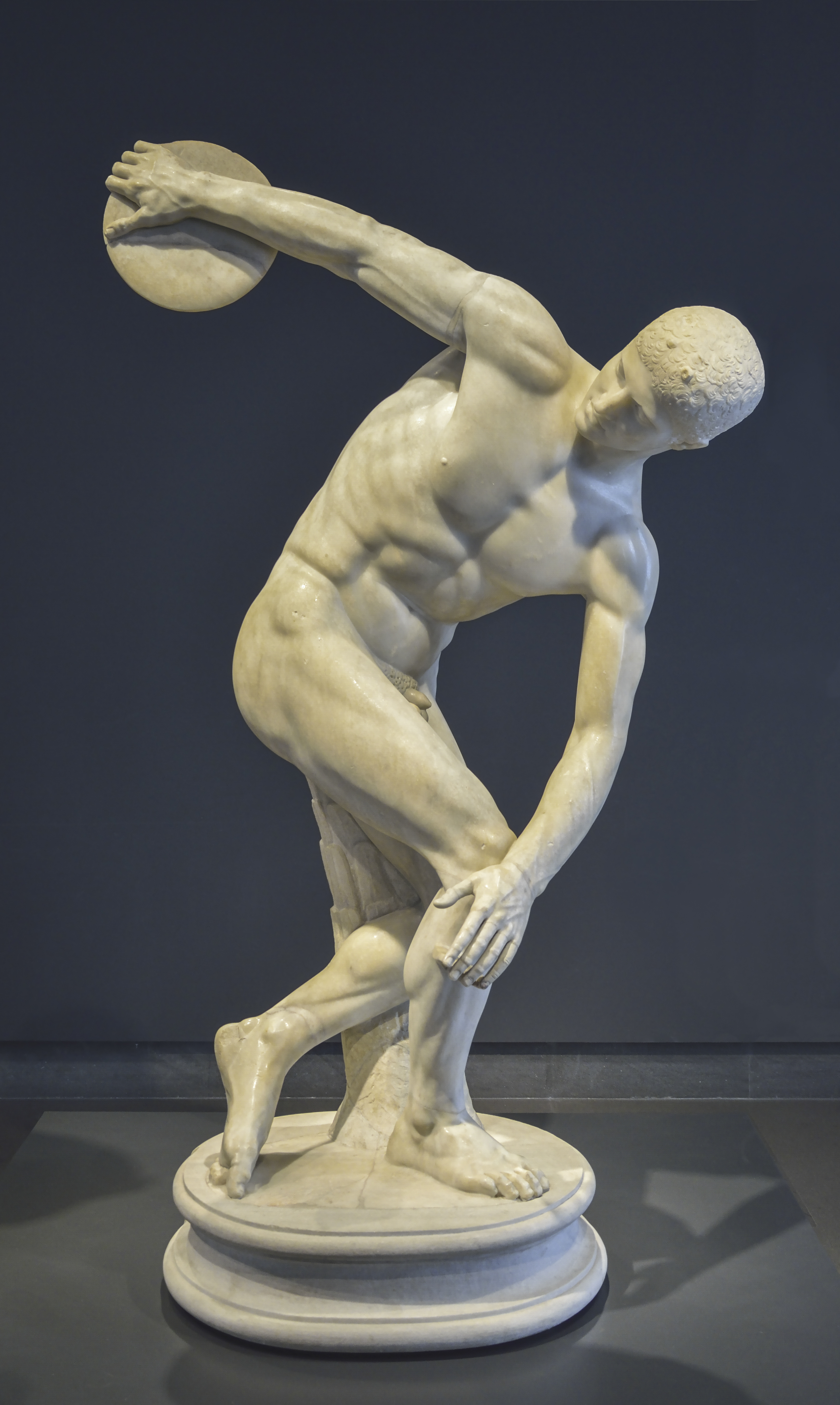
A Discobolus in the National Roman Museum in Palazzo Massimo alle Terme.

The Discobolus Palombara, the first copy of this famous sculpture to have been discovered, was found in 1781. It is a 1st-century AD copy of Myron's original bronze. Following its discovery at a Roman property of the Massimo family, the Villa Palombara on the Esquiline Hill, it was initially restored by Giuseppe Angelini; the Massimo installed it in their Palazzo Massimo alle Colonne and then at Palazzo Lancellotti. The Italian archaeologist Giovanni Battista Visconti identified the sculpture as a copy from the original of Myron. It was instantly famous, though the Massimo jealously guarded access to it (Haskell and Penny 1981:200).

In 1937, Adolf Hitler negotiated to buy it, and eventually succeeded in 1938, when Galeazzo Ciano, Minister of Foreign Affairs, sold it to him for five million lire, over the protests of Giuseppe Bottai, Minister of Education, and the scholarly community. It was shipped by rail to Munich and displayed in the Glyptothek; it was returned in 1948. It is now in the National Museum of Rome, displayed at the Palazzo Massimo.

=== Townley Discobolus ===
The Townley Discobolus under the Great Court of the British Museum, London.

After the discovery of the Discobolus Palombara a second notable Discobolus was excavated, at Hadrian's Villa in 1790, and was purchased by the English antiquary and art dealer established in Rome, Thomas Jenkins, at public auction in 1792. (Another example, also found at Tivoli at this date, was acquired by the Vatican Museums.) The English connoisseur Charles Townley paid Jenkins £400 for the statue, which arrived at the semi-public gallery Townley commissioned in Park Street, London, in 1794. The head was wrongly restored, as Richard Payne Knight soon pointed out, but Townley was convinced his was the original and better copy.

It was bought for the British Museum, with the rest of Townley's marbles, in July 1805.

=== Other copies ===
The Discobolus Castel Porziano was discovered in 1906 in the ruins of a Roman villa at Tor Paterno in the former royal estate of Castel Porziano. It is now conserved in the Museo Nazionale Romano. The Castel Porziano is fragmentary.

Other Roman copies in marble have been recovered, and torsos that were already known in the 17th century but that had been wrongly restored and completed, have since been identified as further repetitions after Myron's model. For one such example, in the early 18th century Pierre-Étienne Monnot restored a torso that is now recognized as an example of Myron's Discobolus as a Wounded Gladiator who supports himself on his arm as he sinks to the ground; the completed sculpture was donated before 1734 by Pope Clement XII to the Capitoline Museums, where it remains.

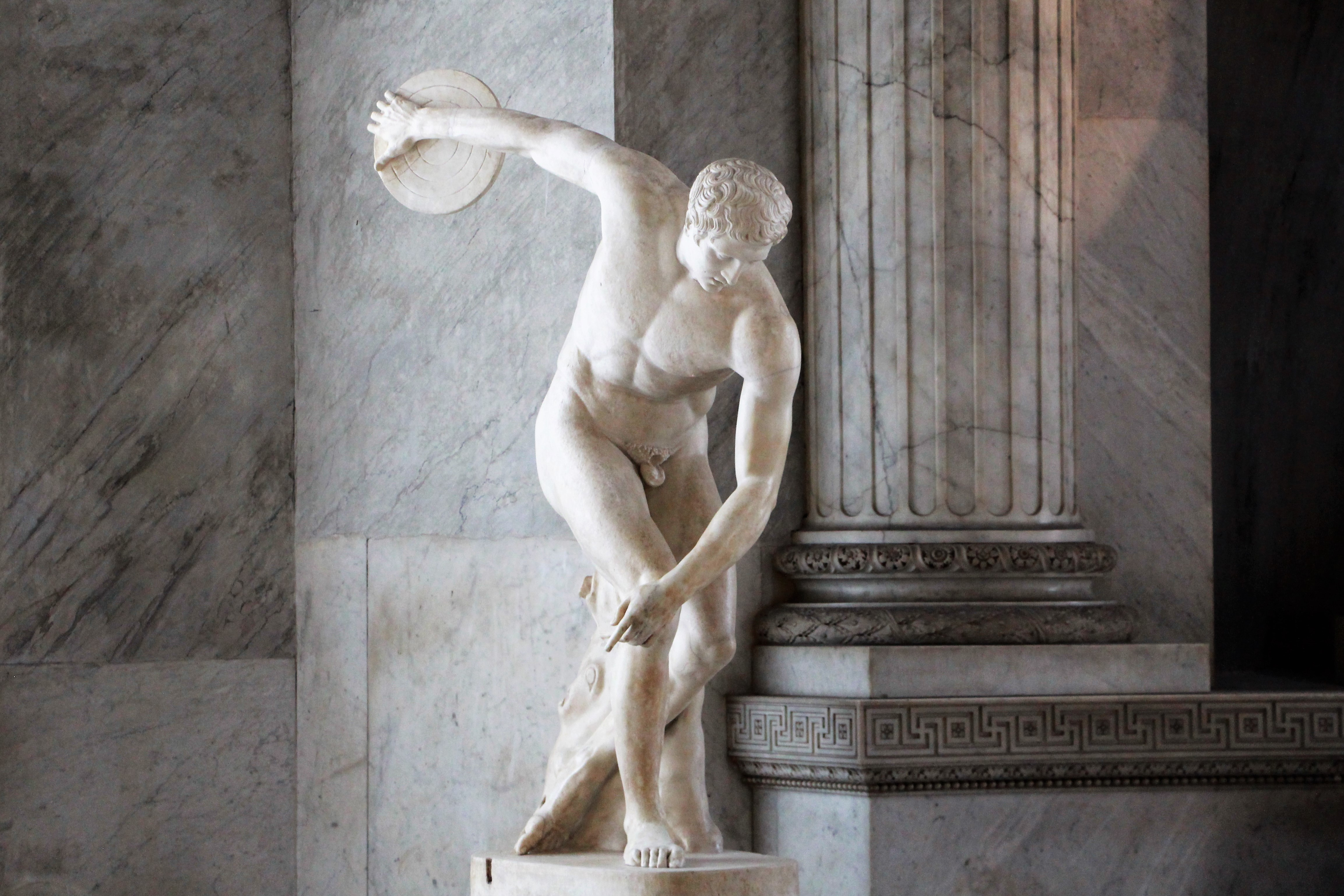
Discobolus at the Vatican Museums, Vatican City
Discobolus Castel Porziano

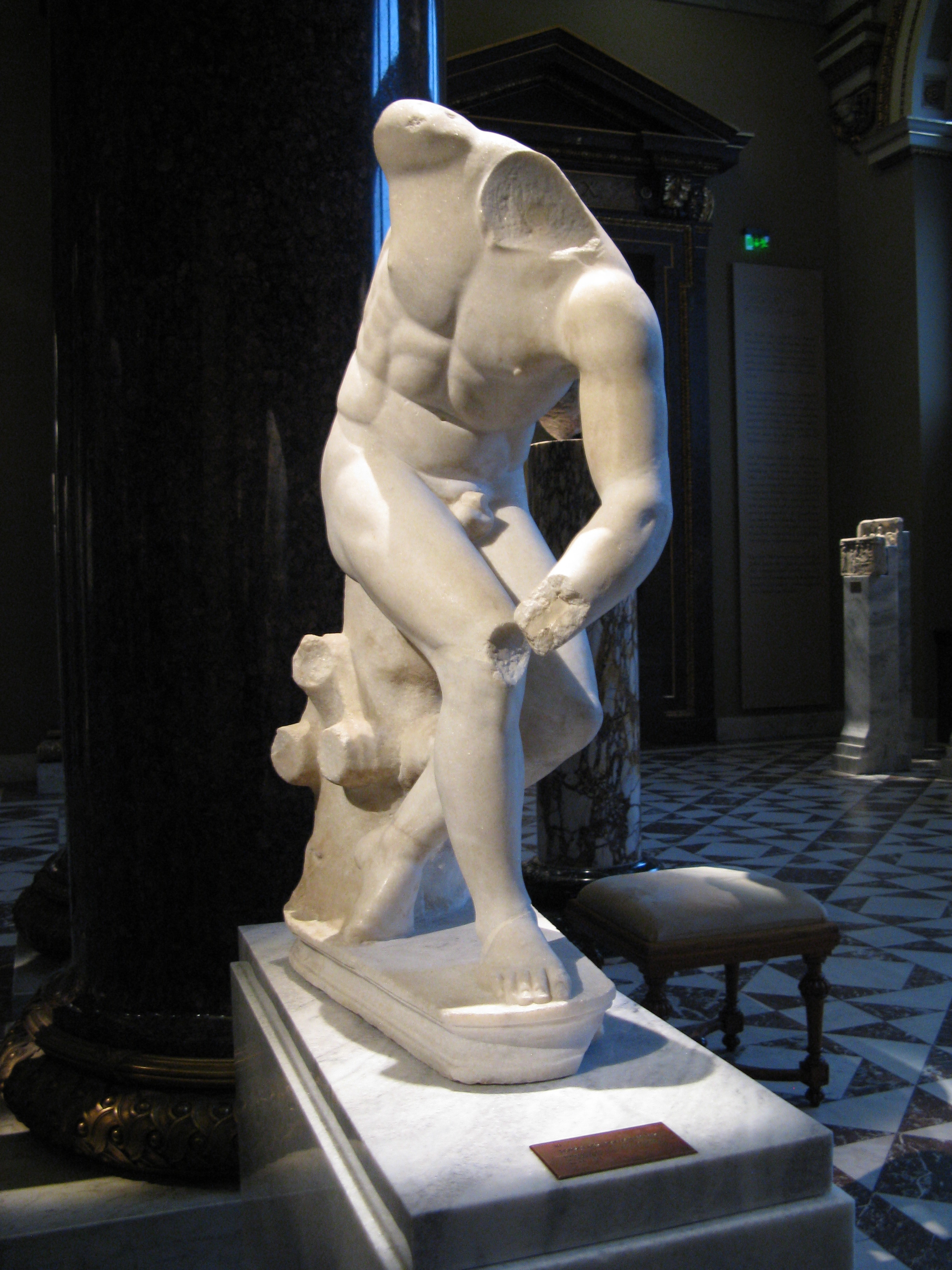
Discobolus at the Kunsthistoriches Museum, Vienna

Fragment at the Museo Barracco, Rome.

In the 19th century, plaster copies of Discobolos could be found in many large academic collections, now mostly dispersed.

Bodies: The Exhibition includes a recreation of the Discobolus. The Discus Thrower is plastinated human corpse posed like the original sculpture, discus included.

== See also ==
- Sport in ancient Greek art
- Discobolus (Harvard University)
- Discus Thrower (Washington, D.C.)
