= Antinous (disambiguation) =

Antinous (111–130 CE) was the favorite and lover of Roman Emperor Hadrian.

Antinous may also refer to:

== Arts ==
=== Literature ===
- Antinous son of Eupeithes, one of the chief suitors of Penelope in Homer's Odyssey
- Antinous, a 1918 collection of English verse by Portuguese poet Fernando Pessoa

=== Music ===
- Antinous, a 1990s composition by António Chagas Rosa

=== Sculpture ===
- Antinous Farnese, a statue of Hadrian's favorite, once owned by the Farnese family
- Antinous Mondragone, a colossal bust of Hadrian's favorite, discovered at Frascati before 1730
- Bust of Antinous (NAMA), a set of busts of Antinous discovered in Patras, Greece
- Capitoline Antinous, a statue discovered in the 18th century at Hadrian's Villa, now believed to be a Roman copy of a statue of Hermes
- Statue of Antinous (Delphi), a statue discovered in 1894 at Delphi, Greece
- Townley Antinous, a portrait head of Antinous wearing an ivy wreath

== Astronomy ==
- Antinous (constellation), an obsolete constellation, originally named by Hadrian after his favorite
- Antinous (crater), a feature of Tethys, a moon of Saturn
- 1863 Antinous, an asteroid discovered in 1948, named for the Homeric figure
- Theta Aquilae, a star also named Antinous after the constellation

== People ==
- Antinous of Epirus (died 168 BCE), a Molossian chieftain

== Ships ==
- Antinous, French renaming of the SMS Wolf (1916) of the Imperial German Navy, scrapped in 1931
- SS Antinous (1920), an American 6,000 ton merchant vessel sunk by the German submarine U-512 in 1942
- SS Antinous (1943), a Type C2 ship transferred to the United States Navy as USS Baxter (APA-94), sold in 1947 and scrapped in 1968
- SS Antinous (1944), a Type C2 ship scrapped in 1970
