= Charops of Epirus =

Charops or Charopus is the name of two statesmen in 2nd century BC of the Epirote League, grandfather and grandson; both of them had the patronymic Machatas.

The grandfather sided with the Romans in their war with Philip V of Macedon, and, by sending a shepherd to guide a portion of the Roman army over the heights above the position of the Macedonians, enabled Flamininus to dislodge Philip from the defile which he had occupied in Epirus in 198 BC. In 192 BC, Charops was sent by his countrymen on an embassy to Antiochus the Great, who was wintering at Chalcis in Euboea. He represented to the king that the Epirotes were more exposed to the attacks of the Romans than any of the inhabitants of the rest of Greece, and begged him therefore to excuse them from siding with him unless he felt himself strong enough to protect them. He continued to the end of his life to cultivate the friendship of the Romans, and sent his grandson Charops to Rome for education after his son Machatas died.

The grandson received his education at Rome, and after his return to his own country adhered to the Roman cause; but here ends all resemblance between himself and his grandfather. It was this younger Charops by whose calumnies Antinous and Caphalus were driven in self-defence to take the side of Perseus; and he was again one of those who flocked from the several states of Greece to Aemilius Paullus at Amphipolis, in 167 BC, to congratulate him on the decisive victory at Pydna in the preceding year, and who seized the opportunity to rid themselves of the most formidable of their political opponents by pointing them out as friends of Macedonia, and so causing them to be apprehended and sent to Rome. The power thus obtained Charops in particular so barbarously abused, that Polybius has recorded his belief that there never had been before and never would be again a greater monster of cruelty. But even his cruelty did not surpass his rapacity and extortion, in which he was fully aided and seconded by his mother, Philotis (or Philota). His proceedings, however, were discountenanced at Rome, and when he went thither to obtain the senate's confirmation of his iniquity, he not only received from them an unfavourable and threatening answer, but the chieftains of the state, and Aemilius Paullus among the number, refused to receive him into their houses. Yet on his return to Epirus he had the audacity to falsify the senate's sentence. The year 157 BC is commemorated by Polybius as one in which Greece was purged of many of her plagues: as an instance of this, he mentions the death of Charops at Brundisium.

Alkemachos, son of the elder Charops, was a winner in diaulos (~400-metre race) in Panathenaics 190/189 BC. Demetrius, son of Machatas and brother of Charops the elder was in the service of Ptolemy V Epiphanes. The family belonged to the tribe of Thesprotians.
