= Bust of Antinous (NAMA) =

Bust of Antinous in Athens, Greece

- Greek: Προτομή του Αντίνοου
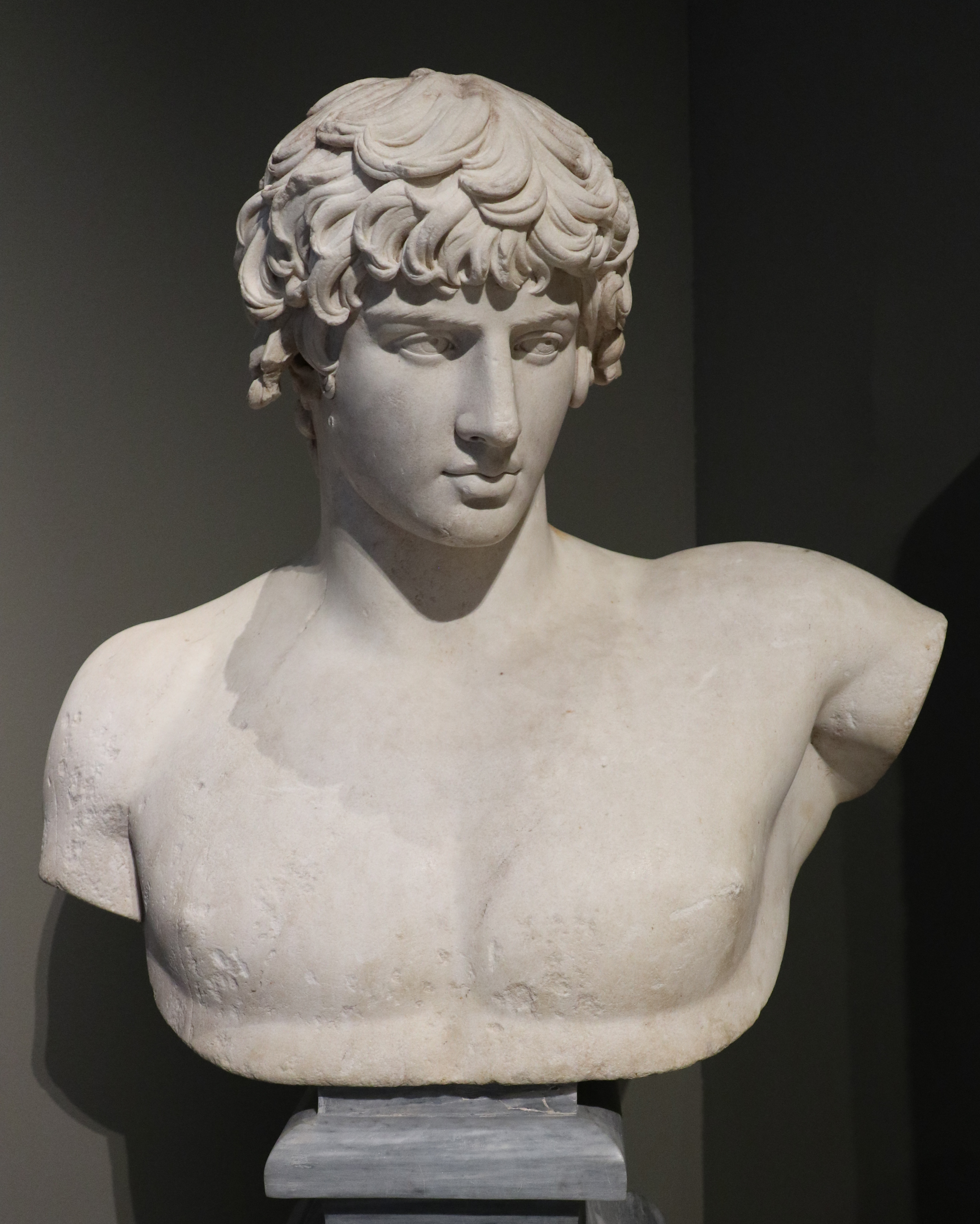
- The bust of Antinous
- Year: 2nd century AD
- Medium: Marble sculpture
- Subject: Antinous
- Dimensions: 67 cm (26 in)
- Location: National Archaeological Museum, Athens

The bust of Antinous (Greek: Προτομή του Αντίνοου) in the National Archaeological Museum, Athens in Greece is an ancient Roman sculptural portrait of the young Antinous, the favorite and beloved of the Roman emperor Hadrian. It was discovered in the city of Patras in the nineteenth century.

== Description ==
This bust of Antinous, categorized as item inv. no. 417, was excavated in Patras in 1856, a few decades after Greece's independence. It was found alongside a second, almost identical, bust of Antinous which is also kept in the National Archaeological Museum of Athens (inv. no. 418). Both busts show typical features of Antinous's iconography, such as full lips, luscious curls, a broad chest, a straight nose, thick eyebrows and a melancholic expression, and were produced around 130–138 AD from the same workshop, not long after Antinous's death in 130 AD. The second bust however is more damaged than the other, with clear damage in its nose, cheek and chin.

The first, undamaged bust is exhibited in room 31a of the museum, while the second is usually kept in storage, though it was displayed for some time during the Hadrian and Antinous: an encounter, 19 centuries later exhibition in 2018. It is 67cm in height, and made of marble from the Aegean island of Thasos.

== Gallery ==
Bust of Antinous

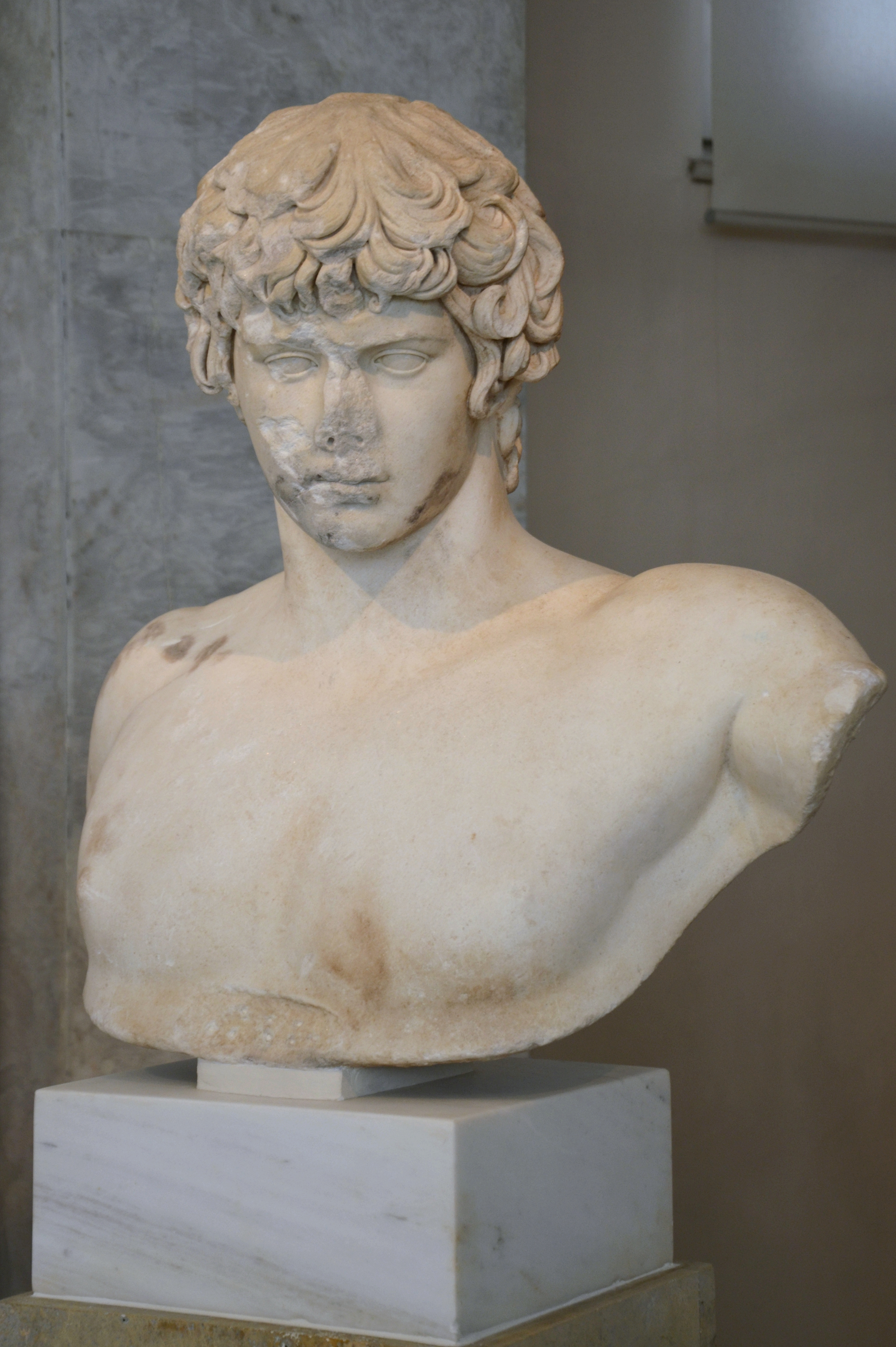
The second, damaged bust in exhibition.

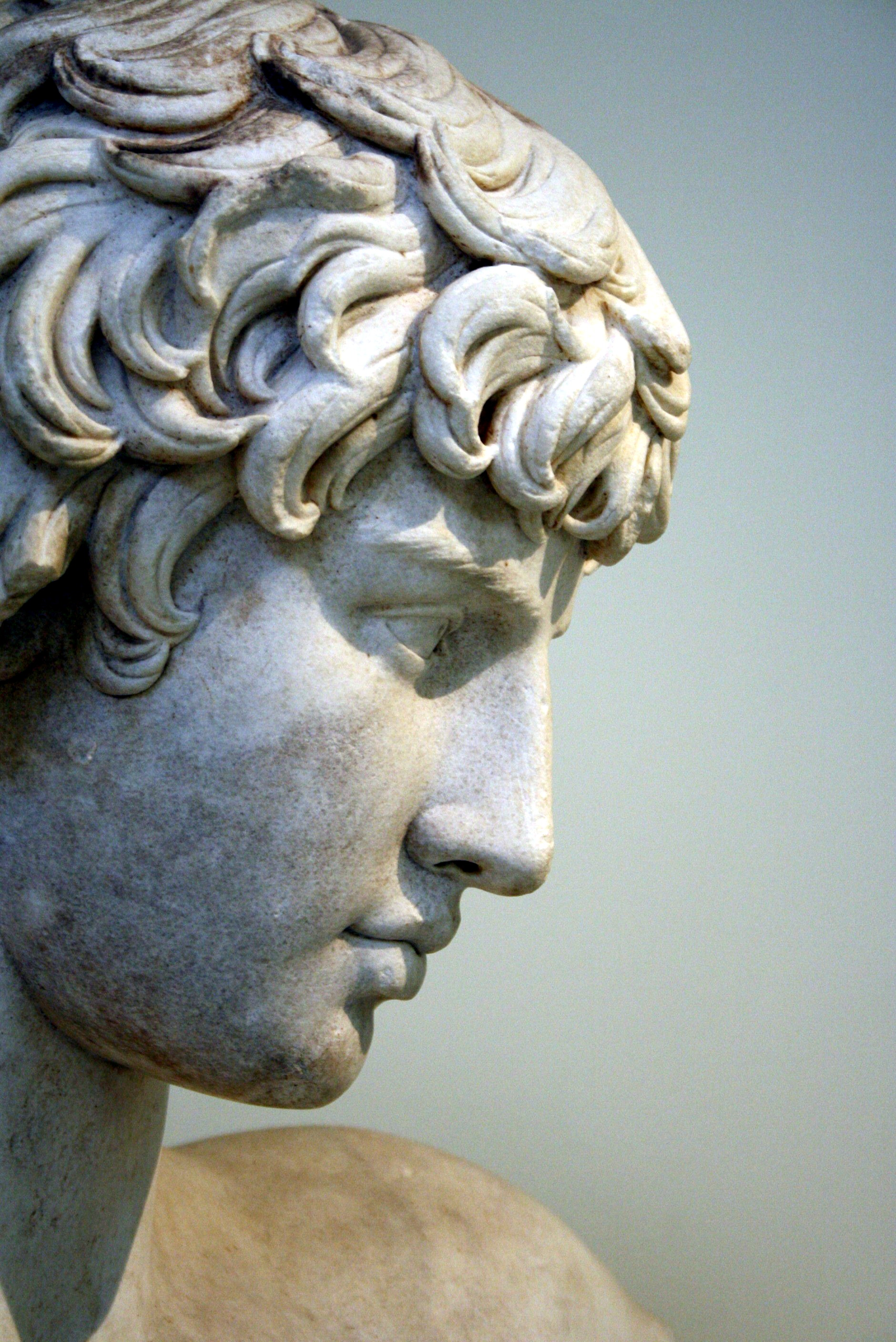
The bust from right side.

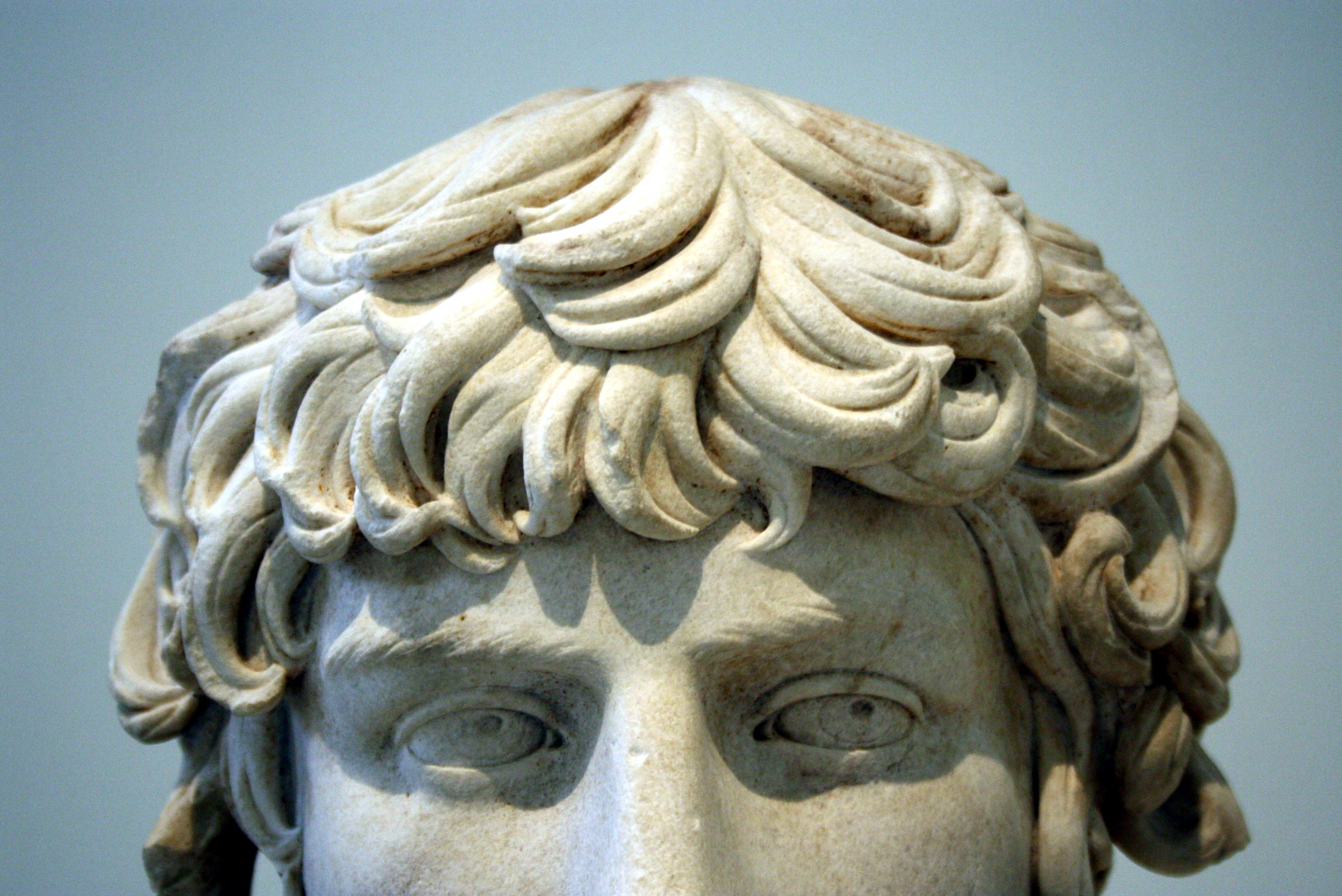
Eyes and hair.

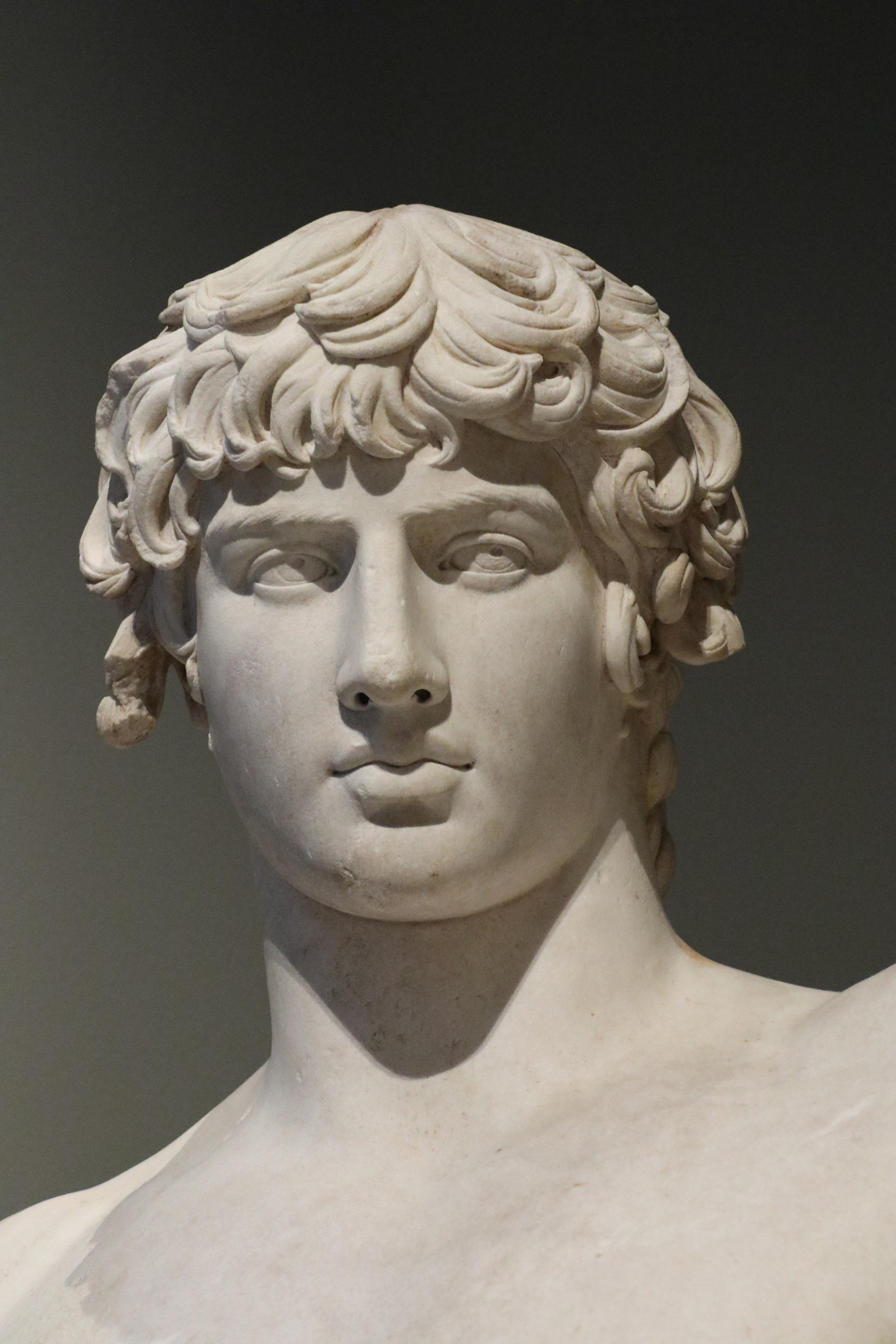
Frontal.

== See also ==
- Varvakeion Athena
- Mask of Agamemnon
- Statue of Antinous (Delphi)
