= Capitoline Antinous =

Marble male nude statue found at Hadrian's Villa

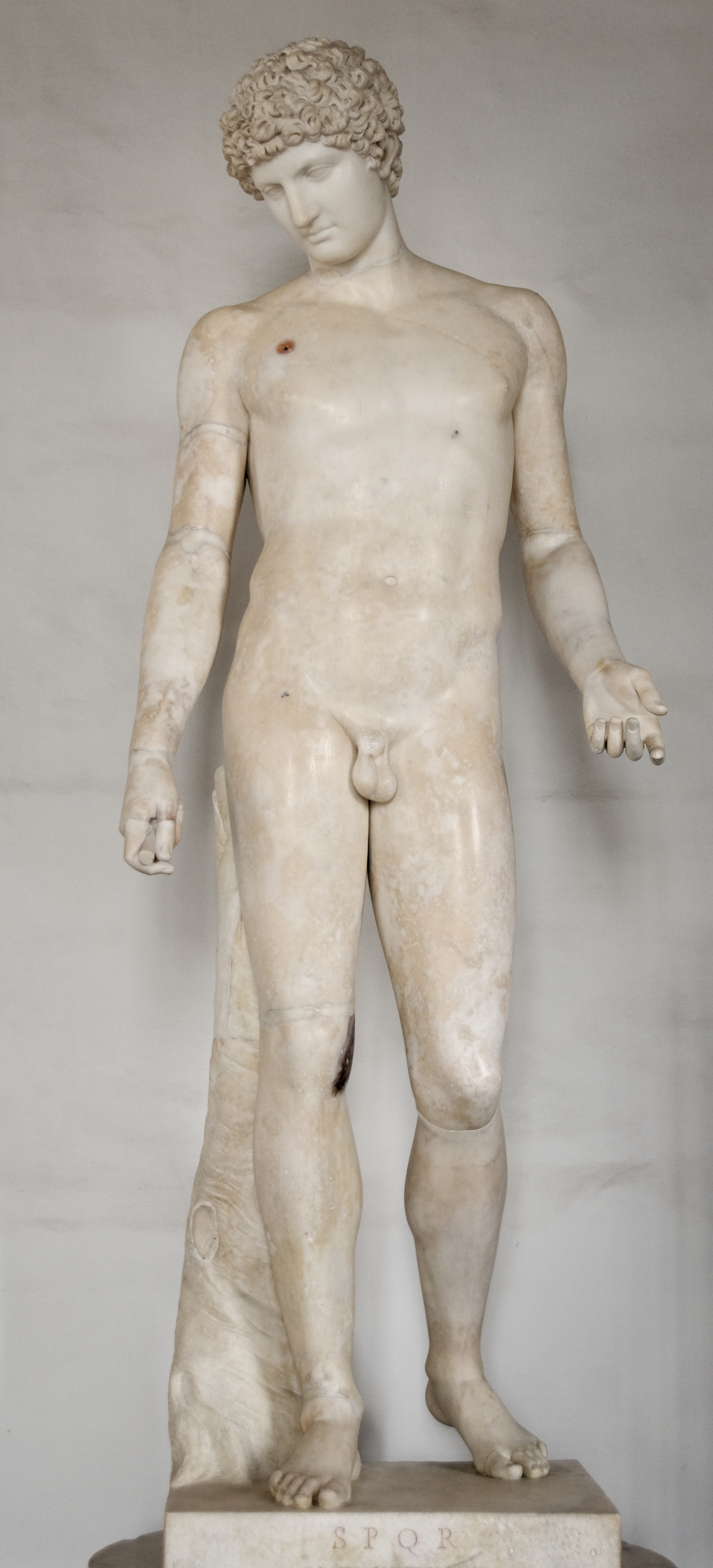
The Capitoline Antinous

The Capitoline 'Antinous' is a marble statue of a young nude male found at Hadrian's Villa, Tivoli, during the time when Conte Giuseppe Fede was undertaking the earliest concerted excavations there. It was bought before 1733 by Alessandro Cardinal Albani. To contemporaries it seemed to be the real attraction of his collection. The statue was bought by Pope Clement XII in 1733 and went on to form the nucleus of the Capitoline Museums, Rome, where it remains. The restored left leg and the left arm, with its unexpected rhetorical hand gesture, were provided by Pietro Bracci. In the 18th century it was considered to be one of the most beautiful Roman copies of a Greek statue in the world. It was then thought to represent Hadrian's lover Antinous owing to its fleshy face and physique and downturned look. It was part of the artistic loot taken to Paris under the terms of the Treaty of Tolentino (1797) and remained in Paris 1800–15, when it was returned to Rome after the fall of Napoleon.

In part due to its hair being unlike that in better-attested Antinous-types, which closely follow a very few iconographic models, it is now considered to be a Roman Imperial era copy of an early 4th century BC Greek statue of Hermes. Such a change of identification was already underway before 1900, when Augustus Hare observed in his Walks in Rome that:

[the statue's] identity has only once, I think, been seriously challenged; and yet it may be reckoned more than doubtful. The head is almost certainly not [Antinous's]. How it came to be placed upon a body presenting so much resemblance to the type of Antinous, I do not know. Careful comparison of the torso and the arms will even raise the question whether this fine statue is not a Hermes or a hero of an earlier age [than Antinous].

== See also ==
- Antinous Farnese
- Antinous Mondragone
- Statue of Antinous (Delphi)
- Townley Antinous
