= Townley Hadrian =

Bust of Roman emperor

Bust of Hadrian
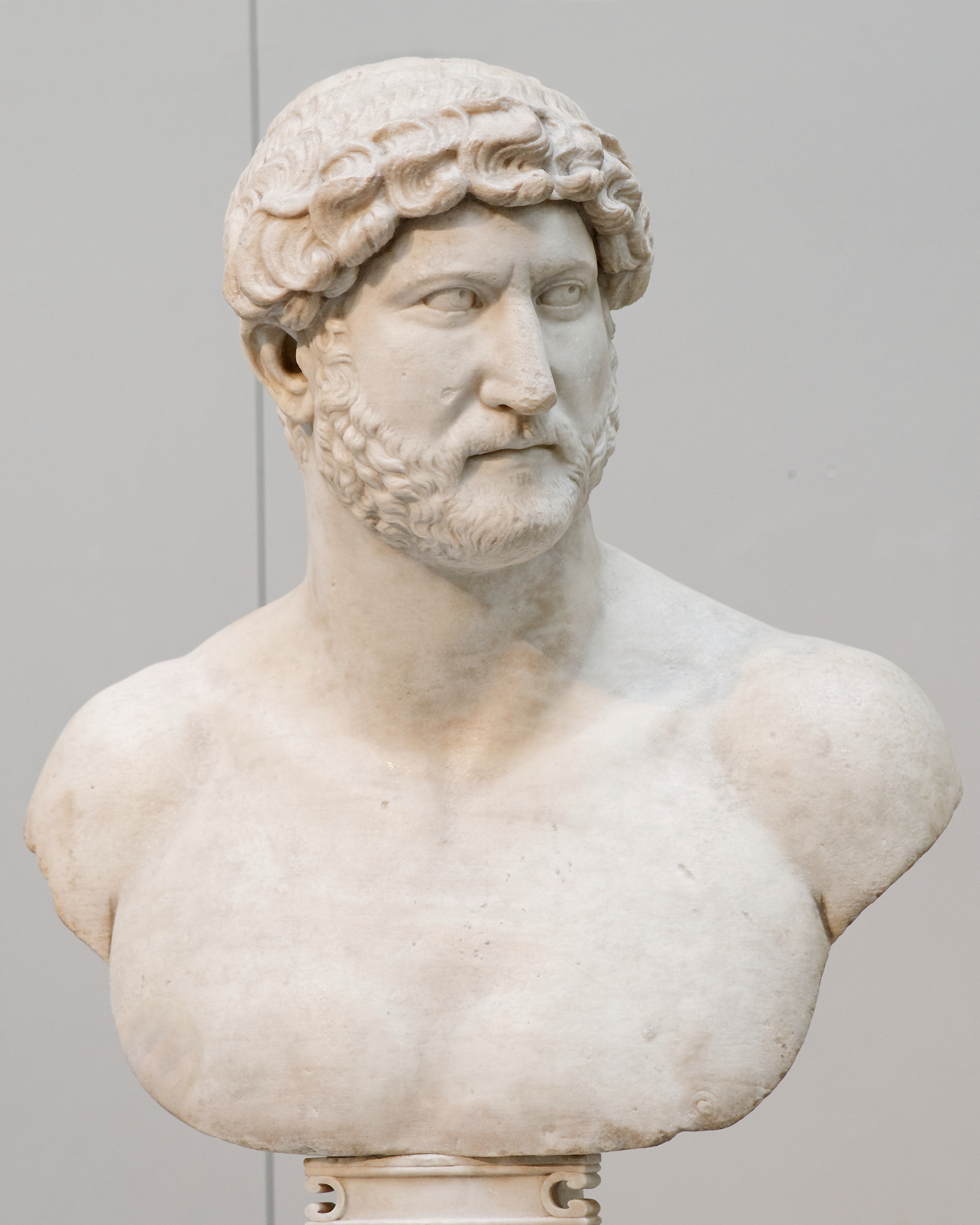
- Medium: Marble sculpture
- Subject: Hadrian
- Location: British Museum; London, United Kingdom

A bust of Hadrian (r. 117 – 138 AD), the second-century Roman emperor who rebuilt the Pantheon and constructed the Temple of Venus and Roma, was formerly displayed in Pope Sixtus V's Villa Montalto and is now displayed at the British Museum in London. The bust is one of the Townley Marbles collected by Charles Townley (1737–1805) and sold by his heir Peregrine Edward Towneley at a reduced price to the British Museum in 1805. Unlike most busts of Hadrian and other emperors, it shows him in heroic nudity. The bust was found in Rome and is carved from Greek marble.

== Description and history ==
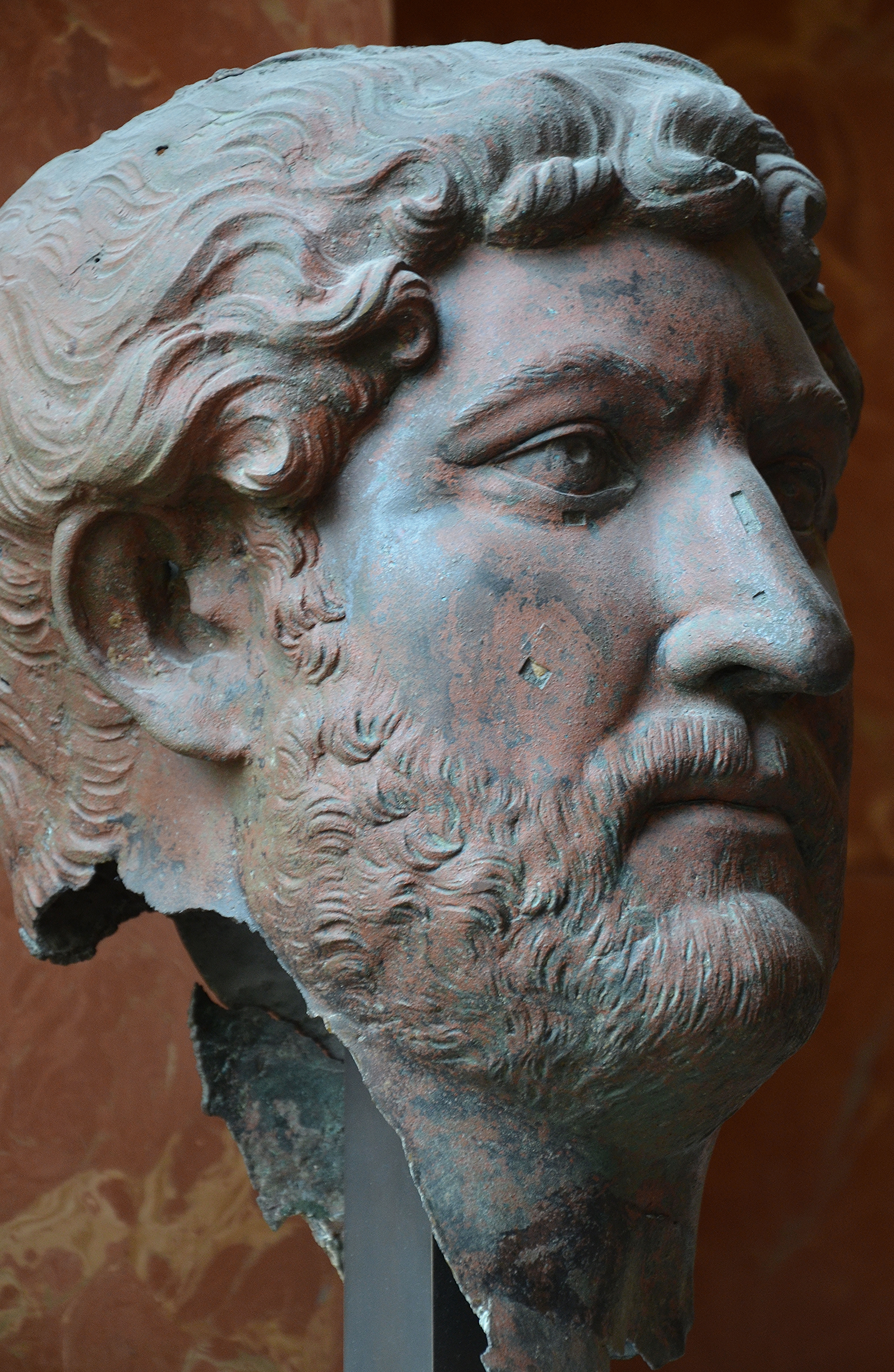
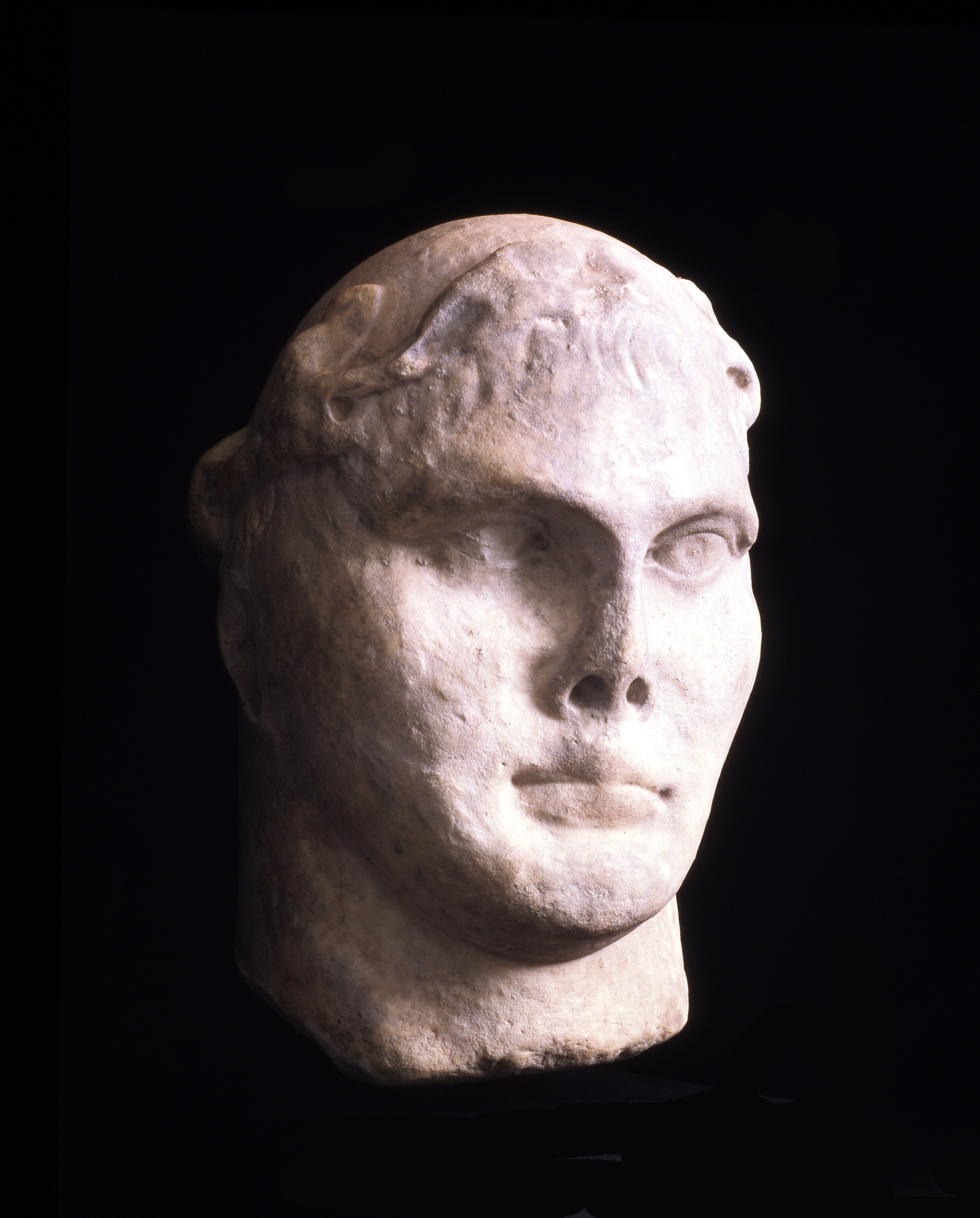
- Left: Head of Hadrian (Louvre)
- Right: Head of Constantine the Great (Yorkshire Museum)

The Townley bust is comparable with a bronze head of Hadrian in the Louvre. The type is characterized by an elaborate hairstyle of thick curls combed forwards. Both the marble bust and the bronze head have features similar to the marble Head of Constantine the Great (r. 306–337) found on Stonegate, a street in York above the ancient via praetoria thoroughfare of the castra at Eboracum, garrison of the VI Victrix Roman legion from Hadrian's reign. It is likely that the York and Louvre heads were images of Hadrian contemporary with the Townley bust, with the York example having been re-carved with the image of Constantine wearing a corona civica after the Battle of the Milvian Bridge.

The Townley bust, like other genuine statues of Hadrian, portrays his distinctively creased earlobes. It has been suggested from these that Hadrian suffered from, and eventually died from, coronary artery disease.

Charles Townley acquired the bust for £105 in March 1795 from Barwell Brown, the son of the antiquary and art dealer Lyde Browne, together with a veiled statue head of Adonis. He paid £168 for the pair, including transport from Livorno, in March the following year, as well as £8/6 (5%) interest on the delay. Townley annotated his copy of the work of Ennio Quirino Visconti listing the portraits of Hadrian, indicating that he was in possession of this example.

At the British Museum's exhibition on Hadrian: Empire and Conflict in 2008, the bust was included in one of two galleries of busts representing distinct phases in Hadrian's life, one earlier and dominated by the women of the Nerva–Trajan dynasty, the later without female portraits. In the exhibition the Townley bust appeared in the earlier group, arranged together with busts of Hadrian's Vibia Sabina, mother-in-law Salonia Matidia, and grandmother-in-law Ulpia Marciana alongside busts of Marciana's brother, Hadrian's predecessor emperor Trajan (r. 98–117) and his own wife Plotina. Trajan and Hadrian were provincial Romans from Italica in Hispania Baetica on the Iberian Peninsula. The exhibition layout alluded to the rumour that Plotina had arranged Hadrian's rise to power.

The bust has since been displayed alongside a bust of Antinous, Hadrian's lover from Bithynia, an arrangement commented on by Janina Ramirez in the 2020 BBC Four documentary Museums in Quarantine. Unlike Hadrian, sculptures of Antinous are more often than not nude.

== Exhibition history ==
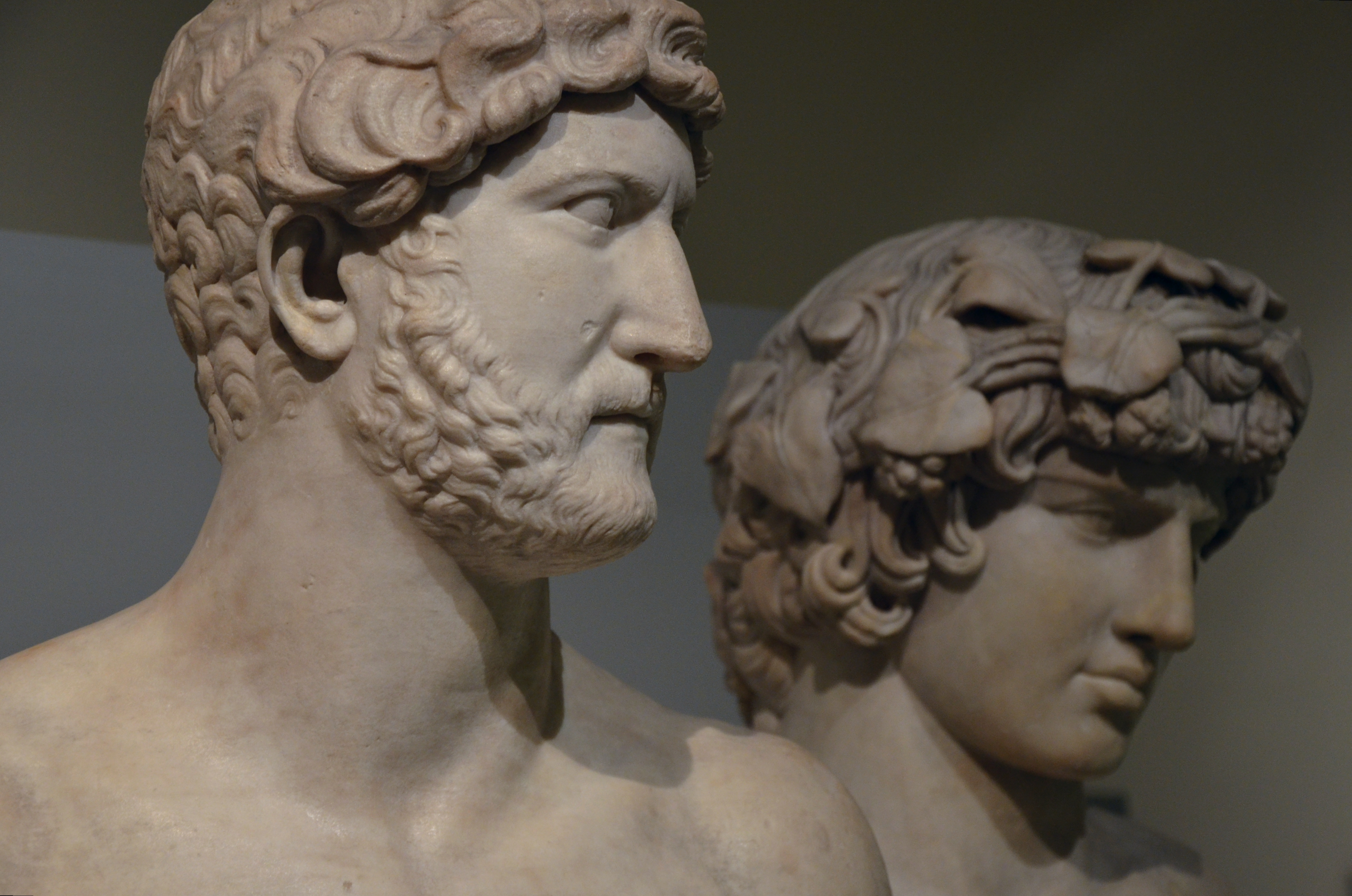
The bust displayed with a bust of Antinous in the British Museum, 2015

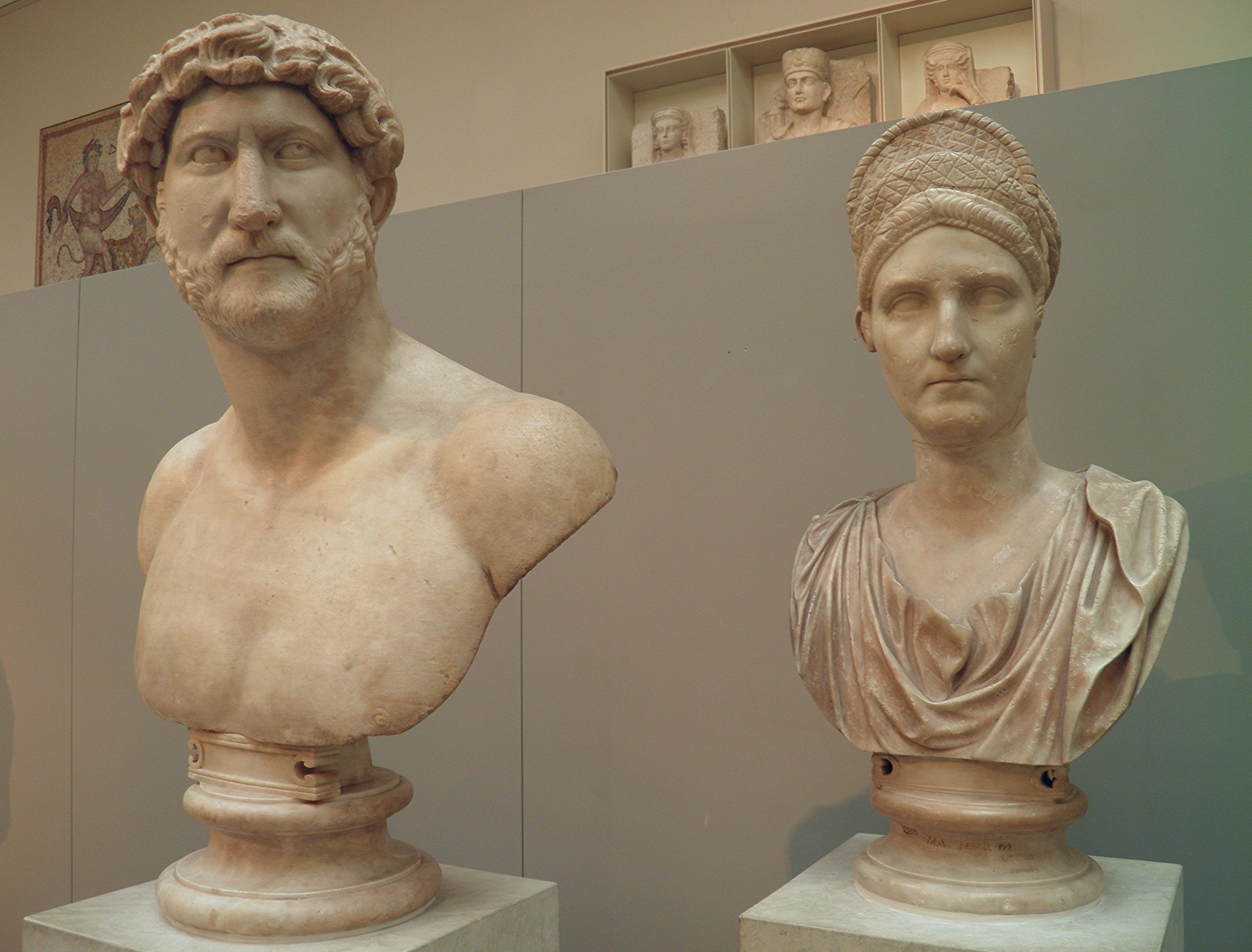
The bust next to one of his second cousin and mother-in-law Salonia Matidia in the British Museum, 2013

Following is an overview of the work's exhibition history:

- 11 April – 10 July 2005, Seoul Arts Center, Treasures of the World's Cultures
- 25 July – 8 October 2005, Busan Museum, Treasures of the World's Cultures
- 27 October 2005 – 31 January 2006, Hengso Museum, Keimyung University, Daegu, Treasures of the World's Cultures
- 18 March – 4 June 2006, Beijing, Capital Museum, Treasures of the World's Cultures
- 3 February – 27 May 2007, Taipei, National Palace Museum, Treasures of the World's Cultures
- 14 September – 2 December, Hong Kong Museum of Art, Treasures of the World's Cultures
- July 24 – 26 August 2008, London, British Museum, 'Hadrian: Empire and Conflict'
