= Townley Antinous =

Bust of Antinous

Bust of Antinous
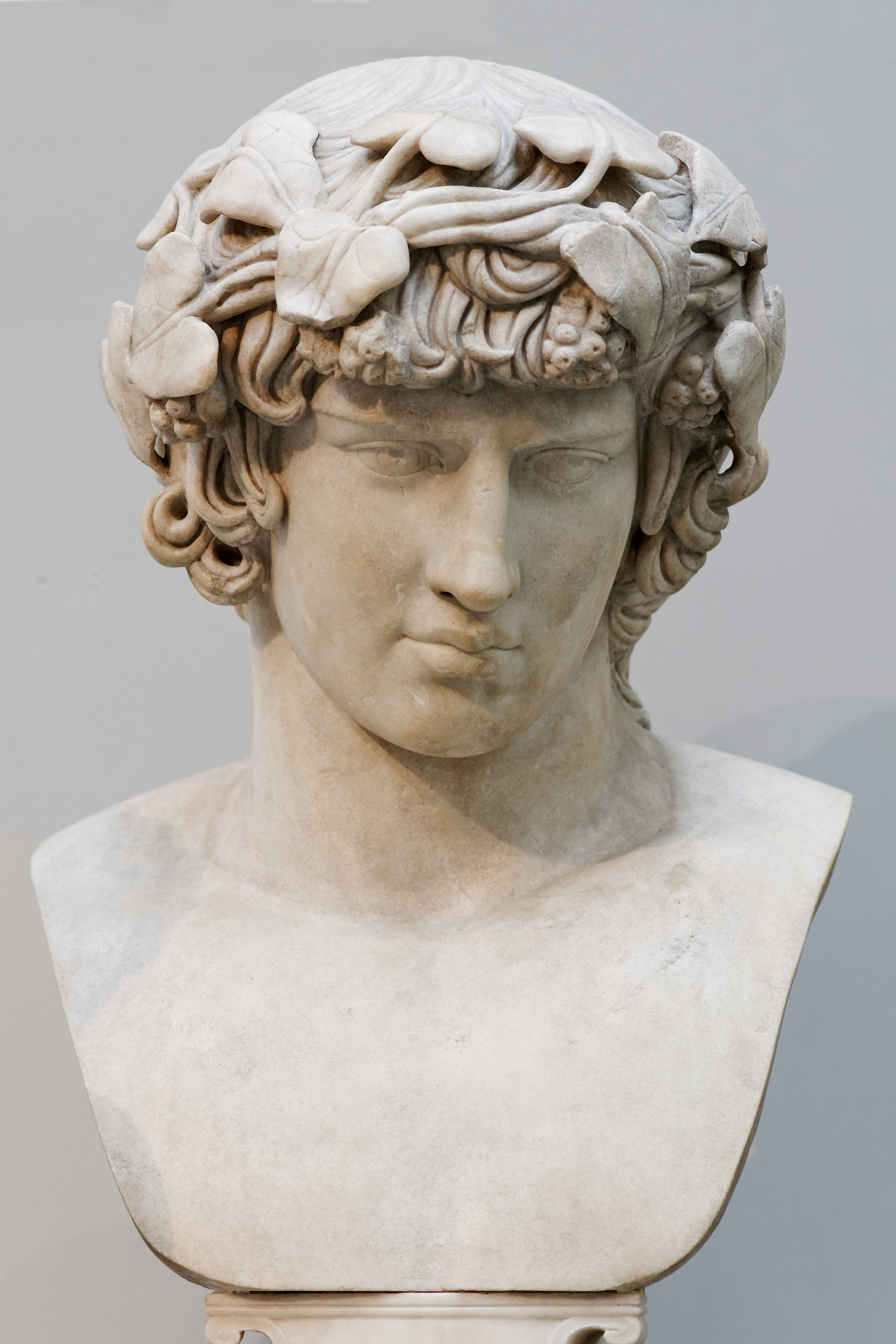
- The bust in 2011
- Completion date: Head: c. 130–140 AD
- Medium: Marble
- Subject: Antinous
- Location: British Museum; London, United Kingdom
- Accession: 1805,0703.97

The Townley Antinous is a marble portrait head of the Greek youth Antinous, the boyfriend or lover of the Roman Emperor Hadrian, wearing an ivy wreath. It is now part of the collection of London's British Museum, and was part of the Townley Marbles. Only the head is ancient, once belonging to statue dating from c. 130–140 and the late reign of Hadrian (r. 117–138); the bust is a modern addition. The portrait probably shows the youth as Dionysus–Bacchus. The bust was acquired along with the rest of the antiquities collected by 18th-century Grand Tourist and Fellow of the Royal Society, Charles Townley. A drawing of the bust attributed to Vincenzo Pacetti is also in the museum's collection.

The head, carved from Parian marble, was believed to have been found on the Janiculum hill near the Villa Doria Pamphili in Rome in 1770, in an area then known as Italian: Tenuta della Tedesca, lit. 'Germanwoman's estate'. It and the remains of the statue to which it belonged were found used as spolia in a roadside wall near the Porta San Pancrazio, a gate in the Aurelian Walls. Townley bought the head in July 1773 from Thomas Jenkins, the antiquary and art dealer, for £150. The head was already in Britain by June 1774, probably having been owned previously by John Sackville, 3rd Duke of Dorset, from whom Jenkins wrote in July 1773 that it was "to be received".

== See also ==
- Antinous Farnese
- Antinous Mondragone
- Capitoline Antinous
- Statue of Antinous (Delphi)
- Townley Hadrian
