= Antinous Farnese =

Marble sculptural representation of Antinous

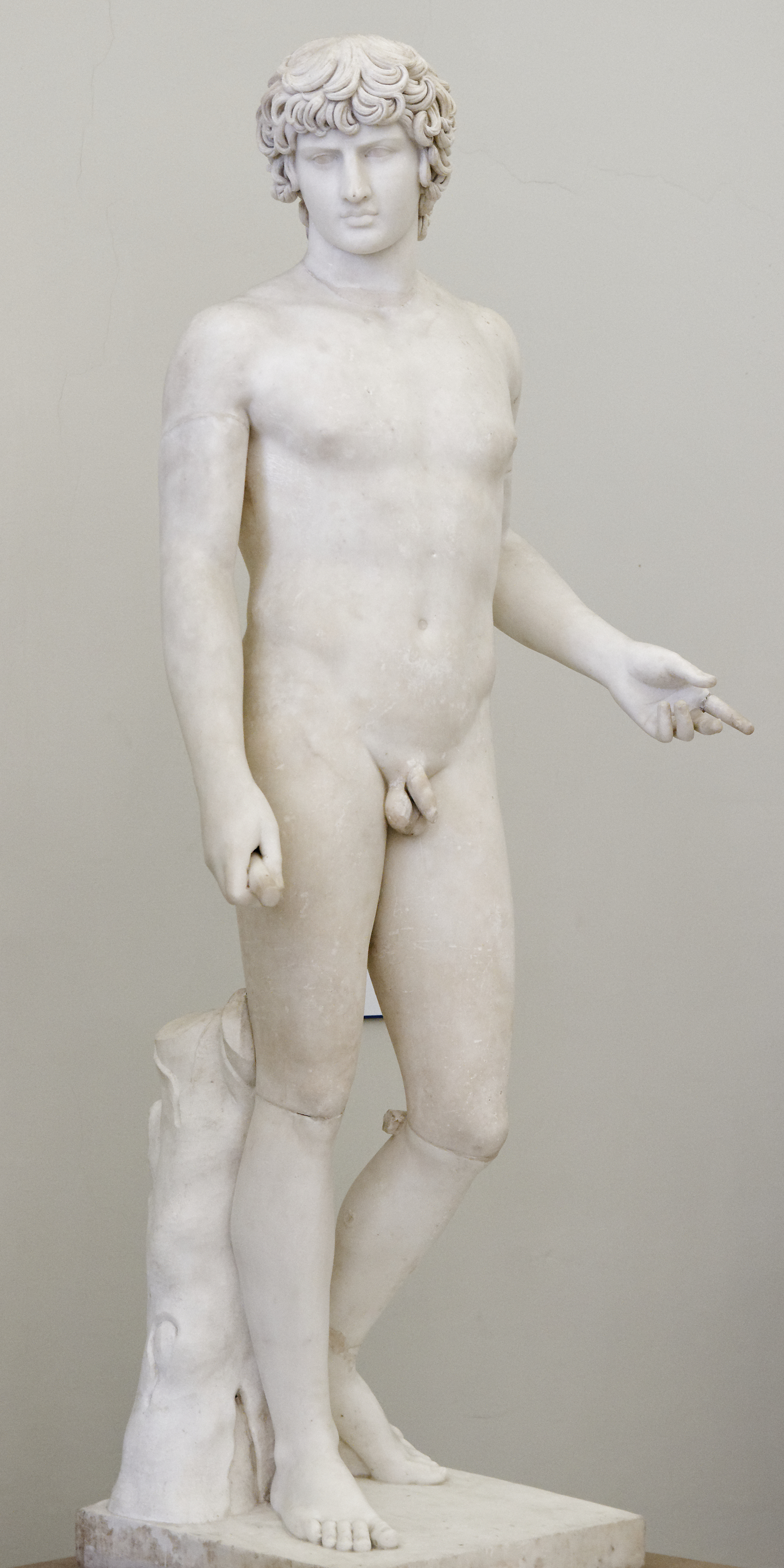
- Medium: Marble
- Subject: Antinous
- Location: Naples National Archaeological Museum, Naples
- Website: https://mannapoli.it/collezione-farnese/#gallery-5

The Antinous Farnese is a marble sculptural representation of Antinous that was sculpted between 130 and 137 CE. Antinous was the lover to Roman Emperor Hadrian; the emperor who, after Antinous's death, perpetuated the image of Antinous as a Roman god within the Roman empire. This sculpture is a part of the Roman Imperial style and was sculpted during a revival of Greek culture, initiated by Hadrian's philhellenism. Its found spot and provenance are unknown, but this sculpture is currently a part of the Farnese Collection in the Naples National Archaeological Museum.

== History ==
Antinous was the Greek lover to the Roman emperor Hadrian in the second century CE. Often referenced to as Hadrian's favorite, or more affectionately Hadrian's boyfriend, Antinous was born in Bithynium 110 CE and is speculated to have drowned in the river Nile before his twentieth birthday in 130 CE. The circumstances of Antinous's death vary by account, though the most popular theories range from accidental, to suicide, and even those that are sacrificial in nature. In honor of his lover, Hadrian established the city of Antinoopolis in Egypt the same year Antinous drowned. Hadrian also went on to deify Antinous postmortem by including him as a figure of the Roman imperial cult; because of this, sculptures of Antinous were produced in large quantities for cult worship.

Upon Antinous's death in 130 CE, Hadrian sought to revitalize Classical Greek sculpture tradition with Roman subject matter. Hadrian's appreciation for Greek art and culture is known as philhellenism, and that love for all things Greek awarded him the nickname "The Greekling." Within Hadrian's lifetime he had visited Greece on three separate occasions, participated in the Greek Olympics, and founded a Greek city-state alliance known as the Panhellenion the year of Antinous's death.

== Description ==
Antinous is a free standing marble sculpture in the round. The philhellenic elements of this statue are drawn from its visual style, while the Farnese Antinous was sculpted in the Roman period, Antinous emulates an athlete in the Classical Greek style. Specifically, this sculpture is emulated after Polykleitos' statue Doryphoros. The most discernible difference between the two is that Antinous is an adolescent youth, while Doryphorus is sculpted as a young adult. Similarities between Antinous and Doryphorus can be drawn with the nude form, use of contrapposto, the stoic expression, as well as the outstretched arm. Doryphorus holds a spear, and Antinous appears to hold something himself in his right hand.

The Antinous Farnese can be identified as a Roman imperial piece rather than Greek Classical by noting the engraved pupils, which was a trend set in Roman sculpture by Hadrian himself. Other Hadrianic-Imperial details of this statue can be seen in the volume of the hair and carved out nostrils, as these features were formed with a drilling techniques that allowed the Romans to explore texture differences in the hair versus skin in ways that had not been possible before. Another indication that this sculpture is Roman, not Greek, is the inclusion of a structural support on the back right leg, casually disguised as a log. This structural support, also known as a strut, may have helped further identify Antinous within the context of its time.

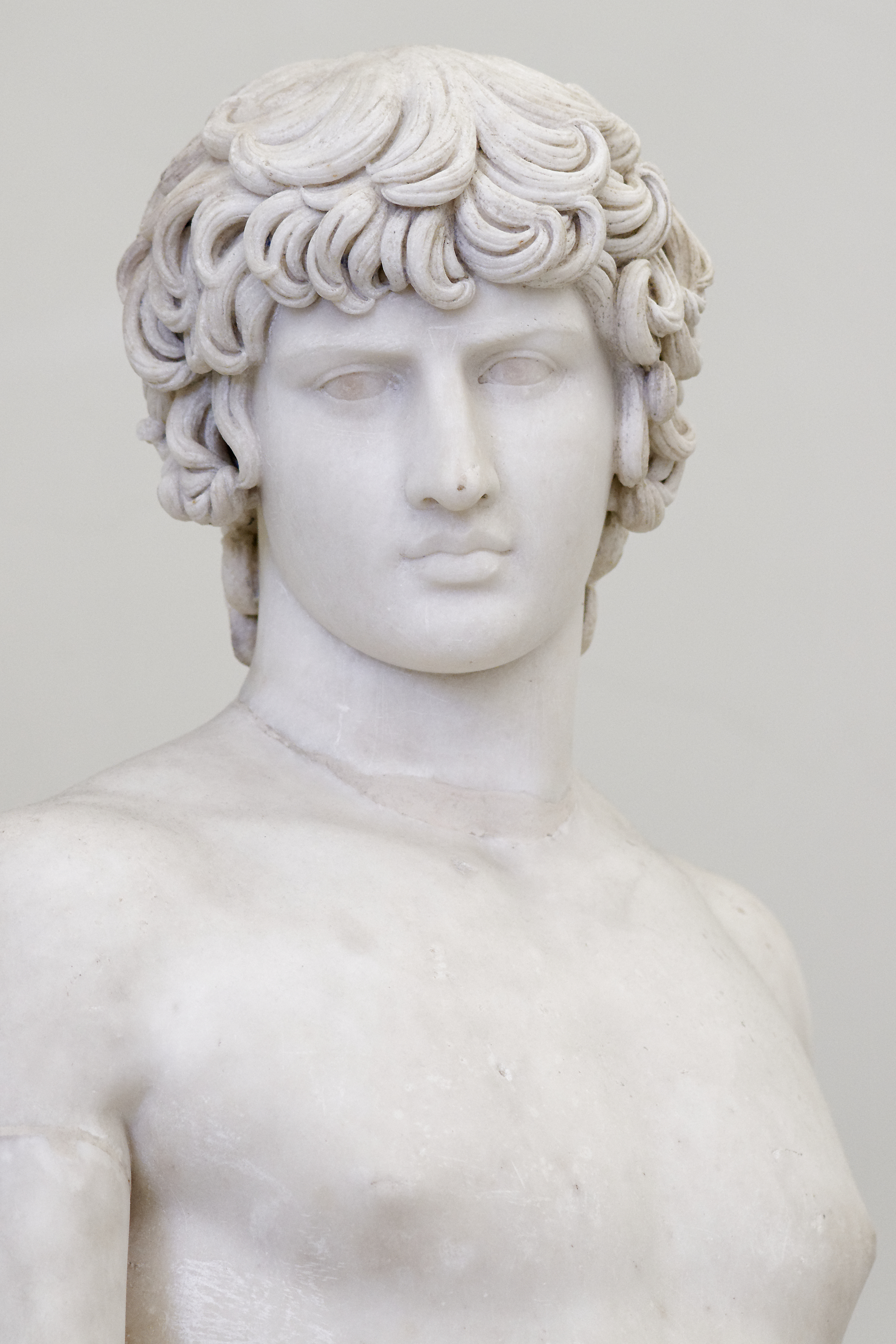
The Farnese Antinous with engraved pupils and signature wig-like hair.

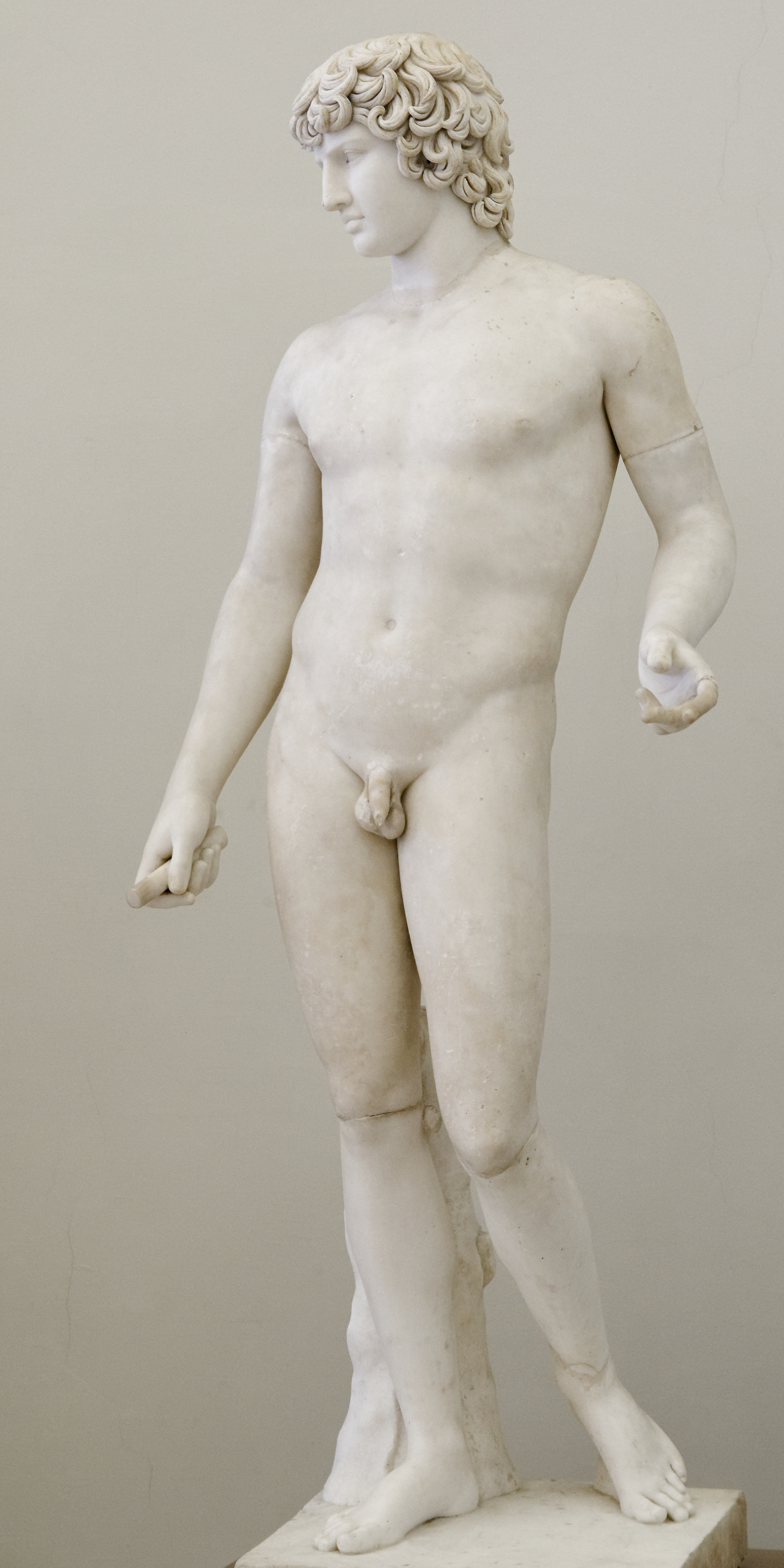
Antinous standing in contrapposto, with a support behind his right leg

=== Identifying Antinous ===
There are three styles in which Antinous is traditionally depicted: the Mondragone style, the Egyptianizing style, and the Haupttypus style. The Haupttypus style is also known as the main or original style because it is the most popular style of Antinous sculpture. The Farnese sculpture falls within the Haupttypus style. Within the Haupttypus style there are two variations, the first Haupttypus variation depicts Antinous with a curl over his brow, and the other does without it.

By sculpting Antinous with consistent conventions artists could delineate Antinous from other Greek mythological figures. The body and face of this sculpture are in idealized youth, with plump cheeks and round face, and his hair is usually unkempt. Antinous's hair has also been described as artificial looking, even wig-like, because of how similar the placement of his hair is across statues. His youthful appearance, large eyes, pouting lips, and layered locks of hair over his forehead are some of the iconography that can be used to identify him. The iconography of Antinous' appearance is so steady across mediums that portraits of Antinous on coins were used in attributing this sculpture as himself. This uniformity, particularly in the uniform layout of his curled locks, implies this portrait was made en masse for artists in the Roman empire to make further copies of.

The extensive deification of Antinous as a cult figure has made his likeness the third most common recovered portrait type from Classical Antiquity, following portrait recoveries from Augustus and Hadrian. Despite the large quantity of Antinous statues available for viewing, art historians do not actually know what Antinous looks like because of how heavily he is idealized in his portraits. It was expected that Antinous be sculpted as a deity rather than a man, and by conforming to those standards, it's unknown whether this marble depiction of him, or any depiction of him, is accurate or not.

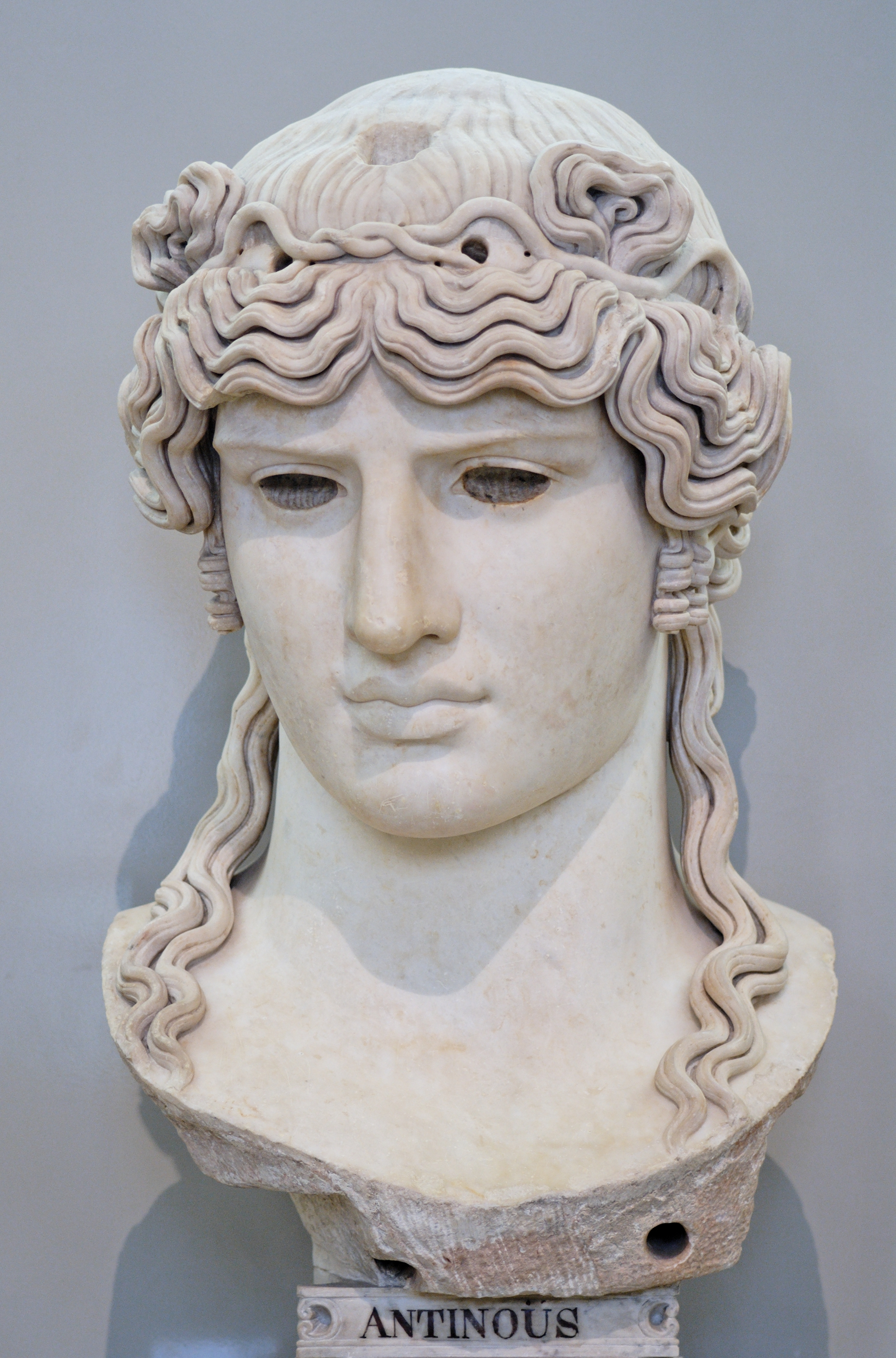
Antinous Mondragone, in the Mondragone Style

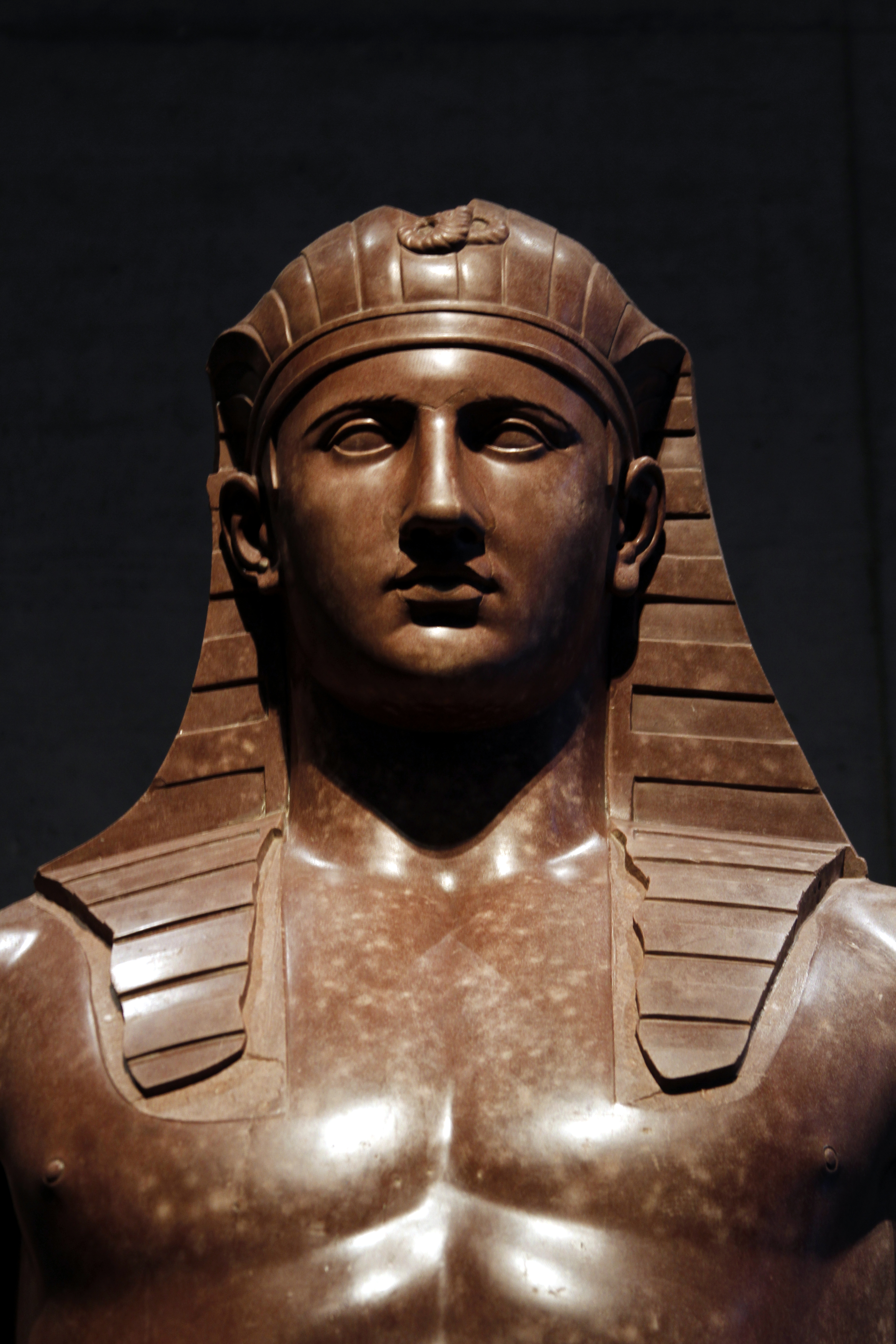
Antinous as Osiris, in the Egyptianizing Style

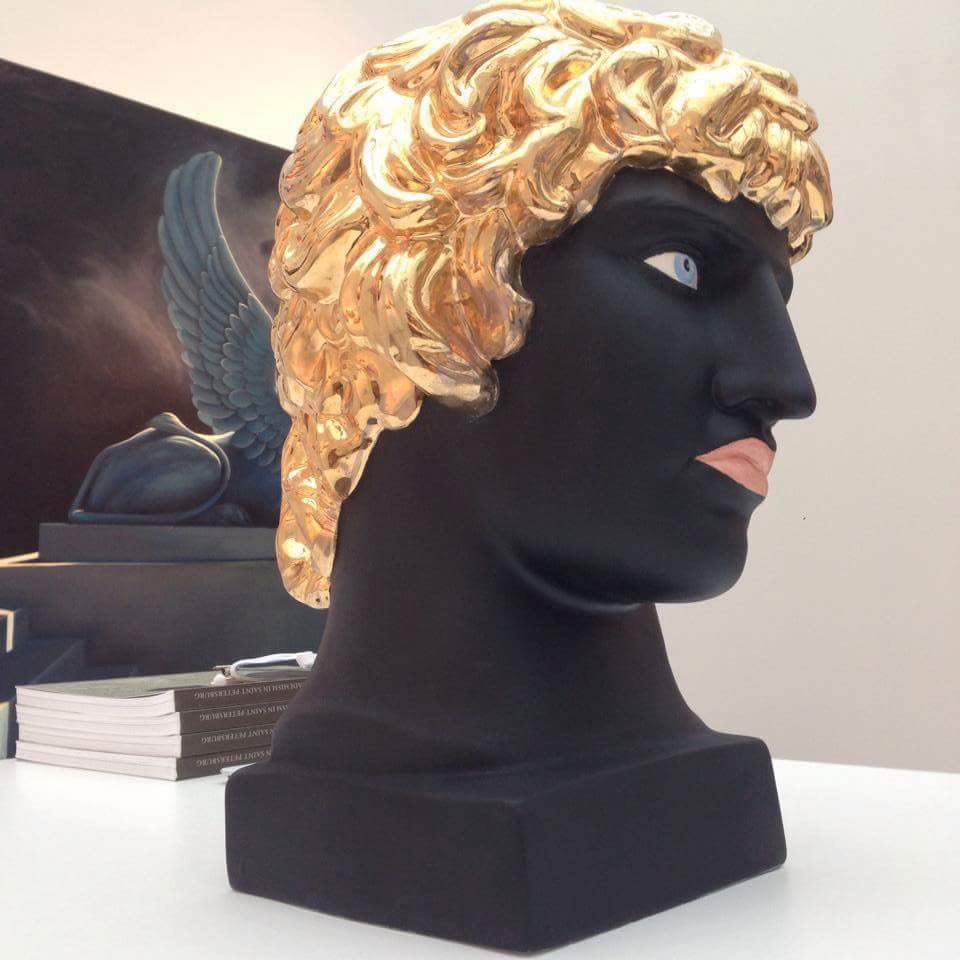
Antinous II, 2005, Olga Tobreluts

== Provenance ==
The Farnese Antinous was named after its one-time owners the Farnese family.

The original provenance for this work of art is unknown, however, there are works of art within the Farnese collection that have some provenance established, such as the Farnese Hercules and the Farnese Bull. It was once displayed at the entrance to the Carracci Gallery in the Palazzo Farnese in Rome, from which it was taken to Naples to the Royal Borbonic Museum (Reale Museo Borbonico), now the Naples National Archaeological Museum (a replica was put in place in the Palazzo in the 1970s).

== See also ==
- Antinous Mondragone
- Capitoline Antinous
- Statue of Antinous (Delphi)
- Townley Antinous
