= Antinous of Epirus =

Antinous (Ancient Greek: Ἀντίνους) was a chief among the Molossians in Epirus, who became involved, against his own will, in the Third Macedonian War of Perseus of Macedon against the Romans.

Antinous' family and that of another chief, Cephalus, were connected with the royal house of Macedonia by friendship, and although he was convinced that the war against Rome would be ruinous to Macedonia and therefore had no intention of joining Perseus, yet Charops, a young man from Epirus, who had been educated at Rome and wished to insinuate himself into the favor of the Romans, spread rumors that Antinous and Cephalus entertained a secret hostility towards Rome. Antinous and his friends at first treated the machinations of Charops with contempt, but when they saw that some of their friends were being arrested and conveyed to Rome, Antinous and Cephalus were compelled, for the sake of their own safety, openly, though unwillingly, to join the Macedonian side of the war, and the Molossians followed their example.

After the outbreak of the war, Antinous died in 168 BCE. Polybius does not state clearly whether Antinous fell in battle, or whether he put an end to his own life in despair.
