= Statue of Antinous (Delphi) =

Statue of Antinous found at Delphi

Antinous of Delphi
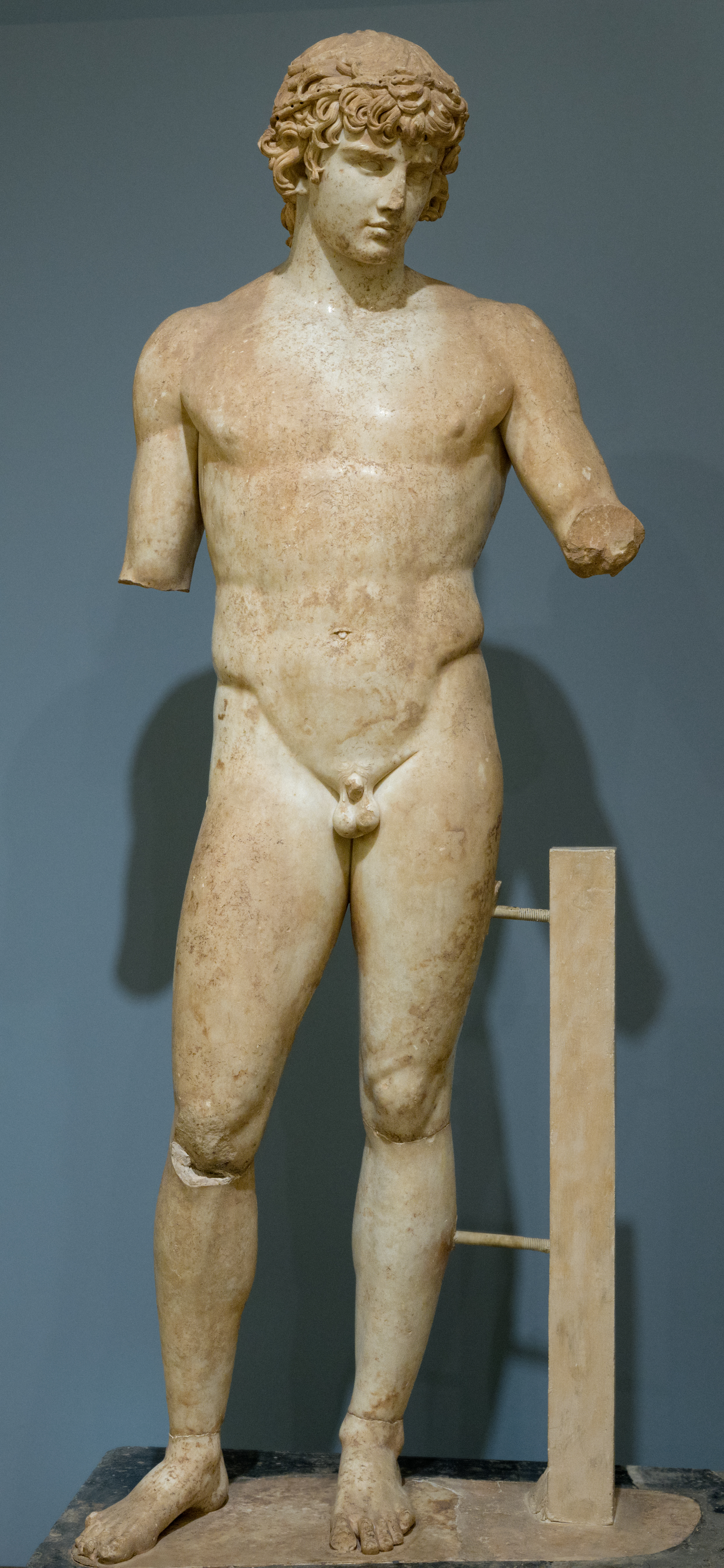
- The statue at the museum
- Year: c 130 AD
- Medium: Marble
- Movement: Roman
- Subject: Antinous
- Condition: Forearms missing
- Location: Delphi Archaeological Museum; Delphi, Greece

The Statue of Antinous at Delphi is an ancient statue that was found during excavations in Delphi.

Antinous was a young Greek of extraordinary beauty from Bithynia, who became the beloved companion or lover of the Roman emperor Hadrian but later died in the Nile under mysterious circumstances.

== History ==
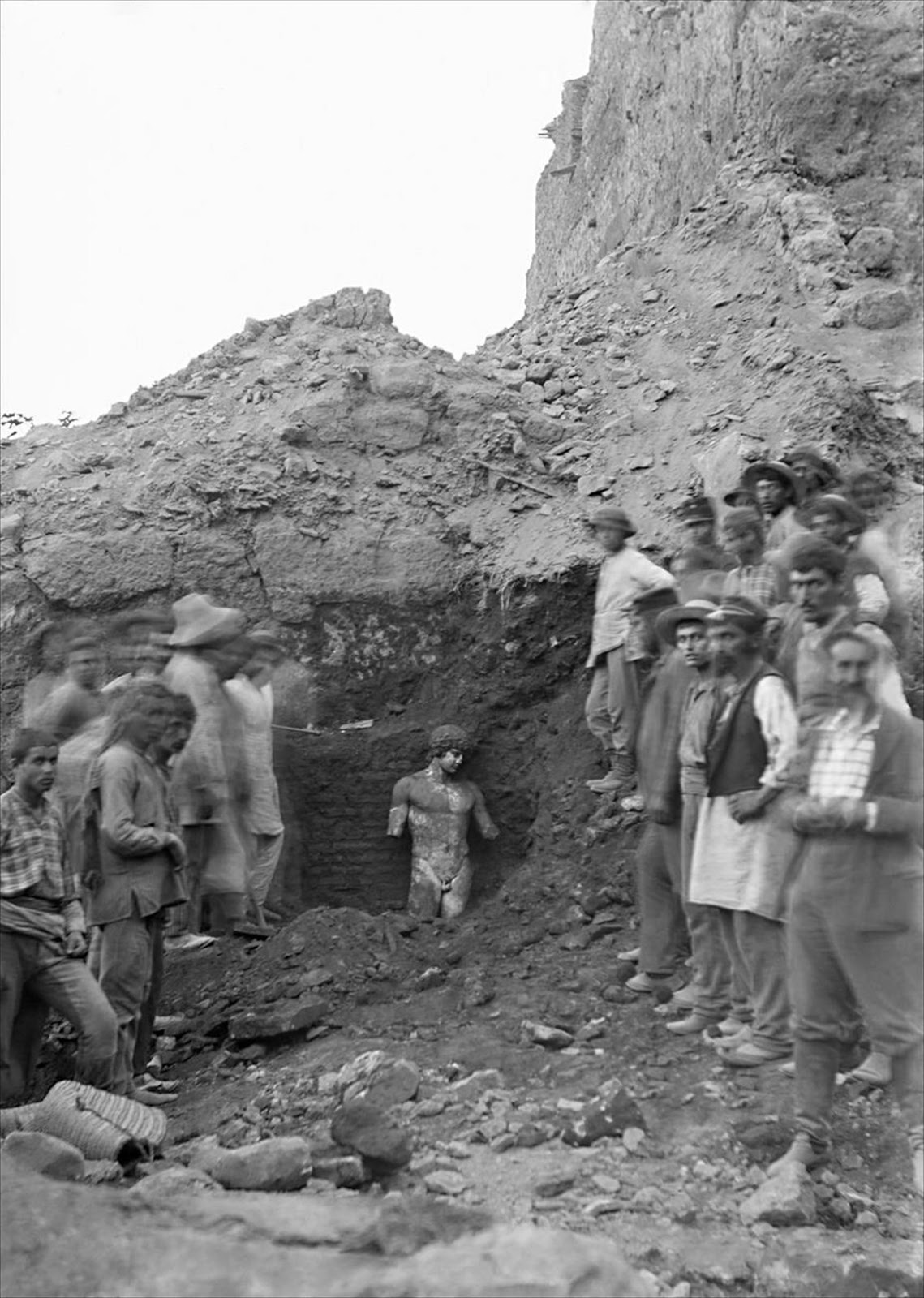
Discovery in 1894

Stricken by the death of Antinous, Hadrian, who was an admirer and a passionate devotee of classical Greek Antiquity, and also a patron of the Oracle of Delphi, gave orders that statues of the beautiful young man, whom he had loved so passionately, should be erected in all sanctuaries and cities of his vast empire. Furthermore he decreed the institution and establishment of Games in honor of Antinous, who thereafter was honoured and worshipped as a god. Thus a statue of Antinous was erected within the sanctuary of Delphi, after his death, in 130 AD, and it was one of the most beautiful and impressive cult statues.

During the excavations, the statue was discovered upright on its pedestal, next to the wall of a brick chamber, alongside the holy Temple. Roman coins minted to honour Αntinous show the statue accompanied by the epithet "Propylaeus", from which it is legitimate to infer that it was originally placed at the entrance to the sanctuary. The statue suffered damage and was broken at the height of the knee, so that it had to be moved closer to the temple of Apollo, in a sort of chapel, where it was found during excavations in relatively good condition. Its idealized characteristics as well as the intense polishing of its marble surface with a special oil (which helped it to survive gleaming and in excellent condition) indicate that it belongs to the time of the radical Hadrian.

== Description ==
Taking a closer look at the statue, the head of young Antinous is tilted to the side as if he is in a state of reflection. Around its thick and masterfully carved hair (which surrounds the face and falls on the forehead and cheeks, lending a mournful quality to its beautiful, full of vain youthful figure), several holes can be seen by which a bronze laurel wreath was once attached. His body is carved in representation of that beautiful nudity which belonged to the figures of gods and heroes of classical antiquity, and the posture is typically contrapposto.

== See also ==
- Antinous Farnese
- Antinous Mondragone
- Capitoline Antinous
- Townley Antinous
