= Marcus Aurelius =

Stoic philosopher, Roman emperor from 161 to 180

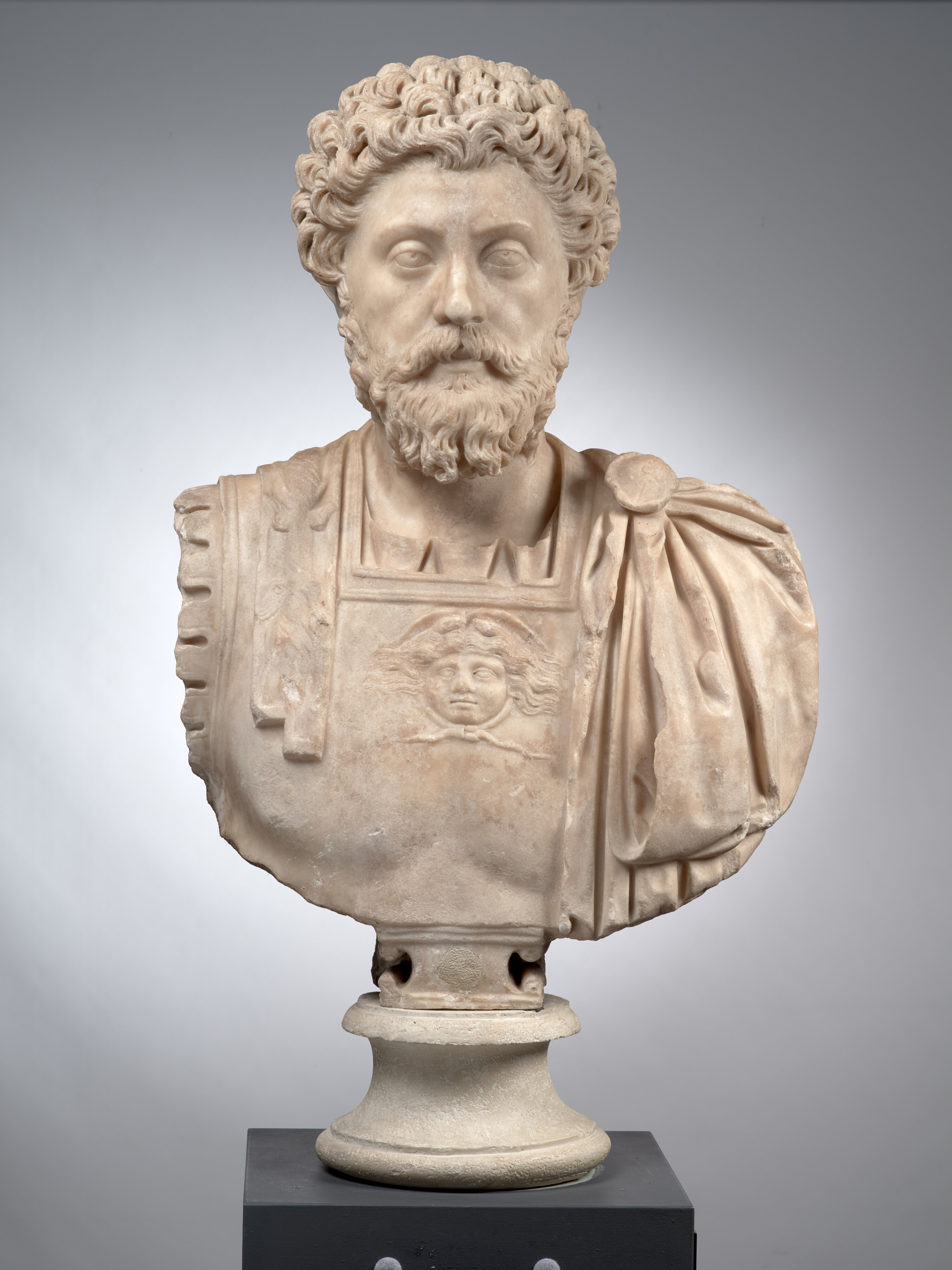
- Bust, Musée Saint-Raymond

Roman emperor
- Reign: 7 March 161 – 17 March 180
- Predecessor: Antoninus Pius
- Successor: Commodus
- Co-emperors: Lucius Verus (161–169); Commodus (177–180)
- Born: 26 April 121; Rome
- Died: 17 March 180 (aged 58); Vindobona, Pannonia Superior, or Sirmium, Pannonia Inferior
- Burial: Hadrian's Mausoleum
- Spouse: Faustina the Younger (m. 145; d. 175)
- Issue Among others: Lucilla; Faustina; Fadilla; Cornificia Faustina Minor; Commodus; Annius Verus; Sabina
Names
- Marcus Annius Catilius Severus (birth); Marcus Annius Verus (124); Marcus Aelius Aurelius Verus Caesar (138)
Regnal name
- Imperator Caesar Marcus Aurelius Antoninus Augustus
- Dynasty: Nerva–Antonine
- Father: Marcus Annius Verus; Antoninus Pius (adoptive)
- Mother: Domitia Lucilla

Philosophical work
- Era: Hellenistic philosophy
- Region: Western philosophy
- School: Stoicism
- Main interests: Ethics
- Notable works: Meditations
- Notable ideas: Memento mori

Marcus Aurelius Antoninus (/ɔːˈriːliəs/ or-EE-lee-əs; Latin: [ˈmaːrkʊs au̯ˈreːli.us antoːˈniːnʊs]; 26 April 121 – 17 March 180) was Roman emperor from 161 to 180 and a Stoic philosopher. He was a member of the Nerva–Antonine dynasty, the last of the rulers later known as the Five Good Emperors and the last emperor of the Pax Romana, an age of relative peace, calm, and stability for the Roman Empire lasting from 27 BC to 180 AD. He served as Roman consul in 140, 145, and 161.

Marcus Aurelius was the son of the praetor Marcus Annius Verus and his wife Domitia Calvilla. He was related through marriage to the emperors Trajan and Hadrian. Marcus was three when his father died, and he was raised by his mother and paternal grandfather. After Hadrian's adoptive son, Aelius Caesar, died in 138, Hadrian adopted Marcus's uncle Antoninus Pius as his new heir. In turn, Antoninus adopted Marcus and Lucius, the son of Aelius. Hadrian died that year, and Antoninus became emperor. Now heir to the throne, Marcus studied Greek and Latin under tutors such as Herodes Atticus and Marcus Cornelius Fronto. He married Antoninus's daughter Faustina in 145.

After Antoninus died in 161, Marcus acceded to the throne alongside his adoptive brother, who took the regnal name Lucius Aurelius Verus. Under the reign of Marcus Aurelius, the Roman Empire witnessed much military conflict. In the East, the Romans fought the Parthian War of Lucius Verus with a revitalised Parthian Empire and the rebel Kingdom of Armenia. Marcus defeated the Marcomanni, Quadi, and Iazyges in the Marcomannic Wars. These and other Germanic peoples began to represent a troubling reality for the Empire. He reduced the silver purity of the Roman currency, the denarius. The persecution of Christians in the Roman Empire appears to have increased during his reign, although his involvement is unlikely since there are no Christian sources ascribing him the blame, and he was praised by Justin Martyr and Tertullian. The Antonine Plague broke out in 165 or 166 and devastated the population of the Roman Empire, causing the deaths of five to ten million people. Lucius Verus may have died from the plague in 169. When Marcus himself died in 180, he was succeeded by his son Commodus.

Commodus's succession after Marcus has been a subject of debate among both contemporary and modern historians. The column and equestrian statue of Marcus Aurelius still stand in Rome, where they were erected in celebration of his military victories. As a philosopher, his work Meditations is one of the most important sources for the modern understanding of ancient Stoic philosophy. These writings have been praised by fellow writers, philosophers, monarchs, and politicians centuries after his death.

== Sources ==
The major sources depicting the life and rule of Marcus Aurelius are patchy and frequently unreliable. The most important group of sources, the biographies contained in the Historia Augusta, claimed to be written by a group of authors at the turn of the 4th century AD, but it is believed they were in fact written by a single author (referred to here as 'the biographer') from about 395. The later biographies and the biographies of subordinate emperors and usurpers are unreliable, but the earlier biographies, derived primarily from now-lost earlier sources (Marius Maximus or Ignotus), are considered to be more accurate. For Marcus's life and rule, the biographies of Hadrian, Antoninus, Marcus, and Lucius are largely reliable, but those of Aelius Verus and Avidius Cassius are not.

A body of correspondence between Marcus's tutor Fronto and various Antonine officials survives in a series of patchy manuscripts, covering the period from c. 138 to 166. Marcus's own Meditations offer a window on his inner life, but are largely undateable and make few specific references to worldly affairs. The main narrative source for the period is Cassius Dio, a Greek senator from Nicaea who wrote a history of Rome from its founding to 229 in eighty books. Dio is vital for the military history of the period, but his senatorial prejudices and strong opposition to imperial expansion obscure his perspective. Some other literary sources provide specific details: the writings of the physician Galen on the habits of the Antonine elite, the orations of Aelius Aristides on the temper of the times, and the constitutions preserved in the Digest and Codex Justinianeus on Marcus's legal work. Inscriptions and coin finds supplement the literary sources.

== Early life ==
=== Name ===
Marcus was born in Rome on 26 April 121. His birth name is sometimes given as Marcus Annius Verus, but sources assign this name to him upon his father's death and unofficial adoption by his grandfather, upon his coming of age. He may have been known as "Marcus Annius Catilius Severus", at birth or some point in his youth, or "Marcus Catilius Severus Annius Verus". Upon his adoption by Antoninus as heir to the throne, he was known as "Marcus Aelius Aurelius Verus Caesar" and, upon his ascension, he was "Marcus Aurelius Antoninus Augustus" until his death; Epiphanius of Salamis, in his chronology of the Roman emperors included in his On Weights and Measures, calls him Marcus Aurelius Verus.

=== Family origins ===
The father of Marcus Aurelius was Marcus Annius Verus (III). His gens Annia was of Italic origin, but settled at some point in the small colony of Ucubi (Colonia Claritas Iulia Ucubi) south-east of Córdoba in Iberian Baetica (modern Andalusia, Spain); the gens had legendary claims of descendance from Numa Pompilius. The Annii Veri rose to prominence in Rome in the late 1st century AD. Marcus's great-grandfather Marcus Annius Verus (I) was a senator and (according to the Historia Augusta) ex-praetor; his grandfather Marcus Annius Verus (II) was made patrician in 73–74. Through his grandmother Rupilia Faustina, Marcus was related to the Nerva-Antonine dynasty; Rupilla was the step-daughter of Salonia Matidia, who was the niece of the emperor Trajan. (Note: Dio asserts that the Annii were near-kin of Hadrian, and that it was to these familial ties that they owed their rise to power. The precise nature of these kinship ties is nowhere stated, but is believed that Rupilia Faustina was the daughter of the consular senator Libo Rupilius Frugi and Vitellia, daughter of emperor Vitellius.)

Marcus's mother, Domitia Lucilla Minor (also known as Domitia Calvilla), was the daughter of the Roman patrician P. Calvisius Tullus and inherited a great fortune (described at length in one of Pliny's letters) from her parents and grandparents. Her inheritance included large brickworks on the outskirts of Rome – a profitable enterprise in an era when the city was experiencing a construction boom – and the Horti Domitia Calvillae (or Lucillae), a villa on the Caelian Hill of Rome. Marcus himself was born and raised in the Horti and referred to the Caelian Hill as 'My Caelian'.

The adoptive family of Marcus was the gens Aurelia, an old Roman gens. His adoptive father Antoninus Pius came from the Aurelii Fulvi, a branch of the Aurelii settled in the colony of Nemausus in Roman Gaul.

=== Childhood ===
Marcus's sister, Annia Cornificia Faustina, was probably born in 122 or 123. His father probably died in 125 or 126 when Marcus was three years old during his praetorship. (Note: Farquharson dates his death to 130 when Marcus was nine.) Though he can hardly have known his father, Marcus wrote in his Meditations that he had learned 'modesty and manliness' from his memories of his father and the man's posthumous reputation. His mother Lucilla did not remarry and, following prevailing aristocratic customs, probably did not spend much time with her son. Instead, Marcus was in the care of 'nurses', and was raised after his father's death by his grandfather Marcus Annius Verus (II), who had always retained the legal authority of patria potestas over his son and grandson. Technically this was not an adoption, the creation of a new and different patria potestas. Lucius Catilius Severus, described as Marcus's maternal great-grandfather, also participated in his upbringing; he was probably the elder Domitia Lucilla's stepfather. Marcus was raised in his parents' home on the Caelian Hill, an upscale area with few public buildings but many aristocratic villas. He also spent much of his childhood in a palace beside the Lateran, owned by his grandfather. Marcus thanks this grandfather for teaching him 'good character and avoidance of bad temper'. He was less fond of the mistress his grandfather took and lived with after the death of his wife Rupilia. Marcus was grateful that he did not have to live with her longer than he did.

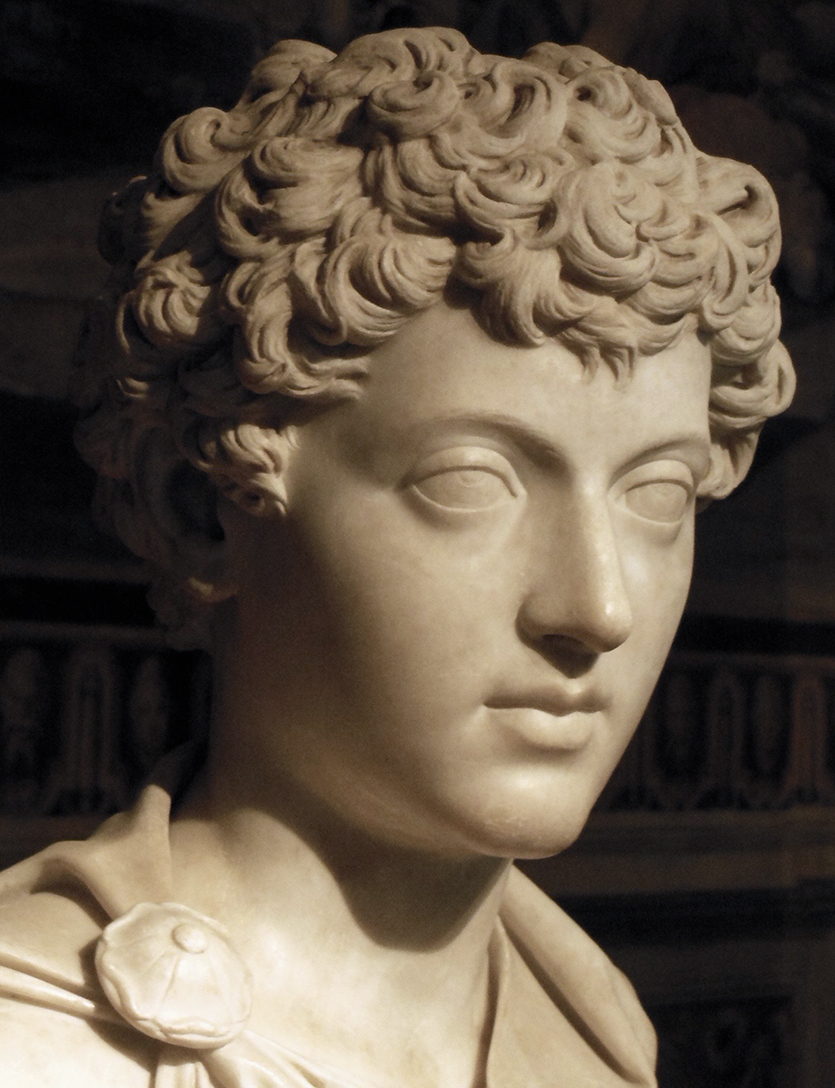
A bust of young Marcus Aurelius (Capitoline Museum). Anthony Birley, his modern biographer, writes of the bust: 'This is certainly a grave young man'.

From a young age, Marcus displayed enthusiasm for wrestling and boxing. He trained in wrestling as a youth and into his teenage years, learned to fight in armour and joined the Salii, an order of priests dedicated to the god Mars that were responsible for the sacred shields, called Ancilia, and possibly for heralding war season's beginning and end. Marcus was educated at home, in line with contemporary aristocratic trends; he thanks Catilius Severus for encouraging him to avoid public schools. One of his teachers, Diognetus, a painting master, proved particularly influential; he seems to have introduced Marcus Aurelius to the philosophic way of life. In April 132, at the behest of Diognetus, Marcus took up the dress and habits of the philosopher: he studied while wearing a rough Greek cloak, and slept on the ground until his mother persuaded him to use a bed. A new set of tutors – the Homeric scholar Alexander of Cotiaeum along with Trosius Aper and Tuticius Proculus, teachers of Latin (Note: Birley amends the text of the HA Marcus from 'Eutychius' to 'Tuticius'.) – took over Marcus's education in about 132 or 133. Marcus thanks Alexander for his training in literary styling. Alexander's influence – an emphasis on matter over style and careful wording, with the occasional Homeric quotation – has been detected in Marcus's Meditations.

=== Succession to Hadrian ===
In late 136, Hadrian almost died from a haemorrhage. Convalescent in his villa at Tivoli, he selected Lucius Ceionius Commodus, Marcus's intended father-in-law, as his successor and adopted son, according to the biographer 'against the wishes of everyone'. While his motives are not certain, it would appear that his goal was to eventually place the then-too-young Marcus on the throne. As part of his adoption, Commodus took the name, Lucius Aelius Caesar. His health was so poor that, during a ceremony to mark his becoming heir to the throne, he was too weak to lift a large shield on his own. After a brief stationing on the Danube frontier, Aelius returned to Rome to make an address to the Senate on the first day of 138. However, the night before the scheduled speech, he grew ill and died of a haemorrhage later in the day. (Note: Commodus was a known consumptive at the time of his adoption, so Hadrian may have intended Marcus's eventual succession anyway.)

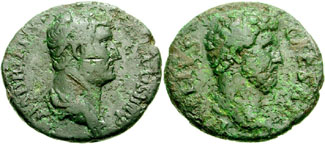
Coin (AD 136–138) of Hadrian (obverse) and his adoptive son, Lucius Aelius (reverse). Hadrian is wearing the laurel crown. Inscription: HADRIANVS ... / LVCIVS CAESAR.

On 24 January 138, Hadrian selected Aurelius Antoninus, the husband of Marcus's aunt Faustina the Elder, as his new successor. As part of Hadrian's terms, Antoninus, in turn, adopted Marcus and Lucius Commodus, the son of Lucius Aelius. Marcus became M. Aelius Aurelius Verus, and Lucius became L. Aelius Aurelius Commodus. At Hadrian's request, Antoninus's daughter Faustina was betrothed to Lucius. Marcus reportedly greeted the news that Hadrian had become his adoptive grandfather with sadness, instead of joy. Only with reluctance did he move from his mother's house on the Caelian to Hadrian's private home.

At some time in 138, Hadrian requested in the Senate that Marcus be exempt from the law barring him from becoming quaestor before his twenty-fourth birthday. The Senate complied, and Marcus served under Antoninus, the consul for 139. Marcus's adoption diverted him from the typical career path of his class. If not for his adoption, he probably would have become triumvir monetalis, a highly regarded post involving token administration of the state mint; after that, he could have served as tribune with a legion, becoming the legion's nominal second-in-command. Marcus probably would have opted for travel and further education instead. As it was, Marcus was set apart from his fellow citizens. Nonetheless, his biographer attests that his character remained unaffected: 'He still showed the same respect to his relations as he had when he was an ordinary citizen, and he was as thrifty and careful of his possessions as he had been when he lived in a private household'.

After a series of suicide attempts, all thwarted by Antoninus, Hadrian left for Baiae, a seaside resort on the Campanian coast. His condition did not improve, and he abandoned the diet prescribed by his doctors, indulging himself in food and drink. He sent for Antoninus, who was at his side when he died on 10 July 138. His remains were buried quietly at Puteoli. The succession to Antoninus was peaceful and stable: Antoninus kept Hadrian's nominees in office and appeased the senate, respecting its privileges and commuting the death sentences of men charged in Hadrian's last days. For his dutiful behaviour, Antoninus was asked to accept the name 'Pius'.

=== Heir to Antoninus Pius (138–145) ===
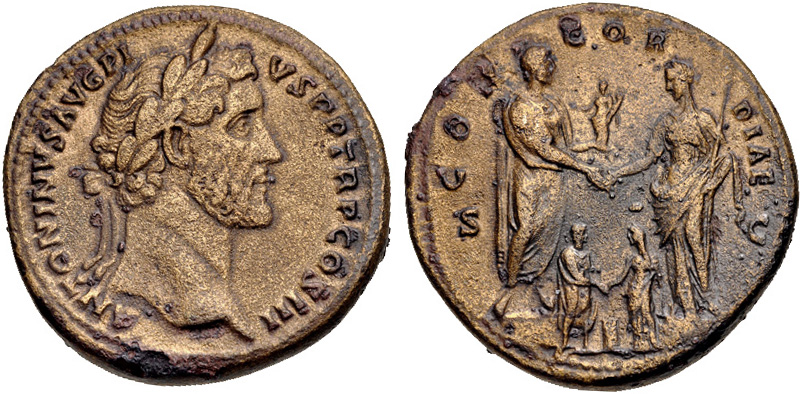
Sestertius of Antoninus Pius (AD 140–144). It celebrates the betrothal of Marcus Aurelius and Faustina the Younger in 139, pictured below Antoninus, who is holding a statuette of Concordia and clasping hands with Faustina the Elder. Inscription: ANTONINVS AVG. PIVS P. P., TR. P., CO[N]S. III / CONCORDIAE S.C.

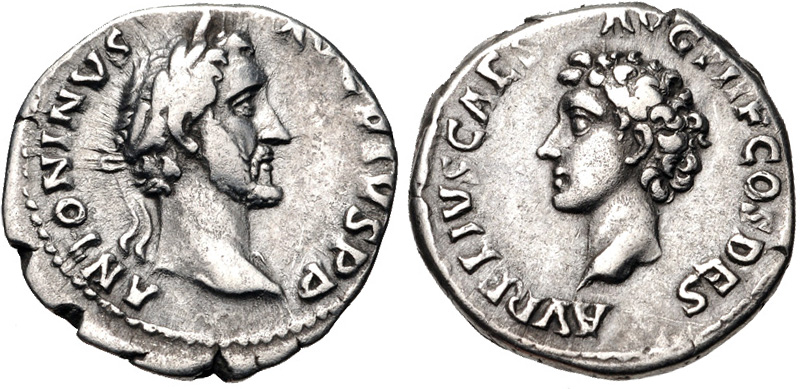
Denarius of Antoninus Pius (AD 139), with a portrait of Marcus Aurelius on the reverse. Inscription: ANTONINVS AVG. PIVS P. P. / AVRELIVS CAES. AVG. PII F. CO[N]S. DES.

Immediately after Hadrian's death, Antoninus approached Marcus and requested that his marriage arrangements be amended: Marcus's betrothal to Ceionia Fabia would be annulled, and he would be betrothed to Faustina, Antoninus's daughter, instead. Faustina's betrothal to Ceionia's brother Lucius Commodus would also have to be annulled. Marcus consented to Antoninus's proposal. He was made consul for 140 with Antoninus as his colleague, and was appointed as a sevir, one of the knights' six commanders, at the order's annual parade on 15 July 139. As the heir apparent, Marcus became princeps iuventutis, head of the equestrian order. He now took the name Marcus Aelius Aurelius Verus Caesar. Marcus would later caution himself against taking the name too seriously: 'See that you do not turn into a Caesar; do not be dipped into the purple dye – for that can happen'. At the senate's request, Marcus joined all the priestly colleges (pontifices, augures, quindecimviri sacris faciundis, septemviri epulonum, etc.); direct evidence for membership, however, is available only for the Arval Brethren.

Antoninus demanded that Marcus reside in the House of Tiberius, the imperial palace on the Palatine, and take up the habits of his new station, the aulicum fastigium or 'pomp of the court', against Marcus's objections. Marcus would struggle to reconcile the life of the court with his philosophic yearnings. He told himself it was an attainable goal – 'Where life is possible, then it is possible to live the right life; life is possible in a palace, so it is possible to live the right life in a palace' – but he found it difficult nonetheless. He would criticise himself in the Meditations for 'abusing court life' in front of company.

As quaestor, Marcus would have had little real administrative work to do. He would read imperial letters to the senate when Antoninus was absent and would do secretarial work for the senators. But he felt drowned in paperwork and complained to his tutor, Marcus Cornelius Fronto: 'I am so out of breath from dictating nearly thirty letters'. He was being 'fitted for ruling the state', in the words of his biographer. He was required to make a speech to the assembled senators as well, making oratorical training essential for the job.

On 1 January 145, Marcus was made consul a second time. Fronto urged him in a letter to have plenty of sleep 'so that you may come into the Senate with a good colour and read your speech with a strong voice'. Marcus had complained of an illness in an earlier letter: 'As far as my strength is concerned, I am beginning to get it back; and there is no trace of the pain in my chest. But that ulcer [...] (Note: The manuscript is corrupt here.) I am having treatment and taking care not to do anything that interferes with it'. Never particularly healthy or strong, Marcus was praised by Cassius Dio, writing of his later years, for behaving dutifully in spite of his various illnesses. In April 145, Marcus married Faustina, legally his sister, as had been planned since 138. Little is specifically known of the ceremony, but the biographer calls it 'noteworthy'. Coins were issued with the heads of the couple, and Antoninus, as Pontifex Maximus, would have officiated. Marcus makes no apparent reference to the marriage in his surviving letters, and only sparing references to Faustina.

=== Fronto and further education ===
After taking the toga virilis in 136, Marcus probably began his training in oratory. He had three tutors in Greek (Aninus Macer, Caninius Celer, and Herodes Atticus) and one in Latin (Marcus Cornelius Fronto). The latter two were the most esteemed orators of their time, but probably did not become his tutors until his adoption by Antoninus in 138. The preponderance of Greek tutors indicates the importance of the Greek language to the aristocracy of Rome. This was the age of the Second Sophistic, a renaissance in Greek letters. Although educated in Rome, in his Meditations Marcus would write his inmost thoughts in Greek.

Atticus was controversial: an enormously rich Athenian (probably the richest man in the eastern half of the empire), he was quick to anger and resented by his fellow Athenians for his patronising manner. Atticus was an inveterate opponent of Stoicism and philosophic pretensions. He thought the Stoics' desire for apatheia was foolish: they would live a 'sluggish, enervated life', he said. In spite of the influence of Atticus, Marcus would later become a Stoic. He would not mention Herodes at all in his Meditations, in spite of the fact that they would come into contact many times over the following decades.

Fronto was highly esteemed: in the self-consciously antiquarian world of Latin letters, he was thought of as second only to Cicero, perhaps even an alternative to him. (Note: Modern scholars have not offered as positive an assessment. His second modern editor, Niebuhr, thought him stupid and frivolous; his third editor, Naber, found him contemptible. Historians have seen him as a 'pedant and a bore', his letters offering neither the running political analysis of a Cicero or the conscientious reportage of a Pliny. Recent prosopographic research has rehabilitated his reputation, though not by much.) He did not care much for Atticus, though Marcus was eventually to put the pair on speaking terms. Fronto exercised a complete mastery of Latin, capable of tracing expressions through the literature, producing obscure synonyms, and challenging minor improprieties in word choice.

A significant amount of the correspondence between Fronto and Marcus has survived. The pair were very close, using intimate language such as 'Farewell my Fronto, wherever you are, my most sweet love and delight. How is it between you and me? I love you and you are not here' in their correspondence. Marcus spent time with Fronto's wife and daughter, both named Cratia, and they enjoyed light conversation.

He wrote Fronto a letter on his birthday, claiming to love him as he loved himself, and calling on the gods to ensure that every word he learnt of literature, he would learn 'from the lips of Fronto'. His prayers for Fronto's health were more than conventional, because Fronto was frequently ill; at times, he seems to be an almost constant invalid, always suffering – about one-quarter of the surviving letters deal with the man's sicknesses. Marcus asks that Fronto's pain be inflicted on himself, 'of my own accord with every kind of discomfort'.

Fronto never became Marcus's full-time teacher and continued his career as an advocate. One notorious case brought him into conflict with Atticus. Marcus pleaded with Fronto, first with 'advice', then as a 'favour', not to attack Atticus; he had already asked Atticus to refrain from making the first blows. Fronto replied that he was surprised to discover Marcus counted Atticus as a friend (perhaps Atticus was not yet Marcus's tutor), and allowed that Marcus might be correct, but nonetheless affirmed his intent to win the case by any means necessary: '[T]he charges are frightful and must be spoken of as frightful. Those in particular that refer to the beating and robbing I will describe so that they savour of gall and bile. If I happen to call him an uneducated little Greek it will not mean war to the death'. The outcome of the trial is unknown.

By the age of twenty-five (between April 146 and April 147), Marcus had grown disaffected with his studies in jurisprudence, and showed some signs of general malaise. His master, he writes to Fronto, was an unpleasant blowhard, and had made 'a hit at' him: 'It is easy to sit yawning next to a judge, he says, but to be a judge is noble work'. Marcus had grown tired of his exercises, of taking positions in imaginary debates. When he criticised the insincerity of conventional language, Fronto took to defend it. In any case, Marcus's formal education was now over. He had kept his teachers on good terms, following them devotedly. It 'affected his health adversely', his biographer writes, to have devoted so much effort to his studies. It was the only thing the biographer could find fault with in Marcus's entire boyhood.

Fronto had warned Marcus against the study of philosophy early on: "It is better never to have touched the teaching of philosophy [...] than to have tasted it superficially, with the edge of the lips, as the saying is". He disdained philosophy and philosophers and looked down on Marcus's sessions with Apollonius of Chalcedon and others in this circle. Fronto put an uncharitable interpretation of Marcus's 'conversion to philosophy': 'In the fashion of the young, tired of boring work', Marcus had turned to philosophy to escape the constant exercises of oratorical training. Marcus kept in close touch with Fronto, but would ignore Fronto's scruples.

Apollonius may have introduced Marcus to Stoic philosophy, but Quintus Junius Rusticus would have the strongest influence on the boy. (Note: Champlin notes that Marcus's praise of Rusticus in the Meditations is out of order (he is praised immediately after Diognetus, who had introduced Marcus to philosophy), giving him special emphasis.) He was the man Fronto recognised as having 'wooed Marcus away' from oratory. He was older than Fronto and twenty years older than Marcus. As the grandson of Arulenus Rusticus, one of the martyrs to the tyranny of Domitian (r. 81–96), he was heir to the tradition of 'Stoic Opposition' to the 'bad emperors' of the 1st century; the true successor of Seneca (as opposed to Fronto, the false one). Marcus thanks Rusticus for teaching him "not to be led astray into enthusiasm for rhetoric, for writing on speculative themes, for discoursing on moralising texts ... To avoid oratory, poetry, and 'fine writing'".

Philostratus describes how even when Marcus was an old man, in the latter part of his reign, he studied under Sextus of Chaeronea:

The Emperor Marcus was an eager disciple of Sextus the Boeotian philosopher, being often in his company and frequenting his house. Lucius, who had just come to Rome, asked the Emperor, whom he met on his way, where he was going to and on what errand, and Marcus answered, 'it is good even for an old man to learn; I am now on my way to Sextus the philosopher to learn what I do not yet know.' And Lucius, raising his hand to heaven, said, ' O Zeus, the king of the Romans in his old age takes up his tablets and goes to school.'

=== Birth and death ===
On 30 November 147, Faustina gave birth to a girl named Domitia Faustina. She was the first of at least thirteen children (including two sets of twins) that Faustina would bear over the next twenty-three years. The next day, 1 December, Antoninus gave Marcus the tribunician power and the imperium – authority over the armies and provinces of the emperor. As tribune, he had the right to bring one measure before the senate after the four Antoninus could introduce. His tribunician powers would be renewed with Antoninus's on 10 December 147. The first mention of Domitia in Marcus's letters reveals her as a sickly infant. 'Caesar to Fronto. If the gods are willing we seem to have a hope of recovery. The diarrhoea has stopped, the little attacks of fever have been driven away. But the emaciation is still extreme and there is still quite a bit of coughing'. He and Faustina, Marcus wrote, had been 'pretty occupied' with the girl's care. Domitia would die in 151.

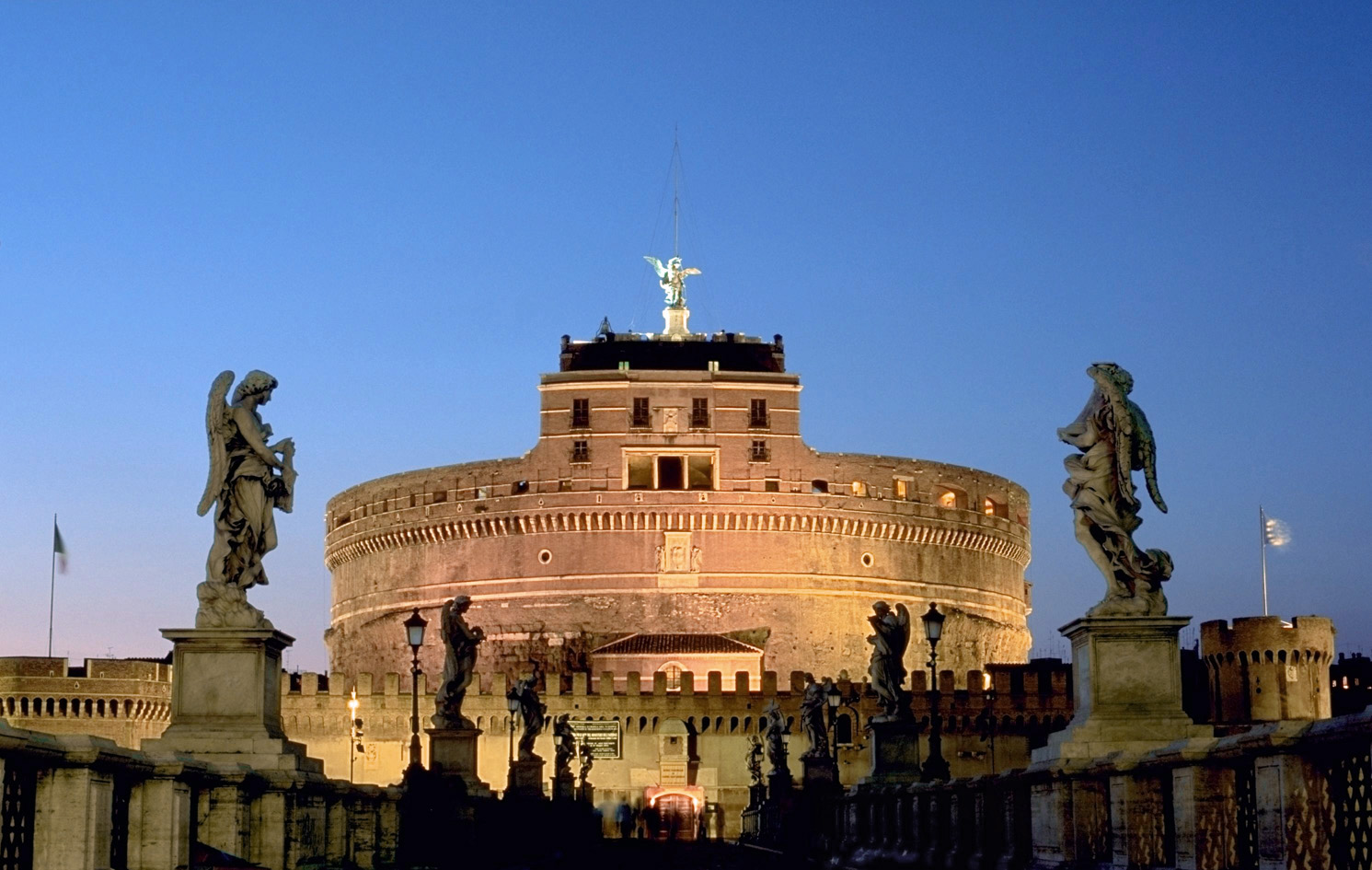
The Mausoleum of Hadrian, where the children of Marcus and Faustina were buried

In 149, Faustina gave birth again, to twin sons. Contemporary coinage commemorates the event, with crossed cornucopiae beneath portrait busts of the two small boys, and the legend temporum felicitas, 'the happiness of the times'. They did not survive long. Before the end of the year, another family coin was issued: it shows only a tiny girl, Domitia Faustina, and one boy baby. Then another: the girl alone. The infants were buried in the Mausoleum of Hadrian, where their epitaphs survive. They were called Titus Aurelius Antoninus and Tiberius Aelius Aurelius.

Another daughter was born on 7 March 150, Annia Aurelia Galeria Lucilla. At some time between 155 and 161, probably soon after 155, Marcus's mother Domitia Lucilla died. Faustina probably had another daughter in 151, but the child, Annia Galeria Aurelia Faustina, might not have been born until 153. Another son, Tiberius Aelius Antoninus, was born in 152. A coin issue celebrates fecunditati Augustae, 'to Augusta's fertility', depicting two girls and an infant. The boy did not survive long, as evidenced by coins from 156, only depicting the two girls. He might have died in 152, the same year as Marcus's sister Cornificia. By 28 March 158, when Marcus replied, another of his children was dead. Marcus thanked the temple synod, 'even though this turned out otherwise'. The child's name is unknown. In 159 and 160, Faustina gave birth to daughters: Fadilla and Cornificia, named respectively after Faustina's and Marcus's dead sisters.

=== Antoninus Pius's last years ===
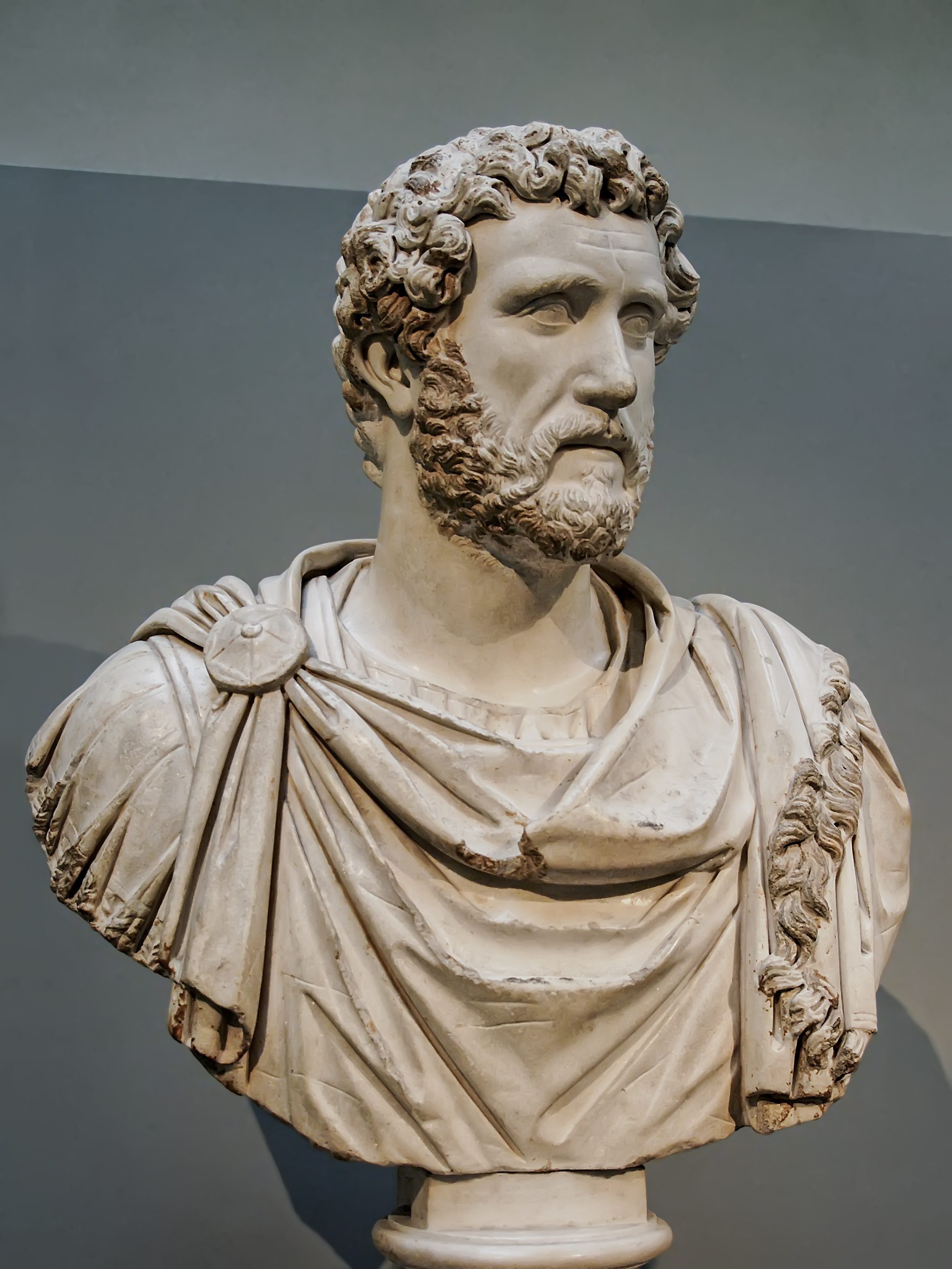
Bust of Antoninus Pius, British Museum

Lucius started his political career as a quaestor in 153. He was consul in 154, and was consul again with Marcus in 161. Lucius had no other titles, except that of 'son of Augustus'. Lucius had a markedly different personality from Marcus: he enjoyed sports of all kinds, but especially hunting and wrestling; he took obvious pleasure in the circus games and gladiatorial fights. (Note: Although part of the biographer's account of Lucius is fictionalised (probably to mimic Nero, whose birthday Lucius shared) and another part poorly compiled from a better biographical source, scholars have accepted these biographical details as accurate.) He did not marry until 164.

In 156, Antoninus turned 70. He found it difficult to keep himself upright without stays. He started nibbling on dry bread to give him the strength to stay awake through his morning receptions. As Antoninus aged, Marcus would take on more administrative duties, more still when he became the praetorian prefect (an office that was as much secretarial as military) when Marcus Gavius Maximus died in 156 or 157. In 160, Marcus and Lucius were designated joint consuls for the following year. Antoninus may have already been ill.

Two days before his death, the biographer reports, Antoninus was at his ancestral estate at Lorium, in Etruria, about 19 kilometres (12 mi) from Rome. He ate Alpine cheese at dinner quite greedily. In the night he vomited; he had a fever the next day. The day after that, 7 March 161, he summoned the imperial council, and passed the state and his daughter to Marcus. The emperor gave the keynote to his life in the last word that he uttered when the tribune of the night-watch came to ask the password – 'aequanimitas' (equanimity). He then turned over, as if going to sleep, and died. His death closed out the longest reign since Augustus, surpassing Tiberius by a couple of months.

== Emperor (161 – 180) ==
=== Accession of Marcus Aurelius and Lucius Verus (161) ===
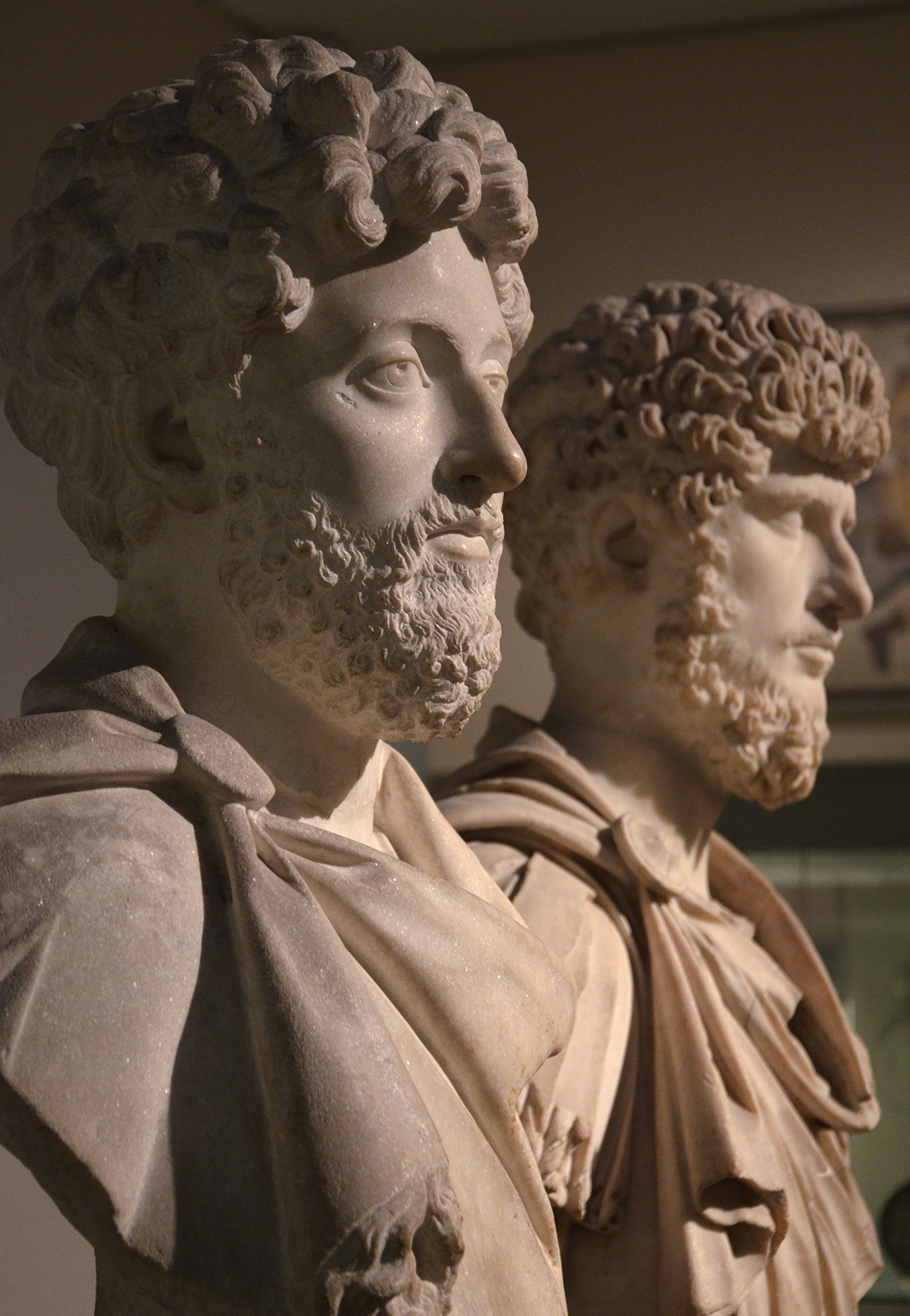
Busts of the co-emperors Marcus Aurelius (left) and Lucius Verus (right), British Museum

After Antoninus died in 161, Marcus was effectively sole ruler of the Empire. The formalities of the position would follow. The Senate would soon grant him the name Augustus and the title imperator, and he would soon be formally elected as pontifex maximus, chief priest of the official cults. Marcus made some show of resistance: the biographer writes that he was 'compelled' to take imperial power. This may have been a genuine horror imperii, 'fear of imperial power'. Marcus, with his preference for the philosophic life, found the imperial office unappealing. His training as a Stoic however, had made the choice clear to him that it was his duty.

Although Marcus showed no personal affection for Hadrian (significantly, he does not thank him in the first book of his Meditations), he presumably believed it his duty to enact the man's succession plans. Thus, although the Senate planned to confirm Marcus alone, he refused to take office unless Lucius received equal powers. The Senate accepted, granting Lucius the imperium, the tribunician power, and the title Augustus. Marcus became, in official titulature, Imperator Caesar Marcus Aurelius Antoninus Augustus; Lucius, forgoing his name Commodus and taking Marcus's family name Verus, became Imperator Caesar Lucius Aurelius Verus Augustus. (Note: These name-swaps have proven so confusing that even the Historia Augusta, our main source for the period, cannot keep them straight. The 4th-century ecclesiastical historian Eusebius of Caesarea shows even more confusion. The mistaken belief that Lucius had the name 'Verus' before becoming emperor has proven especially popular.) It was the first time that Rome was ruled by two emperors. (Note: There was, however, much precedent. The consulate was a twin magistracy, and earlier emperors had often had a subordinate lieutenant with many imperial offices (under Antoninus, the lieutenant had been Marcus). Many emperors had planned a joint succession in the past: Augustus planned to leave Gaius and Lucius Caesar as joint emperors on his death; Tiberius wished to have Gaius Caligula and Tiberius Gemellus do so as well; Claudius left the empire to Nero and Britannicus, imagining that they would accept equal rank. All of these arrangements had ended in failure, either through premature death (Gaius and Lucius Caesar) or judicial murder (Gemellus by Caligula and Britannicus by Nero).)

In spite of their nominal equality, Marcus held more auctoritas, or 'authority', than Lucius. He had been consul once more than Lucius, he had shared in Antoninus's rule, and he alone was pontifex maximus. It would have been clear to the public which emperor was the more senior. As the biographer wrote: "Verus obeyed Marcus [...] as a lieutenant obeys a proconsul or a governor obeys the emperor".

Immediately after their Senate confirmation, the emperors proceeded to the Castra Praetoria, the camp of the Praetorian Guard. Lucius addressed the assembled troops, which then acclaimed the pair as imperatores. Then, like every new emperor since Claudius, Lucius promised the troops a special donativum. This donative, however, was twice the size of those past: 20,000 sesterces (5,000 denarii) per capita, with more to officers. In return for this bounty, equivalent to several years' pay, the troops swore an oath to protect the emperors. The ceremony was perhaps not entirely necessary, given that Marcus's accession had been peaceful and unopposed, but it was good insurance against later military troubles. Upon his accession he also devalued the Roman currency. He decreased the silver purity of the denarius from 83.5% to 79% – the silver weight dropping from 2.68 g (0.095 oz) to 2.57 g (0.091 oz).

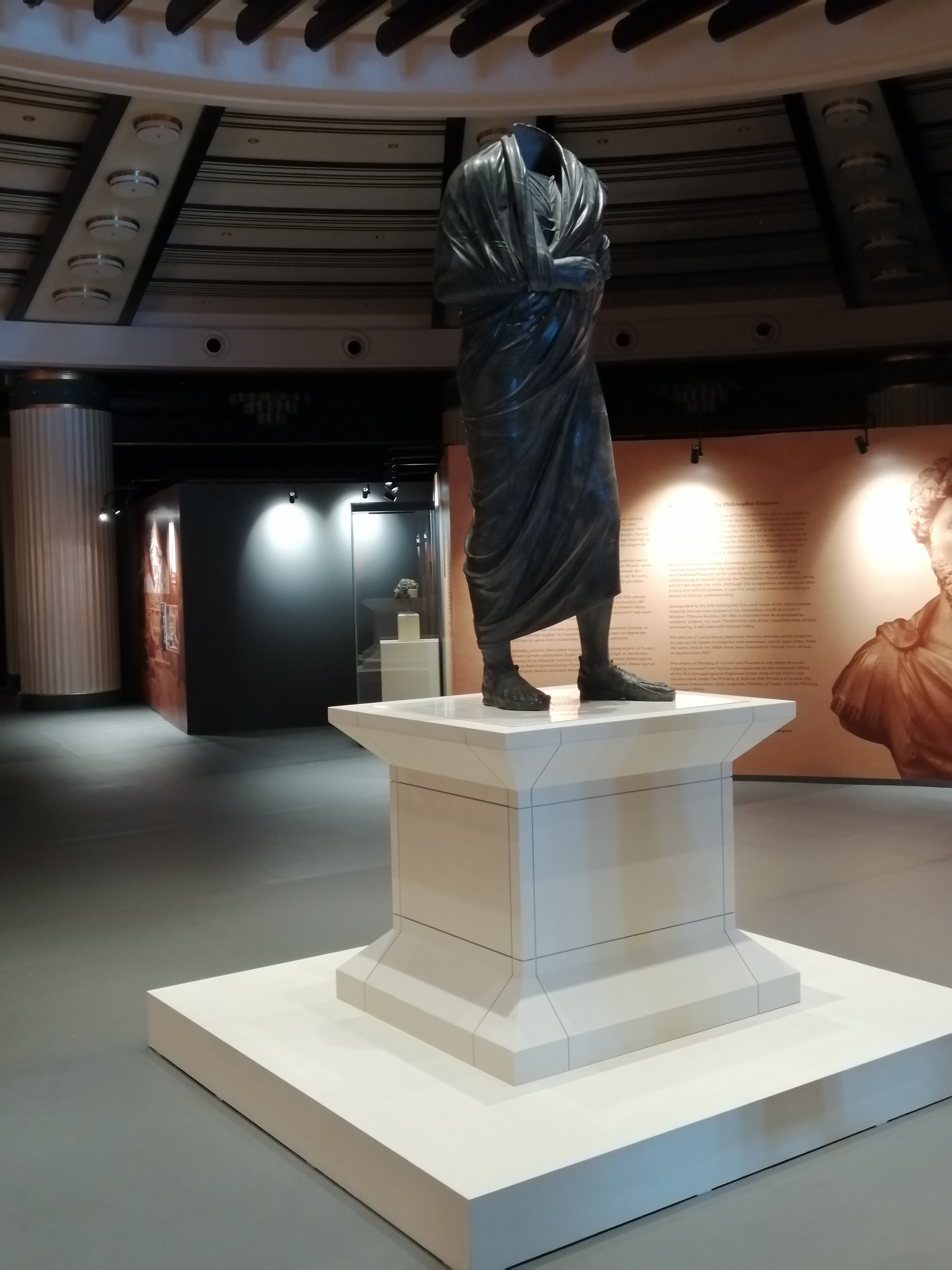
Marcus Aurelius Statue, Nation's Library in Turkey

Antoninus's funeral ceremonies were, in the words of the biographer, 'elaborate'. If his funeral followed those of his predecessors, his body would have been cremated on a pyre at the Campus Martius, and his spirit would have been seen as ascending to the gods' home in the heavens. Marcus and Lucius nominated their father for deification. In contrast to their behaviour during Antoninus's campaign to deify Hadrian, the Senate did not oppose the emperors' wishes. A flamen, or cultic priest, was appointed to minister the cult of the deified Divus Antoninus. Antoninus's remains were laid to rest in Hadrian's mausoleum, beside the remains of Marcus's children and of Hadrian himself. The temple he had dedicated to his wife, Diva Faustina, became the Temple of Antoninus and Faustina. It survives as the church of San Lorenzo in Miranda.

In accordance with his will, Antoninus's fortune passed on to Faustina. (Marcus had little need of his wife's fortune. Indeed, at his accession, Marcus transferred part of his mother's estate to his nephew, Ummius Quadratus.) Faustina was three months pregnant at her husband's accession. During the pregnancy she dreamed of giving birth to two serpents, one fiercer than the other. On 31 August, she gave birth at Lanuvium to twins: T. Aurelius Fulvus Antoninus and Lucius Aurelius Commodus. (Note: The biographer relates the scurrilous (and, in the judgement of Anthony Birley, untrue) rumour that Commodus was an illegitimate child born of a union between Faustina and a gladiator.) Aside from the fact that the twins shared Caligula's birthday, the omens were favourable, and the astrologers drew positive horoscopes for the children. The births were celebrated on the imperial coinage.

=== Early rule ===
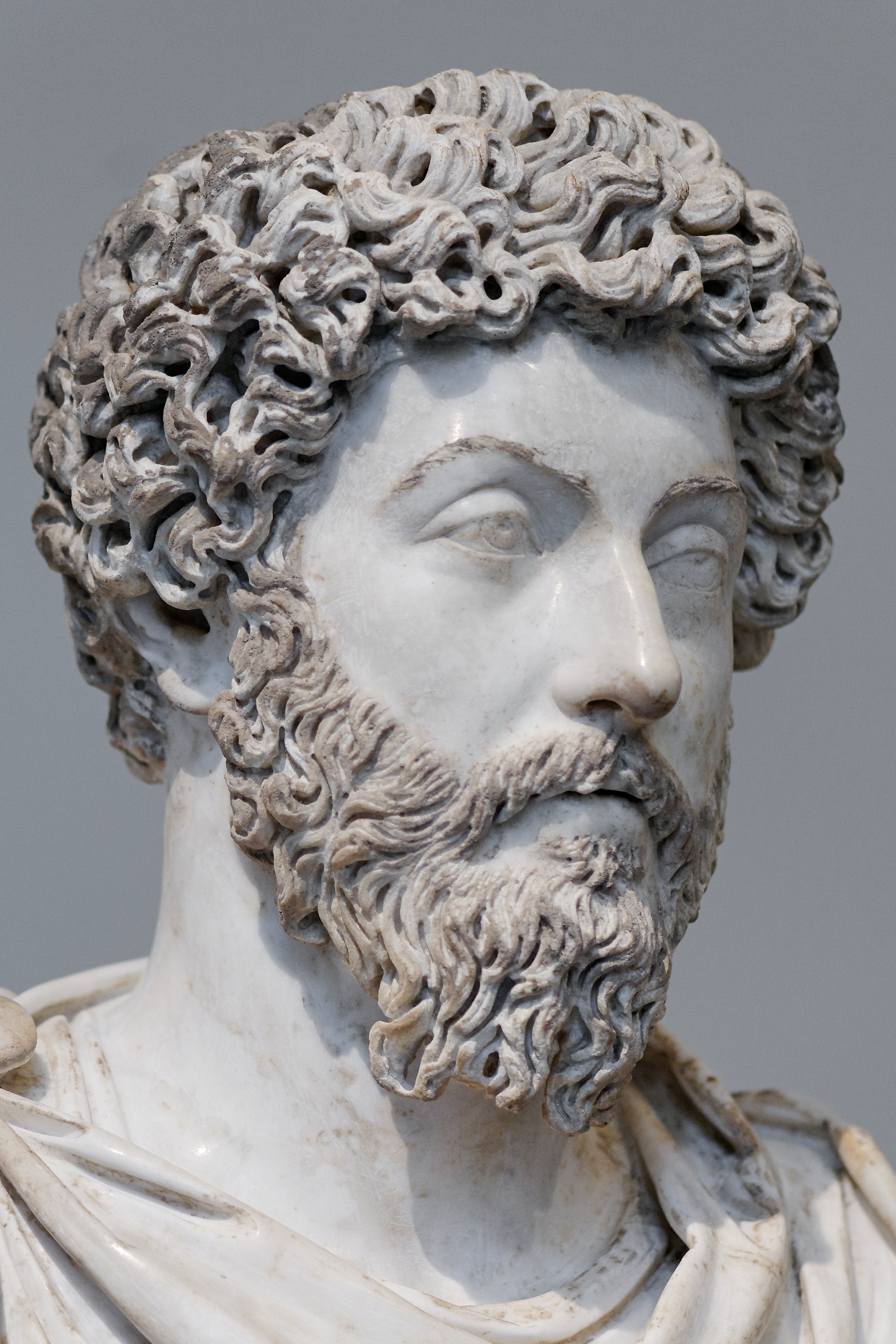
Bust of Marcus Aurelius, AD 161-169, Metropolitan Museum of Art, New York

Soon after the emperor's accession, Marcus's eleven-year-old daughter, Annia Lucilla, was betrothed to Lucius (in spite of the fact that he was, formally, her uncle). At the ceremonies commemorating the event, new provisions were made for the support of poor children, along the lines of earlier imperial foundations. Marcus and Lucius proved popular with the people of Rome, who strongly approved of their civiliter ("lacking pomp") behaviour. The emperors permitted free speech, evidenced by the fact that the comedy writer Marullus was able to criticise them without suffering retribution. As the biographer wrote, "No one missed the lenient ways of Pius".

Marcus replaced a number of the empire's major officials. The ab epistulis Sextus Caecilius Crescens Volusianus, in charge of the imperial correspondence, was replaced with Titus Varius Clemens. Clemens was from the frontier province of Pannonia and had served in the war in Mauretania. Recently, he had served as procurator of five provinces. He was a man suited for a time of military crisis. Lucius Volusius Maecianus, Marcus's former tutor, had been prefectural governor of Egypt at Marcus's accession. Maecianus was recalled, made senator, and appointed prefect of the treasury (aerarium Saturni). He was made consul soon after. Fronto's son-in-law, Gaius Aufidius Victorinus, was appointed governor of Germania Superior.

Fronto returned to his Roman townhouse at dawn on 28 March, having left his home in Cirta as soon as news of his pupils' accession reached him. He sent a note to the imperial freedman Charilas, asking if he could call on the emperors. Fronto would later explain that he had not dared to write the emperors directly. The tutor was immensely proud of his students. Reflecting on the speech he had written on taking his consulship in 143, when he had praised the young Marcus, Fronto was ebullient: "There was then an outstanding natural ability in you; there is now perfected excellence. There was then a crop of growing corn; there is now a ripe, gathered harvest. What I was hoping for then, I have now. The hope has become a reality". Fronto called on Marcus alone; neither thought to invite Lucius.

Lucius was less esteemed by Fronto than his brother, as his interests were on a lower level. Lucius asked Fronto to adjudicate in a dispute he and his friend Calpurnius were having on the relative merits of two actors. Marcus told Fronto of his reading – Coelius and a little Cicero – and his family. His daughters were in Rome with their great-great-aunt Matidia; Marcus thought the evening air of the country was too cold for them. He asked Fronto for 'some particularly eloquent reading matter, something of your own, or Cato, or Cicero, or Sallust or Gracchus – or some poet, for I need distraction, especially in this kind of way, by reading something that will uplift and diffuse my pressing anxieties.' Marcus's early reign proceeded smoothly; he was able to give himself wholly to philosophy and the pursuit of popular affection. Soon, however, he would find he had many anxieties. It would mean the end of the felicitas temporum ('happy times') that the coinage of 161 had proclaimed.

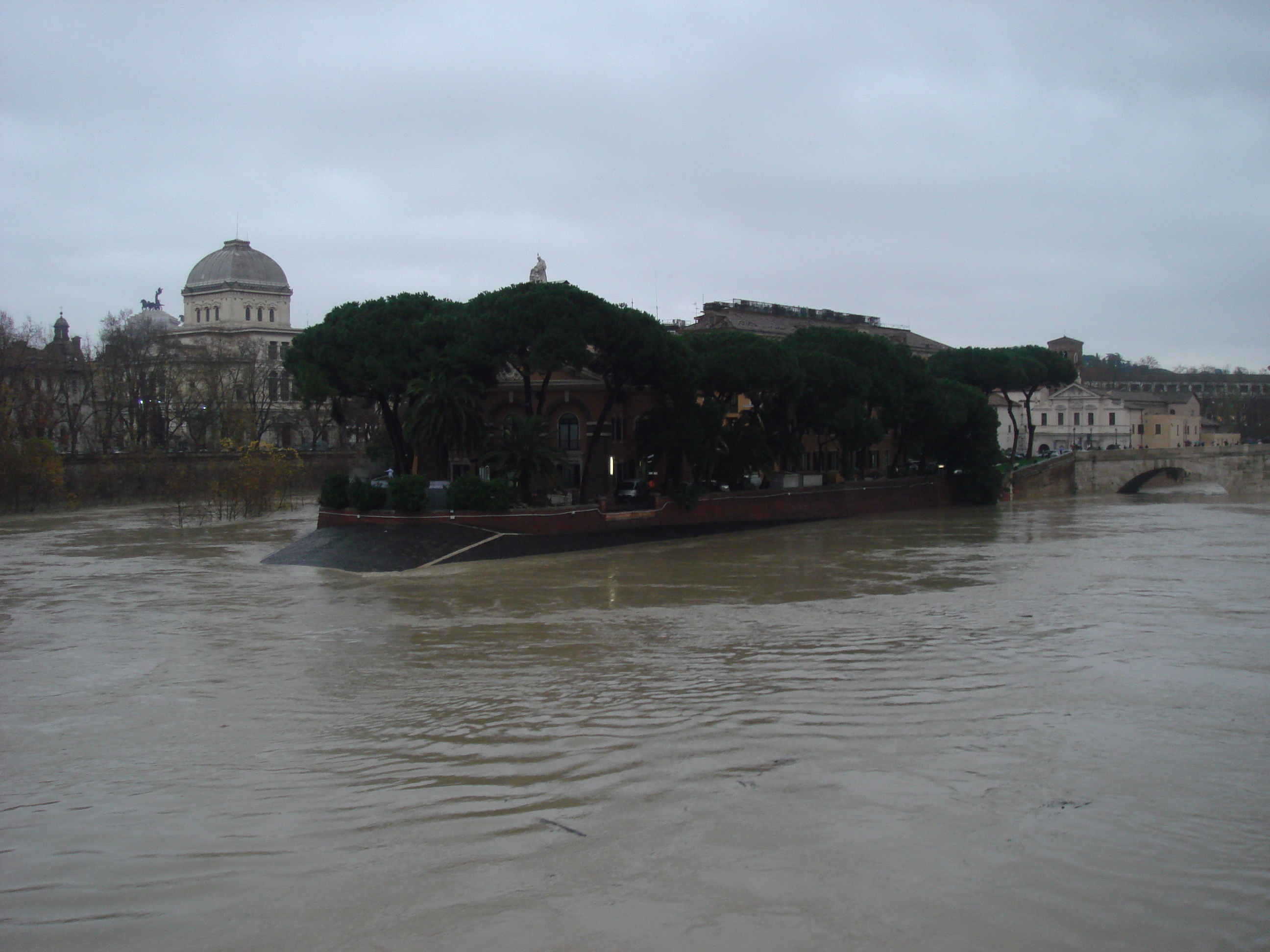
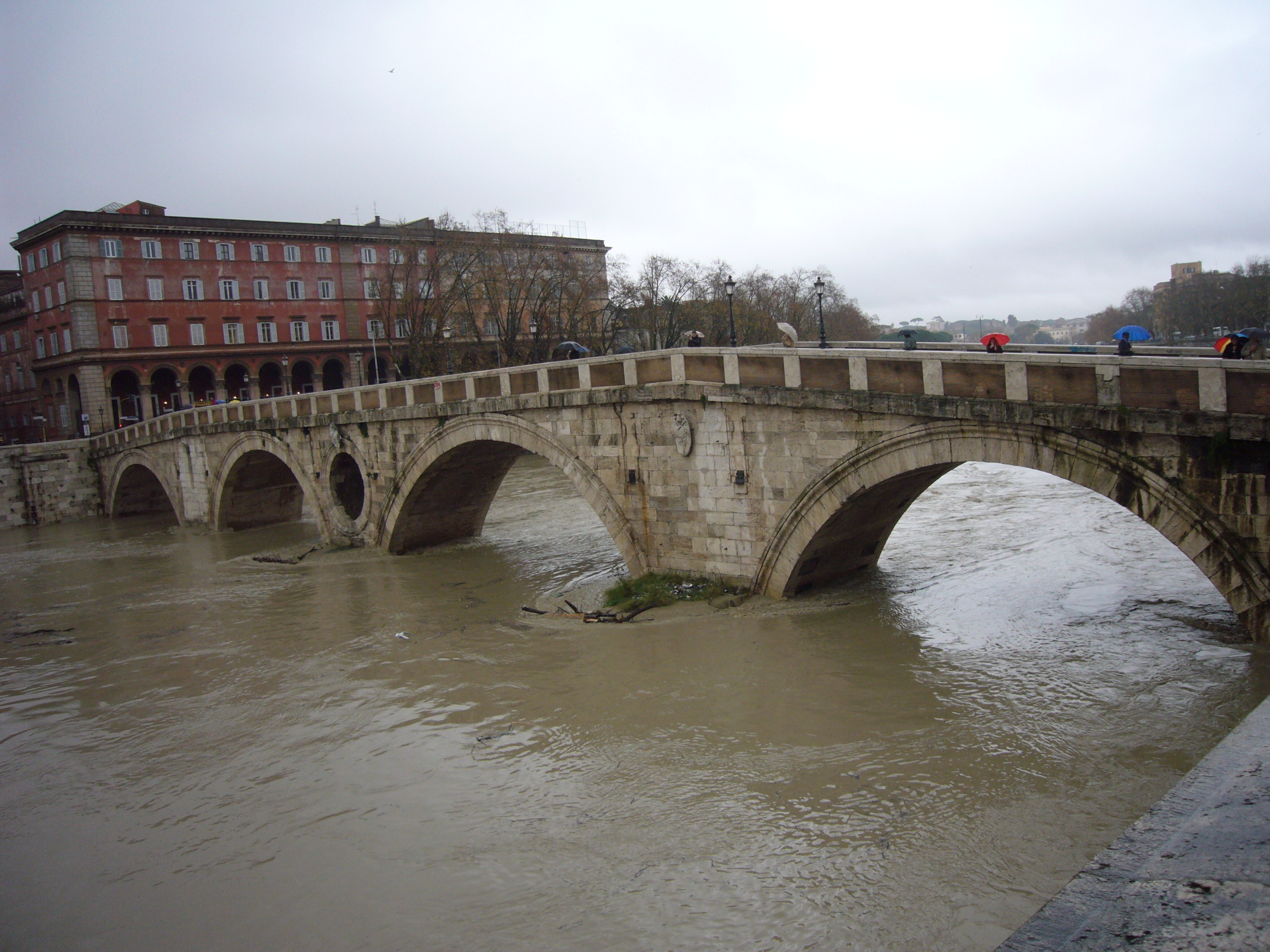
Tiber Island seen at a forty-year high-water mark of the Tiber, December 2008

In either autumn 161 or spring 162, (Note: Because both Lucius and Marcus are said to have taken active part in the recovery (HA Marcus viii. 4–5), the flood must have happened before Lucius's departure for the east in 162; because it appears in the biographer's narrative after Antoninus's funeral has finished and the emperors have settled into their offices, it must not have occurred in the spring of 161. A date in autumn 161 or spring 162 is probable, and, given the normal seasonal distribution of Tiber flooding, the most probable date is in spring 162. (Birley dates the flood to autumn 161.)) the Tiber overflowed its banks, flooding much of Rome. It drowned many animals, leaving the city in famine. Marcus and Lucius gave the crisis their personal attention. (Note: Since AD 15, the river had been administered by a Tiber Conservancy Board, with a consular senator at its head and a permanent staff. In 161, the curator alevi Tiberis et riparum et cloacarum urbis ('Curator of the Tiber Bed and Banks and the City Sewers') was A. Platorius Nepos, son or grandson of the builder of Hadrian's Wall, whose name he shares. He probably had not been particularly incompetent. A more likely candidate for that incompetence is Nepos's likely predecessor, M. Statius Priscus. A military man and consul for 159, Priscus probably looked on the office as little more than 'paid leave'.) In other times of famine, the emperors are said to have provided for the Italian communities out of the Roman granaries.

Fronto's letters continued through Marcus's early reign. Fronto felt that, because of Marcus's prominence and public duties, lessons were more important now than they had ever been before. He believed Marcus was 'beginning to feel the wish to be eloquent once more, in spite of having for a time lost interest in eloquence'. Fronto would again remind his pupil of the tension between his role and his philosophic pretensions: 'Suppose, Caesar, that you can attain to the wisdom of Cleanthes and Zeno, yet, against your will, not the philosopher's woolen cape'.

The early days of Marcus's reign were the happiest of Fronto's life: Marcus was beloved by the people of Rome, an excellent emperor, a fond pupil, and perhaps most importantly, as eloquent as could be wished. Marcus had displayed rhetorical skill in his speech to the senate after an earthquake at Cyzicus. It had conveyed the drama of the disaster, and the Senate had been awed: "Not more suddenly or violently was the city stirred by the earthquake than the minds of your hearers by your speech". Fronto was hugely pleased.

=== War with Parthia (161–166) ===
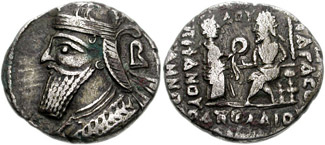
Coin of Vologases IV of Parthia. Inscription: above ΒΑΣΙΛΕΩΣ ΒΑΣΙΛΕΩΝ ΔΟΥ, right ΑΡΣΑΚΟΥ ΒΟΛΑΓΑΣΟΥ, left ΕΠΙΦΑΝΟΥΣ ΦΙΛΕΛΛΗΝΟΣ, below ΔΙΟΥ (Greek inscription for KING OF KINGS – ARSAKIS VOLAGASES – ILLUSTRIUS PHILELLENE). Year ΔΟΥ = ΥΟΔ΄ = 474 = 162–163.

On his deathbed, Antoninus spoke of nothing but the state and the foreign kings who had wronged him. One of those kings, Vologases IV of Parthia, made his move in late summer or early autumn 161. Vologases entered the Kingdom of Armenia (then a Roman client state), expelled its king and installed his own – Pacorus, an Arsacid like himself. The governor of Cappadocia, the frontline in all Armenian conflicts, was Marcus Sedatius Severianus, a Gaul with much experience in military matters.

Convinced by the prophet Alexander of Abonoteichus that he could defeat the Parthians easily and win glory for himself, Severianus led a legion (perhaps the IX Hispana) into Armenia, but was trapped by the Parthian general Chosrhoes at Elegeia, a town just beyond the Cappadocian frontiers, high up past the headwaters of the Euphrates. After Severianus made some unsuccessful efforts to engage Chosrhoes, he committed suicide, and his legion was massacred. The campaign had lasted only three days.

There was threat of war on other frontiers as well – in Britain, and in Raetia and Upper Germany, where the Chatti of the Taunus mountains had recently crossed over the limes. Marcus was unprepared. Antoninus seems to have given him no military experience; the biographer writes that Marcus spent the whole of Antoninus's twenty-three-year reign at his emperor's side and not in the provinces, where most previous emperors had spent their early careers. (Note: Alan Cameron adduces the 5th-century writer Sidonius Apollinaris's comment that Marcus commanded 'countless legions' vivente Pio (while Antoninus was alive) while contesting Birley's contention that Marcus had no military experience. (Neither Apollinaris nor the Historia Augusta (Birley's source) are particularly reliable on 2nd-century history.))

More bad news arrived: the Syrian governor's army had been defeated by the Parthians, and retreated in disarray. Reinforcements were dispatched for the Parthian frontier. P. Julius Geminius Marcianus, an African senator commanding X Gemina at Vindobona (Vienna), left for Cappadocia with detachments from the Danubian legions. Three full legions were also sent east: I Minervia from Bonn in Upper Germany, II Adiutrix from Aquincum, and V Macedonica from Troesmis.

The northern frontiers were strategically weakened; frontier governors were told to avoid conflict wherever possible. M. Annius Libo, Marcus's first cousin, was sent to replace the Syrian governor. His first consulship was in 161, so he was probably in his early thirties, and as a patrician, he lacked military experience. Marcus had chosen a reliable man rather than a talented one.

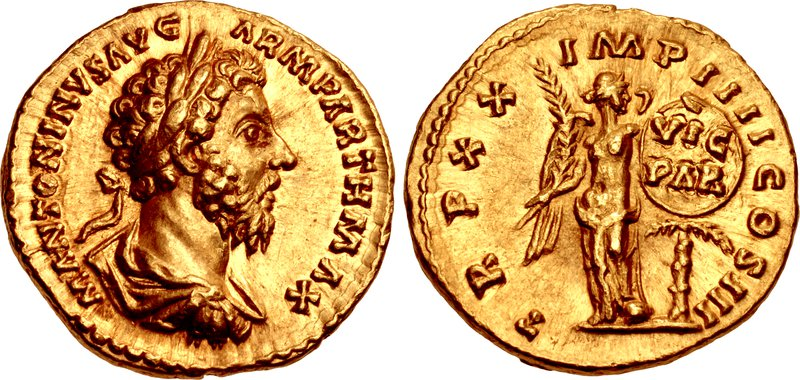
Aureus of Marcus Aurelius (AD 166). On the reverse, Victoria is holding a shield inscribed 'VIC(toria) PAR(thica)', referring to his victory against the Parthians. Inscription: M. ANTONINVS AVG. / TR. P. XX, IMP. IIII, CO[N]S. III.

Marcus took a four-day public holiday at Alsium, a resort town on the coast of Etruria. He was too anxious to relax. Writing to Fronto, he declared that he would not speak about his holiday. Fronto replied: 'What? Do I not know that you went to Alsium with the intention of devoting yourself to games, joking, and complete leisure for four whole days?' He encouraged Marcus to rest, calling on the example of his predecessors (Antoninus had enjoyed exercise in the palaestra, fishing, and comedy), going so far as to write up a fable about the gods' division of the day between morning and evening – Marcus had apparently been spending most of his evenings on judicial matters instead of at leisure. Marcus could not take Fronto's advice. 'I have duties hanging over me that can hardly be begged off', he wrote back. Marcus Aurelius put on Fronto's voice to chastise himself: ''Much good has my advice done you', you will say!' He had rested, and would rest often, but 'this devotion to duty! Who knows better than you how demanding it is!'

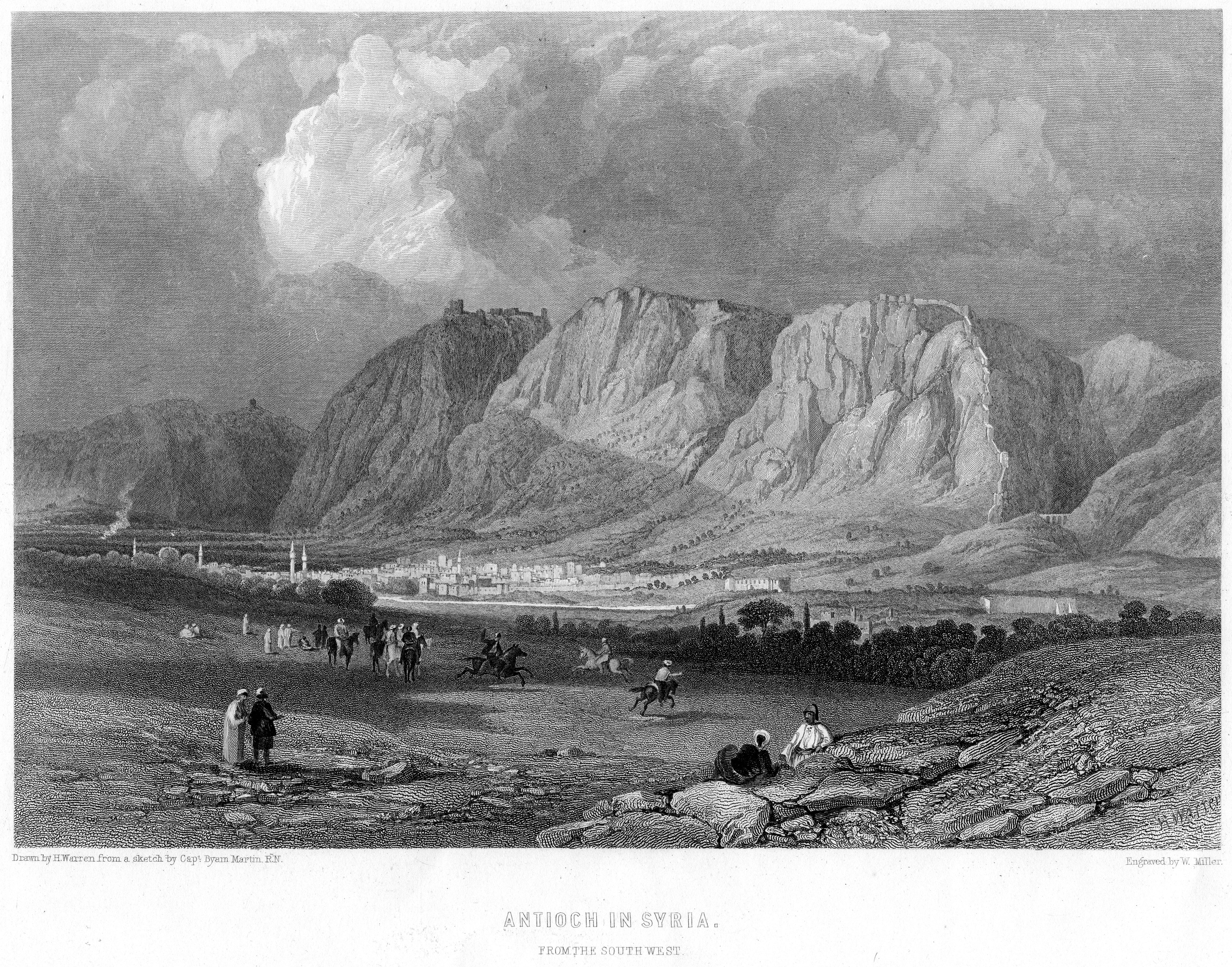
The dissolute Syrian army spent more time in Antioch's open-air taverns than with their units (engraving by William Miller after a drawing by H. Warren from a sketch by Captain Byam Martin, R.N., 1866).

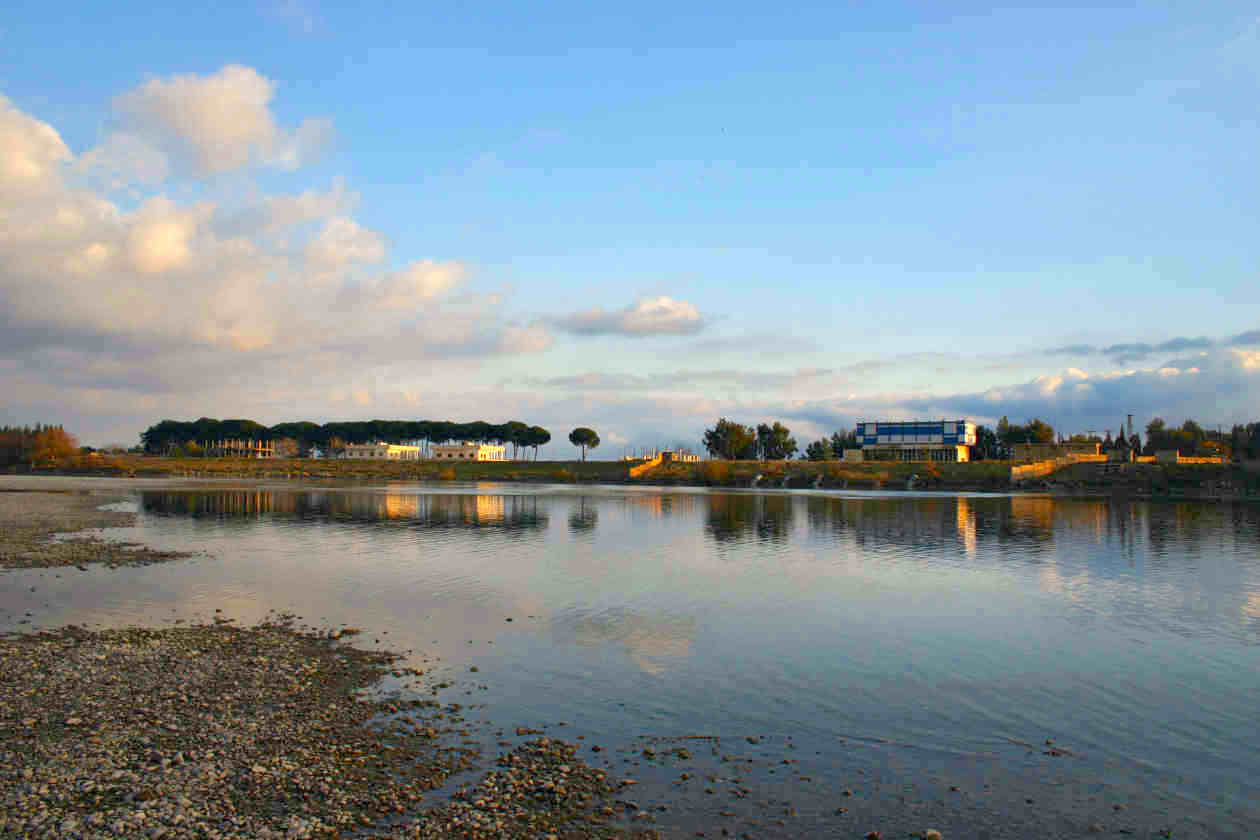
The Euphrates River near Raqqa, Syria

Fronto sent Marcus a selection of reading material, and, to settle his unease over the course of the Parthian war, a long and considered letter, full of historical references. In modern editions of Fronto's works, it is labelled De bello Parthico (On the Parthian War). There had been reverses in Rome's past, Fronto writes, but in the end, Romans had always prevailed over their enemies: 'Always and everywhere [Mars] has changed our troubles into successes and our terrors into triumphs'.

Over the winter of 161–162, news that a rebellion was brewing in Syria arrived and it was decided that Lucius should direct the Parthian war in person. He was stronger and healthier than Marcus, the argument went, and thus more suited to military activity. Lucius's biographer suggests ulterior motives: to restrain Lucius's debaucheries, to make him thrifty, to reform his morals by the terror of war, and to realise that he was an emperor. (Note: Birley believes there is some truth in these considerations.) Whatever the case, the senate gave its assent, and, in the summer of 162, Lucius left. Marcus would remain in Rome, as the city 'demanded the presence of an emperor'.

Lucius spent most of the campaign in Antioch, though he wintered at Laodicea and summered at Daphne, a resort just outside Antioch. Critics decried Lucius's luxurious lifestyle, saying that he had taken to gambling, would 'dice the whole night through', and enjoyed the company of actors. (Note: The whole section of the vita dealing with Lucius's debaucheries (HA Verus iv. 4–6.6), however, is an insertion into a narrative otherwise entirely cribbed from an earlier source. Most of the details are fabricated by the biographer himself, relying on nothing better than his own imagination.) Libo died early in the war; perhaps Lucius had murdered him.

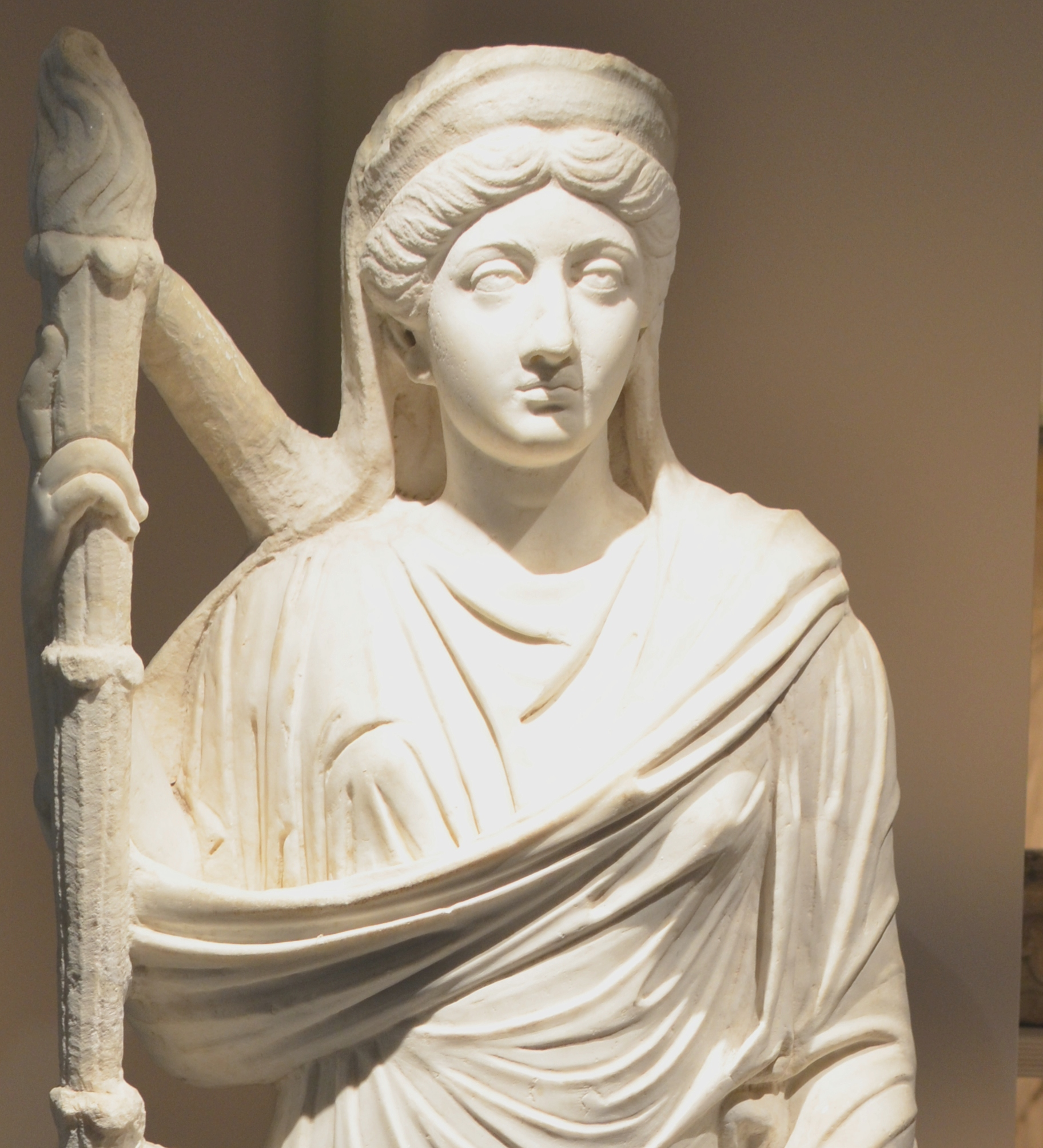
Marble statue of Lucilla, AD 150–200, Bardo National Museum, Tunisia

In the middle of the war, perhaps in autumn 163 or early 164, Lucius made a trip to Ephesus to be married to Marcus's daughter Lucilla. Marcus moved up the date; perhaps he had already heard of Lucius's mistress Panthea. Lucilla's thirteenth birthday was in March 163; whatever the date of her marriage, she was not yet fifteen. Lucilla was accompanied by her mother Faustina and Lucius's uncle (his father's half-brother) M. Vettulenus Civica Barbarus, who was made comes Augusti, 'companion of the emperors'. Marcus may have wanted Civica to watch over Lucius, the job Libo had failed at. Marcus may have planned to accompany them all the way to Smyrna (the biographer says he told the senate he would), but this did not happen. He only accompanied the group as far as Brundisium, where they boarded a ship for the east. He returned to Rome immediately thereafter, and sent out special instructions to his proconsuls not to give the group any official reception.

The Armenian capital Artaxata was captured in 163. At the end of the year, Lucius took the title Armeniacus, despite having never seen combat; Marcus declined to accept the title until the following year. When Lucius was hailed as imperator again, however, Marcus did not hesitate to take the Imperator II with him.

Occupied Armenia was reconstructed on Roman terms. In 164, a new capital, Kaine Polis ('New City'), replaced Artaxata. A new king was installed: a Roman senator of consular rank and Arsacid descent, Gaius Julius Sohaemus. He may not even have been crowned in Armenia; the ceremony may have taken place in Antioch, or even Ephesus. Sohaemus was hailed on the imperial coinage of 164 under the legend Rex armeniis Datus: Lucius sat on a throne with his staff while Sohaemus stood before him, saluting the emperor.

In 163, the Parthians intervened in Osroene, a Roman client in upper Mesopotamia centred on Edessa, and installed their own king on its throne. In response, Roman forces were moved downstream, to cross the Euphrates at a more southerly point. Before the end of 163, however, Roman forces had moved north to occupy Dausara and Nicephorium on the northern, Parthian bank. Soon after the conquest of the north bank of the Euphrates, other Roman forces moved on Osroene from Armenia, taking Anthemusia, a town southwest of Edessa.

In 165, Roman forces moved on Mesopotamia. Edessa was re-occupied, and Mannus, the king deposed by the Parthians, was re-installed. The Parthians retreated to Nisibis, but this too was besieged and captured. The Parthian army dispersed in the Tigris. A second force, under Avidius Cassius and the III Gallica, moved down the Euphrates, and fought a major battle at Dura.

By the end of the year, Cassius's army had reached the twin metropolises of Mesopotamia: Seleucia on the right bank of the Tigris and Ctesiphon on the left. Ctesiphon was taken and its royal palace set to flame. The citizens of Seleucia, still largely Greek (the city had been commissioned and settled as a capital of the Seleucid Empire, one of Alexander the Great's successor kingdoms), opened its gates to the invaders. The city was sacked nonetheless, leaving a black mark on Lucius's reputation. Excuses were sought, or invented: the official version had it that the Seleucids broke faith first.

Cassius's army, although suffering from a shortage of supplies and the effects of a plague contracted in Seleucia, made it back to Roman territory safely. Lucius took the title Parthicus Maximus, and he and Marcus were hailed as imperatores again, earning the title 'imp. III'. Cassius's army returned to the field in 166, crossing over the Tigris into Media. Lucius took the title 'Medicus', and the emperors were again hailed as imperatores, becoming 'imp. IV' in imperial titulature. Marcus took the Parthicus Maximus now, after another tactful delay. On 12 October of that year, Marcus proclaimed two of his sons, Annius and Commodus, as his heirs.

=== War with Germanic tribes (166–180) ===
Scenes from the Marcomannic Wars, 176–180 (bas reliefs from the Arch of Marcus Aurelius, now in the Capitoline Museums)

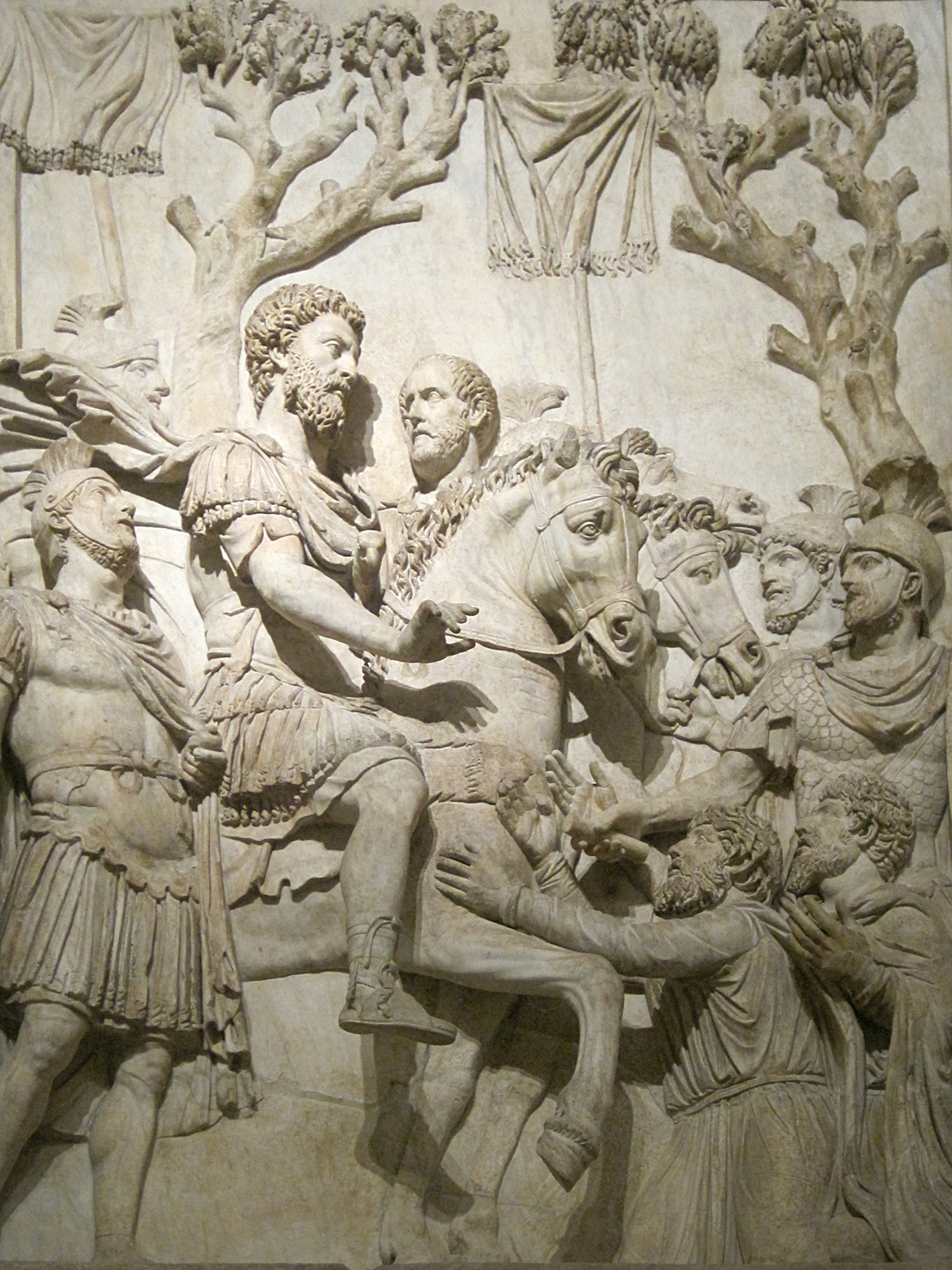
Marcus Aurelius receiving the submission of the vanquished, with raised vexillum standards

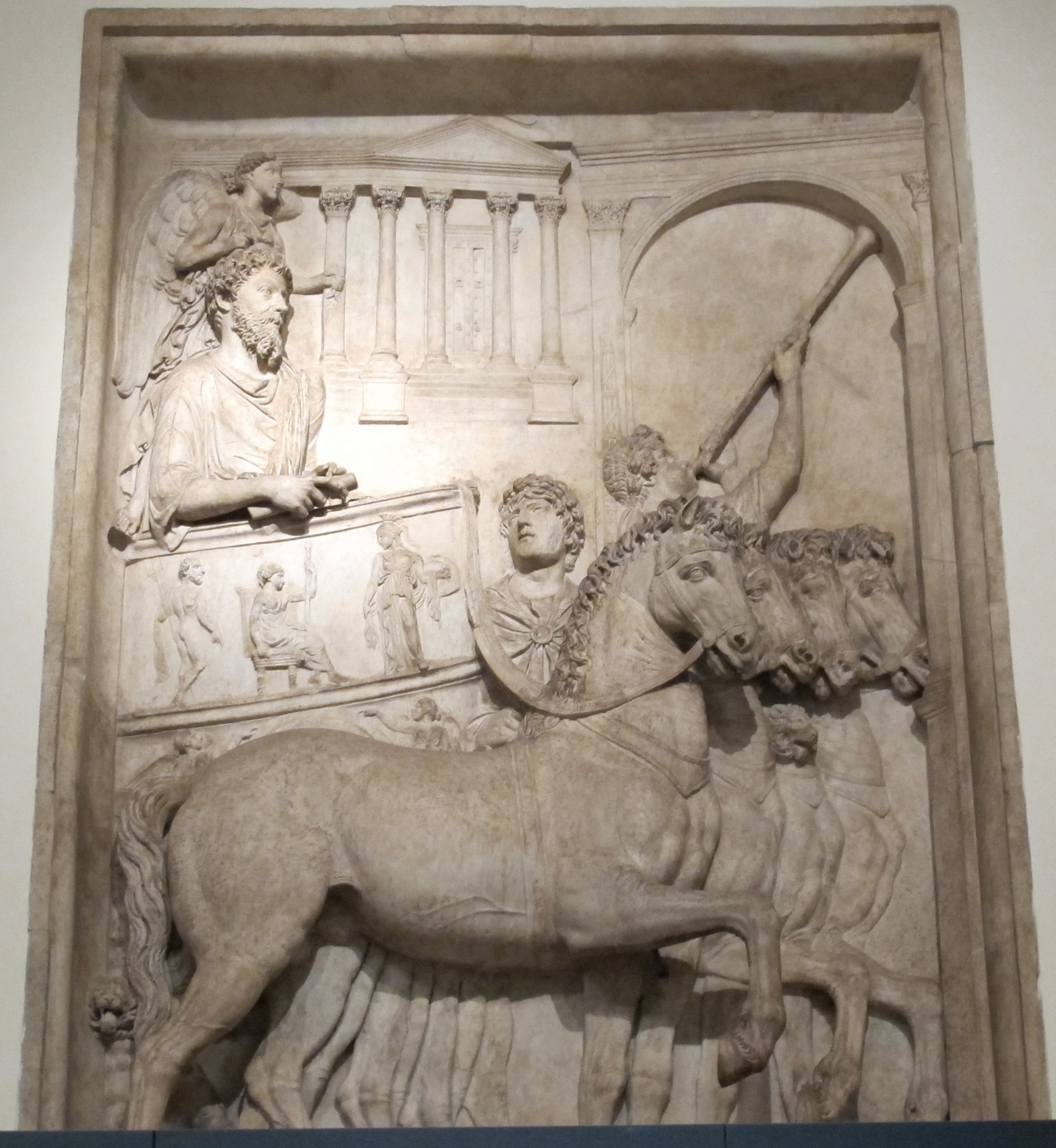
Marcus Aurelius celebrating his triumph over Rome's enemies in 176, riding in a quadriga chariot

During the early 160s, Fronto's son-in-law Victorinus was stationed as a legate in Germany. He was there with his wife and children (another child had stayed with Fronto and his wife in Rome). The condition on the northern frontier looked grave. A frontier post had been destroyed, and it looked like all the peoples of central and northern Europe were in turmoil. There was corruption among the officers: Victorinus had to ask for the resignation of a legionary legate who was taking bribes.

Experienced governors had been replaced by friends and relatives of the imperial family. Lucius Dasumius Tullius Tuscus, a distant relative of Hadrian, was in Upper Pannonia, succeeding the experienced Marcus Nonius Macrinus. Lower Pannonia was under the obscure Tiberius Haterius Saturnius. Marcus Servilius Fabianus Maximus was shuffled from Lower Moesia to Upper Moesia when Marcus Iallius Bassus had joined Lucius in Antioch. Lower Moesia was filled by Pontius Laelianus' son. The Dacias were still divided in three, governed by a praetorian senator and two procurators. The peace could not hold long; Lower Pannonia did not even have a legion.

Starting in the 160s, Germanic tribes, and other nomadic people launched raids along the northern border, particularly into Gaul and across the Danube. This new impetus westwards was probably due to attacks from tribes further east. A first invasion by the Chatti in the province of Germania Superior was repulsed in 162.

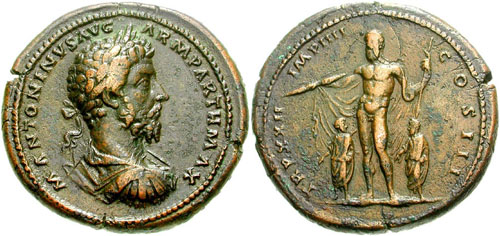
Bronze medallion of Marcus Aurelius (AD 168). The reverse depicts Jupiter, flanked by Marcus and Lucius Verus. Inscription: M. ANTONINVS AVG. ARM. PARTH. MAX. / TR. P. XXII, IMP. IIII, COS III.

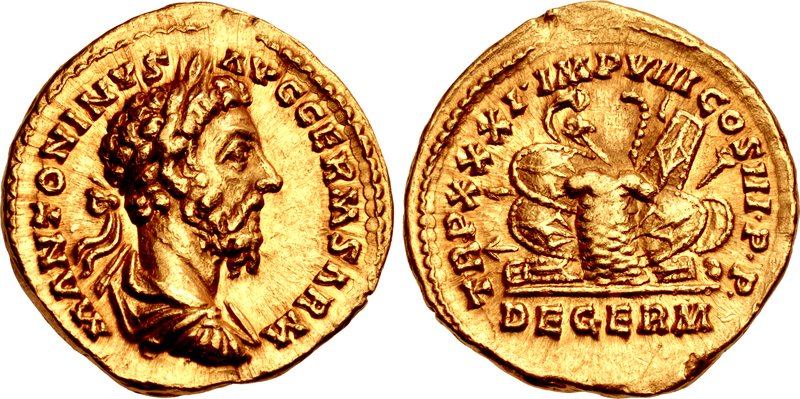
Aureus of Marcus (176–177). The pile of trophies on the reverse celebrates the end of the Marcomannic Wars. Inscription: M. ANTONINVS AVG. GERM. SARM. / TR. P. XXXI, IMP. VIII, CO[N]S. III, P. P.

Far more dangerous was the invasion of 166, when the Marcomanni of Bohemia, clients of the Roman Empire since AD 19, crossed the Danube together with the Lombards and other Germanic tribes. Soon thereafter, the Iranian Iazyges attacked between the Danube and the Theiss rivers.

The Costoboci, coming from the Carpathian area, invaded Moesia, Macedonia, and Greece. After a long struggle, Marcus managed to push back the invaders. Numerous members of Germanic tribes settled in frontier regions like Dacia, Pannonia, Germany, and Italy itself. This was not a new thing, but this time the numbers of settlers required the creation of two new frontier provinces on the left shore of the Danube, Sarmatia and Marcomannia, including today's Czech Republic, Slovakia, and Hungary. Some Germanic tribes who settled in Ravenna revolted and managed to seize possession of the city. For this reason, Marcus decided not only against bringing more barbarians into Italy, but even banished those who had previously been brought there. In 168, the two emperors embarked on a new military campaign, expelling the invading Marcomanni and Quadi from Aquileia. Lucius Verus fell ill and died on his way back to Rome, probably due to the plague, in January or February 169.

=== Legal and administrative work ===
Like many emperors, Marcus spent most of his time addressing matters of law such as petitions and hearing disputes, but unlike many of his predecessors, he was already proficient in imperial administration when he assumed power. He took great care in the theory and practice of legislation. Professional jurists called him "an emperor most skilled in the law" and "a most prudent and conscientiously just emperor". He showed marked interest in three areas of the law: the manumission of slaves, the guardianship of orphans and minors, and the choice of city councillors (decuriones).

Marcus showed a great deal of respect to the Roman Senate and routinely asked them for permission to spend money even though he did not need to do so as the absolute ruler of the Empire. In one speech, Marcus himself reminded the Senate that the imperial palace where he lived was not truly his possession but theirs. In 168, he revalued the denarius, increasing the silver purity from 79% to 82% – the actual silver weight increasing from 2.57–2.67 g (0.091–0.094 oz). However, two years later he reverted to the previous values because of the military crises facing the empire.

==== Trade with Han China and outbreak of plague ====
A possible contact with the Chinese Han dynasty (202 BC – 220 AD) occurred in 166 when a Roman traveller visited the Han court, claiming to be an ambassador representing "Andun" (Chinese: 安敦), ruler of Daqin, who can be identified either with Marcus or his predecessor Antoninus. In addition to Republican-era Roman glasswares found at Guangzhou along the South China Sea, Roman golden medallions made during the reign of Antoninus and perhaps even Marcus have been found at Óc Eo, Vietnam, then part of the Kingdom of Funan near the Chinese province of Jiaozhi (in northern Vietnam). This may have been the port city of Kattigara, described by Ptolemy (c. 150) as being visited by a Greek sailor named Alexander and lying beyond the Golden Chersonese (i.e. Malay Peninsula). (Note: For further information on Óc Eo, see Osborne, Milton. The Mekong: Turbulent Past, Uncertain Future. Crows Nest: Allen & Unwin, 2006, revised edition, first published in 2000. pp. 24–25. ISBN 978-1741148930.) Roman coins from the reigns of Tiberius to Aurelian have been found in Xi'an, the site of the Han capital Chang'an, although the far greater amount of Roman coins in India suggests the Roman maritime trade for purchasing Chinese silk was centred there, not in China or even the overland Silk Road running through Persia.

The Antonine Plague started in Mesopotamia in 165 or 166 at the end of Lucius's campaign against the Parthians. It may have continued into the reign of Commodus. Galen, who was in Rome when the plague spread to the city in 166, mentioned that "fever, diarrhoea, and inflammation of the pharynx, along with dry or pustular eruptions of the skin after nine days" were among the symptoms. It is believed that the plague was smallpox. In the view of historian Rafe de Crespigny, the plagues afflicting the Eastern Han empire of China during the reigns of Emperor Huan of Han (r. 146–168) and Emperor Ling of Han (r. 168–189), which struck in 151, 161, 171, 173, 179, 182, and 185, were perhaps connected to the plague in Rome. Raoul McLaughlin writes that the travel of Roman subjects to the Han court in 166 may have started a new era of Roman–Far East trade. However, it was also a "harbinger of something much more ominous". According to McLaughlin, the disease caused "irreparable" damage to the Roman maritime trade in the Indian Ocean as proven by the archaeological record spanning from Egypt to India, as well as significantly decreased Roman commercial activity in Southeast Asia.

=== Attitude towards Christians ===
In the first two centuries of the Christian era, local Roman officials were largely responsible for the persecution of Christians. In the second century, the emperors treated Christianity as a local problem to be dealt with by their subordinates. The number and severity of persecutions of Christians in various locations of the empire seemingly increased during the reign of Marcus Aurelius. The extent to which the emperor himself directed, encouraged, or was aware of these persecutions is unclear and much debated by historians.

Marcus Aurelius mentions Christians only once in his personal writings, the Meditations. In Book XI.3, he criticizes what he perceives as their theatrical approach to martyrdom, writing that readiness for death "must spring from a man's inner judgment, and not be the result of mere opposition [as is the case with the Christians]. It must be associated with deliberation and dignity and, if others too are to be convinced, with nothing like stage-heroics."

A letter purportedly from Marcus Aurelius to the Roman Senate, included in Justin Martyr's First Apology, describes a battlefield incident where Marcus allegedly credited Christian prayer with saving his army when "water poured from heaven," and subsequently requested that the Senate cease persecution of Christians. However, modern scholars widely consider this letter to be inauthentic, likely composed by Justin Martyr or another Christian author rather than by Marcus Aurelius himself. Contemporary non-Christian sources, including the historian Cassius Dio, attribute the same "rain miracle" to an Egyptian magician named Harnuphis who accompanied the Roman legions.

=== Death and succession (180) ===
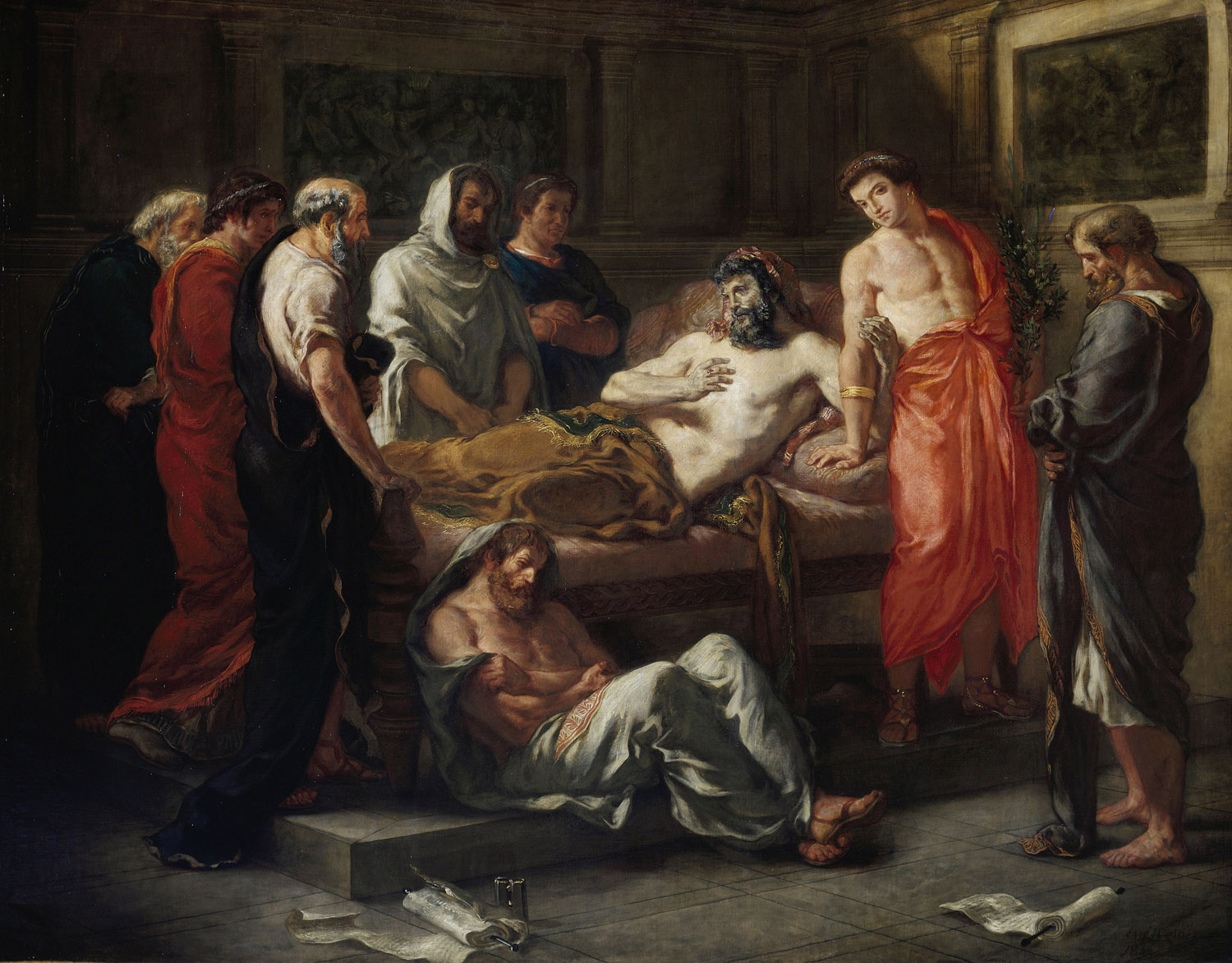
Last Words of the Emperor Marcus Aurelius (1844) by Eugène Delacroix

Marcus Aurelius died at the age of 58 on 17 March 180 of unknown causes in his military quarters either in the city of Vindobona (province of Pannonia Superior, today Vienna) or near Sirmium (province of Pannonia Inferior, modern Sremska Mitrovica). (Note: Vindobona as Marcus Aurelius's death place is mentioned by Aurelius Victor in his De Caesaribus (16.14), Sirmium on the other hand in Tertullian's Apologeticum (25)) He was immediately deified and his ashes were returned to Rome, where they rested in Hadrian's mausoleum (modern Castel Sant'Angelo) until the Visigoth sack of the city in 410. His campaigns against Germans and Sarmatians were also commemorated by a column and a temple built in Rome. Some scholars consider his death to be the end of the Pax Romana.

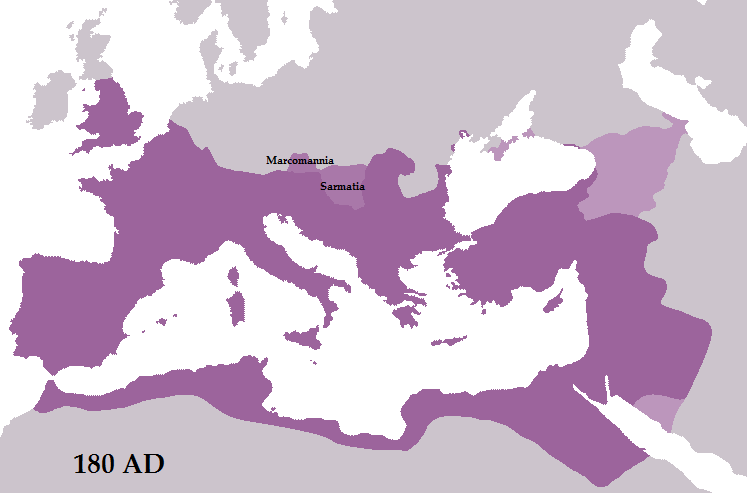
The Roman Empire at the death of Marcus Aurelius in 180, represented in purple. His annexation of lands of the Marcomanni and the Jazyges – perhaps to be provincially called Marcomannia and Sarmatia – was cut short in 175 by the revolt of Avidius Cassius and by his death. The light pink territory represents Roman dependencies: Armenia, Colchis, Iberia, and Albania.

Marcus was succeeded by his son Commodus, whom he had named Caesar in 166 and with whom he had jointly ruled since 177. Biological sons of the emperor, if there were any, were considered heirs; however, it was only the second time that a "non-adoptive" son had succeeded his father, the only other having been a century earlier when Vespasian was succeeded by his son Titus. Historians have criticised the succession to Commodus, citing Commodus' erratic behaviour and lack of political and military acumen. At the end of his history of Marcus's reign, Cassius Dio wrote an encomium to the emperor, and described the transition to Commodus in his own lifetime with sorrow:

[Marcus] did not meet with the good fortune that he deserved, for he was not strong in body and was involved in a multitude of troubles throughout practically his entire reign. But for my part, I admire him all the more for this very reason, that amid unusual and extraordinary difficulties he both survived himself and preserved the empire. Just one thing prevented him from being completely happy, namely, that after rearing and educating his son in the best possible way he was vastly disappointed in him. This matter must be our next topic; for our history now descends from a kingdom of gold to one of iron and rust, as affairs did for the Romans of that day.

–Dio lxxi. 36.3–4

Dio adds that from Marcus's first days as counsellor to Antoninus to his final days as emperor of Rome, "he remained the same [person] and did not change in the least."

Michael Grant, in The Climax of Rome, writes of Commodus:

The youth turned out to be very erratic, or at least so anti-traditional that disaster was inevitable. But whether or not Marcus ought to have known this to be so, the rejections of his son's claims in favour of someone else would almost certainly have involved one of the civil wars which were to proliferate so disastrously around future successions.

== Philosophy ==
=== Meditations ===
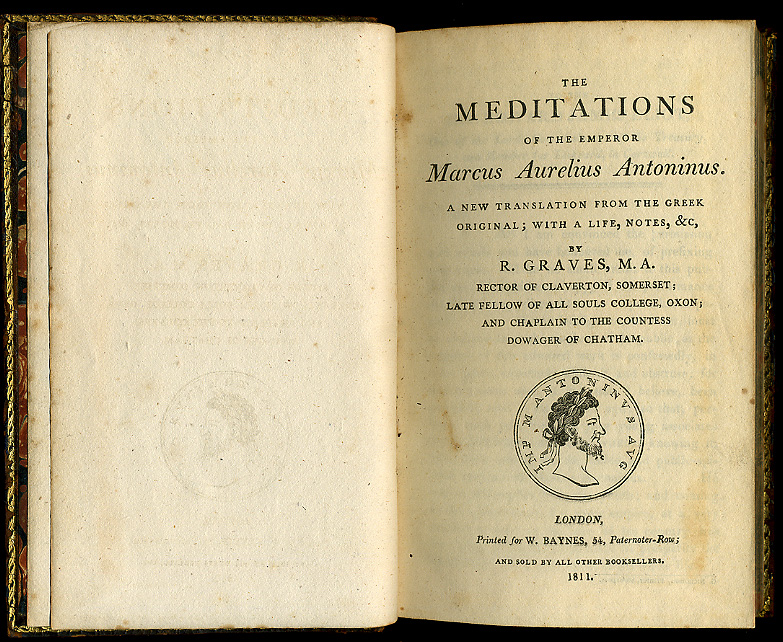
First page of the 1811 English translation by Richard Graves

While on campaign between 170 and 180, Marcus wrote his Meditations in Greek as a source for his own guidance and self-improvement. The original title of this work, if it had one, is unknown. Meditations – as well as other titles including To Himself – were adopted later. It was a favourite of Frederick the Great, John Stuart Mill, Matthew Arnold, and Goethe. It has been considered by many commentators to be one of the greatest works of philosophy. Meditations sold 16,000 copies in 2012. In 2019, 100,000 copies were sold.

It is not known how widely Marcus's writings were circulated after his death. There are stray references in the ancient literature to the popularity of his precepts, and Julian the Apostate was well aware of his reputation as a philosopher, though he does not specifically mention Meditations. It survived in the scholarly traditions of the Eastern Church, and the first surviving quotes of the book, as well as the first known reference to it by name (Marcus's writings to himself) are from Arethas of Caesarea in the 10th century and in the Byzantine Suda (perhaps inserted by Arethas himself). It was first published in 1558 in Zurich by Wilhelm Xylander, from a manuscript reportedly lost shortly afterwards. The oldest surviving complete manuscript copy is in the Vatican library and dates to the 14th century.

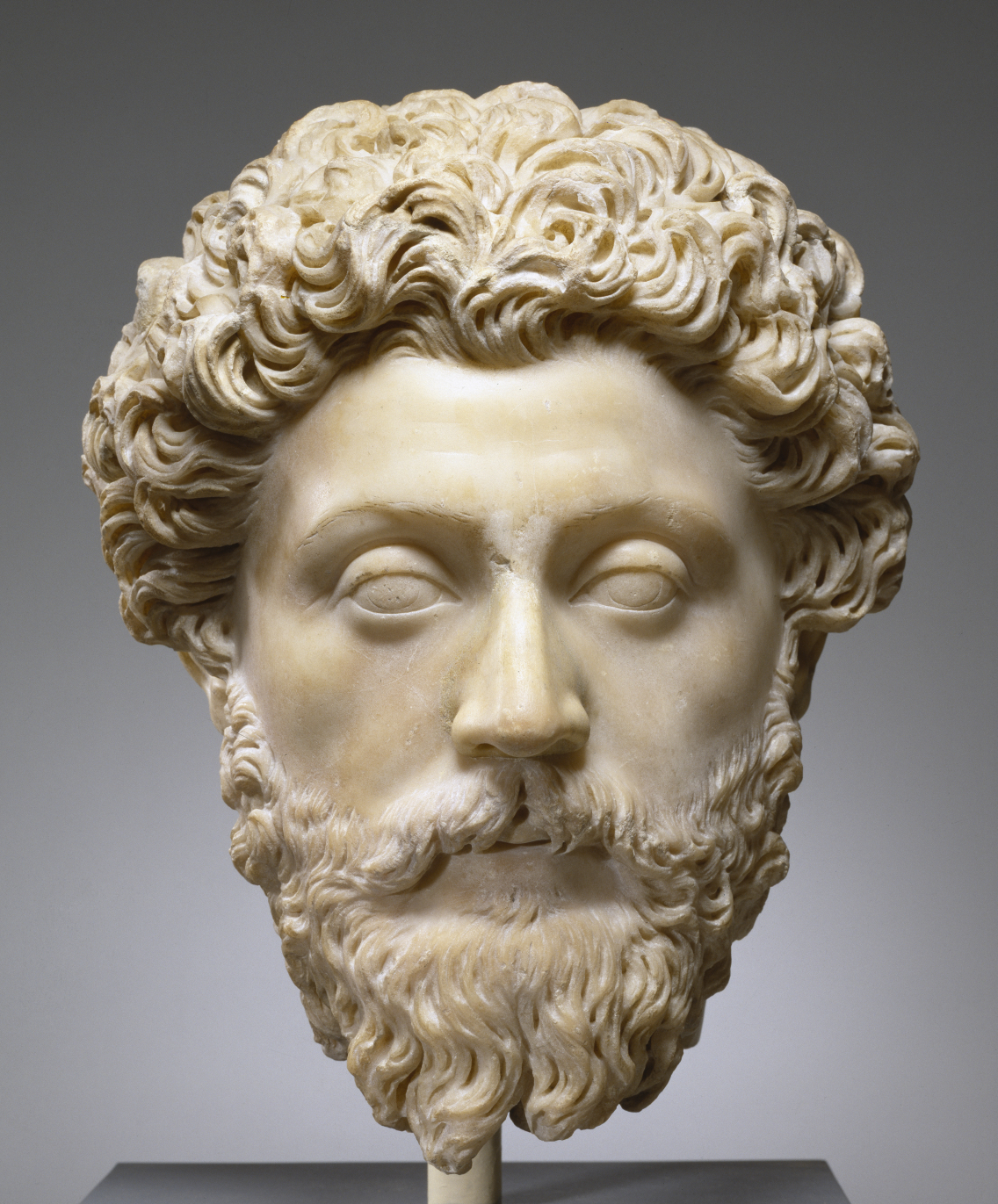
A 2nd century Roman sculpted portrait of Marcus Aurelius, which captures the pensive temperament of the philosopher-emperor, now in the Walters Art Museum

Marcus acquired the reputation of a philosopher king within his lifetime, and the title would remain after his death; both Dio and the biographer call him "the philosopher". Christians such as Justin Martyr, Athenagoras, and Eusebius also gave him the title. The last went so far as to call him "more philanthropic and philosophic" than Antoninus and Hadrian, and set him against the persecuting emperors Domitian and Nero to make the contrast bolder.

The historian Herodian wrote:

Alone of the emperors, he gave proof of his learning not by mere words or knowledge of philosophical doctrines but by his blameless character and temperate way of life.

Iain King says Marcus's legacy was tragic:

[The emperor's] Stoic philosophy – which is about self-restraint, duty, and respect for others – was so abjectly abandoned by the imperial line he anointed on his death.

== Legacy ==
=== Equestrian statue ===
The equestrian statue of Marcus Aurelius in Rome is the only Roman equestrian statue which has survived into the modern period. Crafted of bronze in c. 175, it stands 11.6 ft (3.5 m) and is now located in the Capitoline Museums of Rome. The emperor's hand is outstretched in an act of clemency offered to a bested enemy, while his weary facial expression due to the stress of leading Rome into nearly constant battles perhaps represents a break with the classical tradition of sculpture.

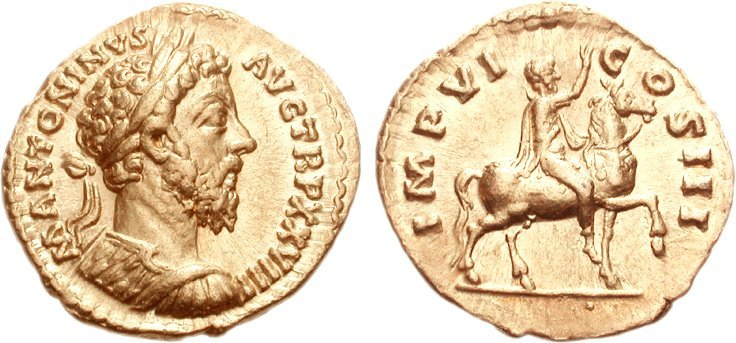
Aureus of Marcus Aurelius (AD December 173 – June 174), with his equestrian statue on the reverse. inscription: M. ANTONINVS AVG. TR. P. XXVIII / IMP. VI, CO[N]S III.

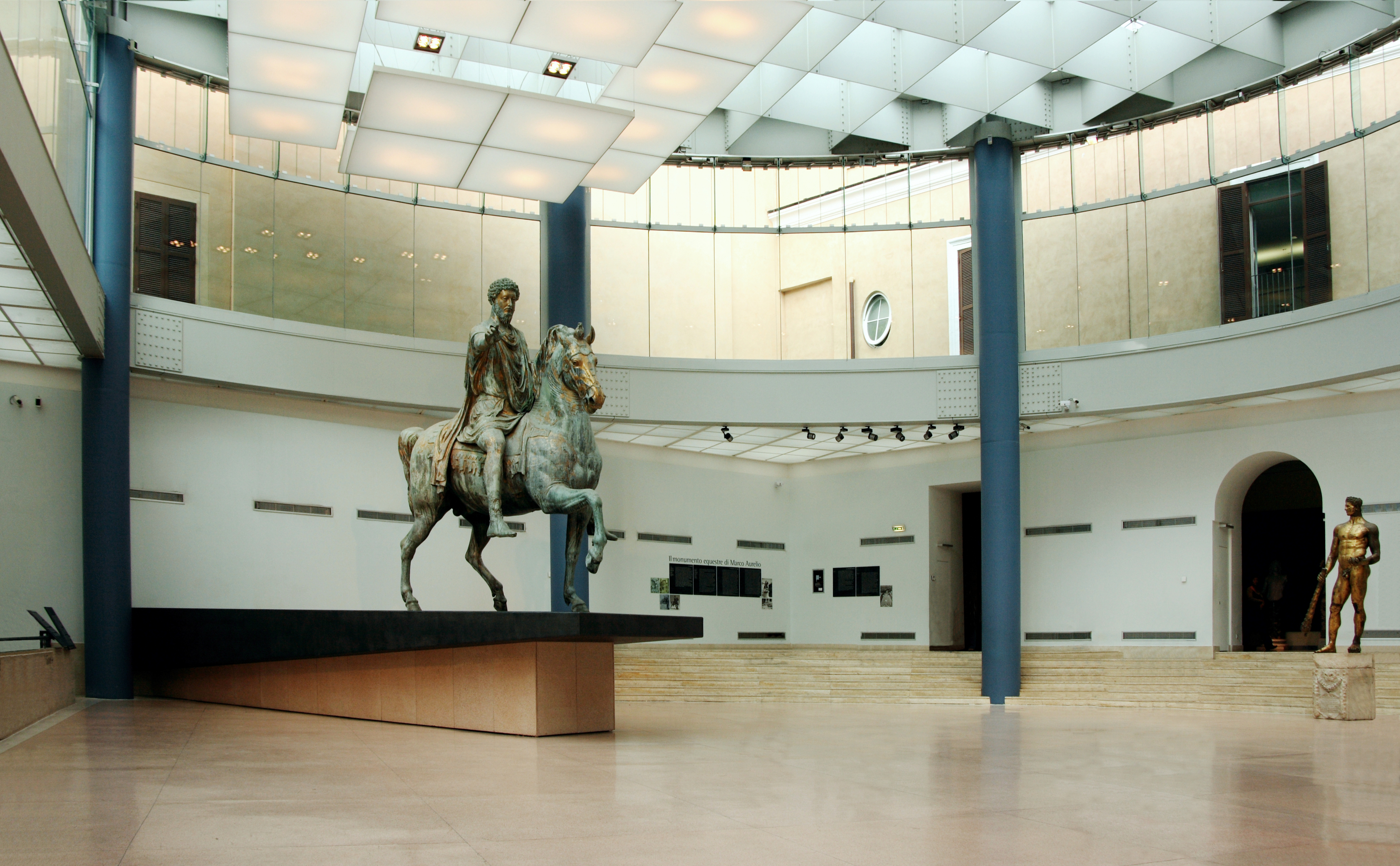
The original Equestrian Statue of Marcus Aurelius, 2nd century AD, now located in the Palazzo dei Conservatori

=== Column ===
Marcus's victory column, established in Rome either in his last few years of life or after his reign and completed in 193, was built to commemorate his victory over the Sarmatians and Germanic tribes in 176. A spiral of carved reliefs wraps around the column, showing scenes from his military campaigns. A statue of Marcus had stood atop the column but disappeared during the Middle Ages. It was replaced with a statue of Saint Paul in 1589 by Pope Sixtus V. The column of Marcus and the column of Trajan are often compared by scholars given how they are both Doric in style, had a pedestal at the base, had sculpted friezes depicting their respective military victories, and a statue on top.

== Personal life ==
=== Marriage and family ===
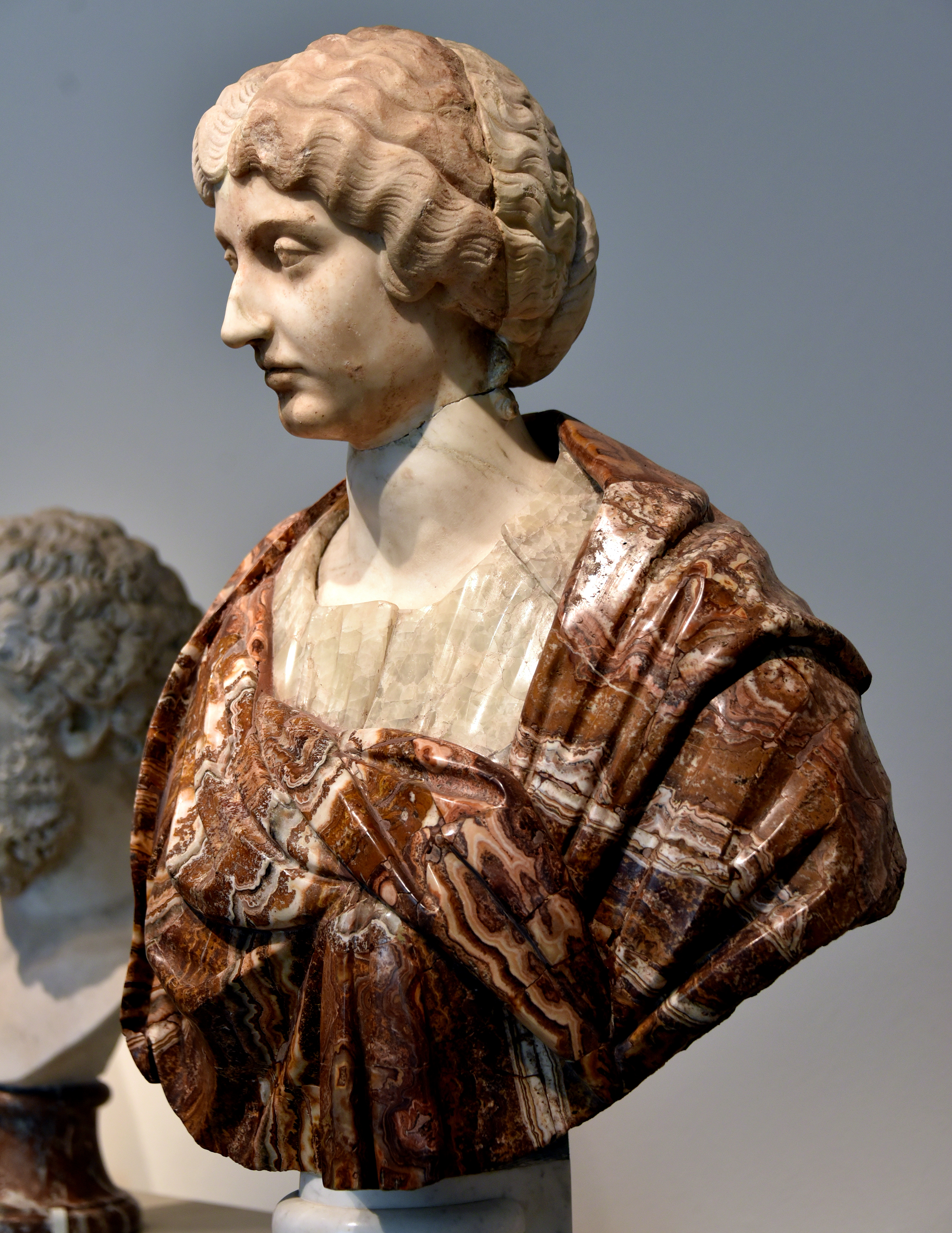
Bust of Faustina the Younger, AD 161-170, Altes Museum, Berlin

Marcus and his wife Faustina had at least 14 children during their 30-year marriage, including two sets of twins. One son and four daughters outlived their father. Their children included:

- Domitia Faustina (147–151)
- Titus Aelius Antoninus (149)
- Titus Aelius Aurelius (149)
- Annia Aurelia Galeria Lucilla (150–182) married her father's co-ruler Lucius Verus, then Tiberius Claudius Pompeianus, had issue from both marriages
- Annia Galeria Aurelia Faustina (born 151), married Gnaeus Claudius Severus, had a son
- Tiberius Aelius Antoninus (born 152, died before 156)
- Unknown child (died before 158)
- Annia Aurelia Fadilla (born 159), married Marcus Peducaeus Plautius Quintillus, had issue
- Annia Cornificia Faustina Minor (born 160), married Marcus Petronius Sura Mamertinus, had a son
- Titus Aurelius Fulvus Antoninus (161–165), elder twin brother of Commodus
- Lucius Aurelius Commodus Antoninus (Commodus) (161–192), twin brother of Titus Aurelius Fulvus Antoninus, later emperor, married Bruttia Crispina, no issue
- Marcus Annius Verus Caesar (162–169)
- Hadrianus
- Vibia Aurelia Sabina (170 – died before 217), married Lucius Antistius Burrus, no issue

== Nerva–Antonine family tree ==
Nerva–Antonine family tree

Q. Marcius Barea Soranus	Q. Marcius Barea Sura	Antonia Furnilla	M. Cocceius Nerva	Sergia Plautilla	P. Aelius Hadrianus
Titus (r. 79–81)	Marcia Furnilla	Marcia	Trajanus Pater	Nerva (r. 96–98)	Ulpia (Note: Sister of Trajan's father: Giacosa (1977), p. 7.)	Aelius Hadrianus Marullinus
Flavia (Note: Giacosa (1977), p. 8.)	Marciana (Note: Levick (2014), p. 161.)	C. Salonius Matidius (Note: Husband of Ulpia Marciana: Levick (2014), p. 161.)	Trajan (r. 98–117)	Plotina	P. Acilius Attianus	P. Aelius Afer (Note: Giacosa (1977), p. 7.)	Paulina Major (Note: DIR contributor (Herbert W. Benario, 2000), "Hadrian".)
Lucius Mindius (2)	Libo Rupilius Frugi (3)	Salonia Matidia (Note: Giacosa (1977), p. 9.)	L. Vibius Sabinus (1) (Note: Husband of Salonia Matidia: Levick (2014), p. 161.)
Paulina Minor	L. Julius Ursus Servianus (Note: Smith (1870), "Julius Servianus".)
Matidia Minor	Sabina	Hadrian (Note: Smith (1870), "Hadrian", pp. 319–322.) (r. 117–138)	Antinous (Note: Lover of Hadrian: Lambert (1984), p. 99 and passim; deification: Lambert (1984), pp. 2–5, etc.)
C. Fuscus Salinator I	Julia Serviana Paulina
M. Annius Verus (Note: Husband of Rupilia Faustina: Levick (2014), p. 163.)	Rupilia Faustina (Note: Levick (2014), p. 163.) (Note: It is uncertain whether Rupilia Faustina was Frugi's daughter by Salonia Matidia or another woman.)	Boionia Procilla	Cn. Arrius Antoninus
L. Ceionius Commodus	Appia Severa	C. Fuscus Salinator II
L. Caesennius Paetus	Arria Antonina	Arria Fadilla (Note: Levick (2014), p. 162.)	T. Aurelius Fulvus
L. Caesennius Antoninus	L. Commodus	Plautia	unknown (Note: Levick (2014), p. 164.)	C. Avidius Nigrinus
M. Annius Verus	Calvisia Domitia Lucilla (Note: Wife of M. Annius Verus: Giacosa (1977), p. 10.)	Fundania (Note: Wife of M. Annius Libo: Levick (2014), p. 163.)	M. Annius Libo	Faustina	Antoninus Pius (r. 138–161)	L. Aelius Caesar	Avidia
Cornificia	Marcus Aurelius (r. 161–180) (Note: Giacosa (1977), p. 10.)	Faustina Minor	Aurelia Fadilla	Lucius Verus (r. 161–169) (1)	Ceionia Fabia	Plautius Quintillus (Note: Husband of Ceionia Fabia: Levick (2014), p. 164.)	Q. Servilius Pudens	Ceionia Plautia
Cornificia Minor (Note: Levick (2014), p. 117.)	M. Petronius Sura	Commodus (r. 177–192)	Fadilla	M. Annius Verus Caesar	Ti. Claudius Pompeianus (2)	Lucilla	M. Plautius Quintillus	Junius Licinius Balbus	Servilia Ceionia
Petronius Antoninus	L. Aurelius Agaclytus (2)	Aurelia Sabina	L. Antistius Burrus (1)	Plautius Quintillus	Plautia Servilla	C. Furius Sabinus Timesitheus	Maecia Faustina	Junius Licinius Balbus?
Furia Sabinia Tranquillina	Gordian III (r. 238–244)

- (1) = 1st spouse
- (2) = 2nd spouse
- (3) = 3rd spouse
- Reddish-purple indicates emperor of the Nerva–Antonine dynasty
  lighter purple indicates designated imperial heir of said dynasty who never reigned
  grey indicates unsuccessful imperial aspirants
  bluish-purple indicates emperors of other dynasties
- dashed lines indicate adoption; dotted lines indicate love affairs/unmarried relationships
- Small Caps = posthumously deified (Augusti, Augustae, or other)

Notes:

Except where otherwise noted, the notes below indicate that an individual's parentage is as shown in the above family tree.

References:
- DIR contributors (2000). "De Imperatoribus Romanis: An Online Encyclopedia of Roman Rulers and Their Families".
- Giacosa, Giorgio (1977). Women of the Caesars: Their Lives and Portraits on Coins. Translated by Holloway, R. Ross. Milan: Edizioni Arte e Moneta. ISBN 0-8390-0193-2.
- Lambert, Royston (1984). Beloved and God: The Story of Hadrian and Antinous. New York: Viking. ISBN 0-670-15708-2.
- Levick, Barbara (2014). Faustina I and II: Imperial Women of the Golden Age. Oxford University Press. ISBN 978-0-19-537941-9.
- Smith, William, ed. (1870). Dictionary of Greek and Roman Biography and Mythology.

== See also ==
- List of Roman emperors

== Citations ==
All citations to the Historia Augusta are to individual biographies, and are marked with a 'HA'. Citations to the works of Fronto are cross-referenced to C.R. Haines's Loeb edition.

== Bibliography ==
=== Ancient ===
- Aristides, Aelius. Orationes (in Latin).

Trapp, Michael B. Orations. 1: Orationes 1–2. Cambridge, Massachusetts: Harvard University Press, 2017. ISBN 978-0674996465.

- Victor, Aurelius. De Caesaribus (in Latin).

Bird, H.W. De Caesaribus. Liverpool: Liverpool University Press, 1994. ISBN 978-0853232186.

- Dio, Cassius. Roman History (in Greek).

Cary, Earnest, trans. Roman History. 9 vols. Loeb ed. London: Heinemann, 1914–27. OCLC 500523615. Online at LacusCurtius Archived 4 April 2021 at the Wayback Machine.

- Digest (in Latin).

Scott, S.P., trans. The Digest or Pandects in The Civil Law. 17 vols. Cincinnati: Central Trust Company, 1932. OCLC 23759480. Online at the Constitution Society Archived 11 November 2001 at the Wayback Machine.

- Epiphanius of Salamis. On Weights and Measures (in Latin).

Dean, James Elmer, ed. Epiphanius' Treatise on Weights and Measures – The Syriac Version. Chicago: University of Chicago Press, 1935. OCLC 123314338.

- Fronto, Marcus Cornelius. The Correspondence of Marcus Cornelius Fronto: With Marcus Aurelius Antoninus, Lucius Verus, Antoninus Pius, and Various Friends (in Latin).

Haines, Charles Reginald, trans. The Correspondence of Marcus Cornelius Fronto: With Marcus Aurelius Antoninus, Lucius Verus, Antoninus Pius, and Various Friends. 2 vols. Loeb ed. London: Heinemann, 1920. OCLC 476921438. Online at the Internet Archive: Vol. 1, 2.

- Gellius, Aulus. Noctes Atticae (Attic Nights).

Rolfe, J.C., trans. The Attic nights of Aulus Gellius. 3 vols. Loeb ed. London: Heinemann, 1927–28. OCLC 59229750 (Vol. 1), OCLC 1072405870 (Vol. 2), OCLC 1021363430 (Vol. 3). Vols. 1 and 2 online at LacusCurtius.

- Herodian. Ab Excessu Divi Marci (History of the Roman Empire from the Death of Marcus Aurelius, in Latin).

Echols, Edward C., trans. Herodian of Antioch's History of the Roman empire: From the death of Marcus Aurelius to the accession of Gordian III. Berkeley and Los Angeles: University of California Press, 1961. OCLC 463202486. Online at Tertullian Archived 20 June 2010 at the Wayback Machine and Livius Archived 29 December 2019 at the Wayback Machine.

- Lucian.

Fowler, F.G.; Fowler, H.W., trans. The works of Lucian of Samosata. Oxford: Clarendon P., 1949. OCLC 503242210.
Alexander (in Latin). Translation online at Tertullian Archived 9 November 2017 at the Wayback Machine.
Translations (from Latin) of Historia Quomodo Conscribenda (The Way to Write History) Archived 15 April 2009 at the Wayback Machine, Imagines (A Portrait–Study) Archived 10 August 2007 at the Wayback Machine, and Pro Imaginibus (Defence of the 'Portrait–Study') Archived 27 March 2009 at the Wayback Machine online at Sacred Texts, based on the Gutenberg Archived 10 November 2020 at the Wayback Machine e-text.

- Marcus Aurelius Antoninus. Meditations.

Farquharson, A.S.L., trans. Meditations. New York: Knopf, 1946, rept. 1992. OCLC 897495952.

- Scriptores Historiae Augustae (Authors of the Historia Augusta). Historia Augusta (Augustan History).

Magie, David, trans. Historia Augusta. 3 vols. Loeb ed. London: Heinemann, 1921–32. Online at LacusCurtius Archived 25 July 2021 at the Wayback Machine.
Magie, David; Birley, Anthony R. Lives of the later Caesars. London: The Folio Society, 2005. ISBN 0141935995.

- Themistius. Orationes (in Latin).

Penella, Robert J. The private orations of Themistius. Berkeley: University of California Press, 2000. ISBN 978-0520218215.

=== Modern ===
- Ackermann, Marsha E.; Schroeder, Michael J.; Terry, Jancie J.; Lo Upshur, Jiu-Hwa; Whitters, Mark F. Encyclopedia of World History, Ackerman-Schroeder-Terry-Hwa Lo, 2008: Encyclopedia of World History. New York: Facts on File, 2008. ISBN 978-0816063864.
- Adams, Geoff W. Marcus Aurelius in the Historia Augusta and Beyond. Lanham, MD: Lexington Books, 2013. ISBN 978-0739176382.
- An, Jiayao. 'When Glass Was Treasured in China'. Annette L. Juliano and Judith A. Lerner (eds), Nomads, Traders, and Holy Men Along China's Silk Road, 79–94. Turnhout, Belgium: Brepols Publishers, 2002. ISBN 978-2503521787.
- Astarita, Maria L. Avidio Cassio (in Italian). Rome: Edizione di Storia e Letteratura, 1983. OCLC 461867183.
- Ball, Warwick. Rome in the East: The Transformation of an Empire, 2nd edition. London: Routledge, 2016. ISBN 978-0415720786.
- Barnes, Timothy D. 'Hadrian and Lucius Verus'. Journal of Roman Studies 57:1–2 (1967): 65–79. doi:10.2307/299345. JSTOR 299345.
- Barnes, Timothy D. 'Legislation against the Christians'. Journal of Roman Studies, Vol. 58 (1968): 32–50. doi:10.2307/299693. JSTOR 299693.
- Barnes, Timothy D. 'Some Persons in the Historia Augusta', Phoenix 26:2 (1972): 140–182. doi:10.2307/1087714. JSTOR 1087714.
- Birley, Anthony R. Marcus Aurelius: a biography. London: Routledge, 1966, rev. 1987. ISBN 978-1134695690.
- Birley, Anthony R. 'Hadrian to the Antonines'. In The Cambridge Ancient History Volume 11, The High Empire, AD 70–192, edited by Alan Bowman, Peter Garnsey, and Dominic Rathbone, 132–194. Cambridge: Cambridge University Press, 2000. ISBN 978-0521263351.
- Bowman, John L. A Reference Guide to Stoicism. Bloomington, IN: Author House, 2014. ISBN 978-1496900173.
- Bury, John Bagnell. The Student's Roman Empire: A History of the Roman Empire from Its Foundation to the Death of Marcus Aurelius (27 B.C.–180 A.D.). New York: Harper, 1893. OCLC 1067064647.
- Champlin, Edward. 'The Chronology of Fronto'. Journal of Roman Studies 64 (1974): 136–159. doi:10.2307/299265. JSTOR 299265.
- Champlin, Edward. Fronto and Antonine Rome. Cambridge, MA: Harvard University Press, 1980. ISBN 978-0674331778.
- Collins, Desmond. Background to Archaeology: Britain in its European Setting. Cambridge: Cambridge University Press Archive, 1973. OCLC 879899744.
- De Crespigny, Rafe. A Biographical Dictionary of Later Han to the Three Kingdoms (23–220 AD). Boston: Brill, 2007. ISBN 978-9047411840.
- Duncan-Jones, Richard. Structure and Scale in the Roman Economy. Cambridge: Cambridge University Press, 1990. ISBN 978-0521892896.
- 'Equestrian Statue of Marcus Aurelius' Archived 5 September 2018 at the Wayback Machine. Musei Capitolini.
- Gagarin, Michael. The Oxford encyclopaedia of ancient Greece and Rome. Volume 7, Temples – Zoology. Oxford: Oxford University Press, 2010. ISBN 978-0195170726.
- Giacosa, Giorgio. Women of the Caesars: their lives and portraits on coins. Translated from Italian by R. Ross Holloway. Milan: Edizioni Arte e Moneta, 1977. ISBN 0839001932.
- Gilliam, J. F. 'The Plague under Marcus Aurelius'. American Journal of Philology 82.3 (1961): 225–251. doi:10.2307/292367. JSTOR 292367.
- Gnecchi, Francesco. I medaglioni Romani, 3 Vols, Milan, 1912. OCLC 6529816.
- Grant, Michael. The Antonines: the Roman Empire in transition. London: Routledge, 2016. ISBN 978-1317972105.
- Grant, Michael. The Climax Of Rome. London: Orion, 2011. ISBN 978-1780222769.
- Haas, Charles. The Antonine plague Archived 28 April 2020 at the Wayback Machine (in French). Bulletin de l'Académie Nationale de Médecine. Académie nationale de médecine. 190 (2006): 1093–1098. OCLC 958470753.
- Hadot, Pierre. The inner citadel: the Meditations of Marcus Aurelius. Cambridge, MA: Harvard University Press, 1998. ISBN 978-0674461710.
- Hays, Gregory. Meditations. London: Weidenfeld & Nicolson, 2003. ISBN 978-1842126752.
- Holiday, Ryan; Hanselman, Stephen (2020). "Marcus Aurelius the Philosopher King". Lives of the Stoics. New York: Portfolio/Penguin. pp. 279–299. ISBN 978-0525541875.
- Irvine, William B. A Guide to the Good Life: The Ancient Art of Stoic Joy. Oxford University Press, 2009. ISBN 978-1522632733.
- Kemezis, Adam M. Greek Narratives of the Roman Empire under the Severans: Cassius Dio, Philostratus and Herodian. Cambridge University Press, 2014. ISBN 978-1107062726.
- Kleiner, Fred S. Gardner's art through the ages. Volume II: the western perspective. Mason, OH: Cengage Learning, 2008. ISBN 978-0495573555.
- Le Bohec, Yann. The Imperial Roman Army. Routledge, 2013. ISBN 978-1135955137.
- Levick, Barbara M. Faustina I and II: Imperial Women of the Golden Age. New York: Oxford University Press, 2014. ISBN 978-0199702176.
- Magill, Frank N. Dictionary of World Biography. London: Routledge, 2003. ISBN 978-1579580407.
- Mattingly, Harold; Sydenham, Edward A. The Roman imperial coinage. Vol. III, Antoninus Pius to Commodus. London: Spink & Son, 1930. OCLC 768929523.
- Mellor, Ronald, review of Edward Champlin's Fronto and Antonine Rome, American Journal of Philology 103:4 (1982).
- Merrony, Mark. The Plight of Rome in the Fifth Century AD Archived 19 January 2023 at the Wayback Machine. London: Routledge, 2017. ISBN 978-1351702782.
- McLaughlin, Raoul. Rome and the Distant East: Trade Routes to the Ancient Lands of Arabia, India, and China. London & New York: Continuum, 2010. ISBN 978-1847252357.
- McLynn, Frank. Marcus Aurelius: A Life. New York: Da Capo Press, 2009. ISBN 978-0306819162.
- McLynn, Frank. Marcus Aurelius: Warrior, Philosopher, Emperor. London: Bodley Head, 2009. ISBN 978-0224072922.
- Millar, Fergus. The Roman Near East, 31 B.C.–A.D. 337 Archived 19 March 2023 at the Wayback Machine. Cambridge, MA: Harvard University Press, 1993. ISBN 978-0674778863.
- Pulleyblank, Edwin G.; Leslie, D. D.; Gardiner, K. H. J. 'The Roman Empire as Known to Han China'. Journal of the American Oriental Society, 1999. 119 (1). doi:10.2307/605541. JSTOR 605541.
- Reed, J. Eugene. The Lives of the Roman Emperors and Their Associates from Julius Cæsar (B.C. 100) to Agustulus (A.D. 476). Philadelphia, PA: Gebbie & Company, 1883.
- Robertson, D. How to Think Like a Roman Emperor: The Stoic Philosophy of Marcus Aurelius Archived 4 August 2019 at the Wayback Machine. New York: St. Martin's Press, 2019.
- Rohrbacher, David. The Play of Allusion in the Historia Augusta. Wisconsin: University of Wisconsin Press, 2016. ISBN 978-0299306045.
- Sánchez, Jorge Pisa. Breve historia de Hispania: La fascinante historia de Hispania, desde Viriato hasta el esplendor con los emperadores Trajano y Adriano. Los protagonistas, la cultura, la religión y el desarrollo económico y social de una de las provincias más ricas del Imperio romano [Brief history of Hispania: the fascinating history of Hispania, from Viriato to the splendor with the Emperors Trajan and Hadrian. The protagonists, culture, religion, and the economic and social development of one of the richest provinces of the Roman Empire] (in Spanish). Ediciones Nowtilus S.L., 2010. ISBN 978-8497637695.
- Stephens, William O. Marcus Aurelius: A Guide for the Perplexed Archived 1 June 2014 at the Wayback Machine. London: Continuum, 2012. ISBN 978-1441125613.
- Stertz, Stephen A. 'Marcus Aurelius as Ideal Emperor in Late-Antique Greek Thought'. The Classical World 70:7 (1977): 433–439. doi:10.2307/4348712. JSTOR 4348712.
- Syme, Ronald. 'The Ummidii'. Historia 17:1 (1968): 72–105. JSTOR 4435015.
- Van Ackeren, Marcel. A Companion to Marcus Aurelius Archived 9 September 2023 at the Wayback Machine. New York: Malden, MA : Wiley-Blackwell, 2012. ISBN 978-1405192859. OCLC 784124210.
- Young, Gary K. Rome's Eastern Trade: International Commerce and Imperial Policy 31 BC – AD 305. London: Routledge, 2003. ISBN 978-1134547937.
- Yü, Ying-shih. 'Han Foreign Relations', in Denis Twitchett and Michael Loewe (eds), The Cambridge History of China: Volume 1, The Ch'in and Han Empires, 221 BC–AD 220, 377–462. Cambridge: Cambridge University Press, 1986. ISBN 978-0521243278.

Marcus Aurelius Antonine dynasty Born: 26 April 121 Died: 17 March 180
Regnal titles
Preceded by Antoninus Pius	Roman emperor 161–180; With: Lucius Verus (161–169); Commodus (177–180)	Succeeded by Commodus
Political offices
Preceded by M. Ceccius Justinus; G. Julius Bassus as suffect consuls	Roman consul January–April 140; With: Antoninus Pius	Succeeded by Q. Antonius Isauricus; L. Aurelius Flaccus
Preceded by L. Marcius Celer M. Calpurnius Longus; D. Velius Fidus as suffect consuls	Roman consul January–February 145; With: Antoninus Pius	Succeeded by L. Plautius Lamia Silvanus; L. Poblicola Priscus
Preceded by Ti. Oclatius Severus; Novius Sabinianus	Roman consul January 161; With: Lucius Verus	Succeeded by M. Annius Libo; Q. Camurius Numisius Junior
