= Titus Aurelius Fulvus =

Titus Aurelius Fulvus may refer to:

- Titus Aurelius Fulvus (grandfather of Antoninus Pius)
- Titus Aurelius Fulvus (father of Antoninus Pius)
- Titus Aurelius Fulvus Boionius Arrius Antoninus, emperor as Antoninus Pius
