= Matidia Minor =

2nd century Roman noblewoman

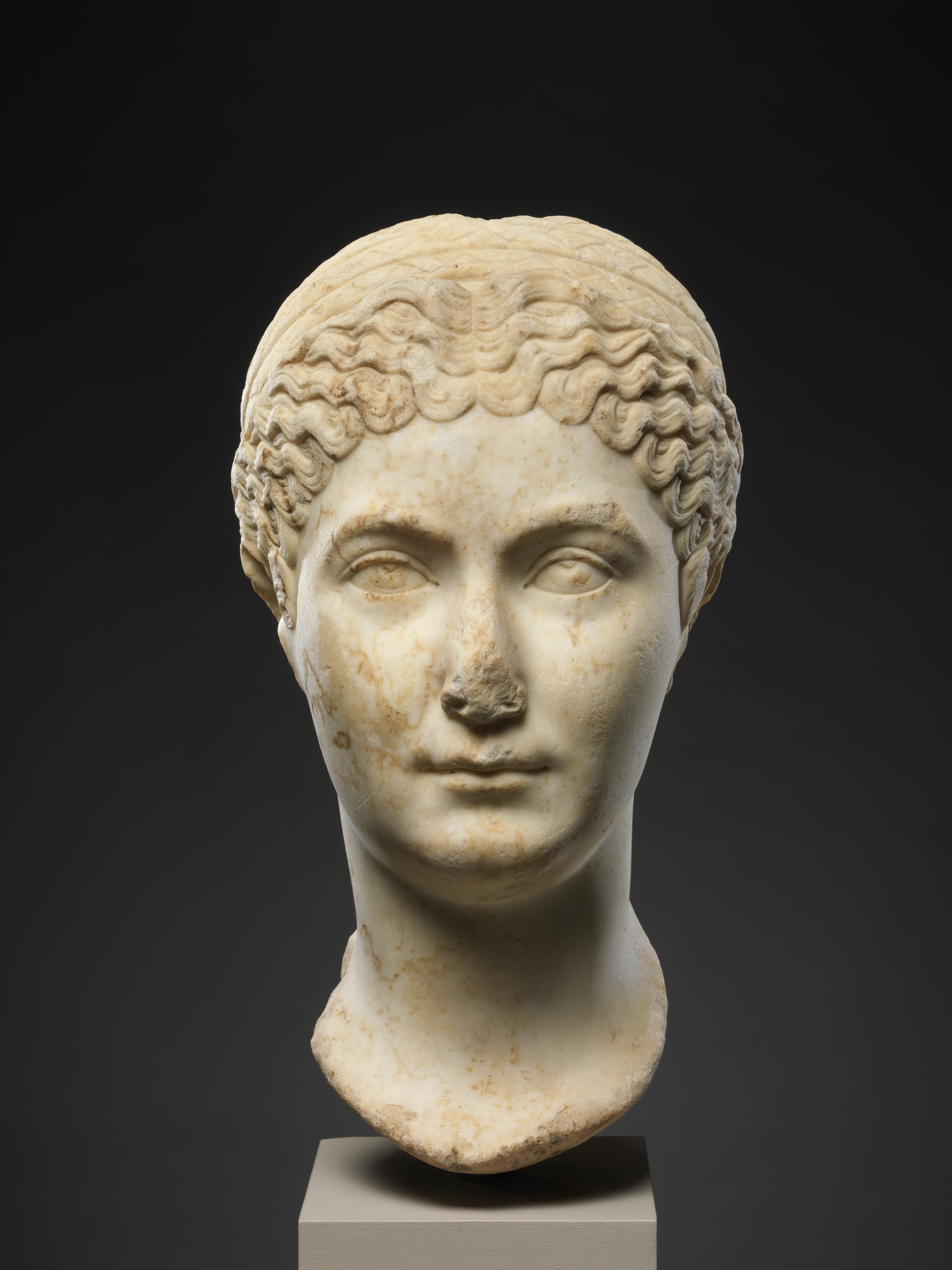
- Born: 85
- Died: after 161
- House: Nerva–Antonine dynasty
- Father: Lucius Mindius
- Mother: Salonia Matidia

Mindia Matidia, also known as Matidia Minor (Minor being Latin for the younger, 85 – after 161) was a Roman imperial noblewoman in the early second century AD. She was related to several ancient Roman Emperors, as a great-niece to Trajan and half-sister to Vibia Sabina, who was the wife of Hadrian. The modern village of Matigge, Italy, is perhaps named after her.

== Family ==
Matidia Minor was the daughter of Salonia Matidia from her second marriage to the otherwise unattested Roman aristocrat Lucius Mindius. Her mother Salonia Matidia was the daughter of Ulpia Marciana, sister of Roman emperor Trajan, and therefore was a niece of the emperor. Matidia Minor's half-sister Vibia Sabina was to become empress and wife of the Roman emperor Hadrian. Hadrian was also her third cousin.

== Life ==
After her father's death in 85, Matidia along with her half-sisters lived with their grandmother and mother and were raised in the household of Trajan, his wife Plotina and her stepfather. Matidia Minor never received the title of Augusta and there is little evidence of her involvement in state affairs. Her husband or children, if they ever existed, did not register in historical records, and she remained single for the rest of her life (which was unusual at the time).

Trajan gave her a villa where modern Matigge, Italy is now located. Due to this villa, the city became known in Latin as Insula Matidiae (modern Matigge, Italy). Matidia became competent in her affairs and when her sister became empress, she would often travel with her and her brother-in-law.

=== Patron ===
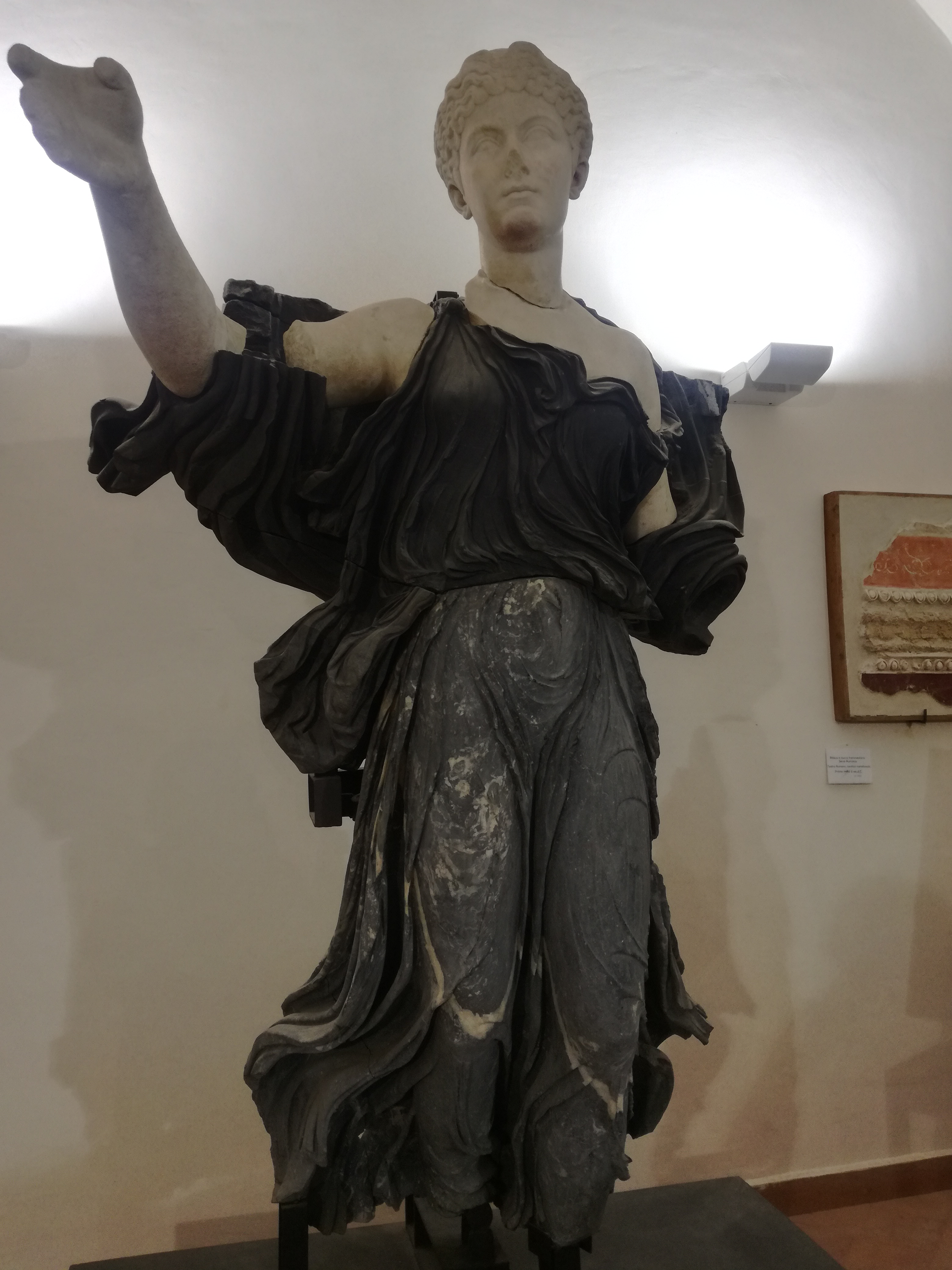
Statue of Matidia found during the excavations of the theatre in Sessa Aurunca

During the time she was single, she was in full control of her wealth, part of which she distributed as a benefaction. Her involvement in euergetism yielded inscriptions thanking her across different parts of the empire, mostly during the reign of Antoninus Pius.

Excavations in the area of Sessa Aurunca showed that Matidia was a major benefactress in the city, attesting her wealth, culture and influence. Matidia underwrote the restoration of the theatre of Sessa Aurunca which was probably damaged by an earthquake during the rule of emperor Antoninus Pius (138-161). Her generosity was commemorated with a statue and inscriptions in the theatre.

=== Later life and death ===
Matidia lived to an advanced age and outlived most of her relatives. In her later years, she was very close to her great-nephew, the future emperor Marcus Aurelius, and his family. Marcus Aurelius would sometimes allow his daughters to stay with his great-aunt.

Matidia, like many other childless women, "attracted a number of hangers-on who hoped to be remembered in her will". On her deathbed, they sealed her codicils (additions to her will) assuring their validity and ensuring that they would inherit some of her substantial estate. From her will, various family members and associates received a million sesterces (an ancient Roman unit of currency), her estate, and various other items she had. The administrator of the estate was the empress Faustina the Younger.

== Nerva–Antonine family tree ==
Nerva–Antonine family tree

Q. Marcius Barea Soranus	Q. Marcius Barea Sura	Antonia Furnilla	M. Cocceius Nerva	Sergia Plautilla	P. Aelius Hadrianus
Titus (r. 79–81)	Marcia Furnilla	Marcia	Trajanus Pater	Nerva (r. 96–98)	Ulpia (Note: Sister of Trajan's father: Giacosa (1977), p. 7.)	Aelius Hadrianus Marullinus
Flavia (Note: Giacosa (1977), p. 8.)	Marciana (Note: Levick (2014), p. 161.)	C. Salonius Matidius (Note: Husband of Ulpia Marciana: Levick (2014), p. 161.)	Trajan (r. 98–117)	Plotina	P. Acilius Attianus	P. Aelius Afer (Note: Giacosa (1977), p. 7.)	Paulina Major (Note: DIR contributor (Herbert W. Benario, 2000), "Hadrian".)
Lucius Mindius (2)	Libo Rupilius Frugi (3)	Salonia Matidia (Note: Giacosa (1977), p. 9.)	L. Vibius Sabinus (1) (Note: Husband of Salonia Matidia: Levick (2014), p. 161.)
Paulina Minor	L. Julius Ursus Servianus (Note: Smith (1870), "Julius Servianus".)
Matidia Minor	Sabina	Hadrian (Note: Smith (1870), "Hadrian", pp. 319–322.) (r. 117–138)	Antinous (Note: Lover of Hadrian: Lambert (1984), p. 99 and passim; deification: Lamber (1984), pp. 2–5, etc.)
C. Fuscus Salinator I	Julia Serviana Paulina
M. Annius Verus (Note: Husband of Rupilia Faustina: Levick (2014), p. 163.)	Rupilia Faustina (Note: Levick (2014), p. 163.) (Note: It is uncertain whether Rupilia Faustina was Frugi's daughter by Salonia Matidia or another woman.)	Boionia Procilla	Cn. Arrius Antoninus
L. Ceionius Commodus	Appia Severa	C. Fuscus Salinator II
L. Caesennius Paetus	Arria Antonina	Arria Fadilla (Note: Levick (2014), p. 162.)	T. Aurelius Fulvus
L. Caesennius Antoninus	L. Commodus	Plautia	unknown (Note: Levick (2014), p. 164.)	C. Avidius Nigrinus
M. Annius Verus	Calvisia Domitia Lucilla (Note: Wife of M. Annius Verus: Giacosa (1977), p. 10.)	Fundania (Note: Wife of M. Annius Libo: Levick (2014), p. 163.)	M. Annius Libo	Faustina	Antoninus Pius (r. 138–161)	L. Aelius Caesar	Avidia
Cornificia	Marcus Aurelius (r. 161–180) (Note: Giacosa (1977), p. 10.)	Faustina Minor	C. Avidius Cassius (Note: The epitomator of Cassius Dio (72.22) gives the story that Faustina the Elder promised to marry Avidius Cassius. This is also echoed in HA "Marcus Aurelius" 24.)	Aurelia Fadilla	Lucius Verus (r. 161–169) (1)	Ceionia Fabia	Plautius Quintillus (Note: Husband of Ceionia Fabia: Levick (2014), p. 164.)	Q. Servilius Pudens	Ceionia Plautia
Cornificia Minor (Note: Levick (2014), p. 117.)	M. Petronius Sura	Commodus (r. 177–192)	Fadilla	M. Annius Verus Caesar	Ti. Claudius Pompeianus (2)	Lucilla	M. Plautius Quintillus	Junius Licinius Balbus	Servilia Ceionia
Petronius Antoninus	L. Aurelius Agaclytus (2)	Aurelia Sabina	L. Antistius Burrus (1)	Plautius Quintillus	Plautia Servilla	C. Furius Sabinus Timesitheus	Maecia Faustina	Junius Licinius Balbus?
Furia Sabinia Tranquillina	Gordian III (r. 238–244)

- (1) = 1st spouse
- (2) = 2nd spouse
- (3) = 3rd spouse
- Reddish-purple indicates emperor of the Nerva–Antonine dynasty
  lighter purple indicates designated imperial heir of said dynasty who never reigned
  grey indicates unsuccessful imperial aspirants
  bluish-purple indicates emperors of other dynasties
- dashed lines indicate adoption; dotted lines indicate love affairs/unmarried relationships
- Small Caps = posthumously deified (Augusti, Augustae, or other)

Notes:

Except where otherwise noted, the notes below indicate that an individual's parentage is as shown in the above family tree.

References:
- DIR contributors (2000). "De Imperatoribus Romanis: An Online Encyclopedia of Roman Rulers and Their Families".
- Giacosa, Giorgio (1977). Women of the Caesars: Their Lives and Portraits on Coins. Translated by Holloway, R. Ross. Milan: Edizioni Arte e Moneta. ISBN 0-8390-0193-2.
- Lambert, Royston (1984). Beloved and God: The Story of Hadrian and Antinous. New York: Viking. ISBN 0-670-15708-2.
- Levick, Barbara (2014). Faustina I and II: Imperial Women of the Golden Age. Oxford University Press. ISBN 978-0-19-537941-9.
- Smith, William, ed. (1870). Dictionary of Greek and Roman Biography and Mythology.
