= Vibia Aurelia Sabina =

Youngest daughter of Roman Emperor Marcus Aurelius

- Born: 170 AD; Sirmium, Pannonia
- Died: before 217 AD
- Spouse: Antistius Burrus, Lucius Aurelius Agaclytus
- Dynasty: Nerva–Antonine
- Father: Marcus Aurelius
- Mother: Faustina the Younger

Vibia Aurelia Sabina (170 AD – before 217 AD) was the youngest daughter and child born to Roman Emperor Marcus Aurelius and Roman Empress Faustina the Younger. She was a sister to Roman Empress Lucilla and Roman Emperor Commodus. Her maternal grandparents were Roman Emperor Antoninus Pius and Roman Empress Faustina the Elder and her paternal grandparents were Domitia Lucilla and praetor Marcus Annius Verus.

== Life ==
Aurelia Sabina could have been born in Sirmium, Pannonia. In the year of her birth, her parents were preparing war expeditions at Sirmium. Aurelia Sabina was named in honor of the late Roman Empress Vibia Sabina and her late father, the distinguished suffect consul Lucius Vibius Sabinus. Vibia Sabina was a relative of Aurelia Sabina's parents, since she was the step-sister of Rupilia Faustina, who was the paternal grandmother of Marcus Aurelius and the maternal grandmother of Faustina the Younger.

Throughout her childhood, Aurelia Sabina had travelled extensively with her parents throughout the Roman Empire. Sometime before her father died in 180 AD, Aurelia Sabina was betrothed to the African Roman Senator Lucius Antistius Burrus who came from Thibilis, a town near Hippo Regius in the Africa Province.

When her parents died, her older brother Commodus succeeded her father as Roman Emperor in 180 AD. After Aurelia Sabina married Antistius Burrus in Rome, they returned and settled in Thibilis. In 181 AD, her husband served as an ordinary consul there. In 188 AD, Antistius Burrus was involved in a conspiracy against Commodus, along with various other Roman Senators. When this conspiracy was uncovered, Antistius Burrus was put to death, but Aurelia Sabina was not involved in the conspiracy and survived her brother's persecutions.

=== Prominent Italian resident in Roman Africa ===
After her first husband had died, Aurelia Sabina married Lucius Aurelius Agaclytus, a Romano-Greek Freedman who was of Equestrian rank. Aurelia Sabina spent her remaining years in Thibilis. It appears from her marriages that she had no children.

Due to her status; the status of her family and her connections, Aurelia Sabina became a prominent Italian resident in North Africa. According to surviving inscriptions found in Thibilis, Aurelia Sabina became an important "patrona" in Thibilis and the citizens of Thibilis made Aurelia Sabina an honorary citizen. The nearby Romano-Berber city of Calama was promoted to Roman colonia, while sponsored by Vibia Aurelia Sabina and the city honoured her as their "patrona".

== Nerva–Antonine family tree ==
Nerva–Antonine family tree

Q. Marcius Barea Soranus	Q. Marcius Barea Sura	Antonia Furnilla	M. Cocceius Nerva	Sergia Plautilla	P. Aelius Hadrianus
Titus (r. 79–81)	Marcia Furnilla	Marcia	Trajanus Pater	Nerva (r. 96–98)	Ulpia (Note: Sister of Trajan's father: Giacosa (1977), p. 7.)	Aelius Hadrianus Marullinus
Flavia (Note: Giacosa (1977), p. 8.)	Marciana (Note: Levick (2014), p. 161.)	C. Salonius Matidius (Note: Husband of Ulpia Marciana: Levick (2014), p. 161.)	Trajan (r. 98–117)	Plotina	P. Acilius Attianus	P. Aelius Afer (Note: Giacosa (1977), p. 7.)	Paulina Major (Note: DIR contributor (Herbert W. Benario, 2000), "Hadrian".)
Lucius Mindius (2)	Libo Rupilius Frugi (3)	Salonia Matidia (Note: Giacosa (1977), p. 9.)	L. Vibius Sabinus (1) (Note: Husband of Salonia Matidia: Levick (2014), p. 161.)
Paulina Minor	L. Julius Ursus Servianus (Note: Smith (1870), "Julius Servianus".)
Matidia Minor	Sabina	Hadrian (Note: Smith (1870), "Hadrian", pp. 319–322.) (r. 117–138)	Antinous (Note: Lover of Hadrian: Lambert (1984), p. 99 and passim; deification: Lambert (1984), pp. 2–5, etc.)
C. Fuscus Salinator I	Julia Serviana Paulina
M. Annius Verus (Note: Husband of Rupilia Faustina: Levick (2014), p. 163.)	Rupilia Faustina (Note: Levick (2014), p. 163.) (Note: It is uncertain whether Rupilia Faustina was Frugi's daughter by Salonia Matidia or another woman.)	Boionia Procilla	Cn. Arrius Antoninus
L. Ceionius Commodus	Appia Severa	C. Fuscus Salinator II
L. Caesennius Paetus	Arria Antonina	Arria Fadilla (Note: Levick (2014), p. 162.)	T. Aurelius Fulvus
L. Caesennius Antoninus	L. Commodus	Plautia	unknown (Note: Levick (2014), p. 164.)	C. Avidius Nigrinus
M. Annius Verus	Calvisia Domitia Lucilla (Note: Wife of M. Annius Verus: Giacosa (1977), p. 10.)	Fundania (Note: Wife of M. Annius Libo: Levick (2014), p. 163.)	M. Annius Libo	Faustina	Antoninus Pius (r. 138–161)	L. Aelius Caesar	Avidia
Cornificia	Marcus Aurelius (r. 161–180) (Note: Giacosa (1977), p. 10.)	Faustina Minor	Aurelia Fadilla	Lucius Verus (r. 161–169) (1)	Ceionia Fabia	Plautius Quintillus (Note: Husband of Ceionia Fabia: Levick (2014), p. 164.)	Q. Servilius Pudens	Ceionia Plautia
Cornificia Minor (Note: Levick (2014), p. 117.)	M. Petronius Sura	Commodus (r. 177–192)	Fadilla	M. Annius Verus Caesar	Ti. Claudius Pompeianus (2)	Lucilla	M. Plautius Quintillus	Junius Licinius Balbus	Servilia Ceionia
Petronius Antoninus	L. Aurelius Agaclytus (2)	Aurelia Sabina	L. Antistius Burrus (1)	Plautius Quintillus	Plautia Servilla	C. Furius Sabinus Timesitheus	Maecia Faustina	Junius Licinius Balbus?
Furia Sabinia Tranquillina	Gordian III (r. 238–244)

- (1) = 1st spouse
- (2) = 2nd spouse
- (3) = 3rd spouse
- Reddish-purple indicates emperor of the Nerva–Antonine dynasty
  lighter purple indicates designated imperial heir of said dynasty who never reigned
  grey indicates unsuccessful imperial aspirants
  bluish-purple indicates emperors of other dynasties
- dashed lines indicate adoption; dotted lines indicate love affairs/unmarried relationships
- Small Caps = posthumously deified (Augusti, Augustae, or other)

Notes:

Except where otherwise noted, the notes below indicate that an individual's parentage is as shown in the above family tree.

References:
- DIR contributors (2000). "De Imperatoribus Romanis: An Online Encyclopedia of Roman Rulers and Their Families".
- Giacosa, Giorgio (1977). Women of the Caesars: Their Lives and Portraits on Coins. Translated by Holloway, R. Ross. Milan: Edizioni Arte e Moneta. ISBN 0-8390-0193-2.
- Lambert, Royston (1984). Beloved and God: The Story of Hadrian and Antinous. New York: Viking. ISBN 0-670-15708-2.
- Levick, Barbara (2014). Faustina I and II: Imperial Women of the Golden Age. Oxford University Press. ISBN 978-0-19-537941-9.
- Smith, William, ed. (1870). Dictionary of Greek and Roman Biography and Mythology.

== Sources ==
- From Tiberius to the Antonines: a history of the Roman Empire AD 14-192, by Albino Garzetti, 1974
- The Roman Government of Britain, by Anthony R. Birley, Oxford University Press, 2005
- Marcus Aurelius, by Anthony Richard Birley, Routledge, 2000
