= Annia Cornificia Faustina Minor =

Roman emperor Marcus Aurelius' daughter (160-212)

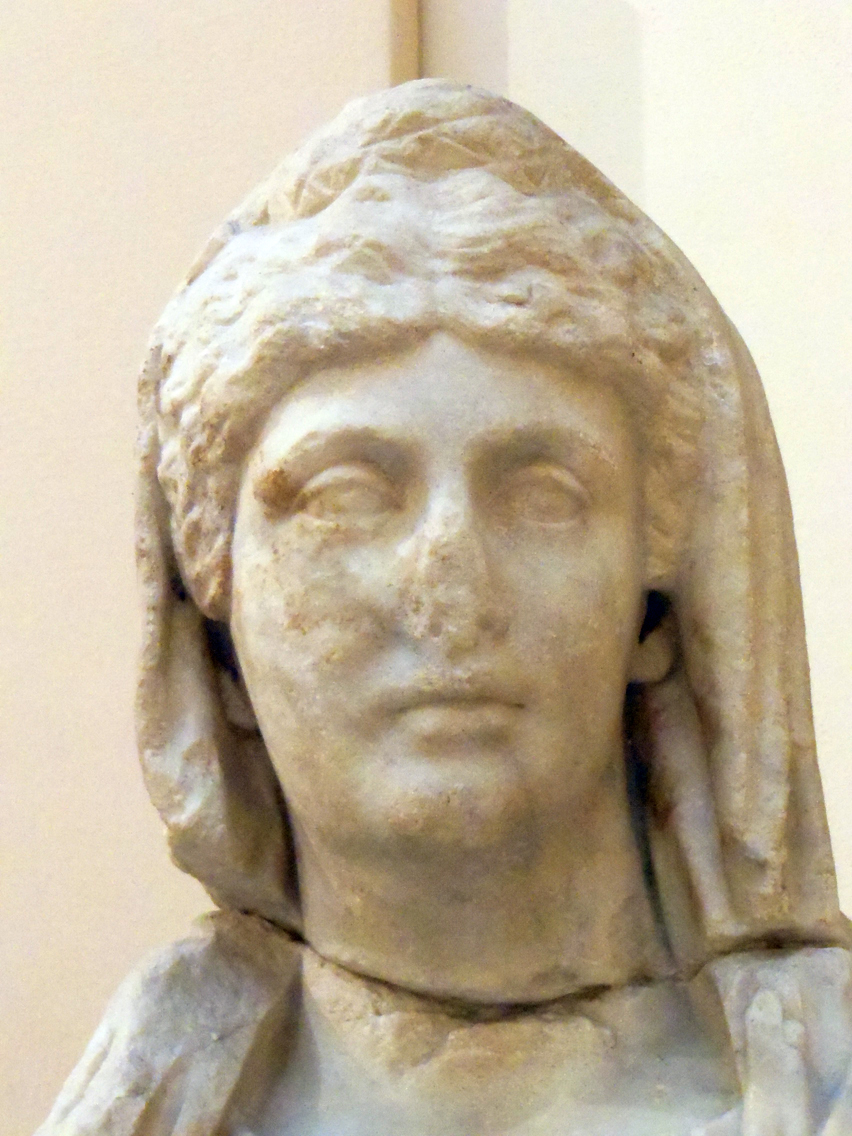
- Statue of Annia Cornificia Faustina Minor (Archaeological Museum in Ostia antica)
- Born: 160 AD; Rome, Italy
- Died: 212 AD
- Spouse: Marcus Petronius Sura Mamertinus
- Dynasty: Nerva–Antonine
- Father: Marcus Aurelius
- Mother: Faustina the Younger

Annia Cornificia Faustina Minor (Minor Latin for the younger, 160–212 AD) was a daughter of the Roman emperor Marcus Aurelius and his wife, Faustina the Younger. She was sister to Lucilla and Commodus. Her maternal grandparents were Antoninus Pius and Faustina the Elder, and her paternal grandparents were Domitia Lucilla and praetor Marcus Annius Verus. She was named in honor of her late paternal aunt Annia Cornificia Faustina.

== Life ==
Cornificia Faustina was born and raised in Rome and later, at age 15, married the African Roman politician Marcus Petronius Sura Mamertinus, who served as consul in 182. Sometime after 173, they had a son, Petronius Antoninus. It is possible that she and her family were at the winter camp where Marcus Aurelius died in early 180.

Her brother Commodus succeeded her father as emperor and, sometime between 190 and 192, he ordered the deaths of her husband, her son, her brother-in-law and her sister-in-law's family, due to their participation in a conspiracy. Cornificia survived the political executions of Commodus and later married Lucius Didius Marinus, a powerful Roman noble of equestrian rank who served as Procurator in various provinces. He later became a tax collector and tribune of the first Praetorian cohort.

During the brief reign of Pertinax (193), she was involved in an affair with the emperor. In 212, when she was in her fifties, Caracalla ordered her death and that of her son, thus eliminating the last surviving child of Marcus Aurelius and Faustina the Younger. Historian Cassius Dio recorded the manner of her death:

Her last words were 'My poor, unhappy soul, trapped in an unworthy body, go forth, be free, show them that you are the daughter of Marcus Aurelius!' Then she took off her ornaments, composed herself, opened her veins, and died.

== Nerva–Antonine family tree ==
Nerva–Antonine family tree

Q. Marcius Barea Soranus	Q. Marcius Barea Sura	Antonia Furnilla	M. Cocceius Nerva	Sergia Plautilla	P. Aelius Hadrianus
Titus (r. 79–81)	Marcia Furnilla	Marcia	Trajanus Pater	Nerva (r. 96–98)	Ulpia (Note: Sister of Trajan's father: Giacosa (1977), p. 7.)	Aelius Hadrianus Marullinus
Flavia (Note: Giacosa (1977), p. 8.)	Marciana (Note: Levick (2014), p. 161.)	C. Salonius Matidius (Note: Husband of Ulpia Marciana: Levick (2014), p. 161.)	Trajan (r. 98–117)	Plotina	P. Acilius Attianus	P. Aelius Afer (Note: Giacosa (1977), p. 7.)	Paulina Major (Note: DIR contributor (Herbert W. Benario, 2000), "Hadrian".)
Lucius Mindius (2)	Libo Rupilius Frugi (3)	Salonia Matidia (Note: Giacosa (1977), p. 9.)	L. Vibius Sabinus (1) (Note: Husband of Salonia Matidia: Levick (2014), p. 161.)
Paulina Minor	L. Julius Ursus Servianus (Note: Smith (1870), "Julius Servianus".)
Matidia Minor	Sabina	Hadrian (Note: Smith (1870), "Hadrian", pp. 319–322.) (r. 117–138)	Antinous (Note: Lover of Hadrian: Lambert (1984), p. 99 and passim; deification: Lambert (1984), pp. 2–5, etc.)
C. Fuscus Salinator I	Julia Serviana Paulina
M. Annius Verus (Note: Husband of Rupilia Faustina: Levick (2014), p. 163.)	Rupilia Faustina (Note: Levick (2014), p. 163.) (Note: It is uncertain whether Rupilia Faustina was Frugi's daughter by Salonia Matidia or another woman.)	Boionia Procilla	Cn. Arrius Antoninus
L. Ceionius Commodus	Appia Severa	C. Fuscus Salinator II
L. Caesennius Paetus	Arria Antonina	Arria Fadilla (Note: Levick (2014), p. 162.)	T. Aurelius Fulvus
L. Caesennius Antoninus	L. Commodus	Plautia	unknown (Note: Levick (2014), p. 164.)	C. Avidius Nigrinus
M. Annius Verus	Calvisia Domitia Lucilla (Note: Wife of M. Annius Verus: Giacosa (1977), p. 10.)	Fundania (Note: Wife of M. Annius Libo: Levick (2014), p. 163.)	M. Annius Libo	Faustina	Antoninus Pius (r. 138–161)	L. Aelius Caesar	Avidia
Cornificia	Marcus Aurelius (r. 161–180) (Note: Giacosa (1977), p. 10.)	Faustina Minor	Aurelia Fadilla	Lucius Verus (r. 161–169) (1)	Ceionia Fabia	Plautius Quintillus (Note: Husband of Ceionia Fabia: Levick (2014), p. 164.)	Q. Servilius Pudens	Ceionia Plautia
Cornificia Minor (Note: Levick (2014), p. 117.)	M. Petronius Sura	Commodus (r. 177–192)	Fadilla	M. Annius Verus Caesar	Ti. Claudius Pompeianus (2)	Lucilla	M. Plautius Quintillus	Junius Licinius Balbus	Servilia Ceionia
Petronius Antoninus	L. Aurelius Agaclytus (2)	Aurelia Sabina	L. Antistius Burrus (1)	Plautius Quintillus	Plautia Servilla	C. Furius Sabinus Timesitheus	Maecia Faustina	Junius Licinius Balbus?
Furia Sabinia Tranquillina	Gordian III (r. 238–244)

- (1) = 1st spouse
- (2) = 2nd spouse
- (3) = 3rd spouse
- Reddish-purple indicates emperor of the Nerva–Antonine dynasty
  lighter purple indicates designated imperial heir of said dynasty who never reigned
  grey indicates unsuccessful imperial aspirants
  bluish-purple indicates emperors of other dynasties
- dashed lines indicate adoption; dotted lines indicate love affairs/unmarried relationships
- Small Caps = posthumously deified (Augusti, Augustae, or other)

Notes:

Except where otherwise noted, the notes below indicate that an individual's parentage is as shown in the above family tree.

References:
- DIR contributors (2000). "De Imperatoribus Romanis: An Online Encyclopedia of Roman Rulers and Their Families".
- Giacosa, Giorgio (1977). Women of the Caesars: Their Lives and Portraits on Coins. Translated by Holloway, R. Ross. Milan: Edizioni Arte e Moneta. ISBN 0-8390-0193-2.
- Lambert, Royston (1984). Beloved and God: The Story of Hadrian and Antinous. New York: Viking. ISBN 0-670-15708-2.
- Levick, Barbara (2014). Faustina I and II: Imperial Women of the Golden Age. Oxford University Press. ISBN 978-0-19-537941-9.
- Smith, William, ed. (1870). Dictionary of Greek and Roman Biography and Mythology.

== Sources ==
- Septimius Severus: the African emperor, By Anthony Richard Birley Edition: 2 – 1999
- Roman social history: a sourcebook By Tim G. Parkin, Arthur John Pomeroy 2007
- A commentary on the Letters of M. Cornelius Fronto, By Michael Petrus Josephus van den Hout, Marcus Cornelius Fronto 1999
- From Tiberius to the Antonines: a history of the Roman Empire AD 14–192, by Albino Garzetti, 1974.
- Stefan Priwitzer, Faustina minor - Ehefrau eines Idealkaisers und Mutter eines Tyrannen quellenkritische Untersuchungen zum dynastischen Potential, zur Darstellung und zu Handlungsspielraeumen von Kaiserfrauen im Prinzipat (Bonn: Dr. Rudolf Habelt, 2008) (Tuebinger althistorische Studien, 6).
