= Fadilla =

Daughter of Roman Emperor Marcus Aurelius

- Born: c. 159; Rome, Italy
- Died: after 211
- Spouse: Marcus Peducaeus Plautius Quintillus
- Dynasty: Nerva–Antonine
- Father: Marcus Aurelius
- Mother: Faustina the Younger

Annia Aurelia Fadilla, most commonly known as Fadilla (c. 159 – after 211) was one of the daughters born to Marcus Aurelius and his wife Faustina the Younger. She was a sister to Lucilla and Commodus. Fadilla was named in honor of her late maternal aunt Aurelia Fadilla. The cognomen Fadilla, was the cognomen of the mother and a half-sister of Antoninus Pius. Her maternal grandparents were Antoninus Pius and Faustina the Elder and her paternal grandparents were Domitia Lucilla and praetor Marcus Annius Verus.

== Life ==
Fadilla was born and raised in Rome. During the reign of her father, she married Marcus Peducaeus Plautius Quintillus, a Roman senator who later served twice as consul and as Augur, and who was a nephew of Roman emperor Lucius Verus (who had co-ruled with her father from 161 to 169 and through adoption was her uncle). The mother of Plautius Quintillus was Ceionia Fabia, sister of Lucius Verus. Fadilla bore Marcus Peducaeus Plautius Quintillus two children: a son, (Plautius) Quintillus, and a daughter, Plautia Servilla.

When her father died in 180, her remaining brother Commodus succeeded him as Roman emperor. During Commodus' reign, Fadilla and her family lived in a private palace on Capitoline Hill in Rome which was later bestowed by the later Roman emperor Elagabalus (218–222) as one of his mother's favorite residences. Her husband became one of Commodus' main advisers.

According to Herodian (History of the Roman Empire 1.13.1), Fadilla warned Commodus about Marcus Aurelius Cleander, a Praetorian prefect, who was becoming too powerful. With the help from one of her sisters, she uncovered and revealed a palace conspiracy aimed at the removal of Commodus in 189.

== Nerva–Antonine family tree ==
Nerva–Antonine family tree

Q. Marcius Barea Soranus	Q. Marcius Barea Sura	Antonia Furnilla	M. Cocceius Nerva	Sergia Plautilla	P. Aelius Hadrianus
Titus (r. 79–81)	Marcia Furnilla	Marcia	Trajanus Pater	Nerva (r. 96–98)	Ulpia (Note: Sister of Trajan's father: Giacosa (1977), p. 7.)	Aelius Hadrianus Marullinus
Flavia (Note: Giacosa (1977), p. 8.)	Marciana (Note: Levick (2014), p. 161.)	C. Salonius Matidius (Note: Husband of Ulpia Marciana: Levick (2014), p. 161.)	Trajan (r. 98–117)	Plotina	P. Acilius Attianus	P. Aelius Afer (Note: Giacosa (1977), p. 7.)	Paulina Major (Note: DIR contributor (Herbert W. Benario, 2000), "Hadrian".)
Lucius Mindius (2)	Libo Rupilius Frugi (3)	Salonia Matidia (Note: Giacosa (1977), p. 9.)	L. Vibius Sabinus (1) (Note: Husband of Salonia Matidia: Levick (2014), p. 161.)
Paulina Minor	L. Julius Ursus Servianus (Note: Smith (1870), "Julius Servianus".)
Matidia Minor	Sabina	Hadrian (Note: Smith (1870), "Hadrian", pp. 319–322.) (r. 117–138)	Antinous (Note: Lover of Hadrian: Lambert (1984), p. 99 and passim; deification: Lambert (1984), pp. 2–5, etc.)
C. Fuscus Salinator I	Julia Serviana Paulina
M. Annius Verus (Note: Husband of Rupilia Faustina: Levick (2014), p. 163.)	Rupilia Faustina (Note: Levick (2014), p. 163.) (Note: It is uncertain whether Rupilia Faustina was Frugi's daughter by Salonia Matidia or another woman.)	Boionia Procilla	Cn. Arrius Antoninus
L. Ceionius Commodus	Appia Severa	C. Fuscus Salinator II
L. Caesennius Paetus	Arria Antonina	Arria Fadilla (Note: Levick (2014), p. 162.)	T. Aurelius Fulvus
L. Caesennius Antoninus	L. Commodus	Plautia	unknown (Note: Levick (2014), p. 164.)	C. Avidius Nigrinus
M. Annius Verus	Calvisia Domitia Lucilla (Note: Wife of M. Annius Verus: Giacosa (1977), p. 10.)	Fundania (Note: Wife of M. Annius Libo: Levick (2014), p. 163.)	M. Annius Libo	Faustina	Antoninus Pius (r. 138–161)	L. Aelius Caesar	Avidia
Cornificia	Marcus Aurelius (r. 161–180) (Note: Giacosa (1977), p. 10.)	Faustina Minor	Aurelia Fadilla	Lucius Verus (r. 161–169) (1)	Ceionia Fabia	Plautius Quintillus (Note: Husband of Ceionia Fabia: Levick (2014), p. 164.)	Q. Servilius Pudens	Ceionia Plautia
Cornificia Minor (Note: Levick (2014), p. 117.)	M. Petronius Sura	Commodus (r. 177–192)	Fadilla	M. Annius Verus Caesar	Ti. Claudius Pompeianus (2)	Lucilla	M. Plautius Quintillus	Junius Licinius Balbus	Servilia Ceionia
Petronius Antoninus	L. Aurelius Agaclytus (2)	Aurelia Sabina	L. Antistius Burrus (1)	Plautius Quintillus	Plautia Servilla	C. Furius Sabinus Timesitheus	Maecia Faustina	Junius Licinius Balbus?
Furia Sabinia Tranquillina	Gordian III (r. 238–244)

- (1) = 1st spouse
- (2) = 2nd spouse
- (3) = 3rd spouse
- Reddish-purple indicates emperor of the Nerva–Antonine dynasty
  lighter purple indicates designated imperial heir of said dynasty who never reigned
  grey indicates unsuccessful imperial aspirants
  bluish-purple indicates emperors of other dynasties
- dashed lines indicate adoption; dotted lines indicate love affairs/unmarried relationships
- Small Caps = posthumously deified (Augusti, Augustae, or other)

Notes:

Except where otherwise noted, the notes below indicate that an individual's parentage is as shown in the above family tree.

References:
- DIR contributors (2000). "De Imperatoribus Romanis: An Online Encyclopedia of Roman Rulers and Their Families".
- Giacosa, Giorgio (1977). Women of the Caesars: Their Lives and Portraits on Coins. Translated by Holloway, R. Ross. Milan: Edizioni Arte e Moneta. ISBN 0-8390-0193-2.
- Lambert, Royston (1984). Beloved and God: The Story of Hadrian and Antinous. New York: Viking. ISBN 0-670-15708-2.
- Levick, Barbara (2014). Faustina I and II: Imperial Women of the Golden Age. Oxford University Press. ISBN 978-0-19-537941-9.
- Smith, William, ed. (1870). Dictionary of Greek and Roman Biography and Mythology.

== Sources ==
- "Women of History - F". A Bit of History.
- Lendering, Jona (2007). "Fadilla". Jona Lendering. Livius.org.
