= Ceionia Fabia =

2nd century Roman noblewoman

Ceionia Fabia (flourished 2nd century) was a noble Roman woman and a member of the ruling Nerva–Antonine dynasty of the Roman Empire.

== Life ==
Fabia was the first-born daughter to Lucius Aelius and Avidia. In 136, her father was adopted by Hadrian as heir to the throne. Fabia had three siblings: a sister Ceionia Plautia and two brothers: the Roman Emperor Lucius Verus who co-ruled with Marcus Aurelius from 161 to 169 and Gaius Avidius Ceionius Commodus. Her cognomen Fabia reveals that her father was related to the gens Fabia. However, whom she was named after from the gens Fabia is unknown. Fabia was born and raised in Rome.

Her maternal grandparents were the Roman Senator Gaius Avidius Nigrinus and the surmised but undocumented noblewoman Plautia. Although her adoptive paternal grandparents were the Roman Emperor Hadrian and Roman Empress Vibia Sabina, her biological paternal grandparents were the consul Lucius Ceionius Commodus and noblewoman named Plautia.

Sometime in 136 after Hadrian announced that her father was to be the Emperor's official heir, on the wishes of Hadrian, the emperor betrothed Fabia to Hadrian's great-nephew Marcus Aurelius. Although Fabia and Aurelius became engaged, the engagement did not survive Hadrian; immediately after the emperor's death, Antoninus Pius, Hadrian's second adopted son and the new emperor, approached Marcus and requested that his marriage arrangements be amended: Marcus' betrothal to Ceionia Fabia would be annulled, and he would be betrothed to Faustina, Antoninus' daughter, instead. Faustina's betrothal to Ceionia's brother Lucius Commodus would also have to be annulled. Marcus consented to Antoninus' proposal.

Fabia later married the nobleman Plautius Quintillus who came from a family of consular rank. During the reign of Antoninus Pius (138-161), Quintillus served as an ordinary consul in 159. Fabia bore Quintillus a son called Marcus Peducaeus Plautius Quintillus who later married Annia Aurelia Fadilla, one of the daughters of Marcus Aurelius and Faustina the Younger.

Throughout the Roman Empire, various honorific inscriptions have survived being dedicated to Fabia and her family. These inscriptions honor Fabia as the mother of Marcus Peducaeus Plautius Quintillus; the sister of Roman Emperor Lucius Verus and the sister-in-law of Empress Lucilla (the second daughter of Marcus Aurelius and Faustina the Younger, who was one of the sisters of Fadilla). According to an inscription found at Ephesus, Fabia was present when Lucius Verus married Lucilla.

It appears by 175 her husband had died. When Faustina the Younger had died in 175, Fabia was said to have attempted to interest Marcus Aurelius in a second marriage.

== Nerva–Antonine family tree ==
Nerva–Antonine family tree

Q. Marcius Barea Soranus	Q. Marcius Barea Sura	Antonia Furnilla	M. Cocceius Nerva	Sergia Plautilla	P. Aelius Hadrianus
Titus (r. 79–81)	Marcia Furnilla	Marcia	Trajanus Pater	Nerva (r. 96–98)	Ulpia (Note: Sister of Trajan's father: Giacosa (1977), p. 7.)	Aelius Hadrianus Marullinus
Flavia (Note: Giacosa (1977), p. 8.)	Marciana (Note: Levick (2014), p. 161.)	C. Salonius Matidius (Note: Husband of Ulpia Marciana: Levick (2014), p. 161.)	Trajan (r. 98–117)	Plotina	P. Acilius Attianus	P. Aelius Afer (Note: Giacosa (1977), p. 7.)	Paulina Major (Note: DIR contributor (Herbert W. Benario, 2000), "Hadrian".)
Lucius Mindius (2)	Libo Rupilius Frugi (3)	Salonia Matidia (Note: Giacosa (1977), p. 9.)	L. Vibius Sabinus (1) (Note: Husband of Salonia Matidia: Levick (2014), p. 161.)
Paulina Minor	L. Julius Ursus Servianus (Note: Smith (1870), "Julius Servianus".)
Matidia Minor	Sabina	Hadrian (Note: Smith (1870), "Hadrian", pp. 319–322.) (r. 117–138)	Antinous (Note: Lover of Hadrian: Lambert (1984), p. 99 and passim; deification: Lamber (1984), pp. 2–5, etc.)
C. Fuscus Salinator I	Julia Serviana Paulina
M. Annius Verus (Note: Husband of Rupilia Faustina: Levick (2014), p. 163.)	Rupilia Faustina (Note: Levick (2014), p. 163.) (Note: It is uncertain whether Rupilia Faustina was Frugi's daughter by Salonia Matidia or another woman.)	Boionia Procilla	Cn. Arrius Antoninus
L. Ceionius Commodus	Appia Severa	C. Fuscus Salinator II
L. Caesennius Paetus	Arria Antonina	Arria Fadilla (Note: Levick (2014), p. 162.)	T. Aurelius Fulvus
L. Caesennius Antoninus	L. Commodus	Plautia	unknown (Note: Levick (2014), p. 164.)	C. Avidius Nigrinus
M. Annius Verus	Calvisia Domitia Lucilla (Note: Wife of M. Annius Verus: Giacosa (1977), p. 10.)	Fundania (Note: Wife of M. Annius Libo: Levick (2014), p. 163.)	M. Annius Libo	Faustina	Antoninus Pius (r. 138–161)	L. Aelius Caesar	Avidia
Cornificia	Marcus Aurelius (r. 161–180) (Note: Giacosa (1977), p. 10.)	Faustina Minor	C. Avidius Cassius (Note: The epitomator of Cassius Dio (72.22) gives the story that Faustina the Elder promised to marry Avidius Cassius. This is also echoed in HA "Marcus Aurelius" 24.)	Aurelia Fadilla	Lucius Verus (r. 161–169) (1)	Ceionia Fabia	Plautius Quintillus (Note: Husband of Ceionia Fabia: Levick (2014), p. 164.)	Q. Servilius Pudens	Ceionia Plautia
Cornificia Minor (Note: Levick (2014), p. 117.)	M. Petronius Sura	Commodus (r. 177–192)	Fadilla	M. Annius Verus Caesar	Ti. Claudius Pompeianus (2)	Lucilla	M. Plautius Quintillus	Junius Licinius Balbus	Servilia Ceionia
Petronius Antoninus	L. Aurelius Agaclytus (2)	Aurelia Sabina	L. Antistius Burrus (1)	Plautius Quintillus	Plautia Servilla	C. Furius Sabinus Timesitheus	Maecia Faustina	Junius Licinius Balbus?
Furia Sabinia Tranquillina	Gordian III (r. 238–244)

- (1) = 1st spouse
- (2) = 2nd spouse
- (3) = 3rd spouse
- Reddish-purple indicates emperor of the Nerva–Antonine dynasty
  lighter purple indicates designated imperial heir of said dynasty who never reigned
  grey indicates unsuccessful imperial aspirants
  bluish-purple indicates emperors of other dynasties
- dashed lines indicate adoption; dotted lines indicate love affairs/unmarried relationships
- Small Caps = posthumously deified (Augusti, Augustae, or other)

Notes:

Except where otherwise noted, the notes below indicate that an individual's parentage is as shown in the above family tree.

References:
- Giacosa, Giorgio (1977). Women of the Caesars: Their Lives and Portraits on Coins. Translated by Holloway, R. Ross. Milan: Edizioni Arte e Moneta. ISBN 0-8390-0193-2.
- Lambert, Royston (1984). Beloved and God: The Story of Hadrian and Antinous. New York: Viking. ISBN 0-670-15708-2.
- Levick, Barbara (2014). Faustina I and II: Imperial Women of the Golden Age. Oxford University Press. ISBN 978-0-19-537941-9.
- Smith, William, ed. (1870). Dictionary of Greek and Roman Biography and Mythology.

== Sources ==
- From Tiberius to the Antonines: a history of the Roman Empire AD 14–192, by Albino Garzetti, 1974
- Cassio Dione e l'impero romano da Nerva ad Antonino Pio: alla luce dei nuovi by Guido Migliorati, 2003 – Italian Historical Secondary Source
- The Cambridge ancient history, Volume 11 By Alan K. Bowman, Peter Garnsey, Dominic Rathbone Limited preview - Edition: 2 - Item notes: v. 11 – 2000
- Marcus Aurelius, by Anthony Richard Birley, Routledge, 2000
- roman-emperors.org
- https://web.archive.org/web/20130525075850/http://www.roman-empire.net/highpoint/marcaurelius.html
