= Aelius Hadrianus Marullinus =

1st century Hispanic Roman Senator

Publius Aelius Hadrianus Marullinus (c. 31 – c. 91 AD), also known as Aelius Hadrianus Marullinus or Aelius Marullinus, was a Roman Senator of Praetorian rank from Hispania who lived in the Roman Empire during the 1st century.

== Family ==
Marullinus came from a well-established, wealthy and aristocratic family of Praetorian rank in the gens Aelia. His mother is unknown and his father was a Roman senator called Publius Aelius Hadrianus Marullinus, also the name of his paternal grandfather and paternal great-grandfather.

The paternal ancestors of Marullinus had descended from Picenum (modern Marche and Abruzzo, Italy). They were originally centurions who participated in the Punic Wars possibly under the general Scipio Africanus. About 205 BC, at the end of the Second Punic War, the paternal ancestors of Marullinus left Picenum and settled in Italica (near modern Seville, Spain) in the Roman Province of Hispania Baetica.

The paternal great-grandfather of Marullinus, Publius Aelius Hadrianus Marullinus, was admitted into the Roman Senate by Octavian (future Emperor Augustus) when he served as a member of the Second Triumvirate between 43 BC and 33 BC. He was the first person in his family to become a senator, however the circumstances leading him to be admitted into the senate are unknown. Nevertheless, Marullinus was one of the few Romans that came from the provinces who Octavian had ever admitted into the Senate.

== History ==
Marullinus was born and raised in Italica, but spent various amounts of time in Rome. He married a noblewoman from Italica called Ulpia, who was a sister of the Roman general and senator Marcus Ulpius Traianus, the father of Emperor Trajan.

Ulpia and Marullinus had at least one child, a son called Publius Aelius Hadrianus Afer, who later was a soldier and politician. Hadrianus Afer married Domitia Paulina and had two children: Aelia Domitia Paulina (75–130) and Publius Aelius Hadrianus (76–138). Hadrianus was adopted by Trajan as his heir and eventually succeeded him as Emperor Hadrian.

Marullinus had a reputation in practising astrology and had predicted that his grandson would rule as Roman Emperor.

When Hadrian ruled as Roman Emperor, as a tribute to his birthplace and ancestry, he established Hispania Baetica as a province. Hadrian's second adoptive son and successor Antoninus Pius, assumed the name Aelius Hadrianus as a part of his name when he ruled as Emperor. The sixth child born to Roman Emperor Marcus Aurelius and Roman Empress Faustina the Younger was named Hadrianus. Hadrianus (152–157) was named in honour of his grandfather Hadrian.

== Nerva–Antonine family tree ==
Nerva–Antonine family tree

Q. Marcius Barea Soranus	Q. Marcius Barea Sura	Antonia Furnilla	M. Cocceius Nerva	Sergia Plautilla	P. Aelius Hadrianus
Titus (r. 79–81)	Marcia Furnilla	Marcia	Trajanus Pater	Nerva (r. 96–98)	Ulpia (Note: Sister of Trajan's father: Giacosa (1977), p. 7.)	Aelius Hadrianus Marullinus
Flavia (Note: Giacosa (1977), p. 8.)	Marciana (Note: Levick (2014), p. 161.)	C. Salonius Matidius (Note: Husband of Ulpia Marciana: Levick (2014), p. 161.)	Trajan (r. 98–117)	Plotina	P. Acilius Attianus	P. Aelius Afer (Note: Giacosa (1977), p. 7.)	Paulina Major (Note: DIR contributor (Herbert W. Benario, 2000), "Hadrian".)
Lucius Mindius (2)	Libo Rupilius Frugi (3)	Salonia Matidia (Note: Giacosa (1977), p. 9.)	L. Vibius Sabinus (1) (Note: Husband of Salonia Matidia: Levick (2014), p. 161.)
Paulina Minor	L. Julius Ursus Servianus (Note: Smith (1870), "Julius Servianus".)
Matidia Minor	Sabina	Hadrian (Note: Smith (1870), "Hadrian", pp. 319–322.) (r. 117–138)	Antinous (Note: Lover of Hadrian: Lambert (1984), p. 99 and passim; deification: Lamber (1984), pp. 2–5, etc.)
C. Fuscus Salinator I	Julia Serviana Paulina
M. Annius Verus (Note: Husband of Rupilia Faustina: Levick (2014), p. 163.)	Rupilia Faustina (Note: Levick (2014), p. 163.) (Note: It is uncertain whether Rupilia Faustina was Frugi's daughter by Salonia Matidia or another woman.)	Boionia Procilla	Cn. Arrius Antoninus
L. Ceionius Commodus	Appia Severa	C. Fuscus Salinator II
L. Caesennius Paetus	Arria Antonina	Arria Fadilla (Note: Levick (2014), p. 162.)	T. Aurelius Fulvus
L. Caesennius Antoninus	L. Commodus	Plautia	unknown (Note: Levick (2014), p. 164.)	C. Avidius Nigrinus
M. Annius Verus	Calvisia Domitia Lucilla (Note: Wife of M. Annius Verus: Giacosa (1977), p. 10.)	Fundania (Note: Wife of M. Annius Libo: Levick (2014), p. 163.)	M. Annius Libo	Faustina	Antoninus Pius (r. 138–161)	L. Aelius Caesar	Avidia
Cornificia	Marcus Aurelius (r. 161–180) (Note: Giacosa (1977), p. 10.)	Faustina Minor	C. Avidius Cassius (Note: The epitomator of Cassius Dio (72.22) gives the story that Faustina the Elder promised to marry Avidius Cassius. This is also echoed in HA "Marcus Aurelius" 24.)	Aurelia Fadilla	Lucius Verus (r. 161–169) (1)	Ceionia Fabia	Plautius Quintillus (Note: Husband of Ceionia Fabia: Levick (2014), p. 164.)	Q. Servilius Pudens	Ceionia Plautia
Cornificia Minor (Note: Levick (2014), p. 117.)	M. Petronius Sura	Commodus (r. 177–192)	Fadilla	M. Annius Verus Caesar	Ti. Claudius Pompeianus (2)	Lucilla	M. Plautius Quintillus	Junius Licinius Balbus	Servilia Ceionia
Petronius Antoninus	L. Aurelius Agaclytus (2)	Aurelia Sabina	L. Antistius Burrus (1)	Plautius Quintillus	Plautia Servilla	C. Furius Sabinus Timesitheus	Maecia Faustina	Junius Licinius Balbus?
Furia Sabina Tranquillina	Gordian III (r. 238–244)

- (1) = 1st spouse
- (2) = 2nd spouse
- (3) = 3rd spouse
- Reddish-purple indicates emperor of the Nerva–Antonine dynasty
  lighter purple indicates designated imperial heir of said dynasty who never reigned
  grey indicates unsuccessful imperial aspirants
  bluish-purple indicates emperors of other dynasties
- dashed lines indicate adoption; dotted lines indicate love affairs/unmarried relationships
- Small Caps = posthumously deified (Augusti, Augustae, or other)

Notes:

Except where otherwise noted, the notes below indicate that an individual's parentage is as shown in the above family tree.

References:
- DIR contributors (2000). "De Imperatoribus Romanis: An Online Encyclopedia of Roman Rulers and Their Families".
- Giacosa, Giorgio (1977). Women of the Caesars: Their Lives and Portraits on Coins. Translated by R. Ross Holloway. Milan: Edizioni Arte e Moneta. ISBN 0-8390-0193-2.
- Lambert, Royston (1984). Beloved and God: The Story of Hadrian and Antinous. New York: Viking. ISBN 0-670-15708-2.
- Levick, Barbara (2014). Faustina I and II: Imperial Women of the Golden Age. Oxford University Press. ISBN 978-0-19-537941-9.
- Smith, William, ed. (1870). Dictionary of Greek and Roman Biography and Mythology.

== Sources ==
- Historia Augusta – Life of Hadrian
- Tiberius the Politician – Ed2, By Barbara Levick, Levick B Staff
- Marcus Aurelius By Anthony Richard Birley
- The provincial at Rome, By Ronald Syme, Anthony Birley
- Rome and the Balkans 80 BC – AD 14 By Ronald Syme, Anthony Birley
