= Agaclytus (freedman) =

2nd century freedman of emperor Marcus Aurelius

Agaclytus was a freedman of Roman Emperor Marcus Aurelius, said to have had great influence over Aurelius and his co-emperor, Lucius Verus. He was given in marriage to the widow of Marcus Aurelius' cousin, Marcus Annius Libo by Verus, over the objections of Aurelius, who declined to attend the wedding banquet. It is one of the few—if not only—examples in ancient Rome of a freedman marrying someone from the senatorial class. Agaclytus's son by this marriage, Lucius Aurelius Agaclytus, went on to become the second husband of Vibia Aurelia Sabina, the youngest daughter of Aurelius. The Augustan History reports a rumor that a plot against Marcus Aurelius fomented by his wife, Faustina the Younger, was quashed when Agaclytus reported its existence to Aurelius; however, there were numerous rumors of Faustina's misbehavior, and Aurelius vigorously denounced them all as untrue.

== See also ==
- Nerva–Antonine dynasty
