= Quintus Servilius Pudens =

Second century AD Roman senator and governor

Quintus Servilius Pudens was a Roman senator active during the second century AD. He was ordinary consul for the year 166 with Lucius Fufidius Pollio as his colleague, and he was proconsular governor of Africa around 180. Pudens is known only through surviving inscriptions.

Pudens may be related to Marcus Servilius Silanus, consul in 152 and 188, and both may be related to the consul of 189, Quintus Servilius Silanus. Pudens is confidently known to have married Ceionia Plautia, daughter of Lucius Aelius, the adopted son of the emperor Hadrian. His mansion in Rome has been located; the associated baths have been found and excavated in part.

There appear to have been two Servilii Pudentes living about the same time: an inscription attests that a man of the same name was prefectus frumenti dandi, juridicus of Regio VIII Aemilia, and governor of Crete and Cyrenaica. Géza Alföldy notes that juridici for the districts of Italy did not come into existence until 166, and were praetorian offices held prior to the consulate. Because any son of Pudens the consul would be related to the imperial family, this relationship would excuse him from holding praetorian offices; the younger Quintus Servilius Pudens might then be the nephew of the consul of 166.

== See also ==
- Servilia (gens)

Political offices
Preceded by Marcus Gavius Orfitus, and Lucius Arrius Pudens as ordinary consuls	Consul of the Roman Empire; 166 with Lucius Fufidius Pollio	Succeeded by Marcus Vibius Liberalis, and Publius Martius Verus as suffect consuls
