= Barbara Levick =

British historian and epigrapher (1931–2023)

- Born: 21 June 1931; London
- Died: 6 December 2023 (aged 92)
- Education: University of Oxford (DPhil)

Barbara Mary Levick (21 June 1931 – 6 December 2023) was a British historian and epigrapher, focusing particularly on the Late Roman Republic and Early Empire. She was recognised within her field as one of the leading Roman historians of her generation.

== Early life and education ==
Barbara Mary Levick was born in London on 21 June 1931, the daughter of Frank Thomas and Mary (née Smart) Levick. She was educated at Brighton and Hove High School and St Hugh's College, Oxford. Her DPhil, on the subject of Roman colonies in South Asia Minor was undertaken in the mid-1950s and supervised by Ronald Syme. For this research she made two solo trips to Turkey, placing herself in a tradition at this time of largely Scottish and male epigraphers travelling in Anatolia. She focused, however, on Pisidia, a region that lay away from the routes explored by a group of her male contemporaries, although she was the only one to publish a book as a result of research from these expeditions.

== Career ==
In 1959, Levick was appointed a university fellow and tutor for Roman History at St Hilda's College, Oxford, and in 1967 published her first monograph, drawing on material from her doctoral thesis, which forty years after its publication was described as a "resilient classic of Roman history". The importance of this work came from both its focus on the Roman impact on Asia Minor, and the drawing together of both epigraphic and numismatic evidence. In this work she used the discoveries she made at Yalvaç in Turkey, and considered again material that had been neglected since the 1920s.

Levick was an influential editor of inscriptions who shaped the format of the Monumenta Asiae Minoris Antiqua series, directing two volumes of its publication. Her biographies of Roman emperors and Imperial women are widely known and receive largely positive reviews from their critics.

Her portrait was painted for St Hilda's College by Jane Cursham.

== Death ==
Levick died on 6 December 2023, at the age of 92.

== Selected publications ==
A fuller bibliography of her works up to 2007 can be found in the Bulletin of the Institute of Classical Studies. Supplement, No. 100, VITA VIGILIA EST: ESSAYS IN HONOUR OF BARBARA LEVICK (2007).

=== Books ===
- Roman colonies in southern Asia Minor (Oxford: the Clarendon Press, 1967)
- Faustina I and II: Imperial Women of the Golden Age (Oxford: Oxford University Press, 2014)
- Julia Domna, Syrian Empress (London: Routledge, 2007)
- The Government of the Roman Empire. A Sourcebook (London: Routledge, 1985)
- Claudius (1990); this biography was translated into French in 2002 by historian Isabelle Cogitore.
- The Year of the Four Emperors (2000)
- Vespasian (1999)
- Tiberius the Politician. London: Thames and Hudson, 1976. Reprint, London: Croom Helm, 1988. ISBN 0-7099-4132-3.
- Augustus: Image and Substance. London: Longman, 2010. ISBN 9780582894211.
- Catiline. London: Bloomsbury, 2015. ISBN 9781472534897.

=== Articles ===
- Two Pisidian Colonial Families. In: The Journal of Roman Studies, Vol. 48, No. 1/2 (1958), pp. 74–78
- Acerbissima Lex Servilia. In: The Classical Review, New Series, Vol. 17, No. 3 (Dec., 1967), pp. 256–258
- A Cry from the Heart from Tiberius Caesar?. In: Historia: Zeitschrift für Alte Geschichte, Vol. 27, No. 1 (1st Qtr., 1978), pp. 95–101
- Poena Legis Maiestatis. In: Historia: Zeitschrift für Alte Geschichte, Vol. 28, No. 3 (3rd Qtr., 1979), pp. 358–379
- Claudius Speaks: Two Imperial Contretemps. In: Historia: Zeitschrift für Alte Geschichte, Vol. 38, No. 1 (1st Qtr., 1989), pp. 112–116
- Abdication and Agrippa Postumus. In: Historia: Zeitschrift für Alte Geschichte, Vol. 21, No. 4 (4th Qtr., 1972), pp. 674–697
- The Beginning of Tiberius' Career. In: The Classical Quarterly, New Series, Vol. 21, No. 2 (Nov., 1971), pp. 478–486
- Cicero, Brutus 43. 159 ff., and the Foundation of Narbo Martius. In: The Classical Quarterly, New Series, Vol. 21, No. 1 (May, 1971), pp. 170–179
