= Lucius Julius Ursus Servianus =

Iberian Roman politician and consul (45 – 136 AD)

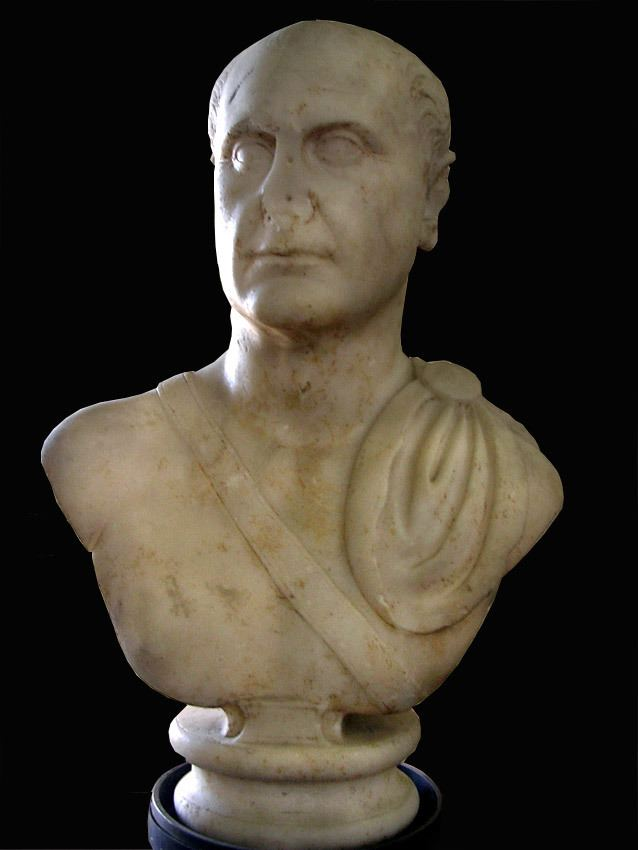
Lucius Julius Ursus Servianus

Lucius Julius Ursus Servianus (45 – 136 AD) was an Iberian Roman politician. He was a prominent public figure in the reigns of Roman emperors Nerva, Trajan and Hadrian. He was the last private citizen to receive a third consulship; such honors came to be reserved for members of the emperor's family.

According to an inscription found, his full name is Gaius Julius Servilius Ursus Servianus, however, in the Augustan History, he is known as Lucius Julius Ursus Servianus.

== Life ==
Little is known about his origins. Ronald Syme has argued that he was originally named Servius Julius Servianus, suffect consul in 90, and that Lucius Julius Ursus adopted him after that year, leading to a name change; no scholar has spoken against this identification, and it has been considered accepted by all. Before the accession of Trajan in 98, Servianus had married Aelia Domitia Paulina, the elder sister of Hadrian, who was thirty years younger than he was. During Trajan's reign (98–117), Paulina and Servianus had a daughter called Julia Serviana Paulina.

When Nerva died on January 27 of the year 98, Hadrian travelled to Germany to find Trajan, to announce the death of Nerva. Servianus tried unsuccessfully to stop Hadrian's travel to Germany, because he was jealous of the favor shown Hadrian by Trajan. However, Servianus and Hadrian reconciled and were for a long time on good terms.

Servianus served twice as consul under Trajan, and once as consul under Hadrian in 134. As a senator he was a very influential and powerful man. Trajan appointed him governor of Germania Inferior for 97 to 99, and immediately afterwards made him governor of Pannonia for 99 to 100, granting him important military commands against Dacia.

Servianus was a friend to the Senator and historian Pliny the Younger; two of Pliny's surviving letters are addressed to him, and Pliny mentions him in two more. Through Servianus' influence, Trajan granted Pliny immunities only usually granted to a father of three, the jus trium liberorum. Before Pliny's death around 111, Servianus and Paulina had arranged and married their daughter Julia to Gnaeus Pedanius Fuscus Salinator, ordinary consul in 118 as the colleague of emperor Hadrian. Pliny the Younger sent him and his wife a letter of congratulations about their daughter's wedding.

When Trajan died on August 8, 117, his cousin and adopted son Hadrian became emperor. As Emperor, Hadrian treated Servianus with distinguished honor, considering him to be his first successor. When Paulina died in 130, Hadrian and Servianus shared a private ceremony for her.

For a long time, the emperor Hadrian had considered Servianus as his unofficial successor. As Hadrian's reign drew to a close, however, he changed his mind. Although the emperor certainly thought Servianus capable of ruling as an emperor after Hadrian's own death, Servianus, by now in his nineties, was clearly too old for the position. Hadrian's attentions turned to Servianus' grandson, who was also named Lucius Pedanius Fuscus Salinator. Hadrian promoted the young Salinator, his great-nephew, gave him special status in his court, and groomed him as his heir. Servianus, who always cherished the idea that his youthful grandson would one day succeed his brother-in-law, was overjoyed.

However, in 136, Hadrian changed his mind and decided to adopt Lucius Aelius Caesar as his son and heir. Servianus and the younger Salinator were angry with Hadrian and wanted to challenge him over the adoption. It is possible Salinator went so far as to attempt a coup against Hadrian in which Servianus was implicated. In order to avoid any potential conflict in the succession, Hadrian ordered the deaths of Salinator and Servianus. Ironically, Aelius died before Hadrian in 138, forcing Hadrian to adopt Antoninus Pius.

== Nerva–Antonine family tree ==
Nerva–Antonine family tree

Q. Marcius Barea Soranus	Q. Marcius Barea Sura	Antonia Furnilla	M. Cocceius Nerva	Sergia Plautilla	P. Aelius Hadrianus
Titus (r. 79–81)	Marcia Furnilla	Marcia	Trajanus Pater	Nerva (r. 96–98)	Ulpia (Note: Sister of Trajan's father: Giacosa (1977), p. 7.)	Aelius Hadrianus Marullinus
Flavia (Note: Giacosa (1977), p. 8.)	Marciana (Note: Levick (2014), p. 161.)	C. Salonius Matidius (Note: Husband of Ulpia Marciana: Levick (2014), p. 161.)	Trajan (r. 98–117)	Plotina	P. Acilius Attianus	P. Aelius Afer (Note: Giacosa (1977), p. 7.)	Paulina Major (Note: DIR contributor (Herbert W. Benario, 2000), "Hadrian".)
Lucius Mindius (2)	Libo Rupilius Frugi (3)	Salonia Matidia (Note: Giacosa (1977), p. 9.)	L. Vibius Sabinus (1) (Note: Husband of Salonia Matidia: Levick (2014), p. 161.)
Paulina Minor	L. Julius Ursus Servianus (Note: Smith (1870), "Julius Servianus".)
Matidia Minor	Sabina	Hadrian (Note: Smith (1870), "Hadrian", pp. 319–322.) (r. 117–138)	Antinous (Note: Lover of Hadrian: Lambert (1984), p. 99 and passim; deification: Lambert (1984), pp. 2–5, etc.)
C. Fuscus Salinator I	Julia Serviana Paulina
M. Annius Verus (Note: Husband of Rupilia Faustina: Levick (2014), p. 163.)	Rupilia Faustina (Note: Levick (2014), p. 163.) (Note: It is uncertain whether Rupilia Faustina was Frugi's daughter by Salonia Matidia or another woman.)	Boionia Procilla	Cn. Arrius Antoninus
L. Ceionius Commodus	Appia Severa	C. Fuscus Salinator II
L. Caesennius Paetus	Arria Antonina	Arria Fadilla (Note: Levick (2014), p. 162.)	T. Aurelius Fulvus
L. Caesennius Antoninus	L. Commodus	Plautia	unknown (Note: Levick (2014), p. 164.)	C. Avidius Nigrinus
M. Annius Verus	Calvisia Domitia Lucilla (Note: Wife of M. Annius Verus: Giacosa (1977), p. 10.)	Fundania (Note: Wife of M. Annius Libo: Levick (2014), p. 163.)	M. Annius Libo	Faustina	Antoninus Pius (r. 138–161)	L. Aelius Caesar	Avidia
Cornificia	Marcus Aurelius (r. 161–180) (Note: Giacosa (1977), p. 10.)	Faustina Minor	Aurelia Fadilla	Lucius Verus (r. 161–169) (1)	Ceionia Fabia	Plautius Quintillus (Note: Husband of Ceionia Fabia: Levick (2014), p. 164.)	Q. Servilius Pudens	Ceionia Plautia
Cornificia Minor (Note: Levick (2014), p. 117.)	M. Petronius Sura	Commodus (r. 177–192)	Fadilla	M. Annius Verus Caesar	Ti. Claudius Pompeianus (2)	Lucilla	M. Plautius Quintillus	Junius Licinius Balbus	Servilia Ceionia
Petronius Antoninus	L. Aurelius Agaclytus (2)	Aurelia Sabina	L. Antistius Burrus (1)	Plautius Quintillus	Plautia Servilla	C. Furius Sabinus Timesitheus	Maecia Faustina	Junius Licinius Balbus?
Furia Sabinia Tranquillina	Gordian III (r. 238–244)

- (1) = 1st spouse
- (2) = 2nd spouse
- (3) = 3rd spouse
- Reddish-purple indicates emperor of the Nerva–Antonine dynasty
  lighter purple indicates designated imperial heir of said dynasty who never reigned
  grey indicates unsuccessful imperial aspirants
  bluish-purple indicates emperors of other dynasties
- dashed lines indicate adoption; dotted lines indicate love affairs/unmarried relationships
- Small Caps = posthumously deified (Augusti, Augustae, or other)

Notes:

Except where otherwise noted, the notes below indicate that an individual's parentage is as shown in the above family tree.

References:
- DIR contributors (2000). "De Imperatoribus Romanis: An Online Encyclopedia of Roman Rulers and Their Families".
- Giacosa, Giorgio (1977). Women of the Caesars: Their Lives and Portraits on Coins. Translated by Holloway, R. Ross. Milan: Edizioni Arte e Moneta. ISBN 0-8390-0193-2.
- Lambert, Royston (1984). Beloved and God: The Story of Hadrian and Antinous. New York: Viking. ISBN 0-670-15708-2.
- Levick, Barbara (2014). Faustina I and II: Imperial Women of the Golden Age. Oxford University Press. ISBN 978-0-19-537941-9.
- Smith, William, ed. (1870). Dictionary of Greek and Roman Biography and Mythology.

== Sources ==
- Augustan History – Hadrian
- https://web.archive.org/web/20070125184755/http://www.ancientlibrary.com/smith-bio/3125.html
- http://www.fofweb.com/Onfiles/Ancient/AncientDetail.asp?iPin=ROME1573
- https://www.newadvent.org/cathen/07104b.htm

Political offices
Preceded by Lucius Cornelius Pusio Annius Messala, and Marcus Cocceius Nerva II as Ordinary consuls	Suffect consul of the Roman Empire; 90 with Lucius Antistius Rusticus	Succeeded by Quintus Accaeus Rufus, and Gaius Caristanius Fronto as Suffect consuls
Preceded by Lucius Arruntius Stella, and Lucius Julius Marinus Caecilius Simplex as Suffect consuls	Consul of the Roman Empire; 102 with Lucius Licinius Sura II, followed by Lucius Fabius Justus	Succeeded by Titus Didius Secundus, and Lucius Publilius Celsus as Suffect consuls
Preceded by Tiberius Claudius Atticus Herodes, and Publius Sufenas Verus as Suffect consuls	Consul of the Roman Empire; 134 with Titus Vibius Varus	Succeeded by Titus Haterius Nepos as Suffect consul
