= Gnaeus Arrius Antoninus =

1st century AD Roman senator and consul

Gnaeus Arrius Antoninus (born 31) was the maternal grandfather of the Emperor Antoninus Pius.

== Life ==
A member of gens Arria, a family of consular rank, Antoninus was also an office holder, having been twice consul: the first time was in 69 with Aulus Marius Celsus as his colleague, and the second in 97 with Gaius Calpurnius Piso as his colleague. Antoninus was also proconsul of Asia in 78/79. Antoninus was a friend of and correspondent to the senator and historian Pliny the Younger. The Historia Augusta describes him as a "righteous person", who pitied Nerva when he became Emperor in 96. John Grainger notes "he was the senior figure in a potent aristocratic network which centered on Gallia Narbonensis and extended into Spain, whose members included T. Aurelius Fulvus, P. Julius Lupus and M. Annius Verus."

== Family ==
Antoninus married Boionia Procilla, by whom he had one son and two daughters: Gnaeus Arrius, Arria Antonina and Arria Fadilla. The first married an unknown woman with he had Gnaeus Arrius Augur, and Antonina married Lucius Iunius Caesennius Paetus, with who gave birth to Lucius Caesennius Antoninus. Fadilla married Titus Aurelius Fulvus, ordinary consul in 89; their only child was Titus Aurelius Fulvus Boionius Arrius Antoninus, who, as Antoninus Pius, became emperor (138-161). Antoninus Pius' father had died when he was young. Following Fulvus's death, Fadilla married Publius Julius Lupus, suffect consul in 98, and bore him two daughters, Julia Fadilla and Arria Lupula.

Antoninus raised his maternal grandson, and when he died Antoninus Pius inherited his money. Through the inheritances of both sides, Antoninus Pius became one of the wealthiest men in Rome.

== Nerva–Antonine family tree ==
Nerva–Antonine family tree

Q. Marcius Barea Soranus	Q. Marcius Barea Sura	Antonia Furnilla	M. Cocceius Nerva	Sergia Plautilla	P. Aelius Hadrianus
Titus (r. 79–81)	Marcia Furnilla	Marcia	Trajanus Pater	Nerva (r. 96–98)	Ulpia (Note: Sister of Trajan's father: Giacosa (1977), p. 7.)	Aelius Hadrianus Marullinus
Flavia (Note: Giacosa (1977), p. 8.)	Marciana (Note: Levick (2014), p. 161.)	C. Salonius Matidius (Note: Husband of Ulpia Marciana: Levick (2014), p. 161.)	Trajan (r. 98–117)	Plotina	P. Acilius Attianus	P. Aelius Afer (Note: Giacosa (1977), p. 7.)	Paulina Major (Note: DIR contributor (Herbert W. Benario, 2000), "Hadrian".)
Lucius Mindius (2)	Libo Rupilius Frugi (3)	Salonia Matidia (Note: Giacosa (1977), p. 9.)	L. Vibius Sabinus (1) (Note: Husband of Salonia Matidia: Levick (2014), p. 161.)
Paulina Minor	L. Julius Ursus Servianus (Note: Smith (1870), "Julius Servianus".)
Matidia Minor	Sabina	Hadrian (Note: Smith (1870), "Hadrian", pp. 319–322.) (r. 117–138)	Antinous (Note: Lover of Hadrian: Lambert (1984), p. 99 and passim; deification: Lamber (1984), pp. 2–5, etc.)
C. Fuscus Salinator I	Julia Serviana Paulina
M. Annius Verus (Note: Husband of Rupilia Faustina: Levick (2014), p. 163.)	Rupilia Faustina (Note: Levick (2014), p. 163.) (Note: It is uncertain whether Rupilia Faustina was Frugi's daughter by Salonia Matidia or another woman.)	Boionia Procilla	Cn. Arrius Antoninus
L. Ceionius Commodus	Appia Severa	C. Fuscus Salinator II
L. Caesennius Paetus	Arria Antonina	Arria Fadilla (Note: Levick (2014), p. 162.)	T. Aurelius Fulvus
L. Caesennius Antoninus	L. Commodus	Plautia	unknown (Note: Levick (2014), p. 164.)	C. Avidius Nigrinus
M. Annius Verus	Calvisia Domitia Lucilla (Note: Wife of M. Annius Verus: Giacosa (1977), p. 10.)	Fundania (Note: Wife of M. Annius Libo: Levick (2014), p. 163.)	M. Annius Libo	Faustina	Antoninus Pius (r. 138–161)	L. Aelius Caesar	Avidia
Cornificia	Marcus Aurelius (r. 161–180) (Note: Giacosa (1977), p. 10.)	Faustina Minor	C. Avidius Cassius (Note: The epitomator of Cassius Dio (72.22) gives the story that Faustina the Elder promised to marry Avidius Cassius. This is also echoed in HA "Marcus Aurelius" 24.)	Aurelia Fadilla	Lucius Verus (r. 161–169) (1)	Ceionia Fabia	Plautius Quintillus (Note: Husband of Ceionia Fabia: Levick (2014), p. 164.)	Q. Servilius Pudens	Ceionia Plautia
Cornificia Minor (Note: Levick (2014), p. 117.)	M. Petronius Sura	Commodus (r. 177–192)	Fadilla	M. Annius Verus Caesar	Ti. Claudius Pompeianus (2)	Lucilla	M. Plautius Quintillus	Junius Licinius Balbus	Servilia Ceionia
Petronius Antoninus	L. Aurelius Agaclytus (2)	Aurelia Sabina	L. Antistius Burrus (1)	Plautius Quintillus	Plautia Servilla	C. Furius Sabinus Timesitheus	Maecia Faustina	Junius Licinius Balbus?
Furia Sabina Tranquillina	Gordian III (r. 238–244)

- (1) = 1st spouse
- (2) = 2nd spouse
- (3) = 3rd spouse
- Reddish-purple indicates emperor of the Nerva–Antonine dynasty
  lighter purple indicates designated imperial heir of said dynasty who never reigned
  grey indicates unsuccessful imperial aspirants
  bluish-purple indicates emperors of other dynasties
- dashed lines indicate adoption; dotted lines indicate love affairs/unmarried relationships
- Small Caps = posthumously deified (Augusti, Augustae, or other)

Notes:

Except where otherwise noted, the notes below indicate that an individual's parentage is as shown in the above family tree.

References:
- DIR contributors (2000). "De Imperatoribus Romanis: An Online Encyclopedia of Roman Rulers and Their Families".
- Giacosa, Giorgio (1977). Women of the Caesars: Their Lives and Portraits on Coins. Translated by R. Ross Holloway. Milan: Edizioni Arte e Moneta. ISBN 0-8390-0193-2.
- Lambert, Royston (1984). Beloved and God: The Story of Hadrian and Antinous. New York: Viking. ISBN 0-670-15708-2.
- Levick, Barbara (2014). Faustina I and II: Imperial Women of the Golden Age. Oxford University Press. ISBN 978-0-19-537941-9.
- Smith, William, ed. (1870). Dictionary of Greek and Roman Biography and Mythology.

== Sources ==
- Antoninus Pius biography

Political offices
Preceded by Titus Flavius Sabinus, and Gnaeus Arulenus Caelius Sabinus	Consul of the Roman Empire; 69 with Aulus Marius Celsus	Succeeded by Fabius Valens, and Aulus Caecina Alienus
Preceded by Marcus Cocceius Nerva III, and Lucius Verginius Rufus III as Ordinary consuls	Suffect consul of the Roman Empire; 97 with Gaius Calpurnius Piso	Succeeded by Marcus Annius Verus, and Lucius Neratius Priscus as Suffect consuls
