= Gaius Avidius Nigrinus =

Roman senator and consul (died 118 AD)

Gaius Avidius Nigrinus (died 118 AD) was a Roman senator who lived between the 1st and 2nd centuries. Nigrinus served as suffect consul for the nundinium of April to June 110 with Tiberius Julius Aquila Polemaeanus as his colleague.

== Ancestry ==
Nigrinus’ ancestors were Romans of the highest political rank: he was the son of an elder Gaius Avidius Nigrinus, and his uncle was the consul Titus Avidius Quietus. Nigrinus’ family was wealthy, distinguished and well-connected politically in Faventia (modern Faenza, Italy), where he was born and raised. Nigrinus and his family may have been related to Gaius Petronius Pontius Nigrinus, who was consul in the year 37.

His family had strong links to Greece. The father of Nigrinus had served as Proconsul of Achaea during the reign of Emperor Domitian (81-96), as had his paternal uncle. His family was friendly with Pliny the Younger and Plutarch, the latter of whom dedicated ‘On Brotherly Love’ to the elder Nigrinus and Quietus.

== Career ==
The earliest known office Nigrinus held was as plebeian tribune in 105; Ronald Syme raises the possibility that he is the Nigrinus Pliny the Younger praises for his speech indicting Varenus Rufus for corruption during his administration of Bithynia and Pontus. Nigrinus later became proconsular governor of Achaea, although it is unclear during what years this was; this was probably part of Trajan’s attempt to recognize and stabilize the administration of the financially troubled province.

Nigrinus was a trusted lieutenant of the Emperor Trajan. During the year of his consulship, Trajan sent Nigrinus to Delphi, Greece as a member of an advisory council to assist the future historian Arrian in settling boundary disputes. This event is recorded in Delphi, where there are honorific inscriptions dedicated to Nigrinus in Greek and Latin.

Following his consulate, Nigrinus was appointed governor of Dacia; he held this office from 113 until his death.

In 117, Trajan died and he was succeeded by his paternal second cousin Hadrian. In the summer of 118, Nigrinus was executed at Faventia on orders of the Senate. According to the Historia Augusta Nigrinus was one of four senators who plotted to kill Hadrian while he was sacrificing, while adding that Hadrian had intended to make Nigrinus his heir apparent; the other three senators were Aulus Cornelius Palma, Lucius Publilius Celsus, and Lusius Quietus. It is possible that Hadrian could have viewed Nigrinus as a potential threat, given his previous high standing and close relationship with Trajan. Anthony Birley mentions the suggestion that Hadrian may have later felt remorse for this act, thus explaining why Hadrian adopted Nigrinus' son-in-law, Ceionius Commodus (who later, following his adoption of Marcus Aurelius, took the name Lucius Aelius). However, Birley also suggests Hadrian adopted Commodus out of "sheer perversity -- Hadrian's desire to infuriate other aspirants."

== Family ==
Nigrinus is known to have had two wives. The name of his first wife is not known, but their daughter Avidia married Ceionius Commodus; together they had a son, the future Lucius Verus, co-emperor with Marcus Aurelius. His second wife Plautia, had previously been married to Lucius Ceionius Commodus (ordinary consul 106), and after Nigrinus' death married Sextus Vettulenus Civica. Plautia and Nigrinus had a daughter, Avidia Plautia, who had two children, Lucius Titius Plautius Aquilinus (ordinary consul 162) and Plautius Quintillus (ordinary consul 159).

== Nerva–Antonine family tree ==
Nerva–Antonine family tree

Q. Marcius Barea Soranus	Q. Marcius Barea Sura	Antonia Furnilla	M. Cocceius Nerva	Sergia Plautilla	P. Aelius Hadrianus
Titus (r. 79–81)	Marcia Furnilla	Marcia	Trajanus Pater	Nerva (r. 96–98)	Ulpia (Note: Sister of Trajan's father: Giacosa (1977), p. 7.)	Aelius Hadrianus Marullinus
Flavia (Note: Giacosa (1977), p. 8.)	Marciana (Note: Levick (2014), p. 161.)	C. Salonius Matidius (Note: Husband of Ulpia Marciana: Levick (2014), p. 161.)	Trajan (r. 98–117)	Plotina	P. Acilius Attianus	P. Aelius Afer (Note: Giacosa (1977), p. 7.)	Paulina Major (Note: DIR contributor (Herbert W. Benario, 2000), "Hadrian".)
Lucius Mindius (2)	Libo Rupilius Frugi (3)	Salonia Matidia (Note: Giacosa (1977), p. 9.)	L. Vibius Sabinus (1) (Note: Husband of Salonia Matidia: Levick (2014), p. 161.)
Paulina Minor	L. Julius Ursus Servianus (Note: Smith (1870), "Julius Servianus".)
Matidia Minor	Sabina	Hadrian (Note: Smith (1870), "Hadrian", pp. 319–322.) (r. 117–138)	Antinous (Note: Lover of Hadrian: Lambert (1984), p. 99 and passim; deification: Lamber (1984), pp. 2–5, etc.)
C. Fuscus Salinator I	Julia Serviana Paulina
M. Annius Verus (Note: Husband of Rupilia Faustina: Levick (2014), p. 163.)	Rupilia Faustina (Note: Levick (2014), p. 163.) (Note: It is uncertain whether Rupilia Faustina was Frugi's daughter by Salonia Matidia or another woman.)	Boionia Procilla	Cn. Arrius Antoninus
L. Ceionius Commodus	Appia Severa	C. Fuscus Salinator II
L. Caesennius Paetus	Arria Antonina	Arria Fadilla (Note: Levick (2014), p. 162.)	T. Aurelius Fulvus
L. Caesennius Antoninus	L. Commodus	Plautia	unknown (Note: Levick (2014), p. 164.)	C. Avidius Nigrinus
M. Annius Verus	Calvisia Domitia Lucilla (Note: Wife of M. Annius Verus: Giacosa (1977), p. 10.)	Fundania (Note: Wife of M. Annius Libo: Levick (2014), p. 163.)	M. Annius Libo	Faustina	Antoninus Pius (r. 138–161)	L. Aelius Caesar	Avidia
Cornificia	Marcus Aurelius (r. 161–180) (Note: Giacosa (1977), p. 10.)	Faustina Minor	C. Avidius Cassius (Note: The epitomator of Cassius Dio (72.22) gives the story that Faustina the Elder promised to marry Avidius Cassius. This is also echoed in HA "Marcus Aurelius" 24.)	Aurelia Fadilla	Lucius Verus (r. 161–169) (1)	Ceionia Fabia	Plautius Quintillus (Note: Husband of Ceionia Fabia: Levick (2014), p. 164.)	Q. Servilius Pudens	Ceionia Plautia
Cornificia Minor (Note: Levick (2014), p. 117.)	M. Petronius Sura	Commodus (r. 177–192)	Fadilla	M. Annius Verus Caesar	Ti. Claudius Pompeianus (2)	Lucilla	M. Plautius Quintillus	Junius Licinius Balbus	Servilia Ceionia
Petronius Antoninus	L. Aurelius Agaclytus (2)	Aurelia Sabina	L. Antistius Burrus (1)	Plautius Quintillus	Plautia Servilla	C. Furius Sabinus Timesitheus	Maecia Faustina	Junius Licinius Balbus?
Furia Sabinia Tranquillina	Gordian III (r. 238–244)

- (1) = 1st spouse
- (2) = 2nd spouse
- (3) = 3rd spouse
- Reddish-purple indicates emperor of the Nerva–Antonine dynasty
  lighter purple indicates designated imperial heir of said dynasty who never reigned
  grey indicates unsuccessful imperial aspirants
  bluish-purple indicates emperors of other dynasties
- dashed lines indicate adoption; dotted lines indicate love affairs/unmarried relationships
- Small Caps = posthumously deified (Augusti, Augustae, or other)

Notes:

Except where otherwise noted, the notes below indicate that an individual's parentage is as shown in the above family tree.

References:
- DIR contributors (2000). "De Imperatoribus Romanis: An Online Encyclopedia of Roman Rulers and Their Families".
- Giacosa, Giorgio (1977). Women of the Caesars: Their Lives and Portraits on Coins. Translated by R. Ross Holloway. Milan: Edizioni Arte e Moneta. ISBN 0-8390-0193-2.
- Lambert, Royston (1984). Beloved and God: The Story of Hadrian and Antinous. New York: Viking. ISBN 0-670-15708-2.
- Levick, Barbara (2014). Faustina I and II: Imperial Women of the Golden Age. Oxford University Press. ISBN 978-0-19-537941-9.
- Smith, William, ed. (1870). Dictionary of Greek and Roman Biography and Mythology.

== Sources ==
- Matthew Bunson, A dictionary of the Roman Empire 1995
- C. Konrad, Plutarch's Sertorius: A Historical Commentary Chapel Hill: University of North Carolina Press, 1994
- Alan K. Bowman, Peter Garnsey, Dominic Rathbone, The Cambridge ancient history, Volume 11, 2nd Edition 2000
- Anthony Richard Birley, The Roman Government of Britain Oxford, 2005
- Anthony R. Birley, "Hadrian and Greek Senators", Zeitschrift für Papyrologie und Epigraphik, 116 (1997), pp. 209–245
- http://penelope.uchicago.edu/Thayer/E/Roman/Texts/Historia_Augusta/Aelius*.html#2.8
- http://penelope.uchicago.edu/Thayer/E/Roman/Texts/Historia_Augusta/Lucius_Verus*.html

Political offices
Preceded by Marcus Peducaeus Priscinus, and Servius Cornelius Scipio Salvidienus Orfitus as Ordinary consul	Suffect consul of the Roman Empire; 110 with Tiberius Julius Aquila Polemaeanus	Succeeded by Lucius Catilius Severus Julianus Claudius Reginus, and Gaius Erucianus Silo as Suffect consul
