= Marcus Annius Verus Caesar =

Caesar of the Roman Empire (c.162-169)

Annius Verus
- Caesar of the Roman Empire
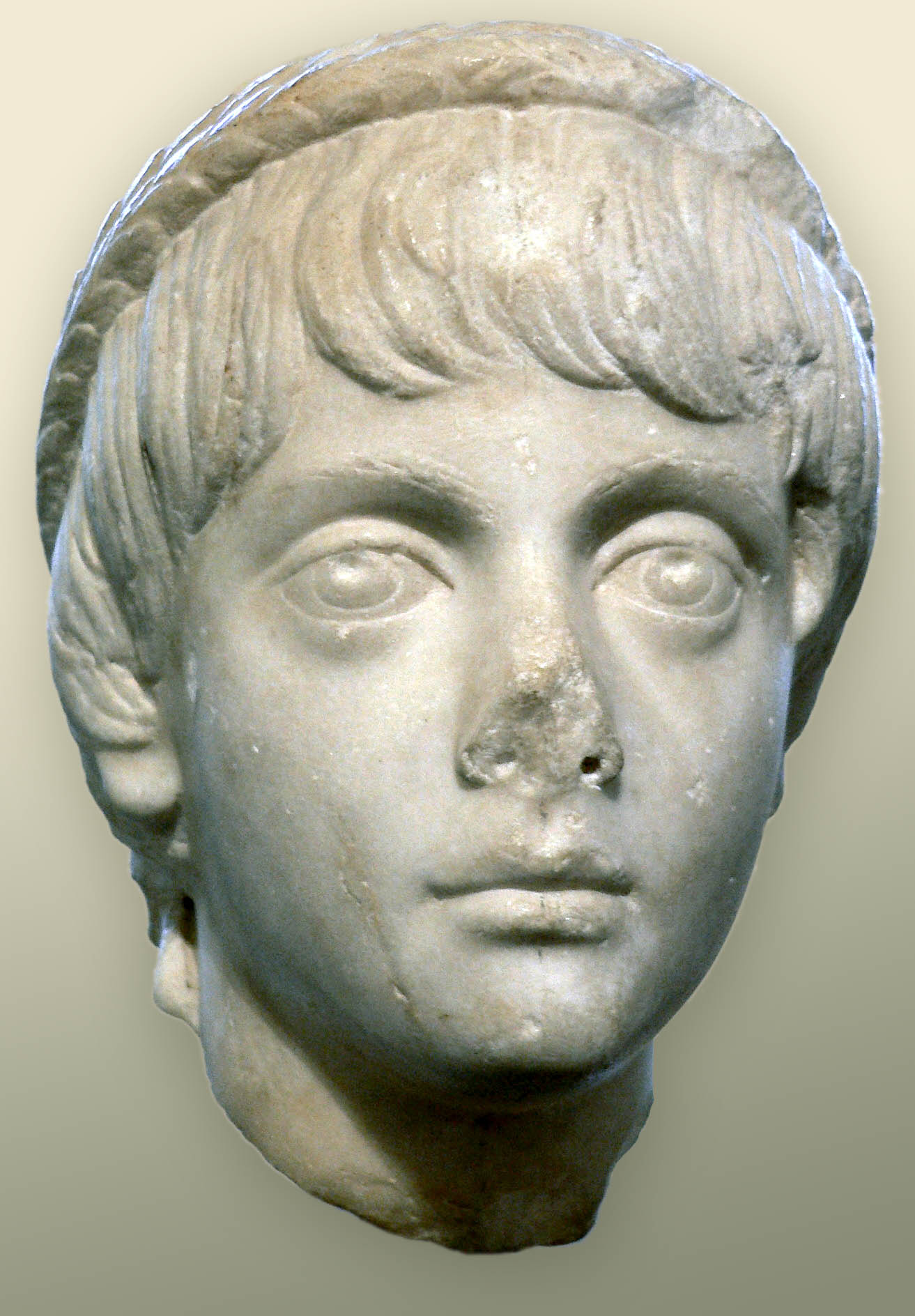
- Possible bust of Annius Verus at the Louvre.
- Caesar: 12 October 166 – 10 September 169
- Born: 162/163
- Died: 10 September 169 (aged 7)
Names
- Marcus Annius Verus
Regnal name
- Marcus Annius Verus Caesar
- Dynasty: Nerva–Antonine
- Father: Marcus Aurelius
- Mother: Faustina the Younger

Marcus Annius Verus Caesar (162 or 163 – 10 September 169) was a son of Roman Emperor Marcus Aurelius and Empress Faustina the Younger. Annius was made caesar on 12 October 166 AD, alongside his brother Commodus, designating them co-heirs of the Roman Empire. Annius died on 10 September 169, at age seven, due to complications from a surgery to remove a tumor from under his ear. His death left Commodus as the sole heir.

== Life ==
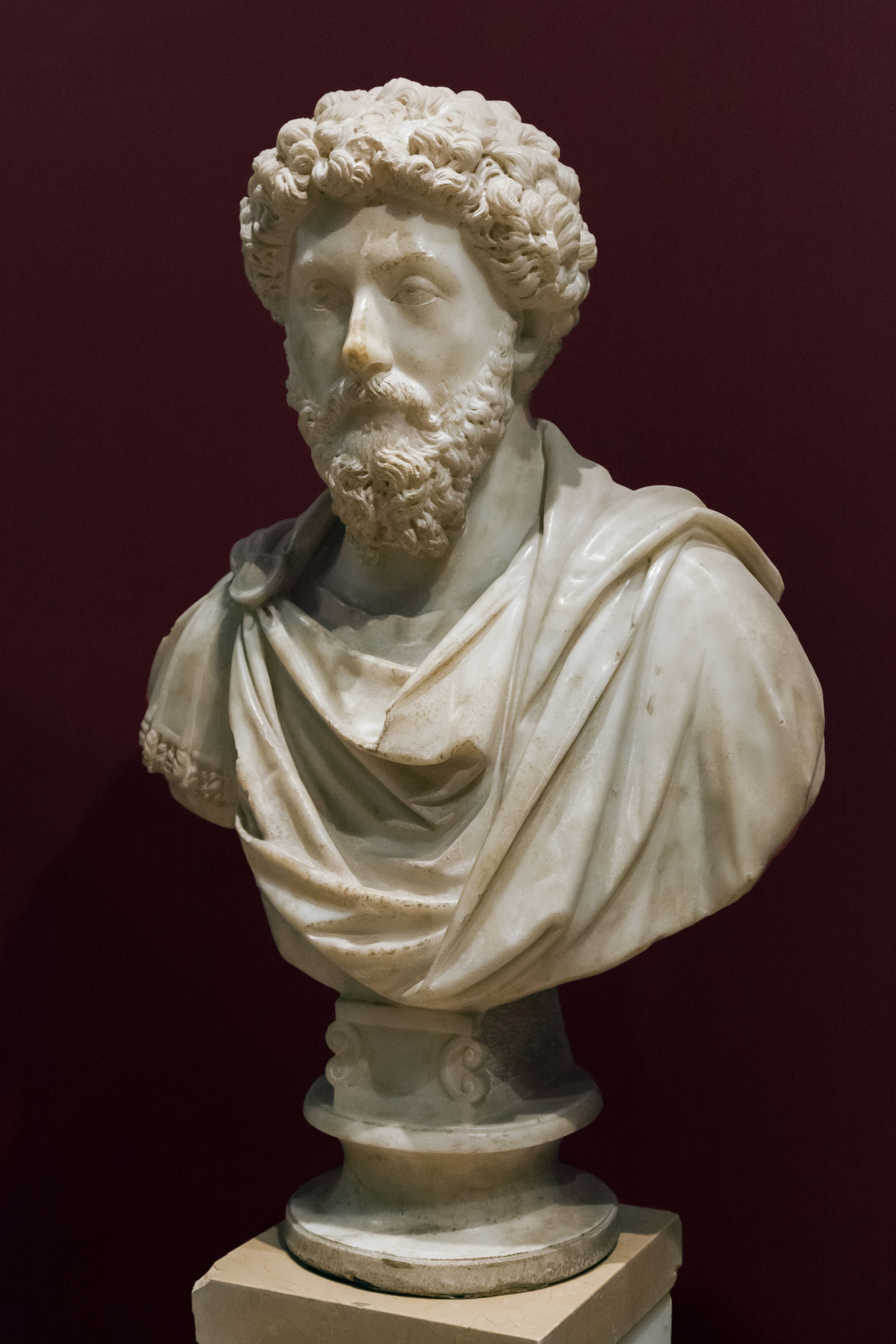
Bust of Marcus Aurelius, Annius' father

Marcus Annius Verus was born in late 162 or 163 AD, the son of Marcus Aurelius and Faustina the Younger. He was given the name of Marcus Annius Verus because it was the original name of his father, Marcus Aurelius.

On 12 October 166 AD, during a triumph celebrating the victory of the Romans in the Parthian War of Lucius Verus, Annius and his elder brother Commodus were both made caesars, designating them as co-heirs to the Roman Empire. At the time, Annius was three, and Commodus was five. This was the first time such an explicit declaration of heirship had been made at such a young age, and showed a marked shift from the traditional cursus honorum, in which a presumed heir would be gradually raised through offices of increasing importance, in order to learn the skills of all positions, to a new system of imperial succession, wherein dynastic hereditary descent was the path to the throne, with heirs being instructed in how to be an emperor.

Annius died on 10 September 169 AD, at seven years of age, due to complications in removing a tumor from under his ear. This left Commodus as the sole heir. His father, Marcus Aurelius, mourned his death for just five days, while still continuing public work. Aurelius argued that because the games of Jupiter Optimus Maximus were ongoing, he should not interrupt them with his mourning. His lack of mourning was likely influenced by his Stoic philosophy, which taught of the dangers of emotion, and Roman cultural norms which treated hysterical grief at the loss of loved ones as unmanly and unnatural. Aurelius ordered statues to be made in his honor, and a golden image of him to be carried during the procession of the games. Aurelius also had his name inserted into the Carmen Saliare, the ritual songs sung by the Salii, a group of 12 priests.

== Family ==
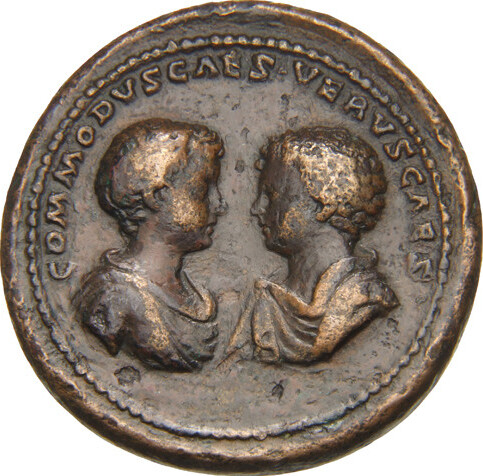
Portrait of Commodus and Annius Verus on a coin of AD 166, marking their announcement as caesars.

Annius Verus was the son of Marcus Aurelius and Faustina the Younger. Annius was the younger brother of, in order of birth: Domitia Faustina, Titus Aurelius Antoninus, Titus Aelius Aurelius, Annia Aurelia Galeria Lucilla, Annia Galeria Aurelia Faustina, Titus Aelius Antoninus, an unnamed son, Annia Aurelia Fadilla, Annia Cornificia Faustina Minor, Titus Aurelius Fulvus Antoninus and Lucius Aurelius Commodus Antoninus (Commodus). Annius was the older brother of Hadrianus and Vibia Aurelia Sabina.

== Nerva–Antonine family tree ==
Nerva–Antonine family tree

Q. Marcius Barea Soranus	Q. Marcius Barea Sura	Antonia Furnilla	M. Cocceius Nerva	Sergia Plautilla	P. Aelius Hadrianus
Titus (r. 79–81)	Marcia Furnilla	Marcia	Trajanus Pater	Nerva (r. 96–98)	Ulpia (Note: Sister of Trajan's father: Giacosa (1977), p. 7.)	Aelius Hadrianus Marullinus
Flavia (Note: Giacosa (1977), p. 8.)	Marciana (Note: Levick (2014), p. 161.)	C. Salonius Matidius (Note: Husband of Ulpia Marciana: Levick (2014), p. 161.)	Trajan (r. 98–117)	Plotina	P. Acilius Attianus	P. Aelius Afer (Note: Giacosa (1977), p. 7.)	Paulina Major (Note: DIR contributor (Herbert W. Benario, 2000), "Hadrian".)
Lucius Mindius (2)	Libo Rupilius Frugi (3)	Salonia Matidia (Note: Giacosa (1977), p. 9.)	L. Vibius Sabinus (1) (Note: Husband of Salonia Matidia: Levick (2014), p. 161.)
Paulina Minor	L. Julius Ursus Servianus (Note: Smith (1870), "Julius Servianus".)
Matidia Minor	Sabina	Hadrian (Note: Smith (1870), "Hadrian", pp. 319–322.) (r. 117–138)	Antinous (Note: Lover of Hadrian: Lambert (1984), p. 99 and passim; deification: Lambert (1984), pp. 2–5, etc.)
C. Fuscus Salinator I	Julia Serviana Paulina
M. Annius Verus (Note: Husband of Rupilia Faustina: Levick (2014), p. 163.)	Rupilia Faustina (Note: Levick (2014), p. 163.) (Note: It is uncertain whether Rupilia Faustina was Frugi's daughter by Salonia Matidia or another woman.)	Boionia Procilla	Cn. Arrius Antoninus
L. Ceionius Commodus	Appia Severa	C. Fuscus Salinator II
L. Caesennius Paetus	Arria Antonina	Arria Fadilla (Note: Levick (2014), p. 162.)	T. Aurelius Fulvus
L. Caesennius Antoninus	L. Commodus	Plautia	unknown (Note: Levick (2014), p. 164.)	C. Avidius Nigrinus
M. Annius Verus	Calvisia Domitia Lucilla (Note: Wife of M. Annius Verus: Giacosa (1977), p. 10.)	Fundania (Note: Wife of M. Annius Libo: Levick (2014), p. 163.)	M. Annius Libo	Faustina	Antoninus Pius (r. 138–161)	L. Aelius Caesar	Avidia
Cornificia	Marcus Aurelius (r. 161–180) (Note: Giacosa (1977), p. 10.)	Faustina Minor	Aurelia Fadilla	Lucius Verus (r. 161–169) (1)	Ceionia Fabia	Plautius Quintillus (Note: Husband of Ceionia Fabia: Levick (2014), p. 164.)	Q. Servilius Pudens	Ceionia Plautia
Cornificia Minor (Note: Levick (2014), p. 117.)	M. Petronius Sura	Commodus (r. 177–192)	Fadilla	M. Annius Verus Caesar	Ti. Claudius Pompeianus (2)	Lucilla	M. Plautius Quintillus	Junius Licinius Balbus	Servilia Ceionia
Petronius Antoninus	L. Aurelius Agaclytus (2)	Aurelia Sabina	L. Antistius Burrus (1)	Plautius Quintillus	Plautia Servilla	C. Furius Sabinus Timesitheus	Maecia Faustina	Junius Licinius Balbus?
Furia Sabinia Tranquillina	Gordian III (r. 238–244)

- (1) = 1st spouse
- (2) = 2nd spouse
- (3) = 3rd spouse
- Reddish-purple indicates emperor of the Nerva–Antonine dynasty
  lighter purple indicates designated imperial heir of said dynasty who never reigned
  grey indicates unsuccessful imperial aspirants
  bluish-purple indicates emperors of other dynasties
- dashed lines indicate adoption; dotted lines indicate love affairs/unmarried relationships
- Small Caps = posthumously deified (Augusti, Augustae, or other)

Notes:

Except where otherwise noted, the notes below indicate that an individual's parentage is as shown in the above family tree.

References:
- DIR contributors (2000). "De Imperatoribus Romanis: An Online Encyclopedia of Roman Rulers and Their Families".
- Giacosa, Giorgio (1977). Women of the Caesars: Their Lives and Portraits on Coins. Translated by Holloway, R. Ross. Milan: Edizioni Arte e Moneta. ISBN 0-8390-0193-2.
- Lambert, Royston (1984). Beloved and God: The Story of Hadrian and Antinous. New York: Viking. ISBN 0-670-15708-2.
- Levick, Barbara (2014). Faustina I and II: Imperial Women of the Golden Age. Oxford University Press. ISBN 978-0-19-537941-9.
- Smith, William, ed. (1870). Dictionary of Greek and Roman Biography and Mythology.
