= Lucius Antistius Burrus =

2nd century Roman senator and consul

Lucius Antistius Burrus Adventus (c. 149–188 AD) was a Roman senator who lived in the 2nd century. He was one of the sons-in-law of the Emperor Marcus Aurelius and Faustina the Younger.

Burrus originally came from a senatorial family from Thibilis, a town near Hippo Regius in the Africa Province. Although Burrus was born and raised in Thibilis, his family was not of very ancient lineage. He was the son of Quintus Antistius Adventus Aquilinus Postumus and Novia Crispina. His mother is known from an honorific inscription dedicated to her, dating from her husband's governorship of Arabia Petraea.

Quintus Antistius Adventus (born around mid-120s), during the rule of the Nerva–Antonine dynasty, served as a successful military tribune, legatus, quaestor, public construction official and governor in various provinces throughout the Roman Empire.

Sometime before the death of Marcus Aurelius, Burrus married the Emperor's youngest daughter, Vibia Aurelia Sabina, after which they returned to and settled in Thibilis. When Marcus Aurelius died in 180, Aurelia Sabina's brother Commodus succeeded her father as Emperor. In 181, Burrus served as an ordinary consul.

In 188, Antistius Burrus was involved in a conspiracy against Commodus. When this conspiracy was uncovered, Antistius Burrus was put to death. His widow later remarried; it appears she had no children by Burrus.

== Nerva–Antonine family tree ==
Nerva–Antonine family tree

Q. Marcius Barea Soranus	Q. Marcius Barea Sura	Antonia Furnilla	M. Cocceius Nerva	Sergia Plautilla	P. Aelius Hadrianus
Titus (r. 79–81)	Marcia Furnilla	Marcia	Trajanus Pater	Nerva (r. 96–98)	Ulpia (Note: Sister of Trajan's father: Giacosa (1977), p. 7.)	Aelius Hadrianus Marullinus
Flavia (Note: Giacosa (1977), p. 8.)	Marciana (Note: Levick (2014), p. 161.)	C. Salonius Matidius (Note: Husband of Ulpia Marciana: Levick (2014), p. 161.)	Trajan (r. 98–117)	Plotina	P. Acilius Attianus	P. Aelius Afer (Note: Giacosa (1977), p. 7.)	Paulina Major (Note: DIR contributor (Herbert W. Benario, 2000), "Hadrian".)
Lucius Mindius (2)	Libo Rupilius Frugi (3)	Salonia Matidia (Note: Giacosa (1977), p. 9.)	L. Vibius Sabinus (1) (Note: Husband of Salonia Matidia: Levick (2014), p. 161.)
Paulina Minor	L. Julius Ursus Servianus (Note: Smith (1870), "Julius Servianus".)
Matidia Minor	Sabina	Hadrian (Note: Smith (1870), "Hadrian", pp. 319–322.) (r. 117–138)	Antinous (Note: Lover of Hadrian: Lambert (1984), p. 99 and passim; deification: Lamber (1984), pp. 2–5, etc.)
C. Fuscus Salinator I	Julia Serviana Paulina
M. Annius Verus (Note: Husband of Rupilia Faustina: Levick (2014), p. 163.)	Rupilia Faustina (Note: Levick (2014), p. 163.) (Note: It is uncertain whether Rupilia Faustina was Frugi's daughter by Salonia Matidia or another woman.)	Boionia Procilla	Cn. Arrius Antoninus
L. Ceionius Commodus	Appia Severa	C. Fuscus Salinator II
L. Caesennius Paetus	Arria Antonina	Arria Fadilla (Note: Levick (2014), p. 162.)	T. Aurelius Fulvus
L. Caesennius Antoninus	L. Commodus	Plautia	unknown (Note: Levick (2014), p. 164.)	C. Avidius Nigrinus
M. Annius Verus	Calvisia Domitia Lucilla (Note: Wife of M. Annius Verus: Giacosa (1977), p. 10.)	Fundania (Note: Wife of M. Annius Libo: Levick (2014), p. 163.)	M. Annius Libo	Faustina	Antoninus Pius (r. 138–161)	L. Aelius Caesar	Avidia
Cornificia	Marcus Aurelius (r. 161–180) (Note: Giacosa (1977), p. 10.)	Faustina Minor	C. Avidius Cassius (Note: The epitomator of Cassius Dio (72.22) gives the story that Faustina the Elder promised to marry Avidius Cassius. This is also echoed in HA "Marcus Aurelius" 24.)	Aurelia Fadilla	Lucius Verus (r. 161–169) (1)	Ceionia Fabia	Plautius Quintillus (Note: Husband of Ceionia Fabia: Levick (2014), p. 164.)	Q. Servilius Pudens	Ceionia Plautia
Cornificia Minor (Note: Levick (2014), p. 117.)	M. Petronius Sura	Commodus (r. 177–192)	Fadilla	M. Annius Verus Caesar	Ti. Claudius Pompeianus (2)	Lucilla	M. Plautius Quintillus	Junius Licinius Balbus	Servilia Ceionia
Petronius Antoninus	L. Aurelius Agaclytus (2)	Aurelia Sabina	L. Antistius Burrus (1)	Plautius Quintillus	Plautia Servilla	C. Furius Sabinus Timesitheus	Maecia Faustina	Junius Licinius Balbus?
Furia Sabina Tranquillina	Gordian III (r. 238–244)

- (1) = 1st spouse
- (2) = 2nd spouse
- (3) = 3rd spouse
- Reddish-purple indicates emperor of the Nerva–Antonine dynasty
  lighter purple indicates designated imperial heir of said dynasty who never reigned
  grey indicates unsuccessful imperial aspirants
  bluish-purple indicates emperors of other dynasties
- dashed lines indicate adoption; dotted lines indicate love affairs/unmarried relationships
- Small Caps = posthumously deified (Augusti, Augustae, or other)

Notes:

Except where otherwise noted, the notes below indicate that an individual's parentage is as shown in the above family tree.

References:
- DIR contributors (2000). "De Imperatoribus Romanis: An Online Encyclopedia of Roman Rulers and Their Families".
- Giacosa, Giorgio (1977). Women of the Caesars: Their Lives and Portraits on Coins. Translated by R. Ross Holloway. Milan: Edizioni Arte e Moneta. ISBN 0-8390-0193-2.
- Lambert, Royston (1984). Beloved and God: The Story of Hadrian and Antinous. New York: Viking. ISBN 0-670-15708-2.
- Levick, Barbara (2014). Faustina I and II: Imperial Women of the Golden Age. Oxford University Press. ISBN 978-0-19-537941-9.
- Smith, William, ed. (1870). Dictionary of Greek and Roman Biography and Mythology.

== Sources ==
- Albino Garzetti, From Tiberius to the Antonines: a history of the Roman Empire AD 14-192, 1974
- Anthony R. Birley, The Roman Government of Britain, Oxford University Press, 2005
- Anthony R. Birley, Marcus Aurelius, Routledge, 2000
- https://scholarsbank.uoregon.edu/xmlui/bitstream/handle/1794/4969/latin_literature.pdf?sequence=1
- http://thecorner.wordpress.com/2006/06/21/chapter-two-septimius-and-the-cursus-honorum/

Political offices
Preceded by Gaius Bruttius Praesens II; Sextus Quintilius Condianus	Roman consul 181 with Commodus III	Succeeded by Marcus Petronius Sura Mamertinus; Quintus Tineius Rufus
