= Marcus Annius Libo =

2nd-century Roman senator and uncle of Marcus Aurelius

Marcus Annius Libo was a Roman Senator active in the early second century AD.

== Life ==
Libo came from the upper ranks of the Roman aristocracy. He was the son of Marcus Annius Verus, consul III in 126, and Rupilia Faustina. Annius Verus was Spanish of Roman descent. Rupilia was the daughter of Lucius Scribonius Libo Rupilius Frugi Bonus and Vitellia (daughter of emperor Vitellius). Libo is known to have had three siblings, two sisters and one brother. His elder sister was the Empress Faustina the Elder (mother of the Empress Faustina the Younger) and his younger sister (whose name is missing, but surmised to be Annia) was the wife of Gaius Ummidius Quadratus Sertorius Severus, suffect consul in 118. His brother was Marcus Annius Verus, the father of Marcus Aurelius.

He was consul in 128 as the colleague of Lucius Nonius Calpurnius Torquatus Asprenas. Libo was the paternal uncle of the Emperor Marcus Aurelius.

Beyond his consulship, almost nothing is known of his senatorial career. During the reign of his brother-in-law, Antoninus Pius, he was one of seven witnesses to a Senatus consultum issued to the city of Cyzicus in 138, which sought approval for establishing a corpus juvenum for the education of young men.

== Family ==
Libo married a noblewoman whose name has been surmised as Fundania, daughter of Lucius Fundanius Lamia Aelianus, consul in 116, and wife Rupilia Annia. They are known to have together two children:

- Marcus Annius Libo, suffect consul in 161. He is known to have a son, Marcus Annius Sabinus Libo, and through him a grandson, Marcus Annius Flavius Libo.
- Annia Fundania Faustina, wife of Titus Pomponius Proculus Vitrasius Pollio, consul II in 176.

== Nerva–Antonine family tree ==
Nerva–Antonine family tree

Q. Marcius Barea Soranus | Q. Marcius Barea Sura | Antonia Furnilla | M. Cocceius Nerva | Sergia Plautilla | P. Aelius Hadrianus
Titus (r. 79–81) | Marcia Furnilla | Marcia | Trajanus Pater | Nerva (r. 96–98) | Ulpia (Note: Sister of Trajan's father: Giacosa (1977), p. 7.) | Aelius Hadrianus Marullinus
Flavia (Note: Giacosa (1977), p. 8.) | Marciana (Note: Levick (2014), p. 161.) | C. Salonius Matidius (Note: Husband of Ulpia Marciana: Levick (2014), p. 161.) | Trajan (r. 98–117) | Plotina | P. Acilius Attianus | P. Aelius Afer (Note: Giacosa (1977), p. 7.) | Paulina Major (Note: DIR contributor (Herbert W. Benario, 2000), "Hadrian".)
Lucius Mindius (2) | Libo Rupilius Frugi (3) | Salonia Matidia (Note: Giacosa (1977), p. 9.) | L. Vibius Sabinus (1) (Note: Husband of Salonia Matidia: Levick (2014), p. 161.)
Paulina Minor | L. Julius Ursus Servianus (Note: Smith (1870), "Julius Servianus".)
Matidia Minor | Sabina | Hadrian (Note: Smith (1870), "Hadrian", pp. 319–322.) (r. 117–138) | Antinous (Note: Lover of Hadrian: Lambert (1984), p. 99 and passim; deification: Lamber (1984), pp. 2–5, etc.)
C. Fuscus Salinator I | Julia Serviana Paulina
M. Annius Verus (Note: Husband of Rupilia Faustina: Levick (2014), p. 163.) | Rupilia Faustina (Note: Levick (2014), p. 163.) (Note: It is uncertain whether Rupilia Faustina was Frugi's daughter by Salonia Matidia or another woman.) | Boionia Procilla | Cn. Arrius Antoninus
L. Ceionius Commodus | Appia Severa | C. Fuscus Salinator II
L. Caesennius Paetus | Arria Antonina | Arria Fadilla (Note: Levick (2014), p. 162.) | T. Aurelius Fulvus
L. Caesennius Antoninus | L. Commodus | Plautia | unknown (Note: Levick (2014), p. 164.) | C. Avidius Nigrinus
M. Annius Verus | Calvisia Domitia Lucilla (Note: Wife of M. Annius Verus: Giacosa (1977), p. 10.) | Fundania (Note: Wife of M. Annius Libo: Levick (2014), p. 163.) | M. Annius Libo | Faustina | Antoninus Pius (r. 138–161) | L. Aelius Caesar | Avidia
Cornificia | Marcus Aurelius (r. 161–180) (Note: Giacosa (1977), p. 10.) | Faustina Minor | C. Avidius Cassius (Note: The epitomator of Cassius Dio (72.22) gives the story that Faustina the Elder promised to marry Avidius Cassius. This is also echoed in HA "Marcus Aurelius" 24.) | Aurelia Fadilla | Lucius Verus (r. 161–169) (1) | Ceionia Fabia | Plautius Quintillus (Note: Husband of Ceionia Fabia: Levick (2014), p. 164.) | Q. Servilius Pudens | Ceionia Plautia
Cornificia Minor (Note: Levick (2014), p. 117.) | M. Petronius Sura | Commodus (r. 177–192) | Fadilla | M. Annius Verus Caesar | Ti. Claudius Pompeianus (2) | Lucilla | M. Plautius Quintillus | Junius Licinius Balbus | Servilia Ceionia
Petronius Antoninus | L. Aurelius Agaclytus (2) | Aurelia Sabina | L. Antistius Burrus (1) | Plautius Quintillus | Plautia Servilla | C. Furius Sabinus Timesitheus | Maecia Faustina | Junius Licinius Balbus?
Furia Sabinia Tranquillina | Gordian III (r. 238–244)

- (1) = 1st spouse
- (2) = 2nd spouse
- (3) = 3rd spouse
- Reddish-purple indicates emperor of the Nerva–Antonine dynasty
  lighter purple indicates designated imperial heir of said dynasty who never reigned
  grey indicates unsuccessful imperial aspirants
  bluish-purple indicates emperors of other dynasties
- dashed lines indicate adoption; dotted lines indicate love affairs/unmarried relationships
- Small Caps = posthumously deified (Augusti, Augustae, or other)

Notes:

Except where otherwise noted, the notes below indicate that an individual's parentage is as shown in the above family tree.

References:
- DIR contributors (2000). "De Imperatoribus Romanis: An Online Encyclopedia of Roman Rulers and Their Families".
- Giacosa, Giorgio (1977). Women of the Caesars: Their Lives and Portraits on Coins. Translated by R. Ross Holloway. Milan: Edizioni Arte e Moneta. ISBN 0-8390-0193-2.
- Lambert, Royston (1984). Beloved and God: The Story of Hadrian and Antinous. New York: Viking. ISBN 0-670-15708-2.
- Levick, Barbara (2014). Faustina I and II: Imperial Women of the Golden Age. Oxford University Press. ISBN 978-0-19-537941-9.
- Smith, William, ed. (1870). Dictionary of Greek and Roman Biography and Mythology.

== Sources ==
Political offices
| Preceded by Lucius Aemilius Juncus, and Sextus Julius Severus as suffect consuls | Consul of the Roman Empire; 128 with Lucius Nonius Calpurnius Torquatus Asprenas, followed by Lucius Caesennius Antoninus | Succeeded by Marcus Junius Mettius Rufus, and Quintus Pomponius Maternus as suffect consuls |
