= Marcus Peducaeus Plautius Quintillus =

Roman noble and consul (died 205)

Marcus Peducaeus Plautius Quintillus (died 205) was a Roman noble closely related by birth, adoption, and marriage to the Nerva-Antonine emperors. Through his marriage to Fadilla, the daughter of Emperor Marcus Aurelius and Empress Faustina the Younger, he became the brother-in-law to the future emperor, Commodus. Despite his position, he never became emperor himself. After Commodus was assassinated in 192, he fell out of favor with Septimius Severus during the Year of the Five Emperors. In 205, he killed himself after Septimus issued an order for his execution.

== Early life ==
Plautius was the son of Ceionia Fabia, the daughter of Lucius Aelius, the first adoptive heir of Hadrian who had died before ascending to the throne; his birth father is believed to be Plautius Quintillus, consul in 159. At some point, he was adopted as the heir of Marcus Peducaeus Stloga Priscinus, consul in 141. Through his adopted father, as well as his natural father and mother, he could claim descent from families of the highest nobility.

== Antonine era ==
When Plautius married Annia Aurelia Fadilla, he became son-in-law to Marcus Aurelius and brother-in-law to Commodus. They had two children: a son, (Plautius) Quintillus, and a daughter, Plautia Servilla. In 177, Plautius served as ordinary consul as the colleague of Commodus, and then again with Commodus at an unknown date in his reign (180-192). Plautius was also an Augur. When Marcus Aurelius died in 180, Commodus succeeded him, and Plautius was one of his main advisers.

== Year of the Five Emperors ==
After the assassination of Commodus, in December 192, the civil war that ensued saw five different men assume the throne; Plautius was not one of them. When Septimius Severus, the victor of the civil war, advanced on Rome, Didius Julianus proposed that the Senate and the Vestal Virgins meet Severus' advancing army as supplicants, a proposal Plautius intervened forcefully against.

Plautius afterwards retired to his country villa. In 205, he was the target of a delator or informer, and Septimus ordered his execution. When he heard of the order, Plautius called for his funeral shroud. "What is this?" Plautius asked, observing how tattered it had become with age, "we are late!" Then preparing to take his own life, he burned incense before uttering his last words: "I make the same prayer that Servianus made for Hadrian" — that is, that Severus would one day wish to die, but would be unable to. It is unknown whether Fadilla was still alive then.

== Nerva–Antonine family tree ==
Nerva–Antonine family tree

Q. Marcius Barea Soranus	Q. Marcius Barea Sura	Antonia Furnilla	M. Cocceius Nerva	Sergia Plautilla	P. Aelius Hadrianus
Titus (r. 79–81)	Marcia Furnilla	Marcia	Trajanus Pater	Nerva (r. 96–98)	Ulpia (Note: Sister of Trajan's father: Giacosa (1977), p. 7.)	Aelius Hadrianus Marullinus
Flavia (Note: Giacosa (1977), p. 8.)	Marciana (Note: Levick (2014), p. 161.)	C. Salonius Matidius (Note: Husband of Ulpia Marciana: Levick (2014), p. 161.)	Trajan (r. 98–117)	Plotina	P. Acilius Attianus	P. Aelius Afer (Note: Giacosa (1977), p. 7.)	Paulina Major (Note: DIR contributor (Herbert W. Benario, 2000), "Hadrian".)
Lucius Mindius (2)	Libo Rupilius Frugi (3)	Salonia Matidia (Note: Giacosa (1977), p. 9.)	L. Vibius Sabinus (1) (Note: Husband of Salonia Matidia: Levick (2014), p. 161.)
Paulina Minor	L. Julius Ursus Servianus (Note: Smith (1870), "Julius Servianus".)
Matidia Minor	Sabina	Hadrian (Note: Smith (1870), "Hadrian", pp. 319–322.) (r. 117–138)	Antinous (Note: Lover of Hadrian: Lambert (1984), p. 99 and passim; deification: Lamber (1984), pp. 2–5, etc.)
C. Fuscus Salinator I	Julia Serviana Paulina
M. Annius Verus (Note: Husband of Rupilia Faustina: Levick (2014), p. 163.)	Rupilia Faustina (Note: Levick (2014), p. 163.) (Note: It is uncertain whether Rupilia Faustina was Frugi's daughter by Salonia Matidia or another woman.)	Boionia Procilla	Cn. Arrius Antoninus
L. Ceionius Commodus	Appia Severa	C. Fuscus Salinator II
L. Caesennius Paetus	Arria Antonina	Arria Fadilla (Note: Levick (2014), p. 162.)	T. Aurelius Fulvus
L. Caesennius Antoninus	L. Commodus	Plautia	unknown (Note: Levick (2014), p. 164.)	C. Avidius Nigrinus
M. Annius Verus	Calvisia Domitia Lucilla (Note: Wife of M. Annius Verus: Giacosa (1977), p. 10.)	Fundania (Note: Wife of M. Annius Libo: Levick (2014), p. 163.)	M. Annius Libo	Faustina	Antoninus Pius (r. 138–161)	L. Aelius Caesar	Avidia
Cornificia	Marcus Aurelius (r. 161–180) (Note: Giacosa (1977), p. 10.)	Faustina Minor	C. Avidius Cassius (Note: The epitomator of Cassius Dio (72.22) gives the story that Faustina the Elder promised to marry Avidius Cassius. This is also echoed in HA "Marcus Aurelius" 24.)	Aurelia Fadilla	Lucius Verus (r. 161–169) (1)	Ceionia Fabia	Plautius Quintillus (Note: Husband of Ceionia Fabia: Levick (2014), p. 164.)	Q. Servilius Pudens	Ceionia Plautia
Cornificia Minor (Note: Levick (2014), p. 117.)	M. Petronius Sura	Commodus (r. 177–192)	Fadilla	M. Annius Verus Caesar	Ti. Claudius Pompeianus (2)	Lucilla	M. Plautius Quintillus	Junius Licinius Balbus	Servilia Ceionia
Petronius Antoninus	L. Aurelius Agaclytus (2)	Aurelia Sabina	L. Antistius Burrus (1)	Plautius Quintillus	Plautia Servilla	C. Furius Sabinus Timesitheus	Maecia Faustina	Junius Licinius Balbus?
Furia Sabinia Tranquillina	Gordian III (r. 238–244)

- (1) = 1st spouse
- (2) = 2nd spouse
- (3) = 3rd spouse
- Reddish-purple indicates emperor of the Nerva–Antonine dynasty
  lighter purple indicates designated imperial heir of said dynasty who never reigned
  grey indicates unsuccessful imperial aspirants
  bluish-purple indicates emperors of other dynasties
- dashed lines indicate adoption; dotted lines indicate love affairs/unmarried relationships
- Small Caps = posthumously deified (Augusti, Augustae, or other)

Notes:

Except where otherwise noted, the notes below indicate that an individual's parentage is as shown in the above family tree.

References:
- DIR contributors (2000). "De Imperatoribus Romanis: An Online Encyclopedia of Roman Rulers and Their Families".
- Giacosa, Giorgio (1977). Women of the Caesars: Their Lives and Portraits on Coins. Translated by R. Ross Holloway. Milan: Edizioni Arte e Moneta. ISBN 0-8390-0193-2.
- Lambert, Royston (1984). Beloved and God: The Story of Hadrian and Antinous. New York: Viking. ISBN 0-670-15708-2.
- Levick, Barbara (2014). Faustina I and II: Imperial Women of the Golden Age. Oxford University Press. ISBN 978-0-19-537941-9.
- Smith, William, ed. (1870). Dictionary of Greek and Roman Biography and Mythology.

== Sources ==
- Albino Garzetti, From Tiberius to the Antonines: a history of the Roman Empire AD 14-192 (1974)
- Alan K. Bowman, Peter Garnsey, Dominic Rathbone, The Cambridge ancient history, Volume 11, second edition (2000)
- Livius article on Fadilla

Political offices
Preceded by Titus Pomponius Proculus Vitrasius Pollio II; Marcus Flavius Aper II	Consul of the Roman Empire; 177 with Commodus	Succeeded by Servius Cornelius Scipio Salvidienus Orfitus; Decimus Velius Rufus
