= Domitia Lucilla (mother of Marcus Aurelius) =

Mother of Roman emperor Marcus Aurelius

- Calvisia Domitia P. f. Lucilla
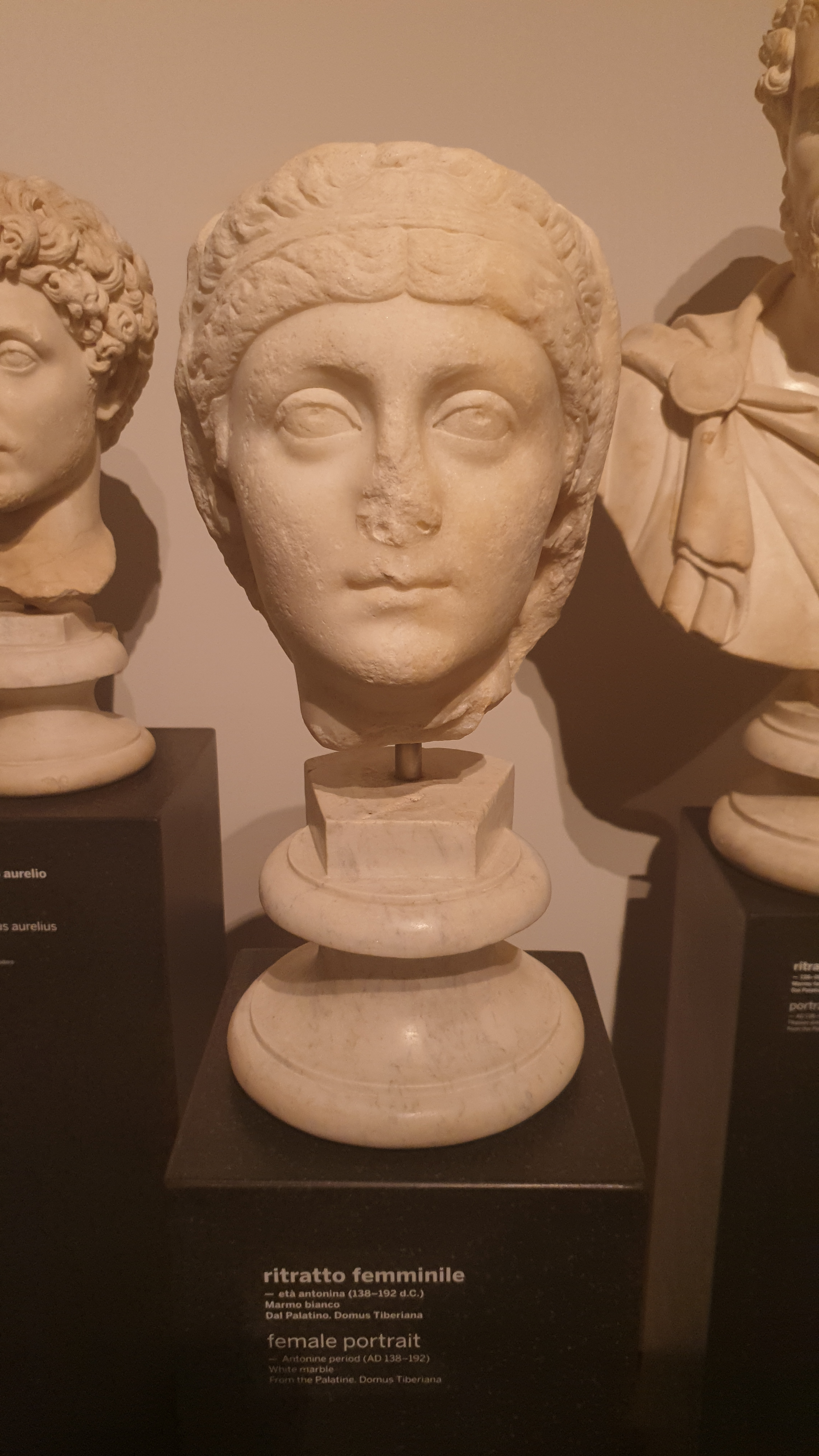
- Portrait from the Domus Tiberiana identified as Lucilla
- Other names: Lucilla; Domitia Lucilla Minor; Domitia Calvilla
- Known for: mother of emperor Marcus Aurelius
- Children: Marcus Aurelius; Annia Cornificia Faustina
- Parents: Publius Calvisius Tullus Ruso (father); Domitia Lucilla (mother)
- Relatives: Nerva–Antonine dynasty
- Family: Calvisii Rusones

Calvisia Domitia Lucilla (also known as Domitia Lucilla Minor and Domitia Calvilla, d. 155–161), was a noble Roman woman who lived in the 2nd century. She is best known as the mother of the Roman Emperor Marcus Aurelius.

== Descent ==
Lucilla was the daughter of Domitia Lucilla Maior (Maior is Latin for the Elder) and the patrician Publius Calvisius Tullus Ruso. Her biological maternal grandfather was Gnaeus Domitius Lucanus, adoptive maternal grandfather was Gnaeus Domitius Tullus and maternal step-grandfather was Lucius Catilius Severus. Lucilla's father served as consul in 109 and the date of his second consulship is unknown.

Lucilla through her mother had inherited a great fortune, which included a tile and brick factory near Rome, close to the river Tiber. The factory provided bricks to some of Rome's most famous monuments including the Colosseum, Pantheon and the Market of Trajan, and exported bricks to France, Spain, North Africa and all over the Mediterranean. The factory, or part of it, has been excavated at Bomarzo, 40 miles north of Rome.

== Marriage ==
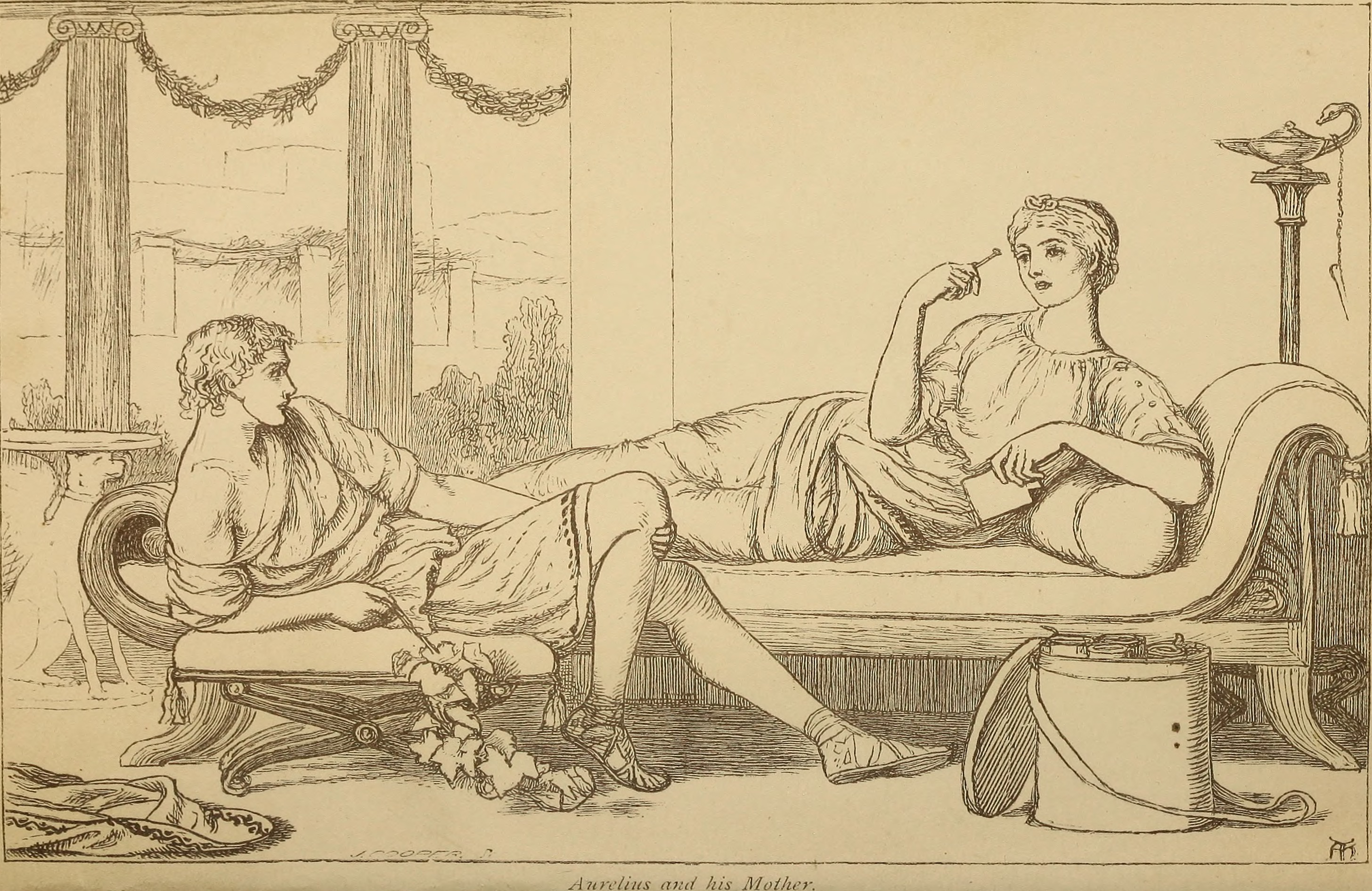
Arthur Hughes Aurelius and his mother (1868)

Lucilla married Marcus Annius Verus, a praetor, who came from a wealthy senatorial family. Verus' sister Faustina the Elder was a Roman Empress and married the Roman Emperor Antoninus Pius. Verus was a nephew to Roman Empress Vibia Sabina and his maternal grandmother was Salonia Matidia (niece of Roman Emperor Trajan). With Verus, she had two children, a son, the future Roman Emperor Marcus Aurelius (26 April 121) and a daughter Annia Cornificia Faustina (122/123 – between 152 and 158).

== Widowhood ==
In 124, her husband died. Her children were raised by herself, and they were adopted by her father-in-law. Marcus Aurelius would later inherit the tile and brick factory.

In Lucilla's household, the future Roman Emperor Didius Julianus was educated and through her support he was able to start his legal career. Lucilla was a lady of considerable wealth and influence. In his Meditations, Marcus Aurelius describes her as a 'pious and generous' person who lived a simple life (1.3n). She spent her final years living with her son in Rome.

== Nerva–Antonine family tree ==
Nerva–Antonine family tree

Q. Marcius Barea Soranus	Q. Marcius Barea Sura	Antonia Furnilla	M. Cocceius Nerva	Sergia Plautilla	P. Aelius Hadrianus
Titus (r. 79–81)	Marcia Furnilla	Marcia	Trajanus Pater	Nerva (r. 96–98)	Ulpia (Note: Sister of Trajan's father: Giacosa (1977), p. 7.)	Aelius Hadrianus Marullinus
Flavia (Note: Giacosa (1977), p. 8.)	Marciana (Note: Levick (2014), p. 161.)	C. Salonius Matidius (Note: Husband of Ulpia Marciana: Levick (2014), p. 161.)	Trajan (r. 98–117)	Plotina	P. Acilius Attianus	P. Aelius Afer (Note: Giacosa (1977), p. 7.)	Paulina Major (Note: DIR contributor (Herbert W. Benario, 2000), "Hadrian".)
Lucius Mindius (2)	Libo Rupilius Frugi (3)	Salonia Matidia (Note: Giacosa (1977), p. 9.)	L. Vibius Sabinus (1) (Note: Husband of Salonia Matidia: Levick (2014), p. 161.)
Paulina Minor	L. Julius Ursus Servianus (Note: Smith (1870), "Julius Servianus".)
Matidia Minor	Sabina	Hadrian (Note: Smith (1870), "Hadrian", pp. 319–322.) (r. 117–138)	Antinous (Note: Lover of Hadrian: Lambert (1984), p. 99 and passim; deification: Lamber (1984), pp. 2–5, etc.)
C. Fuscus Salinator I	Julia Serviana Paulina
M. Annius Verus (Note: Husband of Rupilia Faustina: Levick (2014), p. 163.)	Rupilia Faustina (Note: Levick (2014), p. 163.) (Note: It is uncertain whether Rupilia Faustina was Frugi's daughter by Salonia Matidia or another woman.)	Boionia Procilla	Cn. Arrius Antoninus
L. Ceionius Commodus	Appia Severa	C. Fuscus Salinator II
L. Caesennius Paetus	Arria Antonina	Arria Fadilla (Note: Levick (2014), p. 162.)	T. Aurelius Fulvus
L. Caesennius Antoninus	L. Commodus	Plautia	unknown (Note: Levick (2014), p. 164.)	C. Avidius Nigrinus
M. Annius Verus	Calvisia Domitia Lucilla (Note: Wife of M. Annius Verus: Giacosa (1977), p. 10.)	Fundania (Note: Wife of M. Annius Libo: Levick (2014), p. 163.)	M. Annius Libo	Faustina	Antoninus Pius (r. 138–161)	L. Aelius Caesar	Avidia
Cornificia	Marcus Aurelius (r. 161–180) (Note: Giacosa (1977), p. 10.)	Faustina Minor	C. Avidius Cassius (Note: The epitomator of Cassius Dio (72.22) gives the story that Faustina the Elder promised to marry Avidius Cassius. This is also echoed in HA "Marcus Aurelius" 24.)	Aurelia Fadilla	Lucius Verus (r. 161–169) (1)	Ceionia Fabia	Plautius Quintillus (Note: Husband of Ceionia Fabia: Levick (2014), p. 164.)	Q. Servilius Pudens	Ceionia Plautia
Cornificia Minor (Note: Levick (2014), p. 117.)	M. Petronius Sura	Commodus (r. 177–192)	Fadilla	M. Annius Verus Caesar	Ti. Claudius Pompeianus (2)	Lucilla	M. Plautius Quintillus	Junius Licinius Balbus	Servilia Ceionia
Petronius Antoninus	L. Aurelius Agaclytus (2)	Aurelia Sabina	L. Antistius Burrus (1)	Plautius Quintillus	Plautia Servilla	C. Furius Sabinus Timesitheus	Maecia Faustina	Junius Licinius Balbus?
Furia Sabinia Tranquillina	Gordian III (r. 238–244)

- (1) = 1st spouse
- (2) = 2nd spouse
- (3) = 3rd spouse
- Reddish-purple indicates emperor of the Nerva–Antonine dynasty
  lighter purple indicates designated imperial heir of said dynasty who never reigned
  grey indicates unsuccessful imperial aspirants
  bluish-purple indicates emperors of other dynasties
- dashed lines indicate adoption; dotted lines indicate love affairs/unmarried relationships
- Small Caps = posthumously deified (Augusti, Augustae, or other)

Notes:

Except where otherwise noted, the notes below indicate that an individual's parentage is as shown in the above family tree.

References:
- DIR contributors (2000). "De Imperatoribus Romanis: An Online Encyclopedia of Roman Rulers and Their Families".
- Giacosa, Giorgio (1977). Women of the Caesars: Their Lives and Portraits on Coins. Translated by R. Ross Holloway. Milan: Edizioni Arte e Moneta. ISBN 0-8390-0193-2.
- Lambert, Royston (1984). Beloved and God: The Story of Hadrian and Antinous. New York: Viking. ISBN 0-670-15708-2.
- Levick, Barbara (2014). Faustina I and II: Imperial Women of the Golden Age. Oxford University Press. ISBN 978-0-19-537941-9.
- Smith, William, ed. (1870). Dictionary of Greek and Roman Biography and Mythology.

== See also ==
- Calvisia gens
