= Tranquillina =

Consort to Roman Emperor Gordian III (born c.225)

Furia Sabinia Tranquillina
- Augusta
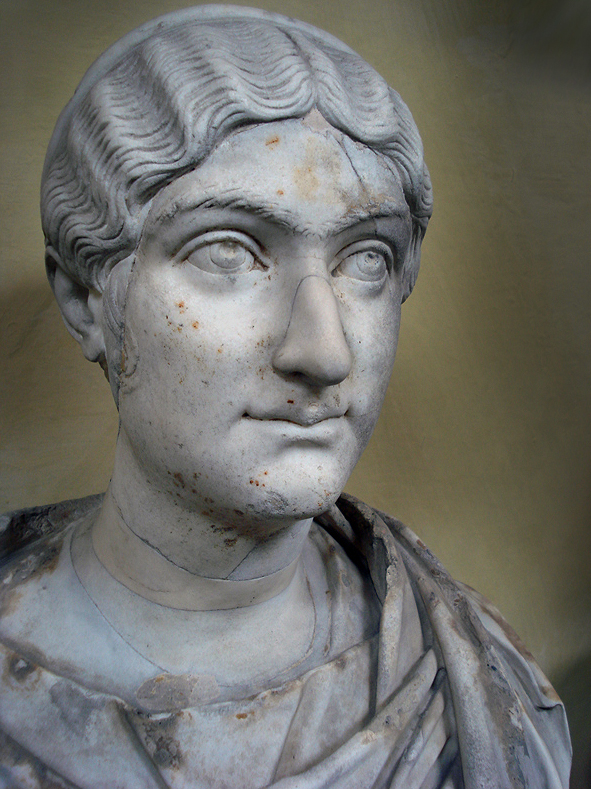
- Marble of Furia Sabinia Tranquillina at Museo Chiaramonti

Empress of the Roman Empire
- Tenure: 241–244 AD
- Born: c. 225 AD
- Died: aft. 244 AD
- Spouse: Gordian III
Names
- Furia Sabinia Tranquillina
Regnal name
- Furia Sabinia Tranquillina Augusta
- Father: Gaius Furius Sabinius Aquila Timesitheus

Furia Sabinia Tranquillina (c. 225 – aft. 244 AD) was the Empress of Rome and wife of Emperor Gordian III. She was the young daughter of the Praetorian Prefect Timesitheus by an unknown wife.

== Father's rise to power and marriage ==
In 241 AD her father was appointed the head of the Praetorian Guard by the Roman Emperor Gordian III. Timesitheus was known to have great influence over the emperor, who was only 16 years old in 241 AD, having become emperor at age 13 in 238 AD, sponsored in this position by the power of the Praetorian Guard. After becoming the head of the Praetorian Guard, Timesitheus "effectively governed the Empire for Gordian". In May of 241 AD, Tranquillina was married to Gordian. She became a Roman Empress and received the honorific title of Augusta.

== Surviving her father and her husband ==
When Gordian III and Timesitheus went on a campaign against Shapur I of Persia, Tranquillina went with them. Her father died in 243 AD, of unknown but potentially suspicious causes. To replace him, Philip (Marcus Julius Philippus) became head of the Praetorian Guard, and quickly set to plotting to overthrow the young Gordian III. Tranquillina's husband, Gordian III, died in 244 AD under unclear, unknown circumstances, aged only 19. Tranquillina is believed to have outlived both her father and husband, however it is unclear what happened to her afterwards.

== Family tree ==
previous Maximinus Thrax; Roman Emperor; 235–238	Pupienus; Roman Emperor; 238	Gordian I Roman Emperor; 238 ∞ (?) Fabia Orestilla
Balbinus; Roman Emperor; 238	Gordian II co-emperor 238	Maecia Faustina	(doubted); Junius Licinius Balbus consul suffectus	Gaius Furius Sabinius Aquila Timesitheus praetorian prefect	next Philip the Arab; Roman Emperor; 244–249
Gordian III; Roman Emperor; 238	Furia Sabinia Tranquillina	Philip II; Roman Emperor co-emperor 247–249

== Nerva–Antonine family tree ==
Nerva–Antonine family tree

Q. Marcius Barea Soranus	Q. Marcius Barea Sura	Antonia Furnilla	M. Cocceius Nerva	Sergia Plautilla	P. Aelius Hadrianus
Titus (r. 79–81)	Marcia Furnilla	Marcia	Trajanus Pater	Nerva (r. 96–98)	Ulpia (Note: Sister of Trajan's father: Giacosa (1977), p. 7.)	Aelius Hadrianus Marullinus
Flavia (Note: Giacosa (1977), p. 8.)	Marciana (Note: Levick (2014), p. 161.)	C. Salonius Matidius (Note: Husband of Ulpia Marciana: Levick (2014), p. 161.)	Trajan (r. 98–117)	Plotina	P. Acilius Attianus	P. Aelius Afer (Note: Giacosa (1977), p. 7.)	Paulina Major (Note: DIR contributor (Herbert W. Benario, 2000), "Hadrian".)
Lucius Mindius (2)	Libo Rupilius Frugi (3)	Salonia Matidia (Note: Giacosa (1977), p. 9.)	L. Vibius Sabinus (1) (Note: Husband of Salonia Matidia: Levick (2014), p. 161.)
Paulina Minor	L. Julius Ursus Servianus (Note: Smith (1870), "Julius Servianus".)
Matidia Minor	Sabina	Hadrian (Note: Smith (1870), "Hadrian", pp. 319–322.) (r. 117–138)	Antinous (Note: Lover of Hadrian: Lambert (1984), p. 99 and passim; deification: Lamber (1984), pp. 2–5, etc.)
C. Fuscus Salinator I	Julia Serviana Paulina
M. Annius Verus (Note: Husband of Rupilia Faustina: Levick (2014), p. 163.)	Rupilia Faustina (Note: Levick (2014), p. 163.) (Note: It is uncertain whether Rupilia Faustina was Frugi's daughter by Salonia Matidia or another woman.)	Boionia Procilla	Cn. Arrius Antoninus
L. Ceionius Commodus	Appia Severa	C. Fuscus Salinator II
L. Caesennius Paetus	Arria Antonina	Arria Fadilla (Note: Levick (2014), p. 162.)	T. Aurelius Fulvus
L. Caesennius Antoninus	L. Commodus	Plautia	unknown (Note: Levick (2014), p. 164.)	C. Avidius Nigrinus
M. Annius Verus	Calvisia Domitia Lucilla (Note: Wife of M. Annius Verus: Giacosa (1977), p. 10.)	Fundania (Note: Wife of M. Annius Libo: Levick (2014), p. 163.)	M. Annius Libo	Faustina	Antoninus Pius (r. 138–161)	L. Aelius Caesar	Avidia
Cornificia	Marcus Aurelius (r. 161–180) (Note: Giacosa (1977), p. 10.)	Faustina Minor	C. Avidius Cassius (Note: The epitomator of Cassius Dio (72.22) gives the story that Faustina the Elder promised to marry Avidius Cassius. This is also echoed in HA "Marcus Aurelius" 24.)	Aurelia Fadilla	Lucius Verus (r. 161–169) (1)	Ceionia Fabia	Plautius Quintillus (Note: Husband of Ceionia Fabia: Levick (2014), p. 164.)	Q. Servilius Pudens	Ceionia Plautia
Cornificia Minor (Note: Levick (2014), p. 117.)	M. Petronius Sura	Commodus (r. 177–192)	Fadilla	M. Annius Verus Caesar	Ti. Claudius Pompeianus (2)	Lucilla	M. Plautius Quintillus	Junius Licinius Balbus	Servilia Ceionia
Petronius Antoninus	L. Aurelius Agaclytus (2)	Aurelia Sabina	L. Antistius Burrus (1)	Plautius Quintillus	Plautia Servilla	C. Furius Sabinus Timesitheus	Maecia Faustina	Junius Licinius Balbus?
Furia Sabinia Tranquillina	Gordian III (r. 238–244)

- (1) = 1st spouse
- (2) = 2nd spouse
- (3) = 3rd spouse
- Reddish-purple indicates emperor of the Nerva–Antonine dynasty
  lighter purple indicates designated imperial heir of said dynasty who never reigned
  grey indicates unsuccessful imperial aspirants
  bluish-purple indicates emperors of other dynasties
- dashed lines indicate adoption; dotted lines indicate love affairs/unmarried relationships
- Small Caps = posthumously deified (Augusti, Augustae, or other)

Notes:

Except where otherwise noted, the notes below indicate that an individual's parentage is as shown in the above family tree.

References:
- Giacosa, Giorgio (1977). Women of the Caesars: Their Lives and Portraits on Coins. Translated by Holloway, R. Ross. Milan: Edizioni Arte e Moneta. ISBN 0-8390-0193-2.
- Lambert, Royston (1984). Beloved and God: The Story of Hadrian and Antinous. New York: Viking. ISBN 0-670-15708-2.
- Levick, Barbara (2014). Faustina I and II: Imperial Women of the Golden Age. Oxford University Press. ISBN 978-0-19-537941-9.
- Smith, William, ed. (1870). Dictionary of Greek and Roman Biography and Mythology.

== Sources ==
- Prosopographia Imperii Romani (PIR) ² F 587

Royal titles
Preceded by Caecilia Paulina	Empress of Rome; 241–244	Succeeded by Marcia Otacilia Severa
