= Maecia Faustina =

Daughter of emperor Gordian I (born 201)

Maecia Faustina is the name given by the unreliable ancient text Augustan History for the daughter of Roman emperor Gordian I, sister of Gordian II, and mother of Gordian III. However, some modern historians dismiss this name as false and have instead called her Antonia Gordiana. She was a prominent and wealthy woman who lived in the troubled and unstable 3rd century and through her son had a massive influence on Roman politics.

== Biography ==
She was most probably born in Rome. Along with her elder brother, she was raised and spent her childhood in the house that Roman Republican general Pompey had built in Rome. Previous owners included Roman triumvir Mark Antony and Roman emperor Tiberius.

After 214, Maecia married a Roman senator whose name is unknown. The Augustan History names her husband as Junius Balbus, however modern historians dismiss this name as being incorrect.

She bore her husband a son on 20 January 225, the future emperor Marcus Antonius Gordianus Pius, or Gordian III. The birth name and birthplace of Gordian III are unknown, the name of Gordian was assumed by Maecia's son when he became emperor. Maecia's husband died before 238.

After the brief reigns of her father and brother, the Roman Senate in April appointed two senators, Balbinus and Pupienus, as joint emperors. During their brief reign, Maecia's son became popular with Roman citizens and the joint emperors were forced to adopt the child as their heir. On 29 July 238, Balbinus and Pupienus were both murdered by the Praetorian Guard; later that day her son became the new emperor. There is a possibility that Maecia might have bribed the Guards to murder the joint emperors, so that her son could become emperor.

To maintain the goodwill of the Senate, Gordian III assumed the name of his maternal grandfather and uncle. The political factions that supported Maecia's father and brother also supported her son. Through them, she was able to assist her son in directing affairs and together they sought to reform policies covering administration, fiscal affairs, and the Roman army. Efforts were made to limit the taxes on wealthy and notable Romans. Attention was directed to strengthening defences along the empire's borders and Roman governors were prosecuted if they abused Roman taxes and their powers in governing the provinces.

In 241, her son appointed the able and efficient Timesitheus as prefect of the Praetorian Guard. Later, in May of that year, Gordian married Timesitheus’ daughter Tranquillina, who became Roman empress. Timesitheus died in 243, and Gordian appointed the ambitious Philip the Arab as the new prefect. In February 244, Gordian died of unknown causes. Gordian either died in battle or was possibly murdered on the orders of Philip. Philip was then proclaimed the new emperor. Gordian III's wife and daughter survived him. The fate of Maecia after her son's death is unknown.

== Family tree ==
previous Maximinus Thrax; Roman Emperor; 235–238	Pupienus; Roman Emperor; 238	Gordian I Roman Emperor; 238 ∞ (?) Fabia Orestilla
Balbinus; Roman Emperor; 238	Gordian II co-emperor 238	Maecia Faustina	(doubted); Junius Licinius Balbus consul suffectus	Gaius Furius Sabinius Aquila Timesitheus praetorian prefect	next Philip the Arab; Roman Emperor; 244–249
Claudius II Gothicus (perhaps, although disputed, if so, his brother Quintillus became the next emperor and is also a member of the Gordianic dynasty); Roman Emperor; 268–270	Gordian III; Roman Emperor; 238	Furia Sabinia Tranquillina	Philip II; Roman Emperor co-emperor 247–249
CONSTANTINIAN DYNASTY, probably spurious
(see Family tree of Byzantine emperors)

== Nerva–Antonine family tree ==
Nerva–Antonine family tree

Q. Marcius Barea Soranus	Q. Marcius Barea Sura	Antonia Furnilla	M. Cocceius Nerva	Sergia Plautilla	P. Aelius Hadrianus
Titus (r. 79–81)	Marcia Furnilla	Marcia	Trajanus Pater	Nerva (r. 96–98)	Ulpia (Note: Sister of Trajan's father: Giacosa (1977), p. 7.)	Aelius Hadrianus Marullinus
Flavia (Note: Giacosa (1977), p. 8.)	Marciana (Note: Levick (2014), p. 161.)	C. Salonius Matidius (Note: Husband of Ulpia Marciana: Levick (2014), p. 161.)	Trajan (r. 98–117)	Plotina	P. Acilius Attianus	P. Aelius Afer (Note: Giacosa (1977), p. 7.)	Paulina Major (Note: DIR contributor (Herbert W. Benario, 2000), "Hadrian".)
Lucius Mindius (2)	Libo Rupilius Frugi (3)	Salonia Matidia (Note: Giacosa (1977), p. 9.)	L. Vibius Sabinus (1) (Note: Husband of Salonia Matidia: Levick (2014), p. 161.)
Paulina Minor	L. Julius Ursus Servianus (Note: Smith (1870), "Julius Servianus".)
Matidia Minor	Sabina	Hadrian (Note: Smith (1870), "Hadrian", pp. 319–322.) (r. 117–138)	Antinous (Note: Lover of Hadrian: Lambert (1984), p. 99 and passim; deification: Lamber (1984), pp. 2–5, etc.)
C. Fuscus Salinator I	Julia Serviana Paulina
M. Annius Verus (Note: Husband of Rupilia Faustina: Levick (2014), p. 163.)	Rupilia Faustina (Note: Levick (2014), p. 163.) (Note: It is uncertain whether Rupilia Faustina was Frugi's daughter by Salonia Matidia or another woman.)	Boionia Procilla	Cn. Arrius Antoninus
L. Ceionius Commodus	Appia Severa	C. Fuscus Salinator II
L. Caesennius Paetus	Arria Antonina	Arria Fadilla (Note: Levick (2014), p. 162.)	T. Aurelius Fulvus
L. Caesennius Antoninus	L. Commodus	Plautia	unknown (Note: Levick (2014), p. 164.)	C. Avidius Nigrinus
M. Annius Verus	Calvisia Domitia Lucilla (Note: Wife of M. Annius Verus: Giacosa (1977), p. 10.)	Fundania (Note: Wife of M. Annius Libo: Levick (2014), p. 163.)	M. Annius Libo	Faustina	Antoninus Pius (r. 138–161)	L. Aelius Caesar	Avidia
Cornificia	Marcus Aurelius (r. 161–180) (Note: Giacosa (1977), p. 10.)	Faustina Minor	C. Avidius Cassius (Note: The epitomator of Cassius Dio (72.22) gives the story that Faustina the Elder promised to marry Avidius Cassius. This is also echoed in HA "Marcus Aurelius" 24.)	Aurelia Fadilla	Lucius Verus (r. 161–169) (1)	Ceionia Fabia	Plautius Quintillus (Note: Husband of Ceionia Fabia: Levick (2014), p. 164.)	Q. Servilius Pudens	Ceionia Plautia
Cornificia Minor (Note: Levick (2014), p. 117.)	M. Petronius Sura	Commodus (r. 177–192)	Fadilla	M. Annius Verus Caesar	Ti. Claudius Pompeianus (2)	Lucilla	M. Plautius Quintillus	Junius Licinius Balbus	Servilia Ceionia
Petronius Antoninus	L. Aurelius Agaclytus (2)	Aurelia Sabina	L. Antistius Burrus (1)	Plautius Quintillus	Plautia Servilla	C. Furius Sabinus Timesitheus	Maecia Faustina	Junius Licinius Balbus?
Furia Sabinia Tranquillina	Gordian III (r. 238–244)

- (1) = 1st spouse
- (2) = 2nd spouse
- (3) = 3rd spouse
- Reddish-purple indicates emperor of the Nerva–Antonine dynasty
  lighter purple indicates designated imperial heir of said dynasty who never reigned
  grey indicates unsuccessful imperial aspirants
  bluish-purple indicates emperors of other dynasties
- dashed lines indicate adoption; dotted lines indicate love affairs/unmarried relationships
- Small Caps = posthumously deified (Augusti, Augustae, or other)

Notes:

Except where otherwise noted, the notes below indicate that an individual's parentage is as shown in the above family tree.

References:
- Giacosa, Giorgio (1977). Women of the Caesars: Their Lives and Portraits on Coins. Translated by Holloway, R. Ross. Milan: Edizioni Arte e Moneta. ISBN 0-8390-0193-2.
- Lambert, Royston (1984). Beloved and God: The Story of Hadrian and Antinous. New York: Viking. ISBN 0-670-15708-2.
- Levick, Barbara (2014). Faustina I and II: Imperial Women of the Golden Age. Oxford University Press. ISBN 978-0-19-537941-9.
- Smith, William, ed. (1870). Dictionary of Greek and Roman Biography and Mythology.

== Sources ==
- roman-emperors.org
- roman-emperors.org
- http://www.fofweb.com/Onfiles/Ancient/AncientDetail.asp?iPin=AGRW0295
- http://gordianiiirpc.ancients.info/reign%20of%20gordian.html
