= Paulina =

Prosopographical list of female relatives of Roman Emperor Hadrian

- Paulina Major from Guillaume Rouillé's Promptuarii Iconum Insigniorum
- Issue: Hadrian
- Father: Asceplus I

Paulina or Paullina (English: /pɔːˈlaɪnə/, Latin pronunciation: [pau̯ˈliːna]) is a common female given name in Latin. Paulina was a name shared by the mother, sister, and niece of the Roman emperor Hadrian.

== Paulina Major, mother of Hadrian ==
(Domitia) Paulina (or Paullina) Major (Major being Latin for 'the elder'), also known in English as Paulina the Elder (?–85/86) was a 1st-century Roman woman born in Gades (present-day Cádiz, Spain). She was a daughter of a distinguished senatorial family. Little is known about her life. She may have been related to Domitia Lucilla, grandmother of Marcus Aurelius; G. Di Vita-Evard speculated that they might have been half-sisters.

Paulina married Publius Aelius Hadrianus Afer, a Roman praetor, also born in Hispania, paternal cousin of Emperor Trajan. Paulina and Afer had two children: a daughter, Aelia Domitia Paulina (75–130), and a son, the future emperor Publius Aelius Hadrianus (76–138). Around 85 or 86 Paulina died of unknown causes, predeceasing her husband. After Afer's own death,their children were raised by Trajan and the Roman officer Publius Acilius Attianus.

== Paulina Minor, sister of Hadrian ==
Aelia Domitia Paulina or Paullina or Domitia Paulina Minor (Minor being Latin for 'the younger'), also known in English as Paulina the Younger (early 75–130), elder child and only daughter of Domitia Paulina Major and praetor Publius Aelius Hadrianus Afer, the only sibling of Hadrian. She was born and raised in present-day Spain, probably in Italica in Hispania Baetica province. After her parents died around 86, she and her brother were raised by their father's paternal cousin, the future emperor Trajan and officer Publius Acilius Attianus. Before his accession to the throne, Trajan arranged for Paulina Minor to marry the Iberian Roman politician Lucius Julius Ursus Servianus.

== Julia Paulina, niece of Hadrian ==
Julia (Serviana) Paulina (or Paullina) was the daughter and only child of Iberian Roman politician and consul Lucius Julius Ursus Servianus and Paulina Minor. She was born at an unknown time and place between 98 and 117, during the reign of her third cousin Emperor Trajan. Some time before Trajan's death in 117, her parents arranged for her to marry the Roman senator Gnaeus Pedanius Fuscus Salinator, ordinary consul in 118. Roman senator Pliny the Younger sent a letter of congratulations to her parents regarding her wedding (Epistulae, VI.26).

Her husband was originally from present-day Barcelona, Spain (then in the Roman province of Hispania Tarraconensis), himself son of a former consul of the same name. In 118, during her husband's consulship, Julia Paulina had a son, the younger Lucius Pedanius Fuscus Salinator. Julia Paulina and her husband seem to have both died before 136. Her father Servianus and Emperor Hadrian organised a private funeral for her. The Emperor was ridiculed by the public for only granting his niece a state funeral and apotheosis under pressure from the Senate, but bestowing a sumptuous funeral and full divine honours on his lover Antinous.

Julia's father Servianus cherished the idea that her son would succeed Hadrian, whom the aging Emperor himself considered his heir. He promoted the young Salinator, gave him special status in his court, and prepared him for the succession. However, in 136, Hadrian changed his mind and adopted Lucius Aelius Caesar as his heir. Julia's father and son planned to challenge his decision; to avoid any conflict, Hadrian ordered their deaths.

== Nerva–Antonine family tree ==
Nerva–Antonine family tree

Q. Marcius Barea Soranus	Q. Marcius Barea Sura	Antonia Furnilla	M. Cocceius Nerva	Sergia Plautilla	P. Aelius Hadrianus
Titus (r. 79–81)	Marcia Furnilla	Marcia	Trajanus Pater	Nerva (r. 96–98)	Ulpia (Note: Sister of Trajan's father: Giacosa (1977), p. 7.)	Aelius Hadrianus Marullinus
Flavia (Note: Giacosa (1977), p. 8.)	Marciana (Note: Levick (2014), p. 161.)	C. Salonius Matidius (Note: Husband of Ulpia Marciana: Levick (2014), p. 161.)	Trajan (r. 98–117)	Plotina	P. Acilius Attianus	P. Aelius Afer (Note: Giacosa (1977), p. 7.)	Paulina Major (Note: DIR contributor (Herbert W. Benario, 2000), "Hadrian".)
Lucius Mindius (2)	Libo Rupilius Frugi (3)	Salonia Matidia (Note: Giacosa (1977), p. 9.)	L. Vibius Sabinus (1) (Note: Husband of Salonia Matidia: Levick (2014), p. 161.)
Paulina Minor	L. Julius Ursus Servianus (Note: Smith (1870), "Julius Servianus".)
Matidia Minor	Sabina	Hadrian (Note: Smith (1870), "Hadrian", pp. 319–322.) (r. 117–138)	Antinous (Note: Lover of Hadrian: Lambert (1984), p. 99 and passim; deification: Lamber (1984), pp. 2–5, etc.)
C. Fuscus Salinator I	Julia Serviana Paulina
M. Annius Verus (Note: Husband of Rupilia Faustina: Levick (2014), p. 163.)	Rupilia Faustina (Note: Levick (2014), p. 163.) (Note: It is uncertain whether Rupilia Faustina was Frugi's daughter by Salonia Matidia or another woman.)	Boionia Procilla	Cn. Arrius Antoninus
L. Ceionius Commodus	Appia Severa	C. Fuscus Salinator II
L. Caesennius Paetus	Arria Antonina	Arria Fadilla (Note: Levick (2014), p. 162.)	T. Aurelius Fulvus
L. Caesennius Antoninus	L. Commodus	Plautia	unknown (Note: Levick (2014), p. 164.)	C. Avidius Nigrinus
M. Annius Verus	Calvisia Domitia Lucilla (Note: Wife of M. Annius Verus: Giacosa (1977), p. 10.)	Fundania (Note: Wife of M. Annius Libo: Levick (2014), p. 163.)	M. Annius Libo	Faustina	Antoninus Pius (r. 138–161)	L. Aelius Caesar	Avidia
Cornificia	Marcus Aurelius (r. 161–180) (Note: Giacosa (1977), p. 10.)	Faustina Minor	C. Avidius Cassius (Note: The epitomator of Cassius Dio (72.22) gives the story that Faustina the Elder promised to marry Avidius Cassius. This is also echoed in HA "Marcus Aurelius" 24.)	Aurelia Fadilla	Lucius Verus (r. 161–169) (1)	Ceionia Fabia	Plautius Quintillus (Note: Husband of Ceionia Fabia: Levick (2014), p. 164.)	Q. Servilius Pudens	Ceionia Plautia
Cornificia Minor (Note: Levick (2014), p. 117.)	M. Petronius Sura	Commodus (r. 177–192)	Fadilla	M. Annius Verus Caesar	Ti. Claudius Pompeianus (2)	Lucilla	M. Plautius Quintillus	Junius Licinius Balbus	Servilia Ceionia
Petronius Antoninus	L. Aurelius Agaclytus (2)	Aurelia Sabina	L. Antistius Burrus (1)	Plautius Quintillus	Plautia Servilla	C. Furius Sabinus Timesitheus	Maecia Faustina	Junius Licinius Balbus?
Furia Sabinia Tranquillina	Gordian III (r. 238–244)

- (1) = 1st spouse
- (2) = 2nd spouse
- (3) = 3rd spouse
- Reddish-purple indicates emperor of the Nerva–Antonine dynasty
  lighter purple indicates designated imperial heir of said dynasty who never reigned
  grey indicates unsuccessful imperial aspirants
  bluish-purple indicates emperors of other dynasties
- dashed lines indicate adoption; dotted lines indicate love affairs/unmarried relationships
- Small Caps = posthumously deified (Augusti, Augustae, or other)

Notes:

Except where otherwise noted, the notes below indicate that an individual's parentage is as shown in the above family tree.

References:
- Giacosa, Giorgio (1977). Women of the Caesars: Their Lives and Portraits on Coins. Translated by Holloway, R. Ross. Milan: Edizioni Arte e Moneta. ISBN 0-8390-0193-2.
- Lambert, Royston (1984). Beloved and God: The Story of Hadrian and Antinous. New York: Viking. ISBN 0-670-15708-2.
- Levick, Barbara (2014). Faustina I and II: Imperial Women of the Golden Age. Oxford University Press. ISBN 978-0-19-537941-9.
- Smith, William, ed. (1870). Dictionary of Greek and Roman Biography and Mythology.

== Sources ==
- Augustan History: Hadrian
- Hadrian (A.D. 117-138)
- Ancient Library
- Ancient Library 3125
