= Ulpia Marciana =

Elder sister of the Roman Emperor Trajan (48-112)

Diva Ulpia Marciana Augusta
- VLPIA MARCIANA
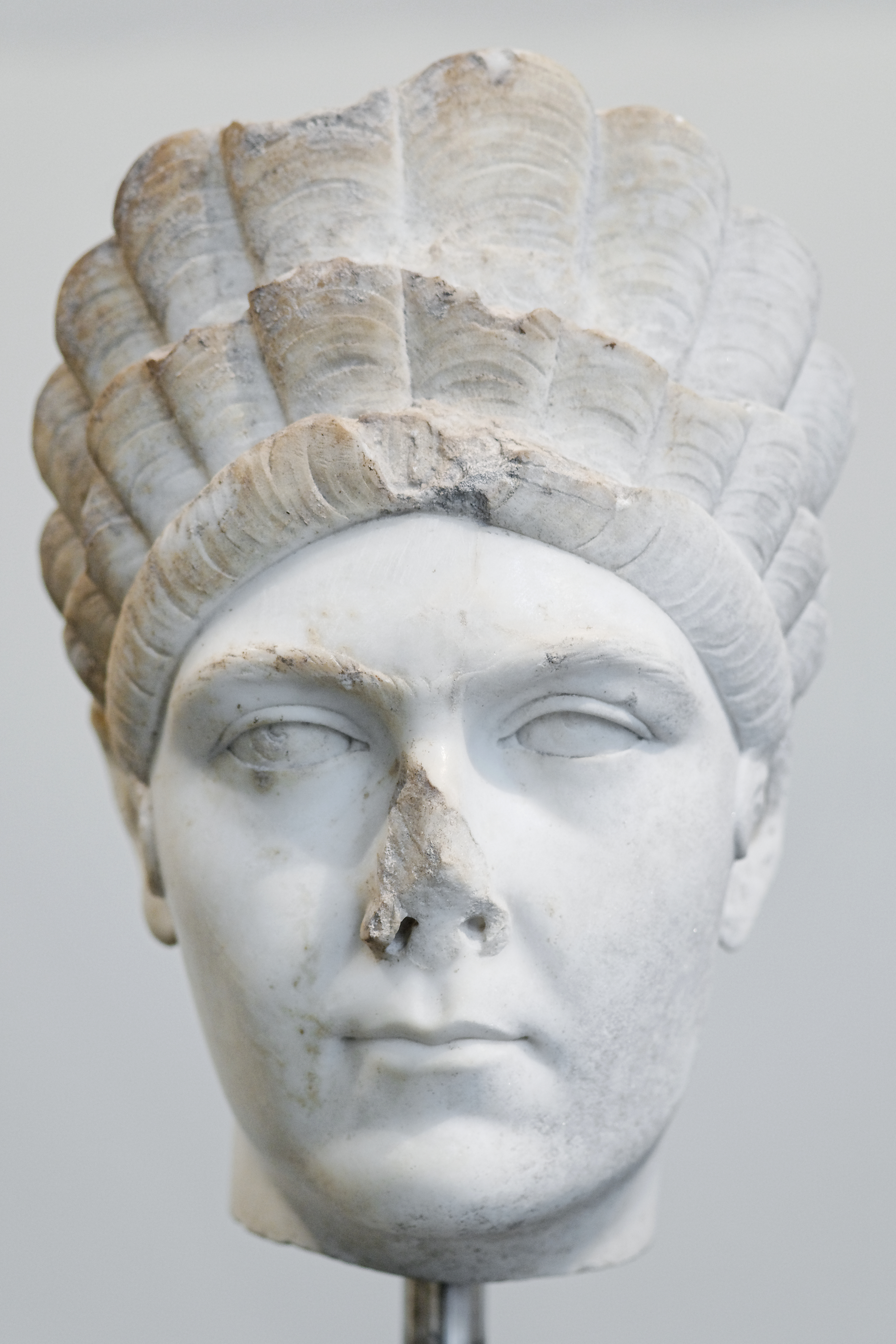
- Portrait bust of Ulpia Marciana
- Born: August 48 AD
- Died: 112–114
- Era: High Roman Empire
- Known for: sister of Trajan
- Spouse: Gaius Salonius Matidius Patruinus
- Children: Salonia Matidia
- Parents: Marcus Ulpius Traianus (father); Marcia (mother)
- Relatives: Vibia Sabina (granddaughter)
- Family: Ulpii Traiani; Nerva–Antonine dynasty
- Honours: Consecratio

Ulpia Marciana (August 48 – 112/114) was the beloved elder sister of Roman Emperor Trajan and grandmother of empress Vibia Sabina the wife of Hadrian. Upon her death, her brother had her deified.

== Life ==
She was the eldest child born to Roman woman Marcia and the Roman senator Marcus Ulpius Traianus. Her second name Marciana she inherited from her mother's paternal ancestors. Her birthplace is unknown.

Marciana married Gaius Salonius Matidius Patruinus. Patruinus was a wealthy man, who served as a praetor and later became a senator. He originally came from Vicetia (modern Vicenza in northern Italy). She bore Patruinus a daughter Salonia Matidia, who was born on 4 July 68. Patruinus died in 78 and Marciana never remarried. After Patruinus' death, Marciana and Matidia went to live with Trajan and his wife.

After 105, her brother awarded her with the title of Augusta. She was the first sister of a Roman Emperor to receive this title. Marciana did not accept this at first, but her sister-in-law, the Empress Pompeia Plotina, insisted that she take the title. She thus became part of the official imperial iconography and her statue was placed together with Trajan's and Plotina's over the Arches of Trajan in Ancona. Marciana was very close to Trajan and Plotina.

Marciana on a sestertius of Trajan

Marciana would often travel with her brother and assist him in decision-making. Throughout the Roman Empire, Marciana was honored with monuments and inscriptions in her name. There are two towns that Trajan founded in her honor in the Roman Empire. The first town was called Colonia Marciana Ulpia Traiana Thamugadi (modern Timgad, Algeria) and was founded around 100. This town was also named after the late parents of Marciana and Trajan. The other town was founded in 106 and was called Marcianopolis (which is now a part of modern Devnya, Bulgaria). Marciana died between 112 and 114 and was deified by the Senate at Trajan's behest.

== Nerva–Antonine family tree ==
Nerva–Antonine family tree

Q. Marcius Barea Soranus	Q. Marcius Barea Sura	Antonia Furnilla	M. Cocceius Nerva	Sergia Plautilla	P. Aelius Hadrianus
Titus (r. 79–81)	Marcia Furnilla	Marcia	Trajanus Pater	Nerva (r. 96–98)	Ulpia (Note: Sister of Trajan's father: Giacosa (1977), p. 7.)	Aelius Hadrianus Marullinus
Flavia (Note: Giacosa (1977), p. 8.)	Marciana (Note: Levick (2014), p. 161.)	C. Salonius Matidius (Note: Husband of Ulpia Marciana: Levick (2014), p. 161.)	Trajan (r. 98–117)	Plotina	P. Acilius Attianus	P. Aelius Afer (Note: Giacosa (1977), p. 7.)	Paulina Major (Note: DIR contributor (Herbert W. Benario, 2000), "Hadrian".)
Lucius Mindius (2)	Libo Rupilius Frugi (3)	Salonia Matidia (Note: Giacosa (1977), p. 9.)	L. Vibius Sabinus (1) (Note: Husband of Salonia Matidia: Levick (2014), p. 161.)
Paulina Minor	L. Julius Ursus Servianus (Note: Smith (1870), "Julius Servianus".)
Matidia Minor	Sabina	Hadrian (Note: Smith (1870), "Hadrian", pp. 319–322.) (r. 117–138)	Antinous (Note: Lover of Hadrian: Lambert (1984), p. 99 and passim; deification: Lambert (1984), pp. 2–5, etc.)
C. Fuscus Salinator I	Julia Serviana Paulina
M. Annius Verus (Note: Husband of Rupilia Faustina: Levick (2014), p. 163.)	Rupilia Faustina (Note: Levick (2014), p. 163.) (Note: It is uncertain whether Rupilia Faustina was Frugi's daughter by Salonia Matidia or another woman.)	Boionia Procilla	Cn. Arrius Antoninus
L. Ceionius Commodus	Appia Severa	C. Fuscus Salinator II
L. Caesennius Paetus	Arria Antonina	Arria Fadilla (Note: Levick (2014), p. 162.)	T. Aurelius Fulvus
L. Caesennius Antoninus	L. Commodus	Plautia	unknown (Note: Levick (2014), p. 164.)	C. Avidius Nigrinus
M. Annius Verus	Calvisia Domitia Lucilla (Note: Wife of M. Annius Verus: Giacosa (1977), p. 10.)	Fundania (Note: Wife of M. Annius Libo: Levick (2014), p. 163.)	M. Annius Libo	Faustina	Antoninus Pius (r. 138–161)	L. Aelius Caesar	Avidia
Cornificia	Marcus Aurelius (r. 161–180) (Note: Giacosa (1977), p. 10.)	Faustina Minor	Aurelia Fadilla	Lucius Verus (r. 161–169) (1)	Ceionia Fabia	Plautius Quintillus (Note: Husband of Ceionia Fabia: Levick (2014), p. 164.)	Q. Servilius Pudens	Ceionia Plautia
Cornificia Minor (Note: Levick (2014), p. 117.)	M. Petronius Sura	Commodus (r. 177–192)	Fadilla	M. Annius Verus Caesar	Ti. Claudius Pompeianus (2)	Lucilla	M. Plautius Quintillus	Junius Licinius Balbus	Servilia Ceionia
Petronius Antoninus	L. Aurelius Agaclytus (2)	Aurelia Sabina	L. Antistius Burrus (1)	Plautius Quintillus	Plautia Servilla	C. Furius Sabinus Timesitheus	Maecia Faustina	Junius Licinius Balbus?
Furia Sabinia Tranquillina	Gordian III (r. 238–244)

- (1) = 1st spouse
- (2) = 2nd spouse
- (3) = 3rd spouse
- Reddish-purple indicates emperor of the Nerva–Antonine dynasty
  lighter purple indicates designated imperial heir of said dynasty who never reigned
  grey indicates unsuccessful imperial aspirants
  bluish-purple indicates emperors of other dynasties
- dashed lines indicate adoption; dotted lines indicate love affairs/unmarried relationships
- Small Caps = posthumously deified (Augusti, Augustae, or other)

Notes:

Except where otherwise noted, the notes below indicate that an individual's parentage is as shown in the above family tree.

References:
- DIR contributors (2000). "De Imperatoribus Romanis: An Online Encyclopedia of Roman Rulers and Their Families".
- Giacosa, Giorgio (1977). Women of the Caesars: Their Lives and Portraits on Coins. Translated by Holloway, R. Ross. Milan: Edizioni Arte e Moneta. ISBN 0-8390-0193-2.
- Lambert, Royston (1984). Beloved and God: The Story of Hadrian and Antinous. New York: Viking. ISBN 0-670-15708-2.
- Levick, Barbara (2014). Faustina I and II: Imperial Women of the Golden Age. Oxford University Press. ISBN 978-0-19-537941-9.
- Smith, William, ed. (1870). Dictionary of Greek and Roman Biography and Mythology.

== See also ==
- Ulpia gens
