= Ulpia (grandmother of Hadrian) =

Aunt of Trajan grandmother Hadrian

- Citizenship: Roman
- Known for: Relative of the Nerva–Antonine dynasty
- Spouse: Publius Aelius Hadrianus Marullinus
- Children: Publius Aelius Hadrianus Afer
- Father: Marcus Ulpius

Ulpia (full name possibly Ulpia Plotina, c. 31 – before 86) was a noble Roman woman from the gens Ulpia settled in Spain during the 1st century CE. She was the paternal aunt of the Roman emperor Trajan and the paternal grandmother of the emperor Hadrian.

== Life ==
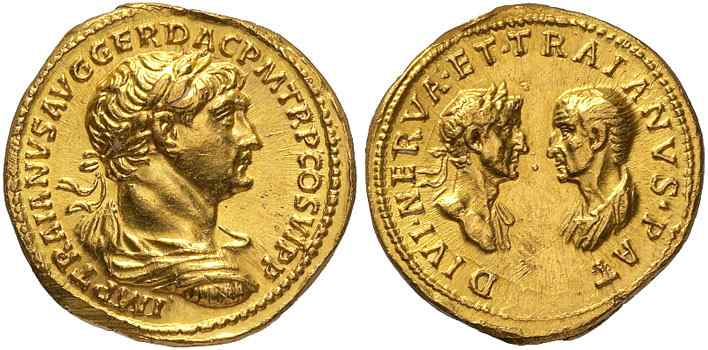
Roman aureus struck under Trajan, c. 115. The reverse commemorates both Trajan's natural father and Ulpia's brother, Marcus Ulpius Traianus (right), and his adoptive father, the deified Nerva (left).

Her paternal ancestors moved from Italy and settled in Italica (near modern Seville, Spain) in the Roman Province of Hispania Baetica. Her brother was Marcus Ulpius Traianus, who served as a distinguished Roman general and was the first person in her family to enter the Roman Senate. He was the biological father of Trajan, adopted son and heir of the deified emperor Nerva.

Ulpia married a Roman Senator, Publius Aelius Hadrianus Marullinus, a wealthy and aristocratic Roman in Hispania from the gens Aelia. Ulpia and Marullinus had at least one son, Publius Aelius Hadrianus Afer, who would become a distinct Roman soldier and politician. He married a noble Roman woman in Spain called Domitia Paulina and the couple had Aelia Domitia Paulina and Publius Aelius Hadrianus or Hadrian, who was adopted by Trajan and became his heir.

== Identification ==
A very wealthy woman named Ulpia M. f. Plotina ("M. f." meaning her fathers praenomen was Marcus) that is attested from a triptych dated July 19, 69 AD from Herculaneum has been speculated by several historians to be Trajan's aunt and Hadrian's grandmother. This is mainly due to sharing her rare cognomen with Trajan's wife Pompeia Plotina, which by extension has also led to speculation that Trajan and empress Pompeia Plotina were related. The inscription describes this Ulpia Plotina being owed 15,000 denarii by a businessman named Lucius Cominius Primus. Based on another text Primus was also lending money to a woman named Pompeia Anthis who was in the custody of a man named Gaius Vibius Erytus. As with the Pompeii, the gens Vibia was associated with the imperial family through Trajan, his grandniece being Vibia Sabina, the eventual consort of Hadrian. Historians theorizing this include Päivi Setälä, Alison E. Cooley, Christian Settipani, Anthony R. Birley, and Julian Bennett; Ronald Syme did not assume an exact relation to the imperial family but believed her to be a kinswoman of Trajan.

== Nerva–Antonine family tree ==
Nerva–Antonine family tree

Q. Marcius Barea Soranus	Q. Marcius Barea Sura	Antonia Furnilla	M. Cocceius Nerva	Sergia Plautilla	P. Aelius Hadrianus
Titus (r. 79–81)	Marcia Furnilla	Marcia	Trajanus Pater	Nerva (r. 96–98)	Ulpia (Note: Sister of Trajan's father: Giacosa (1977), p. 7.)	Aelius Hadrianus Marullinus
Flavia (Note: Giacosa (1977), p. 8.)	Marciana (Note: Levick (2014), p. 161.)	C. Salonius Matidius (Note: Husband of Ulpia Marciana: Levick (2014), p. 161.)	Trajan (r. 98–117)	Plotina	P. Acilius Attianus	P. Aelius Afer (Note: Giacosa (1977), p. 7.)	Paulina Major (Note: DIR contributor (Herbert W. Benario, 2000), "Hadrian".)
Lucius Mindius (2)	Libo Rupilius Frugi (3)	Salonia Matidia (Note: Giacosa (1977), p. 9.)	L. Vibius Sabinus (1) (Note: Husband of Salonia Matidia: Levick (2014), p. 161.)
Paulina Minor	L. Julius Ursus Servianus (Note: Smith (1870), "Julius Servianus".)
Matidia Minor	Sabina	Hadrian (Note: Smith (1870), "Hadrian", pp. 319–322.) (r. 117–138)	Antinous (Note: Lover of Hadrian: Lambert (1984), p. 99 and passim; deification: Lamber (1984), pp. 2–5, etc.)
C. Fuscus Salinator I	Julia Serviana Paulina
M. Annius Verus (Note: Husband of Rupilia Faustina: Levick (2014), p. 163.)	Rupilia Faustina (Note: Levick (2014), p. 163.) (Note: It is uncertain whether Rupilia Faustina was Frugi's daughter by Salonia Matidia or another woman.)	Boionia Procilla	Cn. Arrius Antoninus
L. Ceionius Commodus	Appia Severa	C. Fuscus Salinator II
L. Caesennius Paetus	Arria Antonina	Arria Fadilla (Note: Levick (2014), p. 162.)	T. Aurelius Fulvus
L. Caesennius Antoninus	L. Commodus	Plautia	unknown (Note: Levick (2014), p. 164.)	C. Avidius Nigrinus
M. Annius Verus	Calvisia Domitia Lucilla (Note: Wife of M. Annius Verus: Giacosa (1977), p. 10.)	Fundania (Note: Wife of M. Annius Libo: Levick (2014), p. 163.)	M. Annius Libo	Faustina	Antoninus Pius (r. 138–161)	L. Aelius Caesar	Avidia
Cornificia	Marcus Aurelius (r. 161–180) (Note: Giacosa (1977), p. 10.)	Faustina Minor	C. Avidius Cassius (Note: The epitomator of Cassius Dio (72.22) gives the story that Faustina the Elder promised to marry Avidius Cassius. This is also echoed in HA "Marcus Aurelius" 24.)	Aurelia Fadilla	Lucius Verus (r. 161–169) (1)	Ceionia Fabia	Plautius Quintillus (Note: Husband of Ceionia Fabia: Levick (2014), p. 164.)	Q. Servilius Pudens	Ceionia Plautia
Cornificia Minor (Note: Levick (2014), p. 117.)	M. Petronius Sura	Commodus (r. 177–192)	Fadilla	M. Annius Verus Caesar	Ti. Claudius Pompeianus (2)	Lucilla	M. Plautius Quintillus	Junius Licinius Balbus	Servilia Ceionia
Petronius Antoninus	L. Aurelius Agaclytus (2)	Aurelia Sabina	L. Antistius Burrus (1)	Plautius Quintillus	Plautia Servilla	C. Furius Sabinus Timesitheus	Maecia Faustina	Junius Licinius Balbus?
Furia Sabinia Tranquillina	Gordian III (r. 238–244)

- (1) = 1st spouse
- (2) = 2nd spouse
- (3) = 3rd spouse
- Reddish-purple indicates emperor of the Nerva–Antonine dynasty
  lighter purple indicates designated imperial heir of said dynasty who never reigned
  grey indicates unsuccessful imperial aspirants
  bluish-purple indicates emperors of other dynasties
- dashed lines indicate adoption; dotted lines indicate love affairs/unmarried relationships
- Small Caps = posthumously deified (Augusti, Augustae, or other)

Notes:

Except where otherwise noted, the notes below indicate that an individual's parentage is as shown in the above family tree.

References:
- Giacosa, Giorgio (1977). Women of the Caesars: Their Lives and Portraits on Coins. Translated by Holloway, R. Ross. Milan: Edizioni Arte e Moneta. ISBN 0-8390-0193-2.
- Lambert, Royston (1984). Beloved and God: The Story of Hadrian and Antinous. New York: Viking. ISBN 0-670-15708-2.
- Levick, Barbara (2014). Faustina I and II: Imperial Women of the Golden Age. Oxford University Press. ISBN 978-0-19-537941-9.
- Smith, William, ed. (1870). Dictionary of Greek and Roman Biography and Mythology.

== Sources ==
- History of Horoscopic Astrology By James H. Holden
- Rodgers, N., The History and Conquests of Ancient Rome, Hermes House, 2005.
- Syme, Tacitus, 30–44; PIR Vlpivs 575
- "Roman Emperors - DIR Trajan". roman-emperors.org.
- "Roman Emperors - DIR hadrian". roman-emperors.org.
- "Roman Emperors DIR Roman legions". roman-emperors.org.
- "The Stemmata of the 5 Good Emperors". roman-emperors.org.
- "Museum of Antiquities | Original Roman Coins | Hadrian". Archived from the original on 2012-10-02.
- Perowne, S. (1960). Hadrian. Croom Helm. ISBN 9780709940487.
