= Catilia gens =

Plebeian family of the late Roman Republic and early Empire

The gens Catilia was a minor plebeian family at ancient Rome, found from the first century BC and throughout imperial times. Only a few members of this gens are mentioned in history, though others occur in epigraphy. The most illustrious of the Catilii was Lucius Catilius Severus, consul in AD 120, and one of the ancestors of Marcus Aurelius. Another Catilius Severus was among the advisors of Severus Alexander.

== Origin ==
The nomen Catilius belongs to a large class of gentilicia formed from diminutive cognomina ending in -ulus. The surname Catulus indicated a puppy, and was one of an abundant group of cognomina derived from the names of animals and everyday objects. It seems to be cognate with the nomen Catius, and the surname Cato, famous from the Porcii Catones.

== Praenomina ==
The main praenomina of the Catilii were Lucius, Gaius, Publius, and Gnaeus, of which the senatorial family of the Catilii Severi preferred Lucius and Gnaeus. An early family of this gens used Gaius and Titus, but otherwise the latter name was one of several praenomina found only once or twice among the Catilii, such as Aulus, Marcus, Numerius, and Quintus.

== Branches and cognomina ==
Although many Catilii bear typical Roman cognomina, the only distinct branch of the family to appear in history used the surname Severus, originally designating someone stern or severe in manner. The earliest known member of this consular family was a Gnaeus Catilius, whose name appears in his son's filiation. A later Gnaeus Catilius Severus appears in inscriptions of the Arval Brethren, and might refer to the same Catilius Severus who later served on the consilium of Severus Alexander, to whom he was related.

== Members ==
This list includes abbreviated praenomina. For an explanation of this practice, see filiation.

- Titus Catilius, the former master of the freedwoman Catilia Eutychis, and the freedman Titus Catilius Plocamus, mentioned in a sepulchral inscription from Rome, dating from the first half of the first century BC. The freedman Titus Catilius Philargurus was probably manumitted by his brother or another man in his family, while Titus Catilius Euathes was probably manumitted by his wife, or another woman in his family.
- Gaius Catilius, the former master of Titus Catilius Philargurus, a freedman named in a sepulchral inscription from Rome, dating from the first half of the first century BC, along with several other freedmen of the same family.
- Catilia T. l. Eutychis, (Note: Spelled "Eytichini" (dative for "Eytichis") in one inscription, "Euticis" in the other.) a freedwoman buried at Rome, in a family sepulchre built by her brother, the freedman Gaius Valgius Metrodorus, for himself, his sister, and her fellow freedmen, Titus Catilius Philargurus, Titus Catilius Plocamus, and Titus Catilius Euathes, dating from the first half of the first century BC.
- Titus Catilius C. l. Philargurus, a freedman buried at Rome, in a family sepulchre built by the freedman Gaius Valgius Metrodorus for himself, his sister, Catilia Eutychis, and several freedmen of the Catilii, dating from the first half of the first century BC.
- Titus Catilius T. l. Plocamus, a freedman buried at Rome, in a family sepulchre built by the freedman Gaius Valgius Metrodorus for himself, his sister, Catilia Eutychis, and several freedmen of the Catilii, dating from the first half of the first century BC.
- Titus Catilius Ɔ. l. Euathes, a freedman buried at Rome, in a family sepulchre built by the freedman Gaius Valgius Metrodorus for himself, his sister, Catilia Eutychis, and several freedmen of the Catilii, dating from the first half of the first century BC.
- Gaius Catilius C. l. Primus, supposedly a freedman who became one of the magistrates of a vicus, or neighborhood at Rome, according to a sepulchral inscription dating between the middle of the first century BC and the first century AD. The inscription is thought to be a forgery.
- Aulus Catilius, one of the municipal quattuorvirs at Interamna Nahars in Umbria during the late first century BC.
- Catilia, the daughter of Ummidianus, dedicated a tomb at Rome, dating from the first half of the first century, for her husband, Lucius Alfius Alfianus, a consular viator, or messenger.
- Gaius Catilius Anoptes, buried at Rome, aged thirty, in a tomb dating from the first half of the first century.
- Catilia C. l. Prima, a freedwoman named along with Gaius Catilius Primus, in an inscription from Rome dating from the first half of the first century.
- Gaius Catilius C. l. Primus, a freedman named along with Catilia Prima, in an inscription from Rome dating from the first half of the first century.
- Catilia C. l. Acte, a young freedwoman buried in a first-century tomb at Rome, aged between eleven and fourteen.
- Lucius Catilius Gamus, buried in a first-century tomb at Rome, aged forty-seven.
- Catilius Paternus, the father of Catilia Paula, named in a first-century inscription from the present site of Villards-d'Heria, formerly part of Germania Superior.
- Catilia Paula, the daughter of Catilius Paternus, named in a first-century inscription from the present site of Villards-d'Heria.
- Catilia Prima, a woman buried in a first-century tomb at Rome, aged twenty-seven.
- Catilia, named in a sepulchral inscription from Rome, dating between the middle of the first century, and the end of the second.
- Catilia Paulina, buried at Rome, in a tomb dating between the middle of the first century, and the end of the second, dedicated by her children, Lucius Catilius Felix and Catilia Lucina for their mother, their father, Casinas, and his wife, Critia Lucina.
- Lucius Catilius Felix, along with his sister, Catilia Lucina, dedicated a tomb at Rome, dating between the middle of the first century and the end of the second, for their mother, Catilia Paulina, father, Casinas, and his wife, Critia Lucina.
- Catilia Lucina, along with her brother, Lucius Catilius Felix, dedicated a tomb at Rome, dating between the middle of the first century and the end of the second, for their mother, Catilia Paulina, father, Casinas, and his wife, Critia Lucina.
- Catilius P. f. Longus, a military tribune serving in the Legio IV Scythica at Apamea Myrlea in Bithynia and Pontus during the reign of Vespasian, he was prefect of the sagittarii, an auxiliary unit consisting of archers.
- Gaius Catilius Scaeva, a signifer, or standard-bearer, in the Legio XI Claudia, serving in the century of Orgius, stationed at Vindonissa in Germania Superior in AD 90.
- Catilia T. f. Pia, buried at Rome, in a tomb built by her husband, Titus Flavius Vestalis, a freedman of one of the Flavian emperors, dating from the first quarter of the second century.
- Catilia, a woman mentioned in a second-century inscription honoring a group of priests at Divio in Germania Superior.
- Lucius Catilius Epagathus, buried at Portus in Latium, along with his wife, Catilia Hygia, in a second-century tomb built by their son, also named Lucius Catilius Epagathus.
- Lucius Catilius Euphemus, the husband of Catilia Helene, with whom he dedicated a second-century tomb at Rome for their son, Euphemianus.
- Catilia Helene, the wife of Lucius Catilius Euphemus, with whom she dedicated a second-century tomb at Rome for their son, Euphemianus.
- Lucius Catilius L. f. Euphemianus, a young man buried at Rome, aged eighteen years, eight months, and eight days, in a second-century tomb built by his parents Lucius Catilius Euphemus and Catilia Helene.
- Catilia Hygia, buried at Portus, along with her husband, Lucius Catilius Epagathus, in a second-century tomb built by their son, also named Lucius Catilius Epagathus.
- Lucius Catilius L. f. Epagathus, dedicated a second-century tomb at Portus for his parents, Lucius Catilius Epagathus and Catilia Hygia.
- Catilia Marciana, dedicated a second-century tomb at Rome for her husband of thirteen years, Marcus Aemilius Januarius, aged thirty-two years, six months, and five days. Their children, Marcus Aemilius Agathemer, Marcus Aemilius Marcianus, and Aemilia Ingenua, are also named in the dedication.
- Gnaeus Catilius, (Note: His son's nomenclature has suggested to some scholars that the consul could have been a Gnaeus Claudius Severus adopted by a Lucius Catilius, as a senatorial family of the Claudii from Asia Minor included several persons by that name; but Olli Salomies concludes that he was almost certainly the son of a Gnaeus Catilius, rather than adopted from the Claudii Severi.) father of the consul Lucius Catilius Severus, is known only from epigraphy.
- Lucius Catilius Cn. f. Severus Julianus Claudius Reginus, consul in AD 120, served as governor of Syria under Hadrian, and was subsequently named praefectus urbi. The emperor removed him from this office when he expressed his disapproval of Hadrian's adoption of Antoninus Pius in 138. Severus was the great-grandfather of Marcus Aurelius.
- Gaius Catilius Athenodorus, named on a cinerarium at Forum Novum in Sabinum, dating from the second quarter of the second century. Most of his name has been erased, for unknown reasons.
- Catilia Fortunata, dedicated a tomb at Nola in Campania, dating between the middle of the second century, and the middle of the third, for her husband, Lupus, an actor, or agent.
- Catilia Tryphina, buried at Domavium in Dalmatia, aged fifty, in a tomb dedicated by her husband, Julius Atticus, and son, Marcus Catilius Maximus, dating between the middle of the second and the end of the third century.
- Numerius Catilius Festivus, one of several persons mentioned in an inscription found at the present site of Lamas, formerly part of Lusitania, dating from the reign of Marcus Aurelius.
- Gaius Catilius Modestinus, a member of a priestly college at Rome, possibly the Arval Brethren, during the reign of Marcus Aurelius.
- Catilia Attia, dedicated a second- or third-century tomb, at the modern site of Vallerotonda in Latium, for her husband, Titus Claudius Gillianus.
- Marcus Catilius Maximus, the son of Catilia Tryphina, a woman buried in a second- or third-century tomb at Domavium, built by Maximus and her husband, Julius Atticus.
- Catilia Respecta, buried at Tomi in Moesia Inferior, along with her daughter, Sempronia Rufina, and grandson, Allidius Secundinus, in a family sepulchre dedicated by her grandsons, Gaius Allidius Rufinus and Gaius Allidius Rufus, and built by their father, Gaius Allidius Rufus, dating between the middle of the second century and the end of the third.
- Lucius Catilius Primus, one of the Seviri Augustales, buried at the present site of Castelmagno in Apulia, in a tomb built by his colleague, Augustianus, and dating from the late second or early third century.
- Quintus Catilius Victor, a soldier in the fifth cohort of the vigiles at Rome in AD 210. He served in the century of Gaius Antonius Antullus.
- Gnaeus Catilius Severus, a member of the Arval Brethren at Rome between AD 183 and 218, perhaps to be identified with Catilius Severus, advisor to Alexander Severus.
- Catilius Severus, a member of Alexander Severus' council, he was related to the emperor, and described as the most learned of men.
- Catilia, buried at Rome on the ninth day before the Kalends of July (Note: June 22.) in AD 290, in a tomb dedicated by her mother, Ingenua.
- Catilia, named in a fragmentary fourth- or fifth-century sepulchral inscription from Rome.

=== Undated Catilii ===
- Catilia, a woman buried at Rome.
- Catilia, together with Faventius, one of the heirs of Alphia, named in an inscription from Limonum in Aquitania.
- Catilius, dedicated a tomb at Rome for his wife, Papinia Secundina.
- Catilius, buried at the present site of El Hamima, formerly part of Africa Proconsularis, aged one hundred.
- Catilius, a potter whose maker's mark has been found at the site of modern Izernore, formerly part of Gallia Lugdunensis.
- Catilius, a potter whose maker's mark has been found at Bagacum in Gallia Belgica.
- Lucius Catilius, a potter whose maker's mark has been found at Pompeii in Campania.
- Lucius Catilius, named in an inscription from Aquileia in Venetia and Histria.
- Gnaeus Catilius Atticus, the master of Tertia, a slave-woman buried at Apamea in Bithynia and Pontus, aged twenty-five, in a tomb dedicated by her brother, Tertius.
- Catilia Euphemia, a freedwoman buried at Rome, along with her husband, Catilius Symbulus, in a family sepulchre built by Marcus Servilius Hermes and Servilia Euche.
- Marcus Catilius Felicianus, named in an inscription dedicated to the emperor at Municipium Turcetanum in Africa Proconsularis.
- Lucius Catilius Felix, together with Lucius Catilius Lupus, potters whose makers' mark appears on ceramics found at Placentia in Cisalpine Gaul.
- Catilia Gaiana, buried at Rome, in a tomb built by her husband, Axitheus.
- Lucius Catilius Lupus, together with Lucius Catilius Felix, potters whose makers' mark appears on ceramics found at Placentia in Cisalpine Gaul.
- Catilius Primigenes, dedicated a tomb at Stobi in Macedonia for his wife, Julia Sabina.
- Publius Catilius P. l. Primus, a freedman buried at Interamna Nahars, along with Publius Catilius Serranus and several other freedmen.
- Gaius Catilius Sabinus, a priest named in an inscription from Castelmagno in Apulia.
- Publius Catilius P. l. Serranus, a freedman buried at Interamna Nahars, along with Publius Catilius Primus and several other freedmen.
- Catilia Severa, the mistress of Carpophorus, a slave buried at Rome, in a tomb dedicated by Thalerus.
- Catilia Severa, a potter whose maker's mark has been found at Vibinum and Teanum Apulum in Apulia.
- Catilius Symbulus, a freedman buried at Rome, along with his wife, Catilia Euphemia, in a family sepulchre built by Marcus Servilius Hermes and Servilia Euche.
- Catilius Vest[...], a potter whose maker's mark appears on ceramics from Forum Julii in Gallia Narbonensis.

== See also ==
- List of Roman gentes

== Bibliography ==
- Gaius Plinius Caecilius Secundus (Pliny the Younger), Epistulae (Letters).
- Aelius Lampridius, Aelius Spartianus, Flavius Vopiscus, Julius Capitolinus, Trebellius Pollio, and Vulcatius Gallicanus, Historia Augusta (Lives of the Emperors).
- Dictionary of Greek and Roman Biography and Mythology, William Smith, ed., Little, Brown and Company, Boston (1849).
- Theodor Mommsen et alii, Corpus Inscriptionum Latinarum (The Body of Latin Inscriptions, abbreviated CIL), Berlin-Brandenburgische Akademie der Wissenschaften (1853–present).
- Bulletin Archéologique du Comité des Travaux Historiques et Scientifiques (Archaeological Bulletin of the Committee on Historic and Scientific Works, abbreviated BCTH), Imprimerie Nationale, Paris (1885–1973).
- René Cagnat et alii, L'Année épigraphique (The Year in Epigraphy, abbreviated AE), Presses Universitaires de France (1888–present).
- Inscriptiones Christianae Urbis Romae (Christian Inscriptions from the City of Rome, abbreviated ICUR), New Series, Rome (1922–present).
- La Carte Archéologique de la Gaule (Archaeological Map of Gaul, abbreviated CAG), Académie des Inscriptions et Belles-Lettres (1931–present).
- Epigraphica, Rivista Italiana di Epigrafia (1939–present).
- Anthony R. Birley, Marcus Aurelius, B. T. Batsford, London (1966).
- Olli Salomies, Adoptive and Polyonymous Nomenclature in the Roman Empire, Societas Scientiarum Fenica, Helsinki (1992).
