= Lucius Catilius Severus =

2nd century Roman senator, consul and general

Lucius Catilius Severus Julianus Claudius Reginus was a Roman senator and general active during the reigns of Trajan and Hadrian. He was appointed consul twice: the first time in 110 CE (as consul suffectus) with Gaius Erucianus Silo as his colleague; the second in the year 120 (as consul ordinarius) with the future emperor Antoninus Pius as his colleague. Catilius was also the step-great-grandfather of the emperor Marcus Aurelius.

Catilius is called Lucius Catilius Severus Julianus in Bithynian inscriptions, Lucius Catilius Severus as a consul, and Catilius Severus in literary sources. His family origins probably lie in Apamea, a town of Bithynia. In his monograph of naming practices in the first centuries of the Roman Empire, Olli Salomies notes that this polyonymous name implies an adoption, "no doubt the son of a Cn. Catilius, not the son of a Cn. Claudius adopted by a L. Catilius, in spite of the existence of senatorial Cn. Claudii Severi from Asia Minor."

== Career ==
The cursus honorum of Catilius Severus is preserved in an inscription recovered from Antium. His earliest recorded office was the first of the traditional republican magistracies, quaestor, which enabled him to be enrolled as a member of the Senate; in his case, he was assigned as quaestor to the province of Asia. He advanced to the traditional Roman magistracy of plebeian tribune; the fact he was praetor is omitted from this inscription, but must be presumed because it was required for the following offices Catilius is recorded as holding.

Normally a senator destined for the consulate would hold only two offices, command of a legion and governorship of a province or prefect of one of the aerarii or treasuries: Catilius held six of these. First in the list was prefectus frumenti dandi (or Prefect responsible for the distribution of Rome's free grain dole), next was legatus or assistant to the proconsular governor of Asia, then curator of an unnamed road, legatus legionis or commander of Legio XXII Primigenia, and lastly prefect of each of the treasuries, aerarium militare in the years 105 to 107, then the aerarium Saturni in 108 to 110. At this point Catilius entered his first consulate.

Following his term as suffect consul, Catilius was admitted to the Septemviri epulonum, one of the four most prestigious collegia of ancient Roman priests. In 114 he was appointed governor of Cappadocia-Armenia. During his tenure, Catilius participated in Trajan's campaign against the Parthian empire, and received a number of dona militaria or military decorations. In the Fall of 117, following the death of Trajan, his heir Hadrian appointed Catilius to replace him as governor of Syria so Hadrian could return to Rome. Catilius remained as governor of Syria until 119. After his second consulate in 120, Catilius held the proconsular governorship of Africa in 124/125, then was prefect of Rome. To hold just one of these offices, in the Empire, was considered the apex of a successful senatorial career; holding two of them proves not only his success but his favor with Hadrian.

== Family ==
Catilius is believed to have been the third husband of Dasumia Polla, the widow of Gnaeus Domitius Tullus; Tullus had adopted his niece Domitia Lucilla the Elder, who would become the grandmother of the later Emperor Marcus Aurelius, whose upbringing he influenced. Marcus Aurelius later recalled Catilius Severus' influence in his life as preventing him from attending "public places of teaching but to have enjoyed good teachers at home, and to have learned that it is a duty to spend liberally on such things."

Two Gnaei Catilii Severi, attested as members of the Arval Brethren in 183 and 213 to 218, were doubtlessly the descendants of Catilius, or at the least from his family.

== See also ==
- Catilia gens

Political offices
Preceded by Gaius Avidius Nigrinus, and Tiberius Julius Aquila Polemaeanus as suffect consuls	Suffect consul of the Roman Empire; 110 with Gaius Erucianus Silo	Succeeded by Aulus Larcius Priscus, and Sextus Marcius Honoratus as suffect consuls
Preceded by Gaius Herennius Capella, and Lucius Coelius Rufus as suffect consuls	Consul of the Roman Empire; 120 with Titus Aurelius Fulvus Boionius Arrius Antoninus	Succeeded by Gaius Quinctius Certus Poblicius Marcellus, and Titus Rutilius Propinquus as suffect consuls
