= Lorium =

Ancient village of ancient Etruria

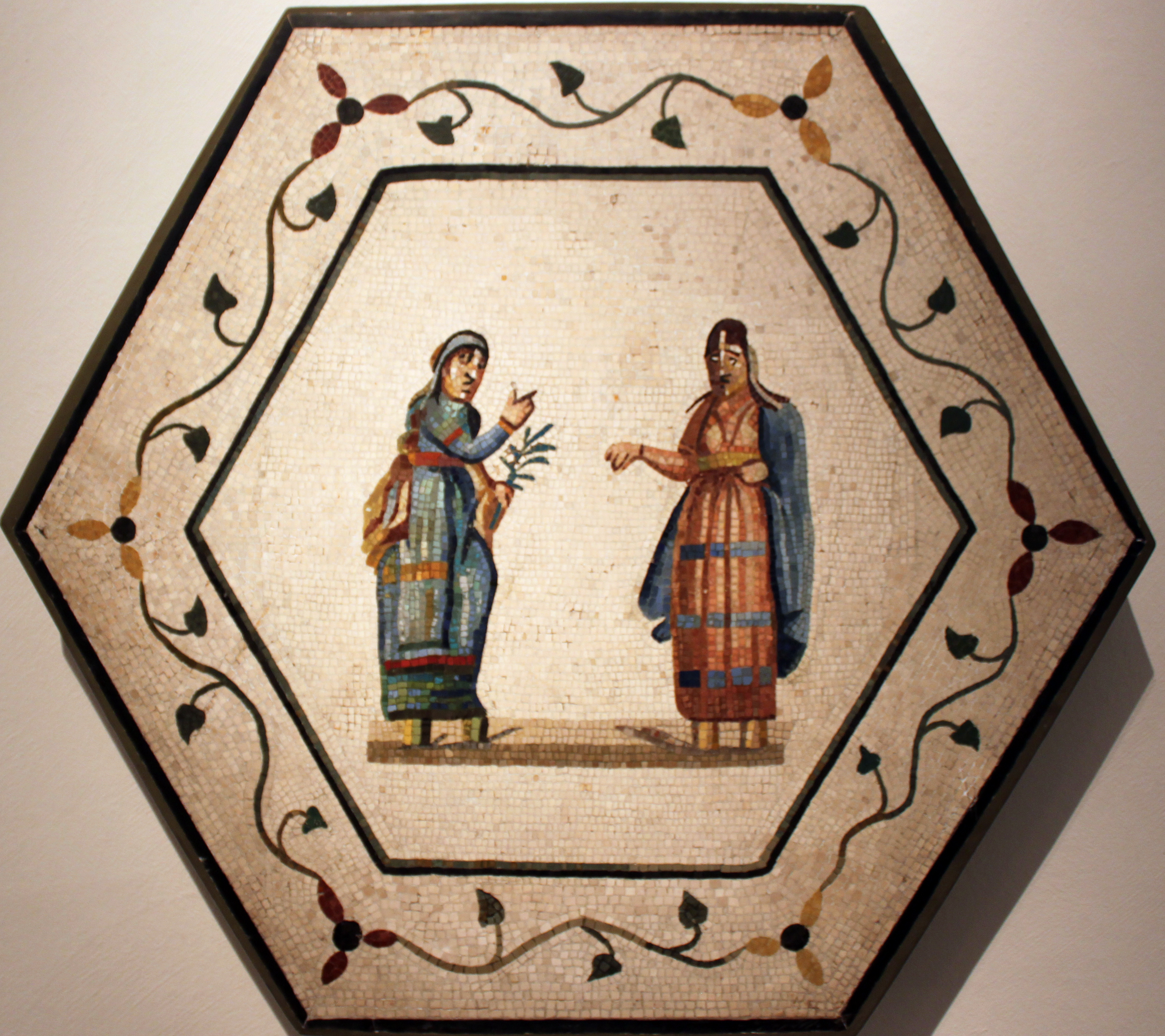
mosaic of actors in tragic scene from Lorium (Altes Museum Berlin)

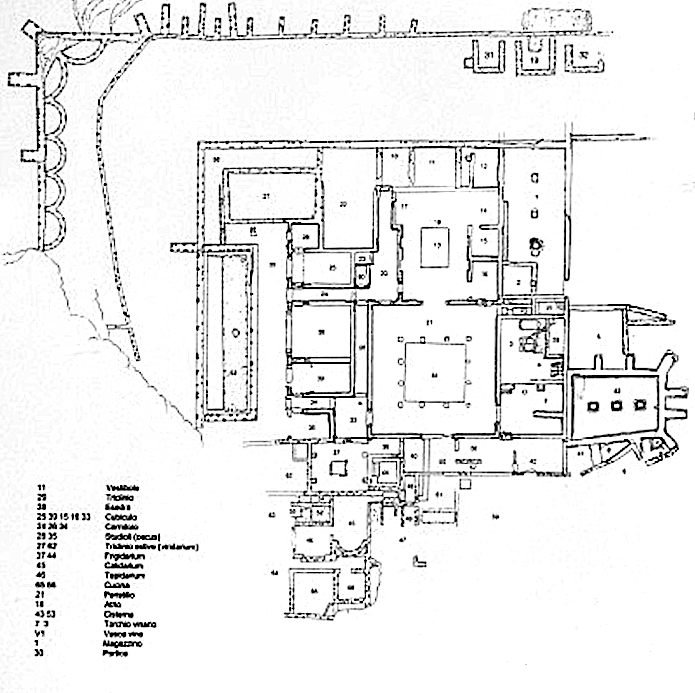
Villa delle Colonnacce

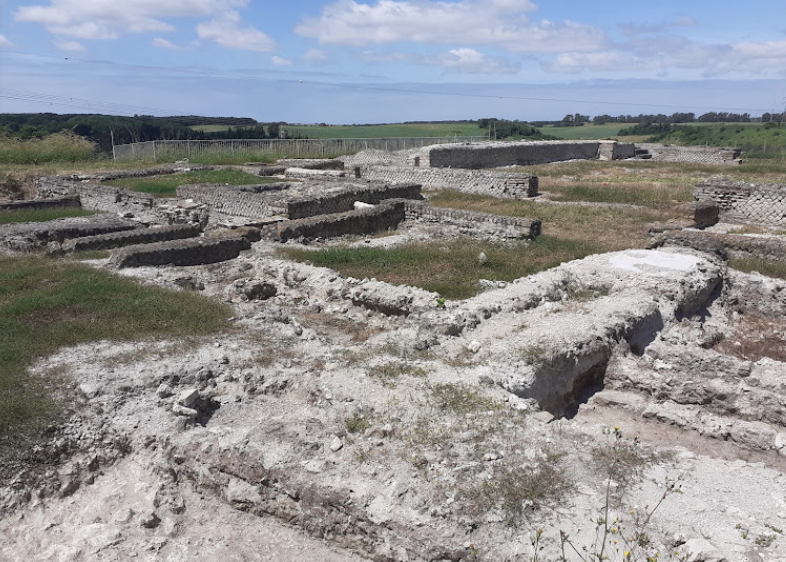
Villa delle Colonnacce

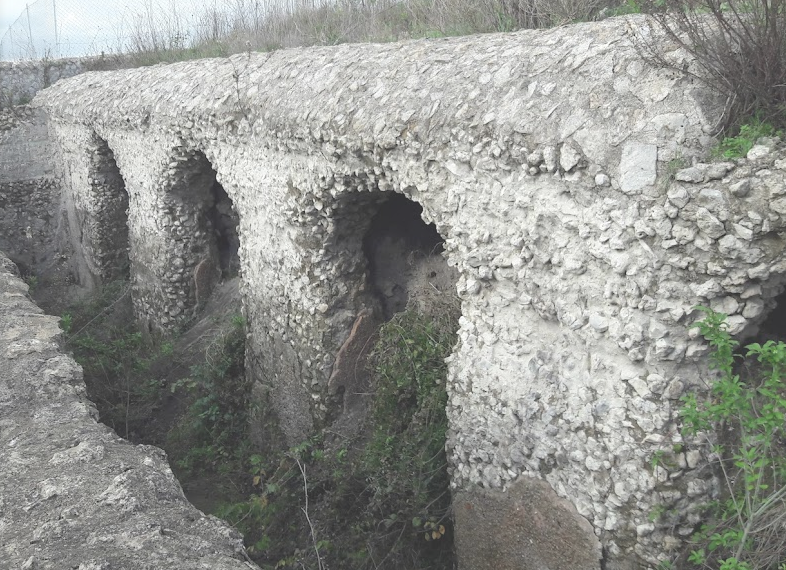
Cistern of Villa delle Colonnacce, 2nd-3rd c. AD

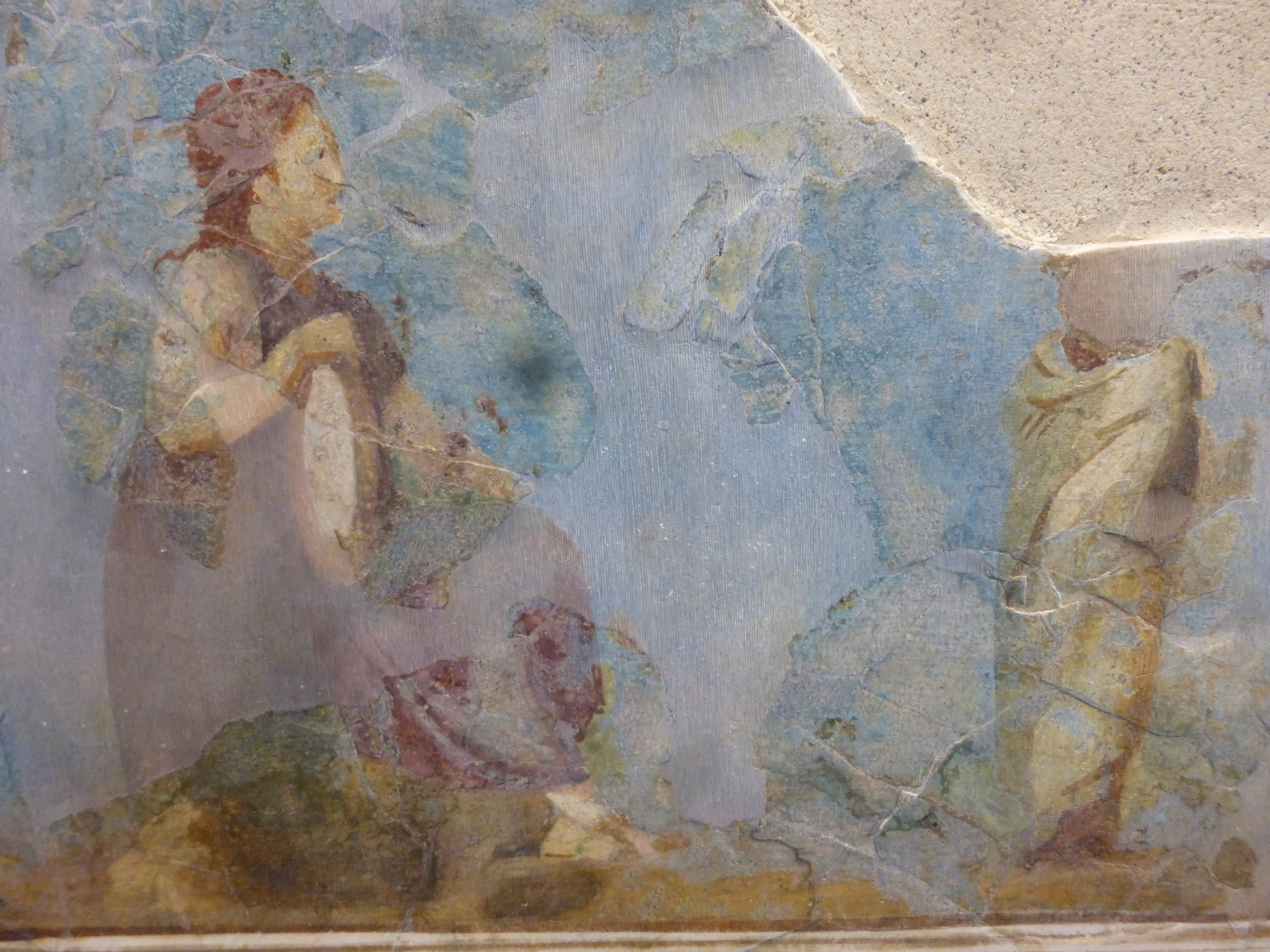
Fresco, villa delle Colonnacce (Rome, Palazzo Massimo alle Terme)

Lorium was a village of ancient Etruria, Italy, on the Via Aurelia, 19 km west of Rome, near today's Castel di Guido.

The place was mentioned in the Tabula Peutingeriana as the first statio or post station at the 12th mile from Rome. Seven kilometres farther west was the post-station of Baebiana, where inscriptions show that some sailors of the fleet were stationed, probably a detachment from Centumcellae along this road. 300 Roman tombs have been found in the area along the old via Aurelia.

An imperial villa in the locality was built by Antoninus Pius, probably on a family estate, who was educated here and died here. It was also a favourite haunt of Pius' adopted son and successor as emperor, Marcus Aurelius who complained about the uneven paving stones of the Via Aurelia which caused "his horse to stumble and slip". Statues of imperial figures found during excavations of 1824, including a Veiled Juno, a Livia in the form of Pietà and a Domitia in the dress of Diana, preserved in the Vatican Clementine Museum, confirm that the imperial palace was located between Castel di Guido and the Bottaccia estate.

On the nearby hills are numerous traces of residential Roman villas including the Villa di Monte Aurelio, a monumental complex located at the intersection of the Via Aurelia with the Arrone river.

Excavations at the Villa dell'Olivella at "Colle Cioccari - Quarto della Viperain", discovered after clandestine excavations by grave robbers in 2005, brought to light baths with mosaic floors belonging to a large residential villa of the 2nd-3rd century. The villa is built on three monumental terraces supported by imposing walls in opus reticulatum in white limestone. A nymphaeum had niches and fountains. Of particular interest is the presence of abundant quantities of marble and glass paste which suggests fine coverings in opus sectile. The baths are at the bottom of the valley and the residential part is located to the west, still in the valley, as the ceramic and construction materials identified. Various brick stamps include one of Stertinia Bassula, daughter of Stertinius Noricus, consul suffectus in 113 AD and owner of praedia (estates), while in others Marcus Pontius Sabinus, who is linked to Antoninus Pius, and was dominus filinarum, consul suffectus in 153 and then governor of Upper Moesia in 159-160; also a stamp of Faustina, wife of Antoninus Pius. The materials and, above all, the marble and glass decoration and mosaic floors, testify to a complex of considerable size and richness and with a close comparison with those of Lucius Verus's villa at Acquatraversa which connects the complex with the imperial palace of Lorium. Mosaics and frescoes are now on display in the Palazzo Massimo National Museum.

Two other residential nuclei had already been identified nearby on Monte delle Colonnacce ("villa delle Colonnacce", plundered by grave robbers in the 70s) and on Monte Aurelio. A villa is also located behind the Church of the Santo Spirito.

The Villa delle Colonnacce dates from the 2nd century BC to the 4th century AD and was probably owned by the Coelii family who were linked to the imperial court. It was built on three levels in a monumental terraced layout and enriched by a series of niches with fountains. The agricultural part dates to the Republican period and the large covered courtyard still contains the bases of three pillars for the roof and a circular well in the centre. A rainwater cistern has the bases of pillars that supported the vaulted ceiling. Two rooms housed a press for olive oil and grapes connected to collection tanks. A lower room had a kitchen with large storage pots (dolii). The residential part was separated from the agricultural part in the imperial period. It has an atrium with marble basin (compluvium) in the centre for rainwater collection, and with a lararium. Dining rooms were spacious with rich mosaic floors and beautiful frescoed walls. Hidden corridors allowed servants to pass behind the dining rooms without disturbing the diners. The peristyled garden had twelve columns in the portico and sloped down towards the central area.

Remains of ancient buildings exist along the road on each side near Castel di Guido and remains of tombs, inscriptions, etc. were excavated in 1823-4.

Another elaborate villa with mosaic floors has recently been found on the Castel di Guido estate after illegal activity there.

There is also evidence from Lorium for the presence of God-fearers, that is, non-Jewish sympathizers to Judaism. A Greek metrical epitaph discovered in the city commemorates a man named Rufinus as a God-fearer who was "learned in the holy Laws and wisdom."
