= Gaius Quinctius Certus Poblicius Marcellus =

Roman senator, general and governor

Gaius Quinctius Certus Poblicius Marcellus was a Roman senator active in the first quarter of the second century AD. He was suffect consul for the nundinium of May to June AD 120, with Titus Rutilius Propinquus as his colleague. The more common and shorter version of his name is Gaius Poblicius Marcellus; he is known primarily from inscriptions. He later served in Syria as the imperial legate (the province's governor).

== Name ==
Marcellus' polyonymous name has attracted much study. Olli Salomies, in his monograph on early imperial naming practices, notes that he "was most probably related to Publicius Certus, prefect of the aerarium Saturni in 97 ... and to Quintus Certus, a Roman knight killed in 69", and notes that Géza Alföldy suggests that Publicius Certus was Marcellus' biological father and Marcellus was adopted by a descendant of Quintus Certus. That Certus is an uncommon gentilicium further suggests the two were related. Salomies, however, concedes Marcellus could have acquired one cognomen through his mother, instead of through adoption. "But I must confess," Salomies concludes, "that I much prefer the explanation that Publicius Marcellus had been adopted by a relative."

== Biography ==
His cursus honorum can be reconstructed from his consulship forward from an inscription. The inscription attests that at some point after his consulate, Marcellus acquired the prestigious sacral office of augur. Other offices he held recorded in this inscription were: governor of Germania Superior, which Werner Eck dates between the year 120 and 128; and governor of Syria, which Dabrowa dates from the year 128 to 136. While governor of Syria, Marcellus was awarded triumphal ornaments for his role in crushing the Bar Kokhba revolt. One of the reasons for receiving military decoration was that the commander of the Syrian navy, Sextus Cornelius Dexter, was under the commander of the Syrian governor.

The Historia Augusta states that the emperor Hadrian forced one Marcellus to commit suicide, but Birley rejects an identification with Poblicius.

Political offices
| Preceded by Lucius Catilius Severus II; Antoninus as consules ordinarii | Roman consul 120 (suffect) with Titus Rutilius Propinquus | Succeeded by Gaius Carminius Gallus; Gaius Atilius Serranus as consules suffecti |
