= Agaclytus =

Agaclytus was the name of:

- Agaclytus (freedman) (2nd century), freedman of Roman Emperor Marcus Aurelius
  - Lucius Aurelius Agaclytus (2nd century), son of the freedman and second husband of Vibia Aurelia Sabina
- Agaclytus (Ancient Greek: Ἀγακλυτός), author of a lost work about Olympia, Greece
